= Yanda =

Yanda may refer to:

- Yanda people, an ethnic group of Australia
- Yanda language, an indigenous Australian language
- Yanda County, a subdivision of New South Wales, Australia
  - Yanda Parish (Yanda County)
- Yanda Airlines, a former regional airline of Australia

== People with the name ==
- Deng Yanda, Chinese military officer
- Marshal Yanda, American football player
- Yanda Li, Chinese scientist
- Yanda Nossiter, Australian canoeist
- Yanda Pyissi, 13th-century Burmese official
