= Parish of Wallandra =

Civil parish in New South Wales, Australia

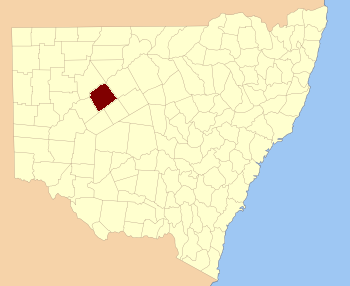
Rankin county NSW.

Wallandra Parish in Cobar Shire is a civil parish of Rankin County, a Cadastral division of New South Wales. The Parish is on the Darling River upstream of Wilcannia, New South Wales and is located at 30.5511°N 144.3351°E. The only town of the parish is Tilpa, New South Wales.

== Geography ==
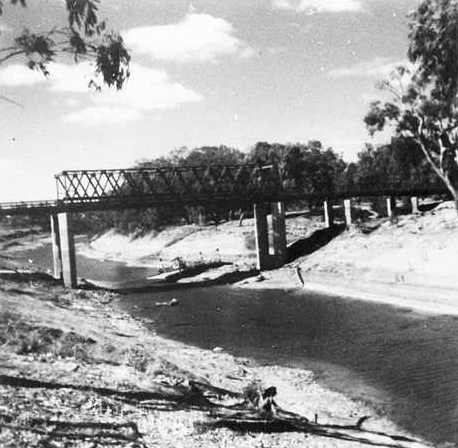
New bridge over the Darling River at Tilpa, low river, with the old hand-operated ferry on the river bank, on right.

The topography of Wallandra Parish is flat with a Köppen climate classification of BsK (Hot semi arid).

Tilpa is a 120 km downstream from Louth, New South Wales and 250km upstream of Wilcannia. The parish has a number of billabongs.

== Economy ==
The economy in the parish is mainly an agricultural area, with sheep grazing the primary activity, and some pockets of irrigated land along the river. Tourism, including farmstay programs on local stations, is the other major local industry. Fishing and camping are popular along the river. The prolonged drought in 2007 saw Tilpa run out of potable water. A Sydney-based company has offered to trial a portable water filtration plant to improve the quality of both the river and bore water.

== History ==
The traditional owners of the area are the Barkindji people.

In 1835, explorer Major Thomas Mitchell was the first European to the region, in which he traced the Darling River to what is now Menindee.

In its heyday, the town of Tilpa was an important river port with paddle steamers delivering supplies to nearby sheep stations and returning down river laden with bales of wool. At Tilpa a punt, allowing sheep, horses and people to cross the Darling River safely, for a fee. was replaced by a bridge in 1963.

== See also ==
- Rankin County, Mississippi
