= Mossgiel County =

Mossgiel New South Wales
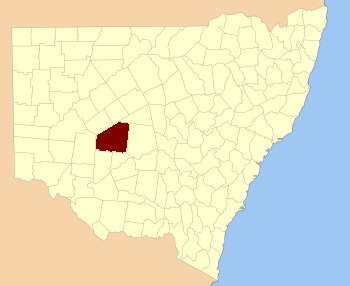
- Location in New South Wales
Lands administrative divisions around Mossgiel:
| Woore | Booroondarra | Mouramba |
| Manara | Mossgiel | Blaxland |
| Manara | Waljeers | Franklin |

Mossgiel County is one of the 141 cadastral divisions of New South Wales, Australia. Waverley Creek is the boundary to the south. It includes Trida.

Mossgiel County appears to have been named from the nearby Mossgiel Station.

== Parishes within this county ==
A full list of parishes found within this county; their current LGA and mapping coordinates to the approximate centre of each location is as follows:

| Parish | LGA | Coordinates |
|---|---|---|
| Barrigan | Cobar Shire | 32°21′30″S 145°16′03″E |
| Bennett | Cobar Shire | 32°36′19″S 145°10′19″E |
| Berriganbam | Cobar Shire | 32°29′04″S 145°07′54″E |
| Bevan | Carrathool Shire | 32°56′23″S 145°15′36″E |
| Billabah | Cobar Shire | 32°39′09″S 145°07′57″E |
| Binda Binda | Cobar Shire | 32°28′32″S 145°18′20″E |
| Bolaro | Cobar Shire | 32°18′20″S 145°26′46″E |
| Boobooran | Carrathool Shire | 33°02′55″S 145°06′32″E |
| Brougham | Central Darling Shire | 32°35′56″S 144°44′38″E |
| Bundamutta | Central Darling Shire | 32°43′04″S 144°42′37″E |
| Burrenyinah | Cobar Shire | 32°35′52″S 145°02′16″E |
| Burrinyanni | Cobar Shire | 32°25′33″S 144°47′14″E |
| Calytria South | Cobar Shire | 32°37′36″S 145°26′31″E |
| Cameron | Central Darling Shire | 32°47′32″S 144°42′46″E |
| Carowra | Central Darling Shire | 32°33′56″S 144°55′04″E |
| Carter | Cobar Shire | 32°40′51″S 145°23′15″E |
| Cogie | Central Darling Shire | 32°59′50″S 145°04′46″E |
| Conoble | Central Darling Shire | 32°49′21″S 144°42′32″E |
| Cookenmabourne | Central Darling Shire | 32°31′09″S 144°48′22″E |
| Coombie | Carrathool Shire | 32°48′51″S 145°27′07″E |
| Eildon | Carrathool Shire | 32°57′58″S 145°20′35″E |
| Elie | Central Darling Shire | 33°07′53″S 144°38′19″E |
| Goonaburra | Cobar Shire | 32°21′00″S 144°55′03″E |
| Gunnabonna | Central Darling Shire | 33°00′25″S 144°50′53″E |
| Gunnagia | Carrathool Shire | 33°04′26″S 145°19′09″E |
| Haines | Carrathool Shire | 33°09′31″S 145°14′02″E |
| Ivanhoe | Central Darling Shire | 32°53′17″S 144°20′21″E |
| Kajuligah | Central Darling Shire | 32°33′39″S 144°38′00″E |
| Katarah | Carrathool Shire | 32°43′57″S 145°12′18″E |
| Keewong | Cobar Shire | 32°18′50″S 145°06′09″E |
| Keleela | Cobar Shire | 32°32′59″S 145°17′35″E |
| Kilkoobwal | Central Darling Shire | 32°56′02″S 144°22′25″E |
| Langcalcal | Central Darling Shire | 32°57′47″S 144°42′38″E |
| Largoh | Cobar Shire | 32°30′50″S 144°57′07″E |
| Malagadery | Carrathool Shire | 33°01′30″S 145°24′58″E |
| Mallee | Carrathool Shire | 32°41′42″S 145°17′53″E |
| Manfred | Central Darling Shire | 32°42′32″S 144°24′31″E |
| Marea | Central Darling Shire | 32°39′38″S 144°34′33″E |
| Maroopna | Carrathool Shire | 32°45′16″S 145°27′40″E |
| Marributa | Cobar Shire | 32°28′52″S 144°39′56″E |
| Maybah | Central Darling Shire | 32°39′51″S 144°24′57″E |
| Mimmilinji | Central Darling Shire | 32°52′58″S 144°28′15″E |
| Miparo | Central Darling Shire | 32°36′39″S 144°25′27″E |
| Moolah | Cobar Shire | 32°42′18″S 145°01′16″E |
| Moongoola | Carrathool Shire | 32°51′44″S 145°11′06″E |
| Murringobunni | Central Darling Shire | 32°46′39″S 144°49′05″E |
| Murrurah | Carrathool Shire | 33°06′56″S 144°57′31″E |
| Nerrada | Central Darling Shire | 32°38′14″S 144°55′45″E |
| Nintie | Central Darling Shire | 32°48′54″S 145°00′15″E |
| Palmyra | Central Darling Shire | 33°01′22″S 144°31′21″E |
| Papotoitoi | Central Darling Shire | 32°55′43″S 144°59′10″E |
| Pingunnia | Cobar Shire | 32°27′14″S 144°49′16″E |
| Pittenweem | Central Darling Shire | 33°07′47″S 144°32′34″E |
| Plevna | Central Darling Shire | 33°09′07″S 144°42′57″E |
| Scholefield | Carrathool Shire | 33°07′17″S 145°03′08″E |
| St Monans | Central Darling Shire | 33°03′21″S 144°41′39″E |
| Tholloolaboy | Carrathool Shire | 33°03′22″S 144°51′12″E |
| Thoolamagoogi | Central Darling Shire | 32°38′04″S 144°35′39″E |
| Tiarri | Central Darling Shire | 32°44′43″S 145°00′51″E |
| Tibara | Central Darling Shire | 32°51′44″S 144°53′38″E |
| Ticehurst | Central Darling Shire | 32°47′25″S 144°24′33″E |
| Tinkoh | Central Darling Shire | 32°46′33″S 145°06′47″E |
| Toorak | Central Darling Shire | 33°05′13″S 144°19′07″E |
| Trewalla | Central Darling Shire | 33°05′36″S 144°26′09″E |
| Trida | Central Darling Shire | 32°58′45″S 144°58′41″E |
| Umphelby | Carrathool Shire | 32°47′42″S 145°16′56″E |
| Waiko | Central Darling Shire | 32°46′16″S 144°31′47″E |
| Wallangery | Central Darling Shire | 32°31′37″S 144°31′41″E |
| Wanga | Carrathool Shire | 32°52′54″S 145°21′21″E |
| Wangaroa | Carrathool Shire | 32°58′06″S 145°10′08″E |
| Warranary | Carrathool Shire | 33°10′22″S 145°08′04″E |
| Warrenitchie | Central Darling Shire | 33°01′40″S 144°21′32″E |
| Wee Elwah | Carrathool Shire | 33°05′30″S 145°12′32″E |
| Weejugalah | Central Darling Shire | 33°02′17″S 144°59′17″E |
| Weenigoota | Cobar Shire | 32°24′52″S 145°08′35″E |
| Weeribinyah | Central Darling Shire | 32°54′08″S 144°36′30″E |
| Wharparoo | Central Darling Shire | 32°50′00″S 144°36′31″E |
| Whittingham | Carrathool Shire | 33°10′23″S 145°22′38″E |
| Willingerie | Central Darling Shire | 32°42′33″S 144°49′46″E |
| Winderima | Cobar Shire | 32°35′23″S 145°18′16″E |
| Woore | Cobar Shire | 32°18′22″S 144°57′53″E |
| Wooroola | Carrathool Shire | 33°07′39″S 144°50′30″E |
| Yallock | Cobar Shire | 32°26′55″S 144°57′45″E |
| Yaradah | Central Darling Shire | 32°56′09″S 144°43′36″E |
| Yathong | Cobar Shire | unknown |
| Youyang | Cobar Shire | unknown |
| Yugaruree | Cobar Shire | 32°17′15″S 145°16′40″E |
