= Paddington, Booroondarra =

Paddington Parish, is a rural locality of Cobar Shire and a civil Parish of Booroondarra County.

The parish is located at 32°09′00″S 145°06′36″E midway between Ivanhoe, New South Wales and Cubba, New South Wales and main landmarks include Paddington Nature Reserve and Keewah Lake.

== See also ==
- Paddington, New South Wales
