= Booroondarra County =

Booroondarra
- Cadastral division
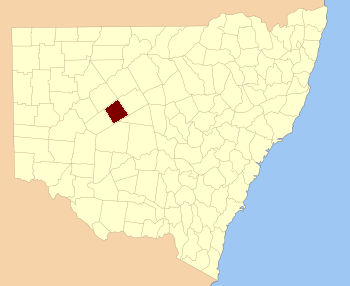
- Location in New South Wales
- Country: Australia
- State: New South Wales
Lands administrative divisions around Booroondarra
Rankin	Yanda	Robinson
Rankin	Booroondarra	Mouramba
Woore	Mossgiel	Mossgiel

Booroondarra County is one of the 141 cadastral divisions of New South Wales.

Booroondarra is believed to be derived from a local Aboriginal word.

== Parishes within this county ==
A full list of parishes found within this county; their current LGA and mapping coordinates to the approximate centre of each location is as follows:

Parish	LGA	Coordinates
Albinia	Cobar Shire	31°59′00″S 145°06′41″E
Barneto	Cobar Shire	31°38′09″S 144°52′49″E
Benkanyah	Cobar Shire	31°51′40″S 145°22′04″E
Bingunyah	Cobar Shire	31°43′00″S 144°39′32″E
Bluff	Cobar Shire	31°34′58″S 145°14′09″E
Bulgoo	Cobar Shire	31°53′5″S 145°29′50″E
Congrou	Cobar Shire	31°45′44″S 145°23′46″E
Cookamilerie	Cobar Shire	31°48′54″S 144°47′49″E
Coolibah	Cobar Shire	31°25′20″S 145°11′52″E
Cowl	Cobar Shire	31°48′33″S 145°12′36″E
Cuckaroo	Cobar Shire	31°37′37″S 145°10′04″E
Cultogerie	Cobar Shire	31°56′00″S 145°04′06″E
Euchara	Cobar Shire	31°33′24″S 144°58′04″E
Finley	Cobar Shire	31°59′57″S 144°56′33″E
Goreetabah	Cobar Shire	31°57′20″S 145°17′36″E
Jumbah	Cobar Shire	31°41′55″S 145°04′16″E
Kallerakay	Cobar Shire	31°58′01″S 145°26′27″E
Kelena	Cobar Shire	31°53′10″S 145°16′10″E
Lammunnia	Cobar Shire	31°47′21″S 145°07′07″E
Makunagoona	Cobar Shire	32°08′13″S 145°12′16″E
Meadows	Cobar Shire	31°44′32″S 145°16′15″E
Moolamanda	Cobar Shire	32°06′51″S 145°02′33″E
Mulchara	Cobar Shire	31°47′01″S 144°56′02″E
Mulga Downs	Cobar Shire	31°29′20″S 145°05′45″E
Paddington	Cobar Shire	32°09′00″S 145°06′36″E
Patutyah	Cobar Shire	32°02′25″S 145°09′50″E
Pulputah	Cobar Shire	32°02′24″S 145°19′58″E
Rankin	Cobar Shire	31°36′54″S 144°58′04″E
Rankin	Cobar Shire	31°37′01″S 145°00′15″E
Springfield	Cobar Shire	31°38′32″S 145°23′43″E
Tiltargara	Cobar Shire	31°51′54″S 144°53′04″E
Turner	Cobar Shire	31°45′25″S 145°29′10″E
Wampunnia	Cobar Shire	31°52′39″S 145°01′06″E
Winnini	Cobar Shire	32°03′41″S 144°59′38″E
Winta	Cobar Shire	31°37′30″S 144°51′10″E
Wynduc	Cobar Shire	31°41′04″S 145°19′35″E
