= Woore County =

Woore New South Wales
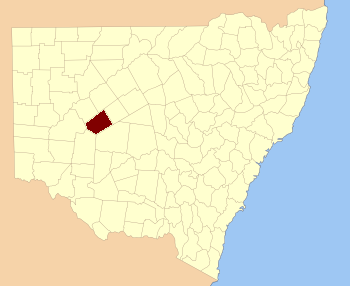
- Location in New South Wales
Lands administrative divisions around Woore:
Werunda	Rankin	Booroondarra
Werunda	Woore	Mossgiel
Livingstone	Manara	Mossgiel

Woore County is one of the 141 cadastral divisions of New South Wales.

Woore County was named in honour of Commissioner of Crown Lands John C Woore.

== Parishes within this county ==
A full list of parishes found within this county; their current LGA and mapping coordinates to the approximate centre of each location is as follows:

Parish	LGA	Coordinates
Baden Park	Central Darling Shire	32°10′34″S 144°12′43″E
Bambilla	Central Darling Shire	32°17′05″S 144°17′14″E
Banny	Cobar Shire	32°02′28″S 144°18′22″E
Barcham	Cobar Shire	32°19′50″S 144°45′59″E
Berangabah	Cobar Shire	32°16′42″S 144°32′10″E
Boingadah	Central Darling Shire	32°22′00″S 144°23′59″E
Broughham	Cobar Shire	
Bulla	Cobar Shire	31°50′38″S 144°34′33″E
Bullberry	Central Darling Shire	32°34′06″S 144°19′40″E
Carrington	Cobar Shire	32°06′51″S 144°46′52″E
Cathkin	Central Darling Shire	32°10′35″S 144°02′03″E
Cooruba	Central Darling Shire	32°27′43″S 144°28′45″E
Emerald	Cobar Shire	31°55′54″S 144°45′34″E
Emerald	Cobar Shire	31°58′01″S 144°45′35″E
Eurugabah	Cobar Shire	32°12′57″S 144°40′26″E
Hann	Central Darling Shire	32°05′32″S 144°08′09″E
Hay	Central Darling Shire	32°21′17″S 143°57′08″E
Kerpa	Central Darling Shire	32°16′22″S 143°55′25″E
Kew	Cobar Shire	32°05′47″S 144°21′25″E
Koorinya	Cobar Shire	32°06′39″S 144°32′29″E
Kulki	Cobar Shire	32°12′31″S 144°56′32″E
Lanty	Cobar Shire	32°10′01″S 144°27′30″E
Manara	Central Darling Shire	
Marfield	Central Darling Shire	32°30′48″S 144°12′27″E
Moama	Cobar Shire	
Nekarboo	Cobar Shire	
Sandy	Cobar Shire	32°13′32″S 144°22′10″E
Temounga	Cobar Shire	32°00′34″S 144°41′39″E
Tiltagara	Cobar Shire	31°54′01″S 144°37′27″E
Tooranie	Central Darling Shire	32°15′37″S 144°05′03″E
Warra Wigra	Cobar Shire	32°22′27″S 144°36′31″E
Widgee	Central Darling Shire	32°21′17″S 144°10′12″E
