= Parish of Donalroe =

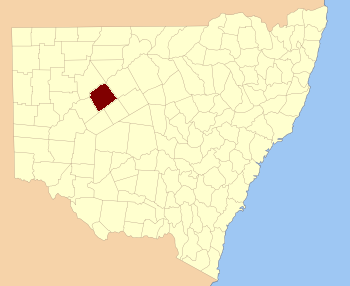
Rankin county NSW.

Donalroe Parish in Cobar Shire is a civil parish of Rankin County,; a Cadastral division of New South Wales.

The Parish is on the Darling River upstream of Wilcannia, New South Wales,; a Cadastral division of New South Wales. and is located at 31°11′32″S 144°10′24″E.

== Geography ==
The topography is flat with a Köppen climate classification of BsK (Hot semi arid).

The economy in the parish is based on broad acre agriculture, based on Wheat, sheep and cattle.

The traditional owners of the area are the Barundji and Barkindji people, with the Danggalia people on the opposite bank of the Darling River.

== See also ==
- Rankin County, Mississippi
