= Bright, Yanda =

Civil parish of New South Wales, Australia

Bright Parish, (Yanda County) in Cobar Shire is a civil parish of Yanda County, a Cadastral division of New South Wales.

== Geography ==
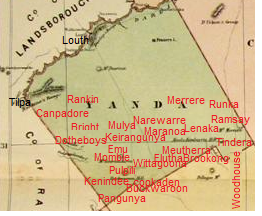
Map of Yanda County (NSW) Australia

The Parish is located at 31.0035°S 145.0249°E.

The topography is flat with a Köppen climate classification of BsK (Hot semi arid). The economy in the parish is based on broad agriculture based on Wheat, sheep and cattle.

The traditional owners of the area are the Barkindji people.
