= Moothumbool, New South Wales =

Australian parish

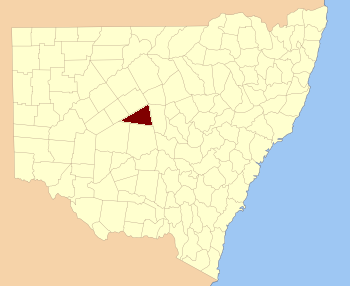
Mouramba County

Moothumbool in central New South Wales is a rural locality of Cobar Shire and a cadasteral parish of in Mouramba County, Australia. The parish is centered on the Balowra Conservation Area and nearby Nangerybang Conservation Area.

The Moothumbool and Middle Creek flow through the parish as does the Sandy Creek (Central West, New South Wales), a tributary of the Bogan River.

The nearest town is Nymagee, New South Wales to the north, and Ermeryang to the south.
