= Parish of Budda =

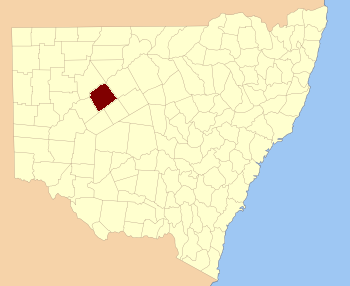
Rankin county NSW.

Budda Parish in Cobar Shire is a civil parish of Rankin County,; a Cadastral division of New South Wales.

The Parish is on the Darling River upstream of Wilcannia, New South Wales and is located at 31°07′15″S 144°16′48″E.

== Geography ==
The topography is flat with a Köppen climate classification of BsK (Hot semi arid).

The economy in the parish is based on broad acre agriculture, based on Wheat and sheep.

== History ==
The traditional owners of the area are the Barundji and Barkindji people.

In 1835, explorer Major Thomas Mitchell was the first European to the region, in which he traced the Darling River to what is now Menindee. In June 1866, the township of Wilcannia was proclaimed.

== See also ==
- Rankin County, Mississippi
