= Robinson County =

Administrative area in New South Wales, Australia

Robinson New South Wales
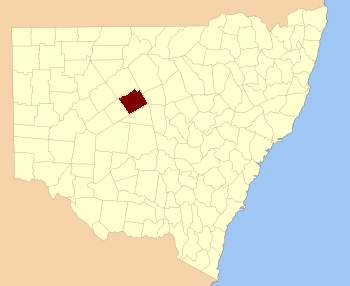
- Location in New South Wales
Lands administrative divisions around Robinson:
Yanda	Yanda	Cowper
Rankin	Robinson	Canbelego
Booroondarra	Mouramba	Flinders

Robinson County is one of the 141 cadastral divisions of New South Wales. It is centred on Cobar.

Robinson County was named in honour of Sir Hercules George Robert Robinson, First Baron Rosmead (1824–1897).

== Parishes within this county ==
A full list of parishes found within this county; their current LGA and mapping coordinates to the approximate centre of each location is as follows:

Parish	LGA	Coordinates
Amphitheatre	Cobar Shire	31°30′41″S 145°30′49″E
Balah	Cobar Shire	31°33′33″S 145°34′38″E
Baroora	Cobar Shire	31°47′27″S 145°45′17″E
Bee	Cobar Shire	31°42′16″S 146°00′07″E
Billagoe	Cobar Shire	31°15′26″S 145°51′48″E
Booroomugga	Cobar Shire	31°16′13″S 146°01′15″E
Booroondarra	Cobar Shire	31°12′13″S 145°37′44″E
Buckambool	Cobar Shire	unknown
Buckwaroon	Cobar Shire	unknown
Chesney	Cobar Shire	31°07′11″S 145°46′49″E
Cobar	Cobar Shire	31°30′21″S 145°49′59″E
Cohn	Cobar Shire	31°32′54″S 146°13′31″E
Coonumberto	Cobar Shire	31°19′00″S 145°44′22″E
Coonumberto	Cobar Shire	31°19′24″S 145°38′49″E
Coronga	Cobar Shire	31°09′54″S 145°57′04″E
Coronga	Cobar Shire	31°11′48″S 145°59′39″E
Cuttagullyaroo	Cobar Shire	31°16′09″S 145°40′15″E
Cuttagullyaroo	Cobar Shire	31°17′19″S 145°36′04″E
Davies	Cobar Shire	31°20′26″S 145°55′45″E
Gidda	Cobar Shire	31°09′21″S 145°43′50″E
Gidgie	Cobar Shire	31°29′41″S 145°22′13″E
Grawlin	Cobar Shire	31°27′23″S 145°37′26″E
Hillston	Cobar Shire	31°35′56″S 145°50′09″E
Hoskins	Cobar Shire	31°24′07″S 146°05′55″E
Kaloogleguy	Cobar Shire	31°24′06″S 145°48′04″E
Kaloogleguy	Cobar Shire	31°27′24″S 145°46′04″E
Kiantharillany	Cobar Shire	31°20′54″S 145°36′04″E
Lambrigg	Cobar Shire	31°30′12″S 146°10′24″E
Lerida	Cobar Shire	31°42′38″S 145°41′00″E
Linton	Cobar Shire	31°29′40″S 145°56′48″E
Louth	Cobar Shire	31°18′47″S 145°32′54″E
Louth	Cobar Shire	31°21′24″S 145°30′34″E
Mopone	Cobar Shire	31°24′24″S 145°52′04″E
Moquilamba	Cobar Shire	unknown
Moquilamba	Cobar Shire	31°13′39″S 145°46′29″E
Mulga	Cobar Shire	unknown
Mullimut	Cobar Shire	31°22′03″S 145°48′09″E
Mumbowanna	Cobar Shire	31°19′03″S 145°20′31″E
Narri	Cobar Shire	31°38′12″S 145°58′10″E
Nyngan	Cobar Shire	31°24′57″S 145°59′00″E
Priory	Cobar Shire	unknown
Rochford	Cobar Shire	31°38′27″S 146°07′20″E
Tambua	Cobar Shire	31°22′39″S 145°15′54″E
Tindayrey	Cobar Shire	31°07′57″S 145°57′12″E
Tindayrey	Cobar Shire	31°08′24″S 145°53′29″E
Toy	Cobar Shire	31°28′54″S 145°44′04″E
Walshe	Cobar Shire	31°25′45″S 145°25′46″E
Weltie	Cobar Shire	31°33′42″S 145°57′21″E
Winbar	Cobar Shire	31°14′56″S 145°30′45″E
Yanda	Cobar Shire	31°34′51″S 146°04′22″E
