= Gundabooka, Yanda =

Gundabooka Parish
- Coordinates: 30°32′0″S 145°47′0″E
- Country: Australia
- State: New South Wales
- LGA: Bourke Shire

Government
  - State electorate: Barwon
  - Federal division: Parkes
- Elevation: 100 m (330 ft)
- Postcode: 2840

Gundabooka Parish is a civil parish, of Yanda County, a cadastral division of New South Wales.

== Location ==
The parish is on the Darling River upstream of Louth, New South Wales and downstream of Bourke, New South Wales and is located at 30°48′57″S 145°48′36″E.

Images from the park

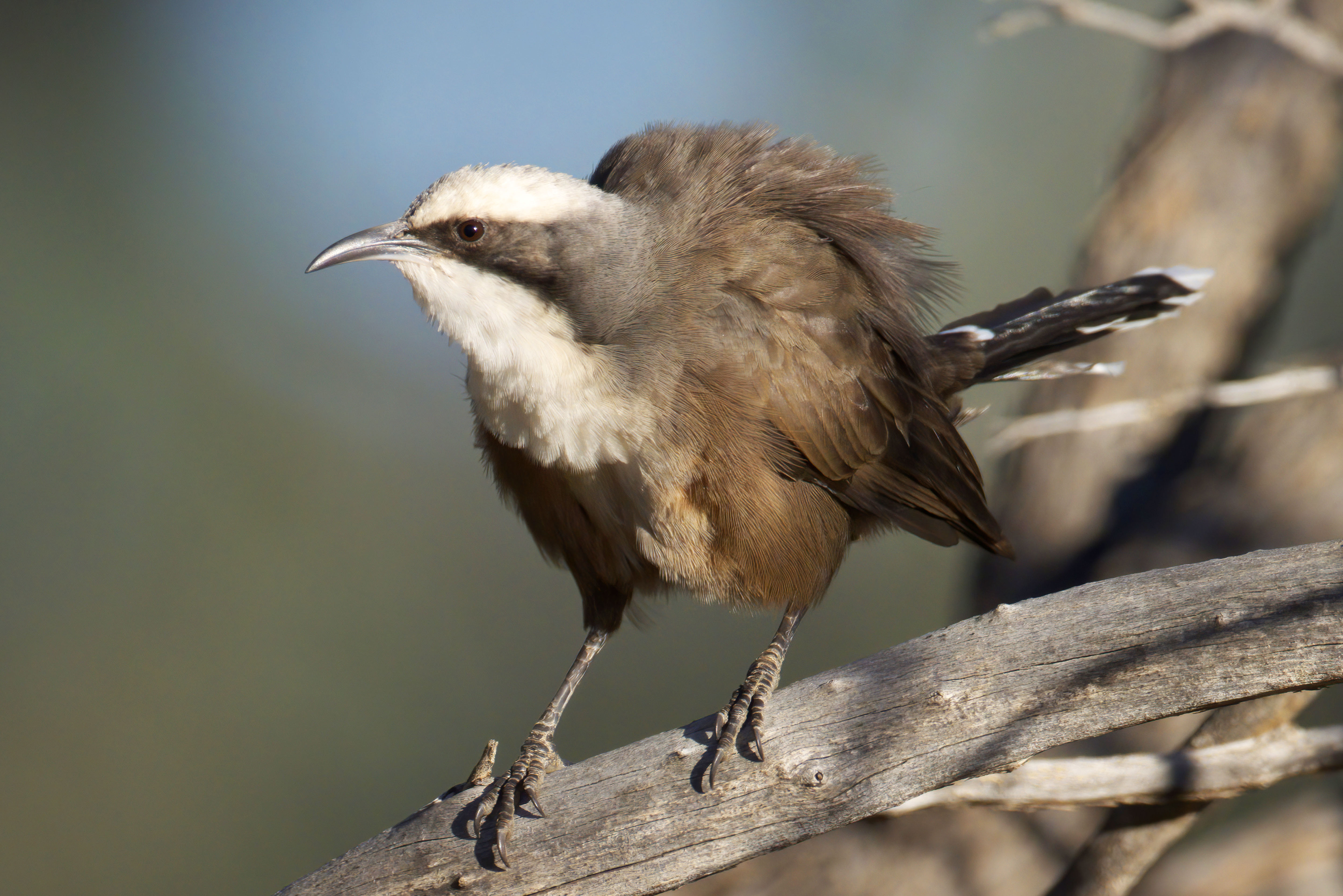
Grey-crowned babbler in the park

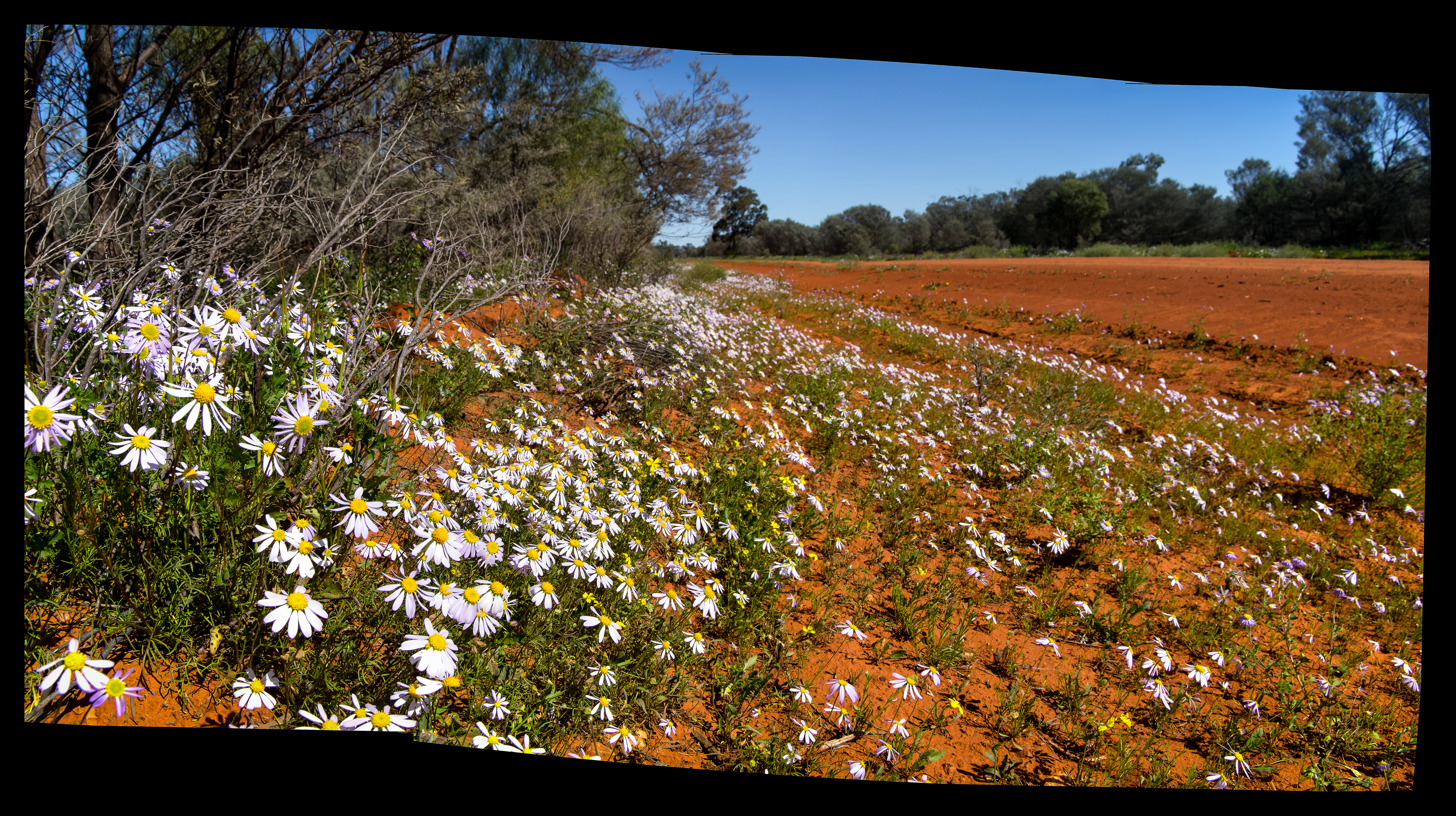

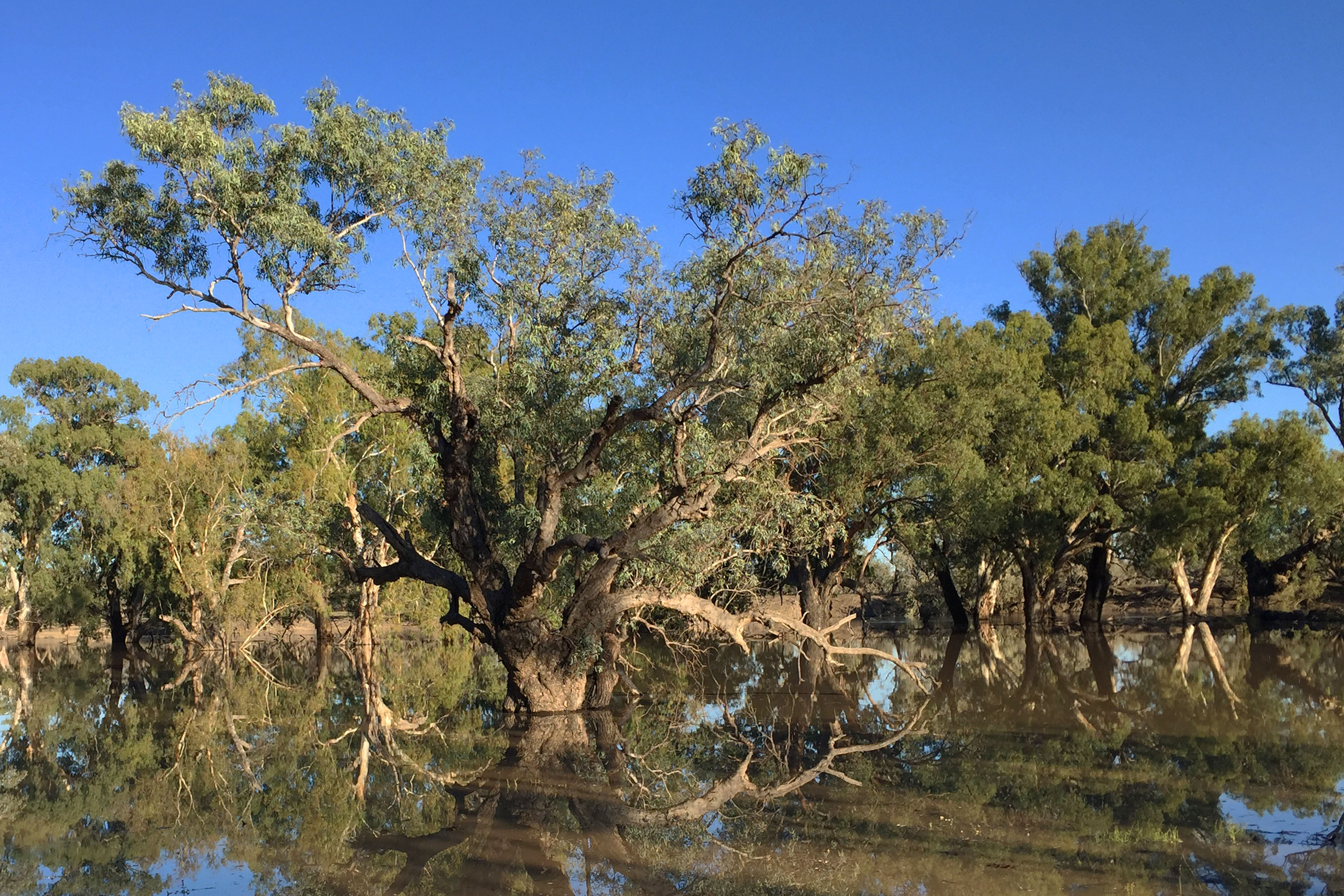
Floodwaters near Yanda campground

== Geography ==
The topography is flat with a Köppen climate classification of BsK (hot semi-arid). The climate is characterised by hot summers and mild winters. The annual average rainfall is 350 mm, although this is highly variable.

Much of the parish is in the Gundabooka National Park and adjoining conservation area.

== Etymology ==
Gundabooka is believed to be derived from a local Aboriginal word and is also the name of Gundabook Station.

== History ==
The traditional owners of the area are the Ngamba and Barkindji peoples.

The first European to the area was Thomas Mitchell.

== See also ==
- Gunderbooka County
