= Parish of Erimeran =

Parish in New South Wales, Australia

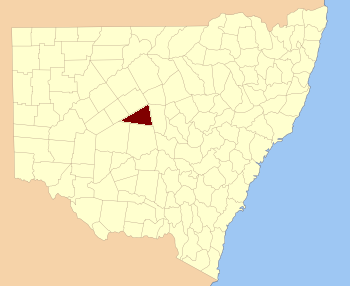
Mouramba County

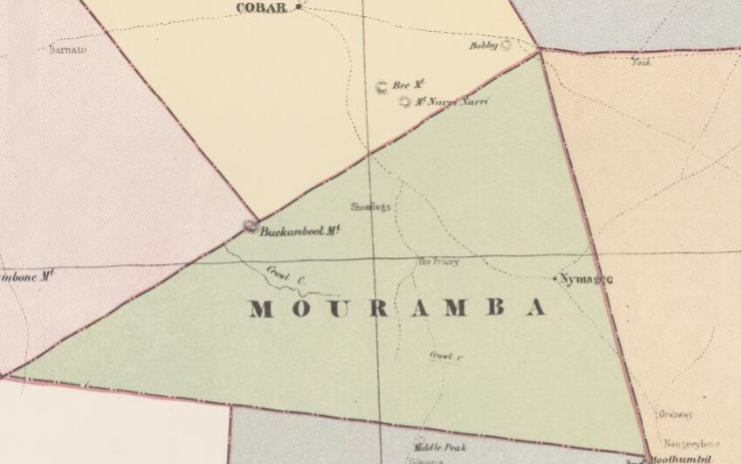
Map of Mouramba County (New South Wales) in 1886.

Erimeran Parish in Mouramba County, central New South Wales is a cadasteral parish of Australia. The topography of the parish is generally flat with a thin scrub forest and the main economy of the area is agriculture.

The parish is on Sandy Creek and includes the Balowra State Conservation Area and the nearest town is Gilgunnia, New South Wales.
