= Parish of Tankarook =

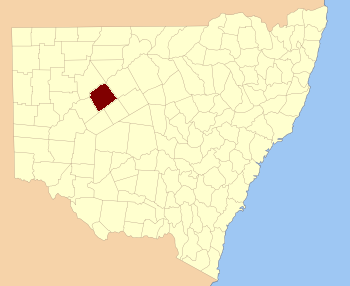
Rankin county NSW.

Tankarrok Parish in Cobar Shire is a civil parish of Rankin County,; a Cadastral division of New South Wales.

The Parish is on the Darling River upstream of Wilcannia, New South Wales and is located at 31°02′14″S 144°25′37″E.

== Geography ==
The topography of Tankarrok Parish is flat with a Köppen climate classification of BsK (Hot semi arid).

The economy in the parish is based on broad acre agriculture, mainly on Wheat and sheep.

== History ==
The traditional owners of the area are the Barkindji people.

In 1835, explorer Major Thomas Mitchell was the first European to the region, in which he traced the Darling River to what is now Menindee. In June 1866, the township of Wilcannia was proclaimed.
