= Goodenia occidentalis =

Western goodenia

Scientific classification
- Kingdom: Plantae
- Clade: Tracheophytes
- Clade: Angiosperms
- Clade: Eudicots
- Clade: Asterids
- Order: Asterales
- Family: Goodeniaceae
- Genus: Goodenia
- Species: G. occidentalis

Binomial name
- Goodenia occidentalis Carolin

Species of plant

Goodenia occidentalis, commonly known as western goodenia, is a species of flowering plant in the family Goodeniaceae and is endemic to drier parts of southern Australia. It is a short-lived prostrate to low-lying herb with scaly, lance-shaped leaves and racemes of yellow flowers with a brownish centre.

== Description ==
Goodenia occidentalis is a prostrate to low-lying herb with stems up to 40 cm (16 in) long. The leaves at the base of the plant are lance-shaped leaves with the narrower end towards the base, sometimes lyrate, 30–60 mm (1.2–2.4 in) long, 4–12 mm (0.16–0.47 in) wide and scaly. The flowers are arranged in more or less one-sided racemes up to 180 mm (7.1 in) long with leaf-like bracts, each flower on a pedicel 6–11 mm (0.24–0.43 in) long. The sepals are egg-shaped, 1–1.6 mm (0.039–0.063 in) long, the petals yellow and 4–6 mm (0.16–0.24 in) long. The lower lobes of the corolla are about 1.5 mm (0.059 in) long with wings about 0.2 mm (0.0079 in) wide. Flowering mainly occurs from June to September and the fruit is a more or less spherical capsule 2.5–3 mm (0.098–0.118 in) in diameter.

== Taxonomy and naming ==
Goodenia occidentalis was first formally described in 1980 by Roger Charles Carolin in the journal Telopea from material he collected on the road between Warburton, Western Australia and Laverton in 1967. The specific epithet (occidentalis) refers to the species' mainly western distribution, although it has been found as far east as New South Wales.

== Distribution and habitat ==
This goodenia grows on sand dunes and stony hills and is widely distributed in the drier areas of Western Australia, the Northern Territory and South Australia. It has also been recorded from near Louth in New South Wales.

== Conservation status ==
Goodenia occidentalis is classified as "not threatened" by the Government of Western Australia Department of Parks and Wildlife but as of "near threatened" under the Northern Territory Government Territory Parks and Wildlife Conservation Act 1976 and as "endangered" under the New South Wales Biodiversity Conservation Act 2016.
