= Yelty, New South Wales =

Rural locality in New South Wales

Yelty is a civil parish of Manara County and a rural locality of Central Darling Shire in the Far West region of New South Wales, Australia. It was gazetted by the Geographical Names Board of New South Wales on 16 April 1991 under Deposited Plan 754502. The nearest town is Ivanhoe, approximately 9.5 km to the east.

== Geography ==
Yelty is located at 32°55′48″S 144°11′55″E. The area appears on the IVANHOE 1:100,000 topographic map sheet (reference 7732). The locality has no permanent settlements.

== Climate ==
The area has a hot, arid climate. The closest Bureau of Meteorology recording station is Ivanhoe Aerodrome AWS (station 049000). Mean annual rainfall is 276 mm; November is the wettest month (30 mm) and October the driest (17.6 mm). Mean annual maximum temperature is 26.2 °C, reaching a mean of 36.1 °C in January. Mean annual minimum temperature is 12.3 °C, falling to a mean of 5.0 °C in July.

== Aboriginal heritage ==
The Barkandji and Malyangapa People hold native title over the area. On 16 June 2015 the Federal Court of Australia, in Barkandji Traditional Owners #8 v Attorney-General of New South Wales (NCD2015/001), issued a consent determination recognising native title over approximately 128,000 km² of far western New South Wales, an area that includes Central Darling Shire. The determination followed an 18-year legal process; Justice Jayne Jagot presided. The prescribed body corporate is the Barkandji Native Title Group Aboriginal Corporation RNTBC.
