= Rankin County =

Rankin County may refer to:

- Rankin County, Mississippi, United States
- Rankin County, New South Wales, Australia
