= Bee, New South Wales =

Rural locality of Cobar Shire, New South Wales, Australia

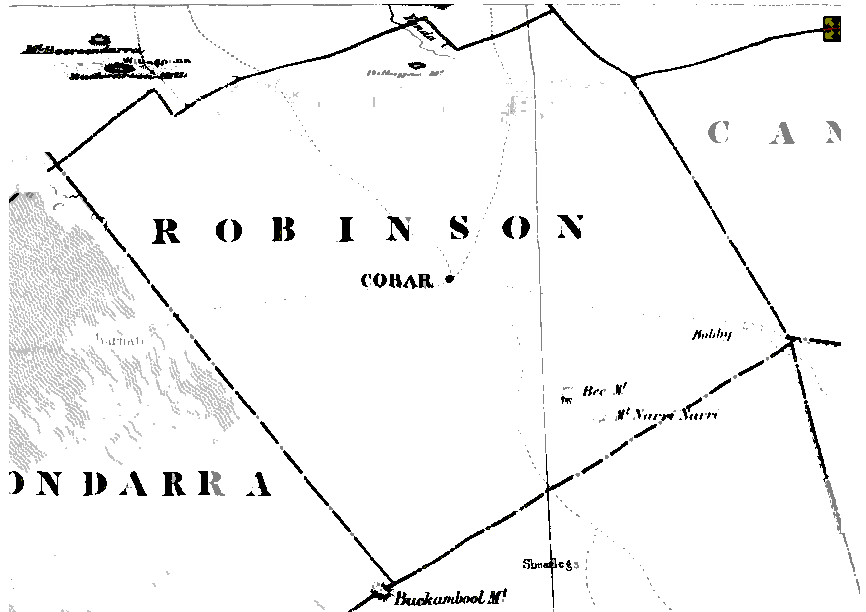
Robinson county in 1886

Bee Parish, New South Wales is a rural locality of Cobar Shire and a civil parish of Robinson County.

== Geography ==
The Parish is located on the Barrier Highway between Cubba and Cobar, New South Wales. The Parish is on Buckwaroon Creek has a flat topography and is vegetated by a sparse shrub cover.
