= Matheson, New South Wales =

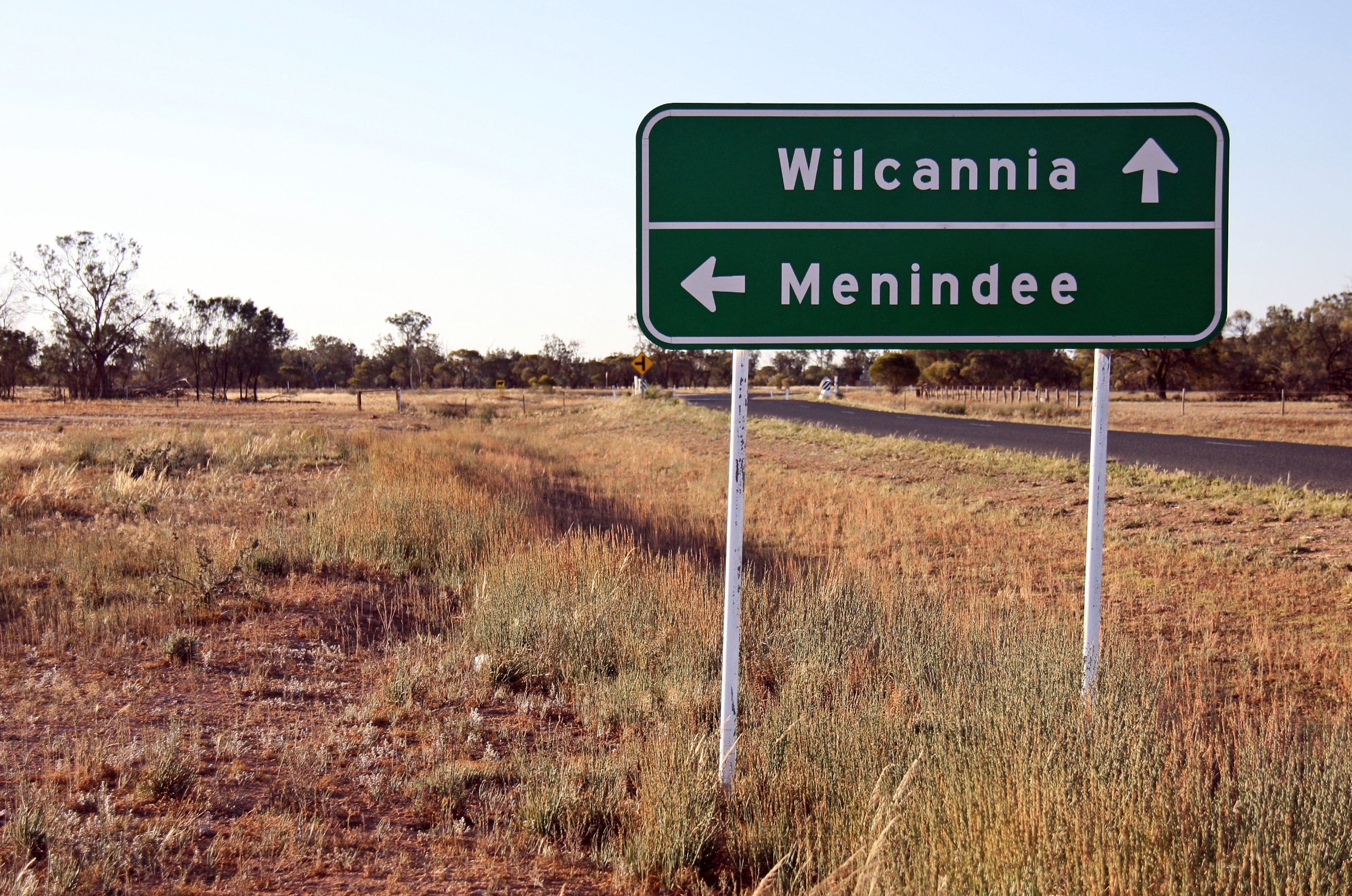
Matheson on the Cobb Highway near the Ivanhoe-Menindee Road intersection

Matheson, New South Wales is civil parish of Manara County and a rural locality of Central Darling Shire in far western New South Wales.

Matheson is located at 32°49′35″S 144°12′59″E and the area is hot and arid and as such there are no settlements with Matheson but the nearest town is Ivanhoe 3 kilometres to the south east.
