= Middlesex Parish, New South Wales =

Parish in New South Wales, Australia

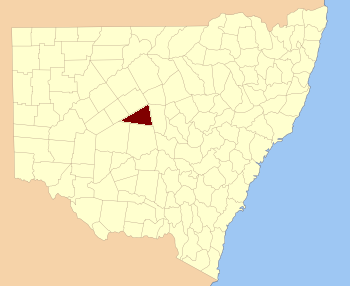
Mouramba County

The Parish of Middlesex in Mouramba County, central New South Wales is a rural locality of Cobar Shire and cadasteral parish of Australia.

The parish is on the Kidman Way at Gilgunnia, New South Wales and the nearest town is Nymagee, New South Wales. The parish is within Cobar Shire.
