= Irymple =

Irymple may refer to several places:

- Irymple, New South Wales
- Irymple, Victoria
