= Werunda County =

Werunda New South Wales
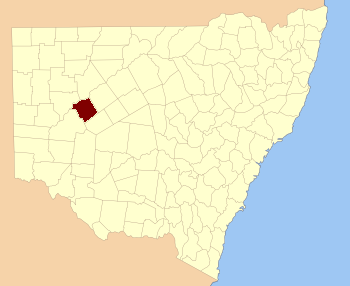
- Location in New South Wales
Lands administrative divisions around Werunda:
Young	Killara	Rankin
Young	Werunda	Rankin
Livingstone	Woore	Woore

Werunda County is one of the 141 cadastral divisions of New South Wales. The Darling River is the north-western boundary. It includes Poopelloe Lake, and the area to the east and south-east of Wilcannia.

The name Werunda is believed to be derived from a local Aboriginal word.

== Parishes within this county ==
A full list of parishes found within this county; their current LGA and mapping coordinates to the approximate centre of each location is as follows:

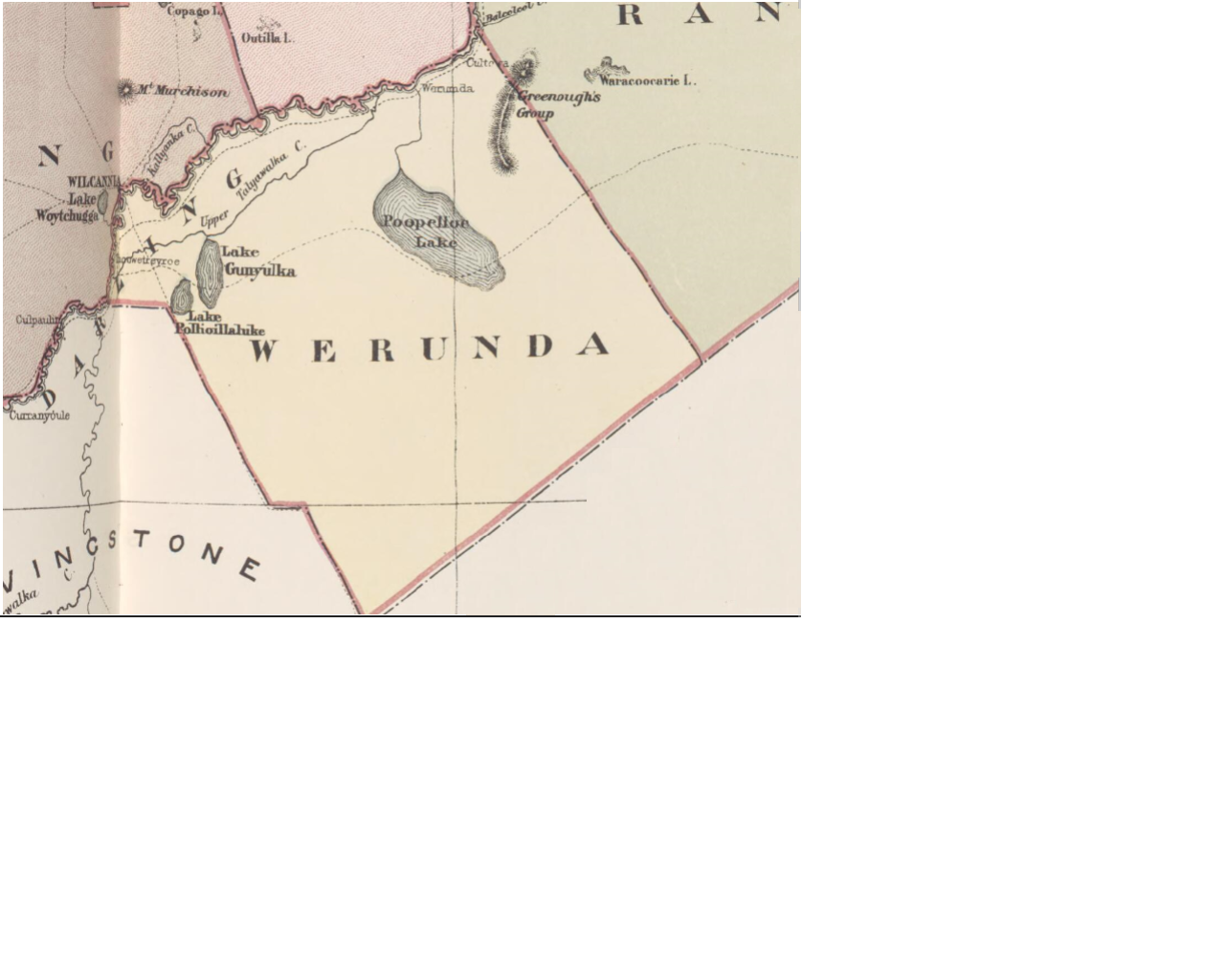
Map of Werunda County, Far west New South Wales from John Sands 1886 Atlas of Australia.

Parish	LGA	Coordinates
Calcoo	Central Darling Shire	31°39′10″S 143°35′22″E
Caltigeenaa	Central Darling Shire	31°34′55″S 143°52′00″E
Chance	Central Darling Shire	31°30′13″S 144°04′53″E
Chirnside	Central Darling Shire	31°57′38″S 143°45′13″E
Coolmara	Central Darling Shire	32°05′22″S 143°49′30″E
Coonavittra	Central Darling Shire	31°43′05″S 144°18′23″E
Coonoolcra	Central Darling Shire	31°47′18″S 143°35′16″E
Cowary	Central Darling Shire	unknown
Cultowa	Central Darling Shire	31°53′50″S 144°05′40″E
Curranyale	Central Darling Shire	unknown
Donald	Cobar Shire	31°50′34″S 144°20′34″E
Dunoon	Central Darling Shire	31°31′41″S 143°37′36″E
Goonalgaa	Central Darling Shire	31°45′50″S 143°41′28″E
Greenough	Central Darling Shire	31°34′29″S 144°13′15″E
Gunyulka	Central Darling Shire	31°41′55″S 143°29′55″E
Keiss	Central Darling Shire	31°30′51″S 143°44′26″E
Manara	Central Darling Shire	32°11′23″S 143°50′39″E
Merry	Central Darling Shire	31°25′16″S 144°01′55″E
Moira	Central Darling Shire	31°52′54″S 143°54′57″E
Murtee	Central Darling Shire	31°36′34″S 143°31′26″E
Paradise	Central Darling Shire	31°59′18″S 143°51′37″E
Poopelloe	Central Darling Shire	31°40′14″S 144°09′22″E
Ringrose	Central Darling Shire	32°02′43″S 144°01′15″E
Talyawalka	Central Darling Shire	31°35′48″S 143°41′28″E
Warwick	Cobar Shire	31°56′19″S 144°01′33″E
Weatherley	Central Darling Shire	31°45′37″S 143°51′16″E
Weeyoola	Central Darling Shire	31°46′05″S 144°09′13″E
Werunda	Central Darling Shire	31°29′34″S 143°50′56″E
Wilcannia South	Central Darling Shire	31°36′12″S 143°23′41″E
Wongolarroo	Central Darling Shire	31°39′11″S 143°57′20″E
Woore	Cobar Shire	unknown
Woytchugga	Central Darling Shire	31°43′17″S 143°23′13″E
Yoree	Central Darling Shire	31°44′13″S 144°01′56″E
