= Mouramba County =

Mouramba
- Cadastral division
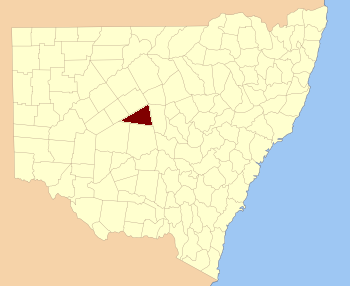
- Location in New South Wales
- Country: Australia
- State: New South Wales
Lands administrative divisions around Mouramba
| Robinson | Canbelego | Flinders |
| Booroondarra | Mouramba | Flinders |
| Mossgiel | Blaxland | Flinders |

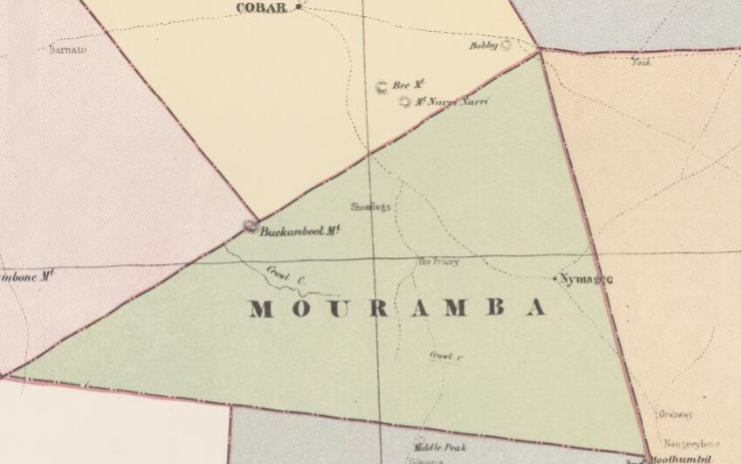
Map of Mouramba County (New South Wales) in 1886.

Mouramba County is one of the 141 cadastral divisions of New South Wales.

Mouramba is believed to be derived from a local Aboriginal word and is the name of nearby Mouramba Station.

== Parishes within this county ==
The parishes in the county, and mapping coordinates to the approximate centre of each, are:

| Parish | LGA | Coordinates |
|---|---|---|
| Adams | 31°43′36″S 146°16′36″E | |
| Albyn | 32°06′53″S 145°55′14″E | |
| Barton | 31°56′52″S 146°04′38″E | |
| Beloura | 32°12′04″S 146°26′11″E | |
| Blaxland | 32°16′02″S 145°48′44″E | |
| Booth | 32°13′48″S 145°45′17″E | |
| Brigstocke | 32°10′53″S 145°59′35″E | |
| Buppe | 31°39′25″S 146°17′15″E | |
| Byron | 32°03′41″S 145°51′27″E | |
| Canbelego | 31°49′43″S 146°19′59″E | |
| Carlisle | 32°16′03″S 146°01′06″E | |
| Chaucer | 32°05′30″S 145°24′24″E | |
| Coree | 31°55′36″S 146°17′32″E | |
| Crowl | 32°17′32″S 145°59′36″E | |
| Devon | 32°01′12″S 146°17′13″E | |
| Donaldson | 31°47′39″S 145°59′00″E | |
| Dowling | 32°02′09″S 145°32′11″E | |
| Dryden | 32°19′00″S 146°15′48″E | |
| Dunstan | 31°55′09″S 146°12′26″E | |
| Ellerslie | 32°14′43″S 145°36′37″E | |
| Ellis | 31°58′51″S 146°03′53″E | |
| Erimeran | 32°16′18″S 146°18′47″E | |
| Evans | 32°00′41″S 145°56′39″E | |
| Fisher | 31°43′13″S 146°07′41″E | |
| Flinders | 31°58′49″S 146°22′34″E | |
| Fulton | 32°10′48″S 145°29′13″E | |
| Gilgunnia | unknown | |
| Goold | 31°55′44″S 145°56′32″E | |
| Gwynne | 31°51′29″S 145°58′53″E | |
| Hartwood | 32°03′04″S 146°22′47″E | |
| Hathaway | 32°13′10″S 146°20′56″E | |
| Hume | 32°07′54″S 146°04′59″E | |
| Jamieson | 32°08′37″S 146°10′26″E | |
| Johnston | 31°50′50″S 146°13′07″E | |
| Kangerong | 31°56′42″S 145°41′21″E | |
| Keira | 31°53′49″S 146°17′50″E | |
| Kiamba | 32°07′50″S 145°32′05″E | |
| Kinchelsea | 32°15′00″S 145°53′27″E | |
| Kinnear | 32°14′04″S 146°09′34″E | |
| Knox | 32°04′15″S 146°04′36″E | |
| Kruge | 32°20′50″S 146°10′04″E | |
| Mcgregor | 32°06′22″S 145°50′07″E | |
| Middlesex | 32°19′27″S 146°04′24″E | |
| Moothumbool | 32°19′14″S 146°20′59″E | |
| Mossgiel | 32°11′22″S 145°17′25″E | |
| Mouramba | 32°19′54″S 146°27′15″E | |
| Nymagee | 31°59′55″S 146°12′16″E | |
| Pangee | 32°16′37″S 145°27′02″E | |
| Priory Plains | 32°05′00″S 146°16′40″E | |
| Restdown | 31°45′58″S 146°14′21″E | |
| Robinson | 32°02′41″S 145°40′00″E | |
| Roset | 32°07′48″S 146°23′01″E | |
| Scott | 31°51′17″S 146°05′29″E | |
| Shenandoah | 32°00′46″S 145°45′34″E | |
| Teran | 32°22′55″S 146°27′24″E | |
| The Rookery | 31°45′33″S 146°07′13″E | |
| Urolie | 32°05′09″S 145°39′17″E | |
| Walker | 32°09′10″S 146°15′28″E | |
| Wallace | 31°57′32″S 145°51′24″E | |
| Werlong | 32°16′41″S 145°43′10″E | |
| Wills | 32°04′06″S 146°11′40″E | |
| Yamma | 32°11′54″S 145°38′16″E | |
| Yanko | 32°09′12″S 145°44′18″E | |
| Youyang | unknown | |

All are in Cobar Shire.
