= Irymple, New South Wales =

Irymple
- Town
- Coordinates: 32°31′15″S 145°26′29″E
- Country: Australia
- State: New South Wales
- Region: Orana
- LGA: Cobar Shire
- Location: 145 km (90 mi) S of Cobar; 670 km (420 mi) W of Sydney

Government
  - State electorate: Barwon
  - Federal division: Parkes

Population
  - Total: 3 (SAL 2021)
- Postcode: 2835
- County: Mossgiel
- Parish: Calytria

Irymple is a locality in Cobar Shire in New South Wales, Australia. At the 2016 census, it had a population of 7. It is located 555 kilometres away from Sydney. The nearest airport is Cobar Airport, 117 kilometres away and the nearest railway station is Euabalong West, 135 kilometres away.

== Location ==
Irymple is connected to the Kidman Way by a very small road that passes through Irymple's Yathong Nature Reserve and Nombinnie Nature Reserve. Nearby places include:

Name	Distance (km)
Lake Cargelligo	115 km
Ivanhoe	131 km
Condobolin	159 km
Tottenham	167 km
Nyngan	181 km
Tullamore	185 km
Trundle	203 km
Warren	228 km
Trangie	230 km
Wilcannia	235 km
