= Nyngan Parish (Robinson County), New South Wales =

Parish in New South Wales, Australia

Coordinates: 31°24′57.0″S 145°59′00.0″E

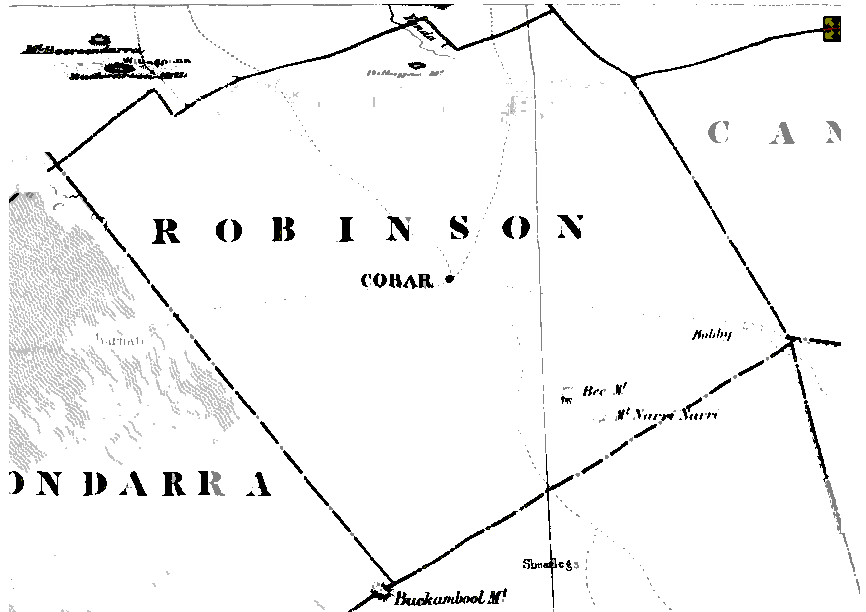
Robinson county in 1886

Nyngan Parish is a civil parish of Robinson County, a cadastral division of New South Wales. It is located on Yanda Creek and the Kidman Way north east of Cobar, New South Wales.

It is west of the town of Nyngan, New South Wales.
