= Manara County =

Manara New South Wales
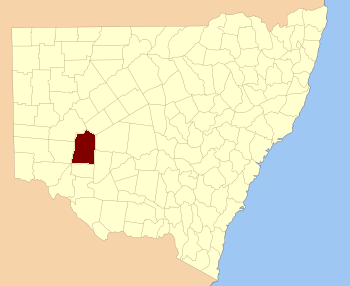
- Location in New South Wales
Lands administrative divisions around Manara:
| Livingstone | Woore | Mossgiel |
| Perry | Manara | Mossgiel |
| Wentworth | Kilfera | Waljeers |

Manara County is one of the 141 cadastral divisions of New South Wales. It includes Ivanhoe.

Manara is believed to be derived from a local Aboriginal word and is also used for the nearby Manara Station.

== Parishes within this county ==
A full list of parishes found within this county; their current LGA and mapping coordinates to the approximate centre of each location is as follows:

| Parish | LGA | Coordinates |
|---|---|---|
| Amoona | Central Darling Shire | 32°50′25″S 143°51′59″E |
| Baymore | Balranald Shire | 33°26′33″S 143°17′43″E |
| Billibah | Balranald Shire | 33°09′39″S 143°48′14″E |
| Bonton | Central Darling Shire | 32°38′35″S 143°53′35″E |
| Bonuna | Central Darling Shire | 32°37′49″S 144°14′49″E |
| Burkett North | Balranald Shire | 33°33′06″S 143°16′45″E |
| Burnaby | Balranald Shire | 33°16′11″S 143°36′48″E |
| Casey | Central Darling Shire | 32°59′37″S 143°50′28″E |
| Coonartha | Central Darling Shire | 32°34′13″S 143°43′39″E |
| Darnick | Central Darling Shire | 32°52′15″S 143°41′04″E |
| Darwin | Balranald Shire | 33°15′30″S 144°08′10″E |
| Eildon | Central Darling Shire | 32°47′21″S 143°30′50″E |
| Gerathula | Central Darling Shire | 33°02′47″S 143°49′57″E |
| Gol Gol | Balranald Shire | 33°32′37″S 143°24′43″E |
| Goondoola | Balranald Shire | 33°22′23″S 143°57′01″E |
| Goorah | Central Darling Shire | 32°43′56″S 143°41′25″E |
| Griffin | Balranald Shire | 33°18′32″S 144°08′05″E |
| Gunarramby | Balranald Shire | 33°09′20″S 143°59′15″E |
| Kasserhill | Wentworth Shire | 33°02′59″S 143°28′50″E |
| Katabritoi | Central Darling Shire | 33°00′52″S 144°11′06″E |
| Khartoum | Wentworth Shire | 33°06′26″S 143°28′14″E |
| Kilfera | Central Darling Shire | 32°35′45″S 144°04′38″E |
| Leura | Balranald Shire | 33°11′53″S 143°37′45″E |
| Manara Parish | Central Darling Shire | unknown |
| Mandellman | Balranald Shire | 33°24′01″S 143°25′59″E |
| Matheson | Central Darling Shire | 32°49′35″S 144°12′59″E |
| Moornanyah | Central Darling Shire | 33°06′05″S 143°59′47″E |
| Mulurula | Balranald Shire | 33°20′04″S 143°24′13″E |
| Nangutyah | Central Darling Shire | 32°58′10″S 144°01′20″E |
| Oberwells | Balranald Shire | 33°25′52″S 143°45′13″E |
| Pentole | Central Darling Shire | 32°58′37″S 143°40′06″E |
| Spencer | Balranald Shire | 33°29′00″S 144°06′39″E |
| Taylor | Balranald Shire | 33°14′03″S 143°47′37″E |
| Thumulah | Central Darling Shire | 32°42′23″S 143°53′13″E |
| Till Till | Balranald Shire | 33°34′59″S 143°45′30″E |
| Umalee | Central Darling Shire | 32°43′32″S 144°03′30″E |
| Waugh | Balranald Shire | 33°25′32″S 144°04′48″E |
| Wellesley | Balranald Shire | 33°23′25″S 143°46′27″E |
| Whitminbah | Central Darling Shire | 33°05′21″S 144°10′26″E |
| Woolpagerie North | Balranald Shire | 33°30′34″S 143°34′22″E |
| Yelty | Central Darling Shire | 32°55′48″S 144°11′55″E |
| Yhoul | Balranald Shire | unknown |
| Youngila South | Balranald Shire | 33°28′00″S 143°56′05″E |
