= Amphitheatre, New South Wales =

Civil parish in Australia

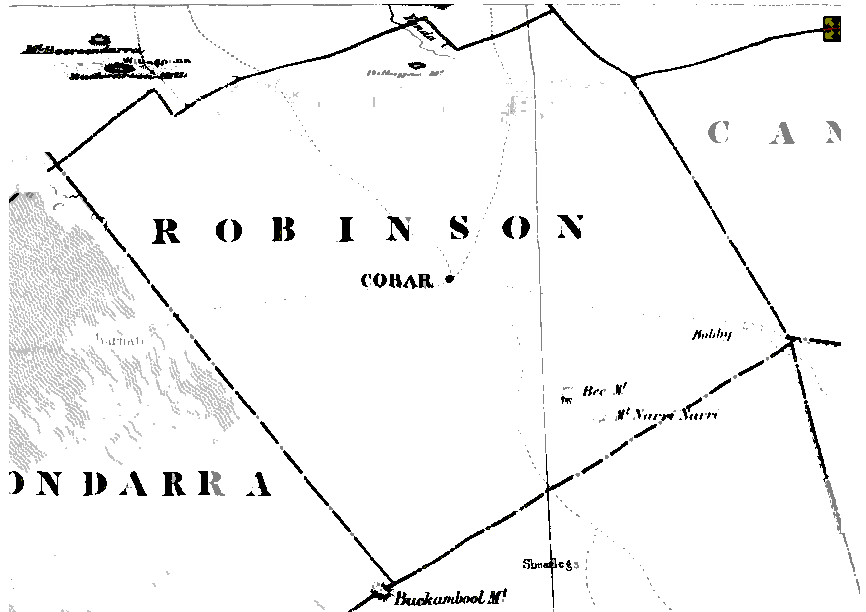
Robinson county in 1886

Amphitheatre Parish is a civil parish of Robinson County, New South Wales, Australia.

== Geography ==
The parish is located on the Barrier Highway between Cubba and Cobar. The parish on Buckwaroon Creek has a flat topography and is vegetated by a sparse shrub cover.
