= Conoble, Mossgiel =

Locality in New South Wales, Australia

Conoble, New South Wales is a civil parish and a rural locality of Far West, New South Wales.

== Locality ==
Conoble is located at 32º 53' 23.96" S 144º 46' 9.6" E, 778km from Sydney, west of the nearest town, Roto but within the boundary of the locality of Ivanhoe, New South Wales. Conoble is between the Lachlan and Darling Rivers in New South Wales, Australia. It is located within the Central Darling Shire local government area and is on the Broken Hill railway line.

The parish and locality are within the traditional lands of the Wangaibon people, and today are in Central Darling Shire.

== Geography ==
The Australian Bureau of Meteorology classify this area as the Hot Dry Zone (with cooler winters). Places in this zone can be very hot in the summer months while in the winter, nights can be very cold. Because of the hot and arid climate there are no towns within Conoble although a now disused Railway platform was operated from 1919 until 1986. the nearest railway station is now at Ivanhoe, 50 kilometers to the west.

The ephemeral Conoble Lake is a main feature of the landscape. Conoble is 97.2 meters above Sea level.
