= Yanda language =

Australian Aboriginal language of Queensland

Yanda
- Native to: Australia
- Region: "Karna–Mari fringe", Queensland
- Ethnicity: Yanda
- Extinct: c. 1900s
- Language family: Pama–Nyungan: (unclassified, possibly Maric); Guwa–Yanda; Yanda

Language codes
- ISO 639-3: yda
- Glottolog: yand1251
- AIATSIS: G9
- ELP: Yanda

Yanda is an extinct and poorly attested Australian Aboriginal language of Queensland, known from a single wordlist from 1886. It was apparently close to Guwa.

== History ==
In 1878, the Yanda people numbered only 100; their numbers were later reduced to 50 people, encompassing 15 men, 20 women, and 15 children. By the 1970s, only a few old people still remembered the name, and could not recall anything else.

=== Documentation ===
The only documentation of Yanda comes from a wordlist recorded by the police officer Ernest Eglinton and published in Edward Micklethwaite Curr's book The Australian Race in 1886. According to Gavan Breen, the transcription of the wordlist is of very poor quality. However, Eglinton also recorded vocabularies for Yalarnnga and Pitta Pitta, for which modern linguistic data exists, and thus can be compared with each other.

== Geographical distribution ==
Norman Tindale placed the Yanda at the head of the Hamilton River, to the north of Warenda.

== Phonology ==
The transcription of the Yanda wordlist is highly inaccurate. The following information is rather uncertain, especially concerning the rhotics and laterals. However, Breen did not believe that the phonological system of Yanda was "any more dissimilar from its neighbours than they are from one another".

=== Consonants ===
		Peripheral		Laminal		Apical	
		Labial	Velar	Dental	Palatal	Alveolar	Retroflex
Plosive		p	k	t̪	c	t	ʈ
Nasal		m	ŋ	n̪	ɲ	n	ɳ
Rhotic	trill					r	
Rhotic	tap					ɾ	
Lateral				(l̪)	(ʎ)	l	ɭ
Approximant		w			j		ɻ

Breen identified two laminal series in Eglinton's wordlist and believed that "slight evidence" existed for two apical series as well. The number of rhotics and laterals is indeterminable.

=== Vowels ===
According to Breen, the vowels of Yanda can be "safely" assumed to be a three-vowel system /i, a, u/. He did not believe it was necessary to introduce vowel length into Yanda phonology.

=== Phonotactics ===
Breen believed that the only possible syllable types in Yanda were CV and CVC, where C represents any consonant and V any vowel, though most words end in a vowel.

== Morphology ==
=== Case ===
Breen identified a locative case -nga in the word wikanga 'tomorrow', also found in the equivalent word in Kuungkari.

== Vocabulary ==
Eglinton noted that a singular word was used to describe both 'bone' and 'wood'.
