= Ivanhoe (Warakirri) Correctional Centre =

Australian minimum security prison

- Interactive map of Ivanhoe (Warakirri) Correctional Centre
- Location: Ivanhoe, New South Wales; 32°54′55″S 144°18′39″E
- Status: Operational
- Security class: Minimum
- Capacity: 55
- Managed by: Corrective Services NSW

The Ivanhoe (Warakirri) Correctional Centre, a former Australian minimum security prison for males, is located in Ivanhoe, New South Wales. The centre was operated by Corrective Services NSW an agency of the Department of Attorney General and Justice of the Government of New South Wales. The centre detained sentenced and remand prisoners under New South Wales and/or Commonwealth legislation.

The centre detained up to 55 prisoners who performed cleaning and maintenance tasks, as well as participating in community projects and the mobile outreach program. Inmates may also undertake education programs, including numeracy and literacy, and self-awareness and alcohol- and substance-abuse management programs.

The prison closed in June 2020, with Corrective Services NSW noting that more modern prisons had been built elsewhere in the New South Wales.

== See also ==
- Punishment in Australia
