= Dunlop Parish (Yanda County) =

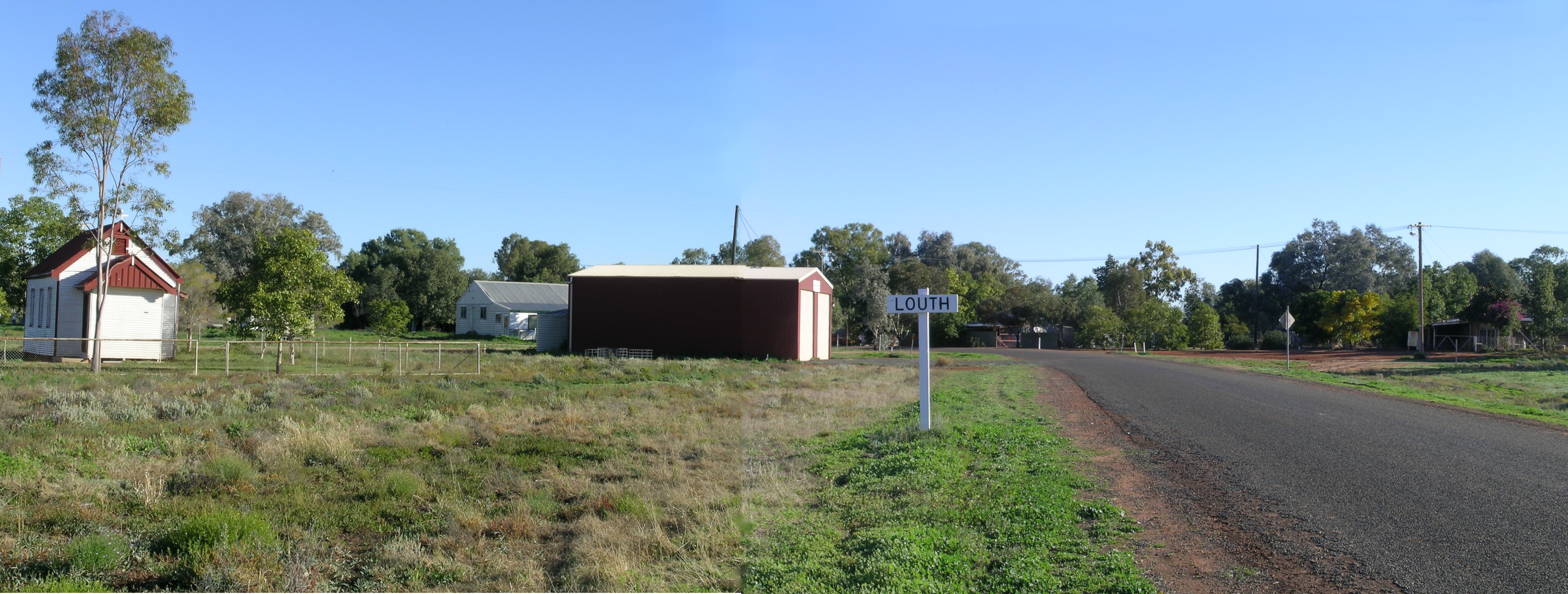

- Coordinates: 30°32′0″S 145°07′0″E
- Country: Australia
- State: New South Wales
- LGA: Bourke Shire

Government
  - State electorate: Barwon
  - Federal division: Parkes
- Elevation: 100 m (330 ft)
- Postcode: 2840

Dunlop Parish is a civil parish, of Yanda County, a cadasteral division of New South Wales; a Cadastral division of New South Wales.

== Location ==
The Parish is on the Darling River upstream of Wilcannia, New South Wales and down stream of Bourke, New South Wales.

The only town of the parish is Louth, New South Wales.

== Geography ==
The topography is flat with a Köppen climate classification of BsK (Hot semi arid).

The economy in the parish is based on broad acre agriculture, mainly Wheat, and sheep.

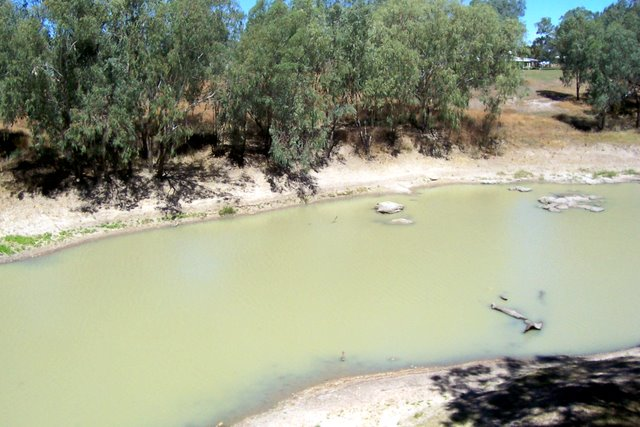
Darling River Dunlop Parish

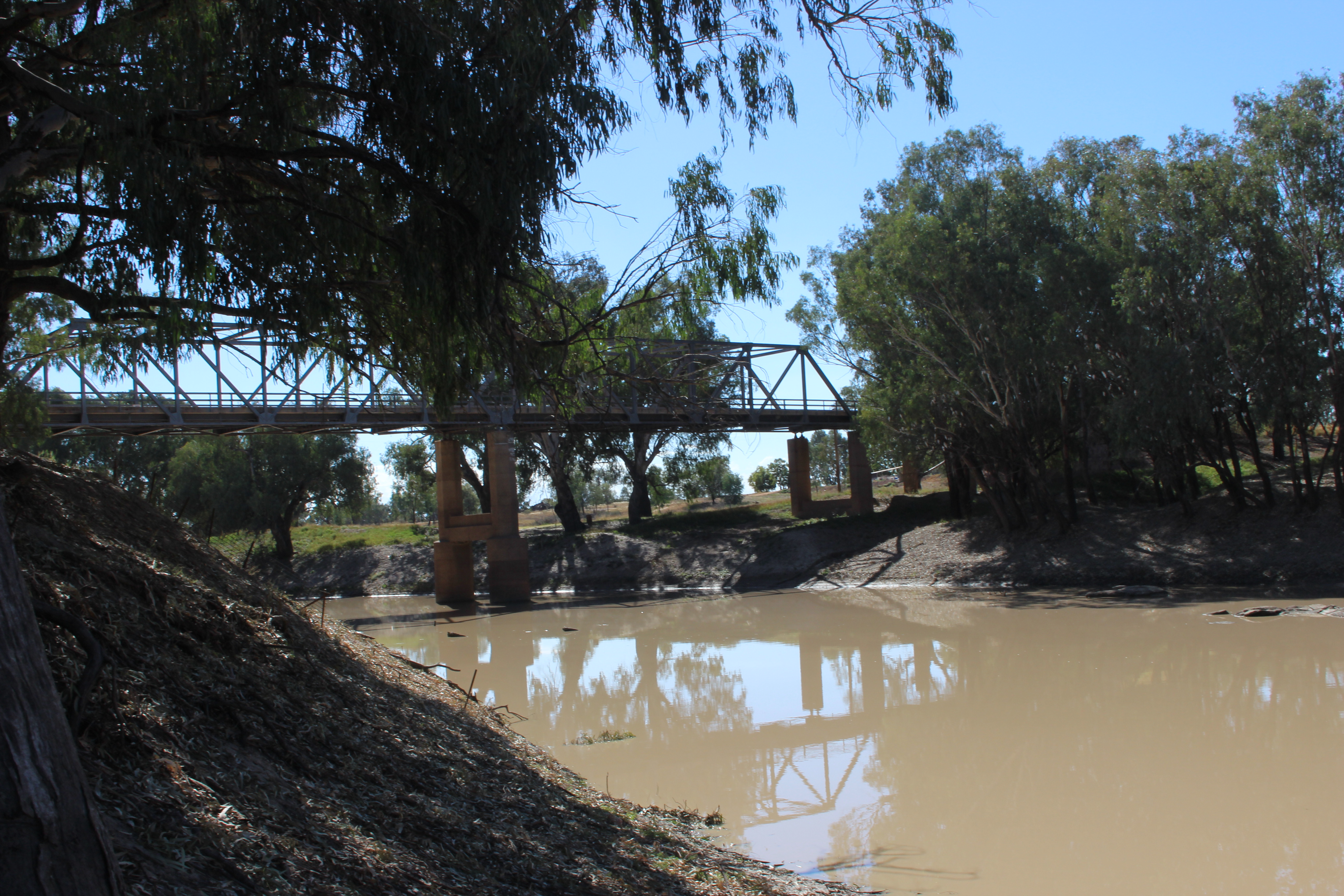
Louth bridge 1.JPG Dunlop Parish

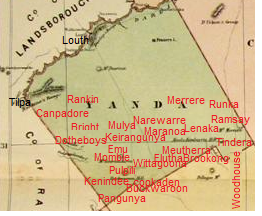

The Dunlop Ranges are in the parish.

== History ==
The traditional owners of the area are the Barkindji people, The first European to the area was Thomas Mitchell (explorer).

In 1859 when Thomas Andrew Mathews, an Irish immigrant from County Louth, built a pub to serve the passing trade along the Darling River.

In 1888 the first mechanised shearing of sheep, in the world, took place at Sir Samuel McCaughey's Dunlop Station.
