= Canpadore, Yanda =

Civil parish in New South Wales, Australia

Canpadore Parish, Yanda County in Bourke Shire is a civil parish of Yanda County, a cadasteral division of New South Wales; a Cadastral division of New South Wales.

== Geography ==
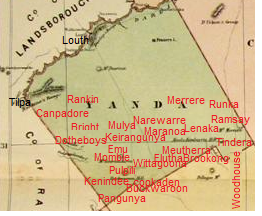
Map of Yanda County (NSW), Australia

The Parish is in the Darling River floodplain upstream of Wilcannia, New South Wales; a Cadastral division of New South Wales. and is located at 30°46′53″S 144°49′26″E.

The topography is flat with a Köppen climate classification of BsK (Hot semi arid).

The economy in the parish is based on broad acre agriculture, mainly wheat and sheep.

== History ==
The traditional owners of the area are the Barkindji people, and the first European to the area was Major Mitchells expedition.
