= Rankin County, New South Wales =

Rankin New South Wales
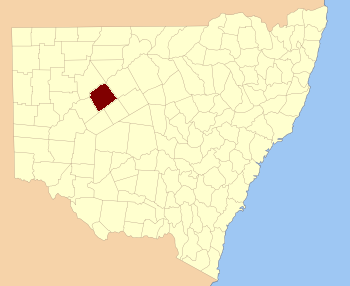
- Location in New South Wales
Lands administrative divisions around Rankin:
Killara	Landsborough	Yanda
Killara	Rankin	Robinson
Werunda	Woore	Booroondarra

Rankin County is one of the 141 cadastral divisions of New South Wales. It includes part of the Paroo-Darling National Park. The border to the north-west is the Darling River.

Rankin County was named after Rankin Range – Mount Rankin which is in Bathurst, New South Wales.

== Parishes within this county ==
A full list of parishes found within this county; their current LGA and mapping coordinates to the approximate centre of each location is as follows:

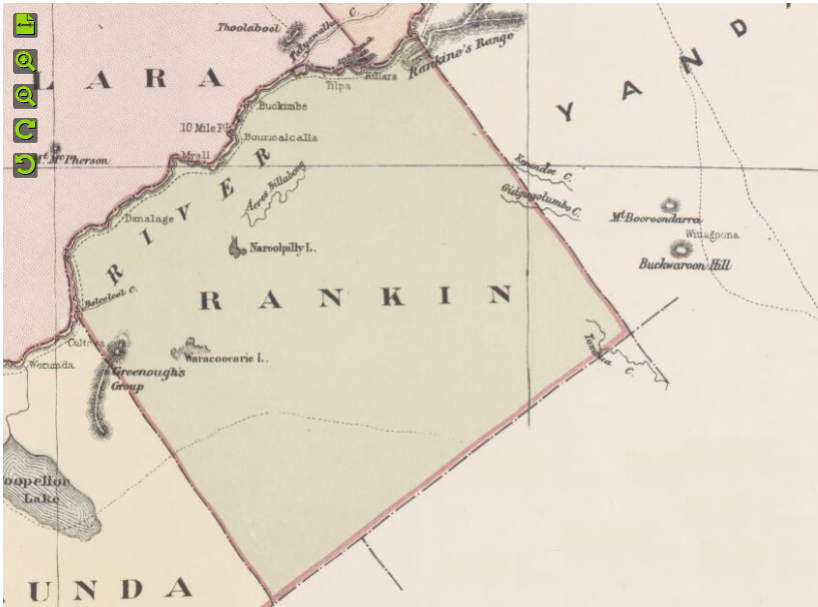
Map of Rankin County from John Sands 1886 Atlas of Australia.

Parish	LGA	Coordinates
Albert	Cobar Shire	31°02′03″S 144°44′21″E
Basin Bank	Cobar Shire	31°23′39″S 144°18′01″E
Bilbo	Cobar Shire	31°19′24″S 144°38′12″E
Booborowie	Cobar Shire	31°13′01″S 144°19′55″E
Buckinbe	Cobar Shire	30°59′39″S 144°30′07″E
Budda	Cobar Shire	31°07′15″S 144°16′48″E
Bulla Bulla	Cobar Shire	31°34′56″S 144°46′17″E
Clarke	Cobar Shire	31°28′54″S 144°40′00″E
Coombes	Cobar Shire	31°24′10″S 144°44′00″E
Darling	Cobar Shire	31°20′46″S 144°10′34″E
Deniehy	Cobar Shire	31°29′22″S 144°54′28″E
Donald Plain	Cobar Shire	31°34′47″S 144°31′49″E
Donalroe	Cobar Shire	31°11′32″S 144°10′24″E
Etty	Cobar Shire	31°23′10″S 144°58′31″E
Gidgiegalumba	Cobar Shire	31°02′20″S 144°50′58″E
Greenough	Cobar Shire	unknown
Keilor	Cobar Shire	31°27′59″S 144°15′10″E
Kendall	Cobar Shire	31°24′00″S 144°29′33″E
Kirkingle	Cobar Shire	31°12′46″S 144°32′56″E
Lawrence	Cobar Shire	31°19′25″S 144°50′11″E
Mary	Cobar Shire	31°07′11″S 144°27′47″E
Millpillbury	Cobar Shire	31°19′54″S 144°23′39″E
Mulga	Cobar Shire	31°30′51″S 144°22′54″E
Munbunya	Cobar Shire	31°08′57″S 144°41′24″E
Salisbury	Central Darling Shire	unknown
Stanley	Cobar Shire	31°38′24″S 144°37′04″E
Stanley	Cobar Shire	31°39′34″S 144°36′26″E
Tankarook	Cobar Shire	31°02′14″S 144°25′37″E
Thourumble	Cobar Shire	31°09′25″S 144°54′11″E
Turner	Cobar Shire	31°19′36″S 145°05′39″E
Wallandra	Cobar Shire	30°55′11″S 144°33′51″E
Weelong	Bourke Shire	30°54′54″S 144°43′48″E
Weelongbar	Cobar Shire	30°58′40″S 144°44′43″E
Wigilla	Cobar Shire	31°13′03″S 144°44′01″E
Woore	Cobar Shire	31°43′54″S 144°32′19″E
Woore	Cobar Shire	31°46′36″S 144°29′56″E
