= Lilliane Brady =

Australian politician (1930–2021)

Councillor Lilliane Brady OAM

Mayor of Cobar Shire
- In office 2007 – February 2021
- In office 2001–2004
- In office September 1995 – September 1999

Councillor, Cobar Shire
- In office September 1995 – February 2021
- In office 1974–1987

Personal details
- Born: 29 December 1930 Lake Cargelligo, New South Wales, Australia
- Died: 7 February 2021 (aged 90) Cobar, New South Wales, Australia
- Party: Independent

Lilliane Olive Brady OAM (29 December 1930 – 7 February 2021) was an Australian local politician in New South Wales. She served as mayor of Cobar Shire for more than 20 years, and sat on the local council for 40 years. At the time of her death she was the longest-serving female mayor in New South Wales' history.

== Early life ==
Brady was born at Lake Cargelligo on 29 December 1930. She moved from Sydney to Cobar with her husband and children in November 1964. Her initial reaction was that it was "the most god forsaken town I had ever seen and I didn’t want to get out of the car", but she soon regarded it as "one of the best places on Earth" after meeting members of the local community.

== Political career ==
In 1974 Brady first stood for Cobar Shire Council at a by-election, and was elected. She entered politics in response to an incident where a Cobar resident died alone after being transferred to Orange, New South Wales, as Cobar did not have an aged care facility. She secured funding for such a facility, which opened in 1982 and was named the Lilliane Brady Village. Brady did not serve on the council between 1987 and 1995 as she was focused on running her family's property.

Brady served as mayor on three occasions. The first was between September 1995 and September 1999, the second from 2001 to 2004 and the third from 2007 until her death in office in February 2021. These periods in office made her Cobar's longest-serving mayor. She gained a reputation for being a strong advocate for the community, and achieved improvements to local infrastructure and services. Brady was also regarded as a plain speaker, and someone who did not suffer fools. The Land noted that she was "as much feared as revered" among other politicians due to her determination to get "things done for Cobar", and "often left people wondering where they stood after a spray". Brady described herself as a "no bullshit mayor". She became the longest-serving female mayor in NSW history in September 2018.

Brady received several awards for her local government service. In 2012 she received the Medal of the Order of Australia for "service to local government, and to the community of Cobar". In 2018 she was the first person to receive a Lifetime Achievement Award from Local Government NSW. She was also the inaugural recipient of the Minister for Local Government Award for Women in September 2020, which recognised her efforts to increase women's participation in local government. NSW Premier Gladys Berejiklian presented Brady with the award during a visit to Cobar in December 2020. Brady was proud of having served on a number of local government and industry bodies, including being the first female president of the Western Division Group of Shires. She was featured in an episode of the ABC series Back Roads which was broadcast in February 2021.

== Personal life ==
Brady had three children and her husband Allan Brady was a local doctor for many years. He died in 2010. She enjoyed following horse racing and owned several race horses. Brady also owned three properties.

On 7 February 2021 Brady died aged 90 at Cobar District Hospital. She had been planning to retire from local government in September 2021. Cobar Shire Deputy Mayor Peter Abbott described her as an "absolute icon in this neck of the woods" and someone with "a reputation as being as hard as nails but that was just part of her trying to get things done for Cobar". The NSW Government and Opposition issued statements praising Brady's contributions to her community. She was accorded a state funeral, which was held in Cobar on 19 February 2021. All of the town's shops and cafes closed during the funeral as a mark of respect, and 256 council employees, firefighters and members of the public formed a guard of honour for her coffin.
