= Cumbedore, Yanda =

Civil parish of New South Wales, Australia

Cumbedore Parish, Yanda County in Bourke Shire is a civil parish of Yanda County, a cadasteral division of New South Wales.

== Geography ==
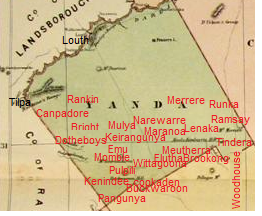
Map of Yanda County (NSW) Australia

The parish is on the Darling River upstream of Wilcannia, New South Wales; it is a cadastral division of New South Wales, and is located at 30.4653°S 144.4926°E.

The topography is flat with a Köppen climate classification of BsK (hot semi-arid).

The economy in the parish is based on broad acre agriculture, mainly wheat and sheep.

The traditional owners of the area are the Barkindji people.
