= Yanda Parish (Yanda County) =

Yanda Parish, (Yanda County) is a civil parish, of Yanda County, a cadasteral division of New South Wales; a Cadastral division of New South Wales.

== Geography ==
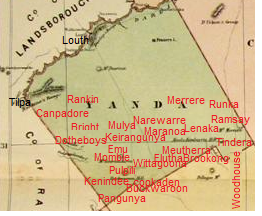
Map of Yanda County (NSW) Australia

The topography is flat with a Köppen climate classification of BsK (Hot semi arid). The climate is characterised by hot summers and mild winters. The annual average rainfall is 350 mm, although this is highly variable.

Much of the Parish is in the Gundabooka National Park and adjoining conservation area.
