= Yanda Li =

Yanda Li from the Tsinghua University, Beijing, China was named Fellow of the Institute of Electrical and Electronics Engineers (IEEE) in 2013 for contributions to research and education in signal processing and bioinformatics.
