= Yanda County =

Yanda New South Wales
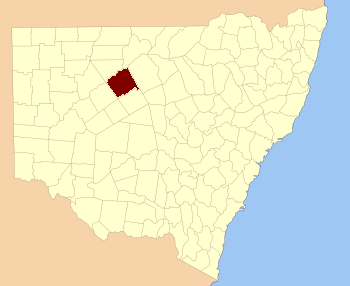
- Location in New South Wales
Lands administrative divisions around Yanda:
Landsborough	Gunderbooka	Cowper
Killara	Yanda	Cowper
Rankin	Booroondarra	Robinson

Yanda County is one of the 141 cadastral divisions of New South Wales. The Darling River is the north-western boundary.

The name Yanda is believed to be derived from a local Aboriginal word.

== Parishes within this county ==
A full list of parishes found within this county; their current LGA and mapping coordinates to the approximate centre of each location is as follows:

Parish	LGA	Coordinates
Bimbera	Bourke Shire	30°40′02″S 145°41′39″E
Bonita	Cobar Shire	30°46′32″S 145°23′35″E
Booroondara	Cobar Shire	31°04′55″S 145°22′13″E
Bright	Cobar Shire	31°00′35″S 145°02′49″E
Brookong	Cobar Shire	31°02′19″S 145°37′19″E
Buckwaroon	Cobar Shire	31°13′41″S 145°17′21″E
Bundaline	Cobar Shire	31°03′46″S 145°14′50″E
Canpadore	Bourke Shire	30°53′06″S 144°51′15″E
Cookadini	Cobar Shire	31°12′21″S 145°27′41″E
Cumbedore	Bourke Shire	30°46′53″S 144°49′26″E
Darling	Bourke Shire	30°42′22″S 144°55′32″E
Derrina	Cobar Shire	30°48′51″S 145°09′45″E
Dootheboy	Cobar Shire	30°56′56″S 144°57′15″E
Dunlop	Bourke Shire	
Elutha	Cobar Shire	31°09′58″S 145°33′28″E
Emu	Cobar Shire	31°00′19″S 145°11′41″E
Gellabudda	Bourke Shire	30°42′17″S 145°17′21″E
Ginnewandinia	Bourke Shire	30°38′20″S 145°29′39″E
Gonella	Bourke Shire	30°47′03″S 145°40′38″E
Goonie	Bourke Shire	30°40′36″S 145°25′28″E
Gumhall	Cobar Shire	30°51′55″S 145°44′44″E
Gundabooka	Bourke Shire	30°48′57″S 145°48′36″E
Keirangunyah	Cobar Shire	30°57′47″S 145°19′14″E
Kenindee	Cobar Shire	31°05′41″S 145°03′42″E
Kerie	Bourke Shire	30°32′47″S 145°14′47″E
Lenakka	Cobar Shire	30°56′56″S 145°36′45″E
Maranoa	Cobar Shire	31°02′18″S 145°28′23″E
Merrere	Cobar Shire	30°57′59″S 145°47′59″E
Meutherra	Cobar Shire	31°03′14″S 145°34′14″E
Mitchell	Bourke Shire	30°35′27″S 145°33′31″E
Momble	Cobar Shire	31°09′08″S 145°06′52″E
Mookalimbirria	Cobar Shire	31°01′44″S 145°50′30″E
Mulga	Cobar Shire	30°51′02″S 145°21′06″E
Mulya	Cobar Shire	30°53′42″S 145°12′46″E
Narwarre	Cobar Shire	30°53′21″S 145°25′07″E
Pangunya	Cobar Shire	31°15′29″S 145°08′16″E
Penilui	Bourke Shire	30°48′24″S 145°36′14″E
Pulpulla	Cobar Shire	31°10′14″S 145°14′16″E
Ramsay	Cobar Shire	30°58′31″S 145°56′54″E
Runker	Cobar Shire	30°55′55″S 145°52′13″E
Salisbury	Bourke Shire	30°47′02″S 145°00′09″E
Tatiara	Bourke Shire	30°28′41″S 145°20′46″E
Tigeralba	Bourke Shire	30°34′13″S 145°23′42″E
Tinderra	Cobar Shire	31°02′08″S 145°56′28″E
Toburra	Cobar Shire	30°53′36″S 145°37′59″E
Trethella	Bourke Shire	30°50′41″S 145°31′40″E
Tyngin	Cobar Shire	30°55′39″S 145°29′11″E
Warrego	Bourke Shire	30°29′40″S 145°31′09″E
Winbar	Bourke Shire	
Winderra	Bourke Shire	30°39′04″S 145°18′52″E
Wittagoona	Cobar Shire	31°08′35″S 145°25′04″E
Woodhouse	Cobar Shire	31°06′04″S 145°51′42″E
Woolla	Bourke Shire	30°25′00″S 145°28′51″E
Yanda	Bourke Shire	30°31′17″S 145°36′29″E
Yandagulla	Bourke Shire	30°30′55″S 145°11′12″E
