= Yanda people =

Aboriginal Australian people

The Yanda were an indigenous Australian people of the state of Queensland.

== Country ==
The Yanda lived north of Warenda about the headwaters of the Hamilton River tributary of the Georgina River, and had, according to Norman Tindale's calculations, tribal lands of some 3,100 square miles (8,000 km^{2}). They were also the indigenous people of Toolebuc and Lucknow.

== Social organization and customs ==
The Yanda were the most easterly aboriginal tribe to have accepted both circumcision and subincision into their initiatory rites. On ceremonial occasions, Yanda women adorned themselves with a distinctive ornament called a bowra, fashioned from two kangaroo teeth, fixed together with sinews and resins at the base. They consumed pituri by chewing on a compound of it made with the ashes of gidea leaves.

== History of contact ==
Yanda lands were first occupied by whites in 1878, at which time they were estimated to number some 100, several of them octogenarians. Within less than a decade, the figure had been halved, with the remnant of 50 consisting of 15 men, 20 women and 15 children.

== Alternative names ==
- Janda
- Yunda

== Some words ==
- mikamo (tame/wild dog)
- koopoon (father)
- yunganna (mother)
- gungi / goongin (white man)

== Sources ==
- "AIATSIS map of Indigenous Australia". AIATSIS. 14 May 2024.
- Eglinton, Ernest (1886). "Head of the Hamilton River" (PDF). In Curr, Edward Micklethwaite (ed.). The Australian race: its origin, languages, customs, place of landing in Australia and the routes by which it spread itself over the continent. Vol. 2. Melbourne: J. Ferres. pp. 360–363.
- Roth, W. E. (1897). Ethnological Studies among the North-West-Central Queensland Aborigines (PDF). Brisbane: Edmund Gregory, Government Printer.
- Tindale, Norman Barnett (1974). "Janda (QLD)". Aboriginal Tribes of Australia: Their Terrain, Environmental Controls, Distribution, Limits, and Proper Names. Australian National University Press. ISBN 978-0-708-10741-6. Archived from the original on 10 January 2018.
