= Louth, New South Wales =

Louth
- Town
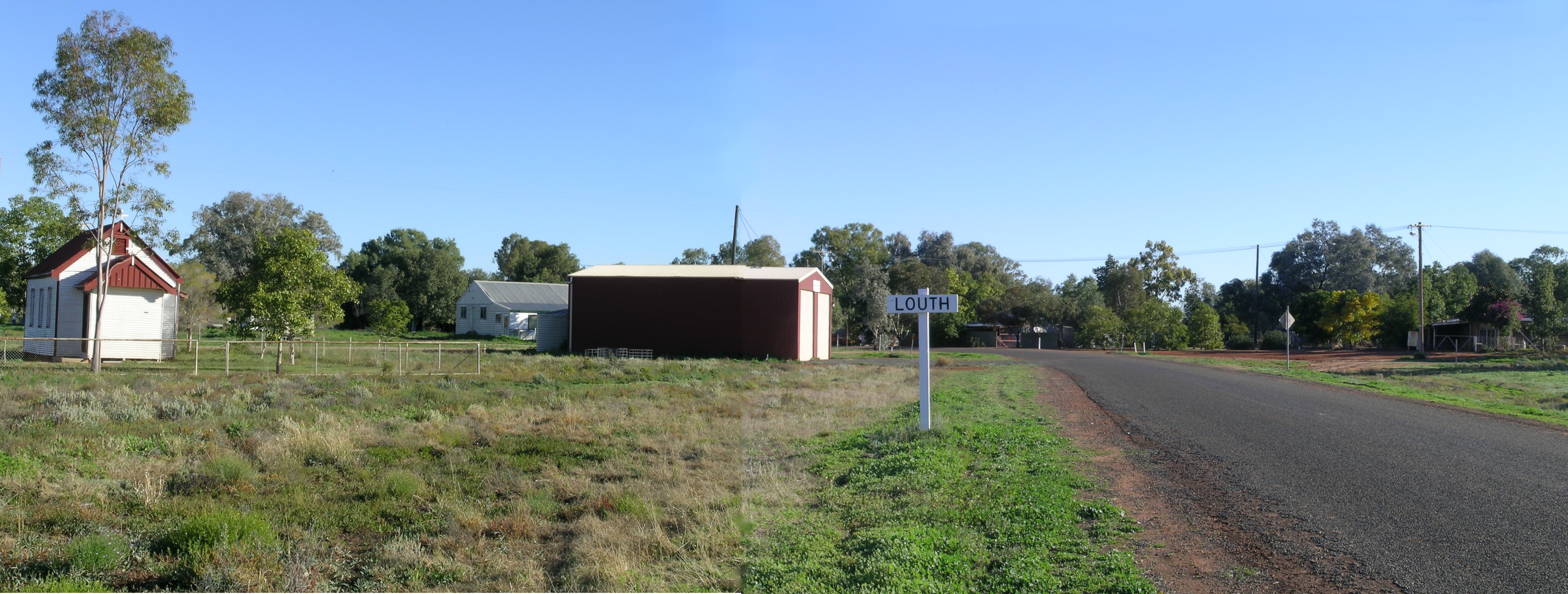

- Coordinates: 30°32′0″S 145°07′0″E
- Country: Australia
- State: New South Wales
- LGA: Bourke Shire
- Location: 830 km (520 mi) NW of Sydney; 428 km (266 mi) NW of Dubbo; 132 km (82 mi) NW of Cobar; 99 km (62 mi) SW of Bourke

Government
  - State electorate: Barwon
  - Federal division: Parkes
- Elevation: 100 m (330 ft)

Population
  - Total: 43 (2016 census)
- Postcode: 2840
- County: Yanda County
- Parish: Dunlop Parish

Louth is a village on the eastern side of the Darling River in New South Wales, Australia. The village is in Bourke Shire, 99 kilometres (62 mi) south west of Bourke and 132 kilometres (82 mi) north west of Cobar. The town is made famous by the Louth Races which are held in August each year, attracting crowds of nearly five thousand. At the 2021 census, Louth and the surrounding region had a population of 74.

The town was established in 1859 by an Irish immigrant from County Louth, Thomas Andrew Mathews, who built a pub to serve the passing trade along the then busy Darling River. At one stage the town grew to have three hotels, a cordial factory, three bakeries, two butchers, a post office, three churches, a Chinese garden, a general store and a police station. The post office still remains and has been beautifully restored.

When T.A. Mathew's first wife, Mary Mathews, died in 1886, he had a unique headstone built that is now an Australian National Monument. At dusk each night, the cross reflects the setting sun across the town acting as a beacon of light that on the anniversary of her death lights up the doorstep of where her family home once stood.

In 1888 the first mechanised shearing of sheep, in the world, took place at Sir Samuel McCaughey's Dunlop Station, a property located within the Louth district.
