= Ivanhoe, New South Wales =

Ivanhoe
- Town
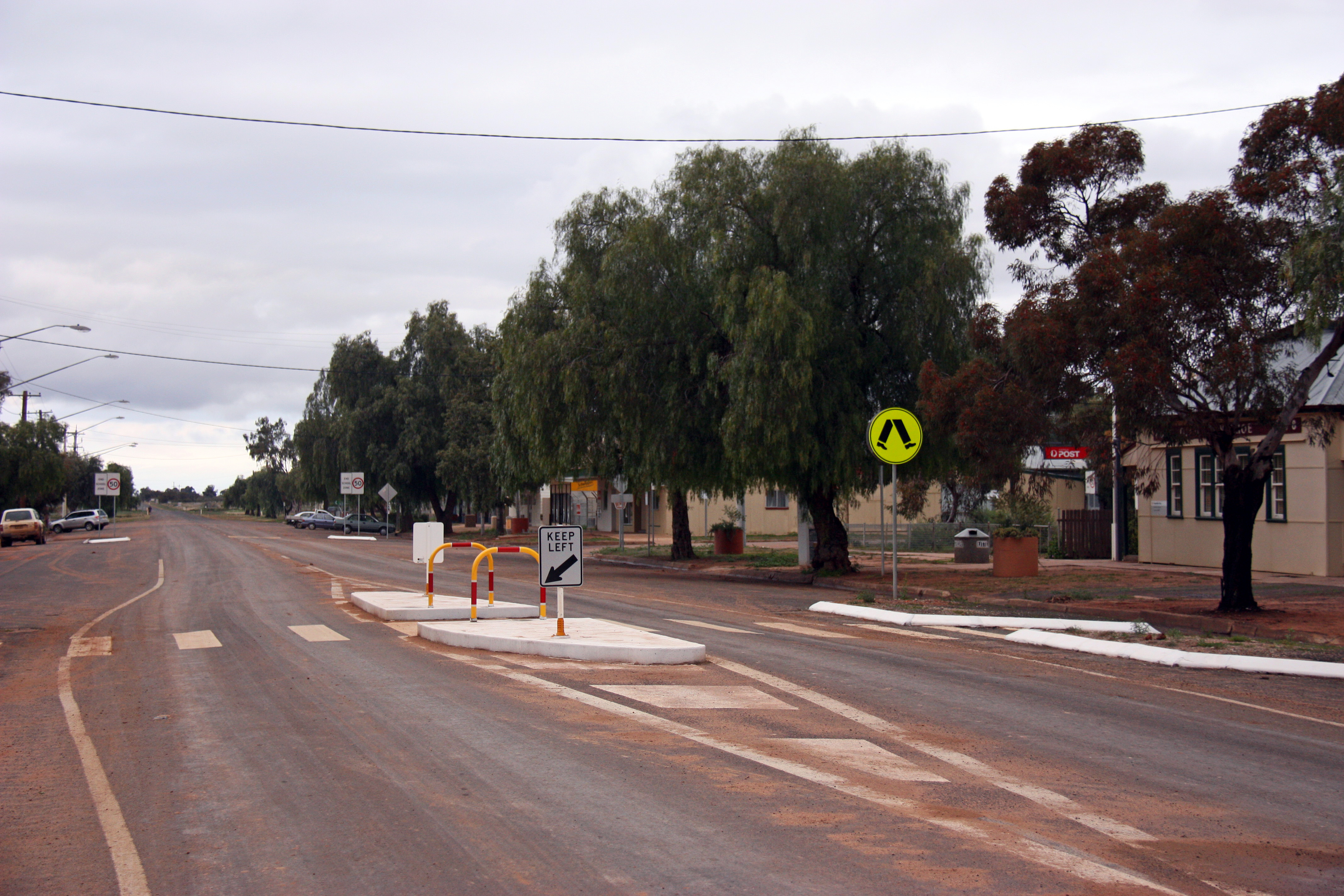
- Cobb Highway in Ivanhoe, 2010

- Coordinates: 32°54′59″S 144°17′58″E
- Country: Australia
- State: New South Wales
- LGA: Central Darling Shire
- Location: 800 km (500 mi) WNW of Sydney; 209 km (130 mi) NNW of Hay; 317 km (197 mi) ESE of Broken Hill

Government
  - State electorate: Barwon
  - Federal divisions: Parkes; Farrer
- Elevation: 90.0 m (295.3 ft)

Population
  - Total: 162 (2021 census)
- Postcode: 2878
- County: Manara
- Mean max temp: 25.9 °C (78.6 °F)
- Mean min temp: 10.7 °C (51.3 °F)
- Annual rainfall: 306.0 mm (12.05 in)

Ivanhoe is a very small township on the Cobb Highway between the Lachlan and Darling rivers in western New South Wales, Australia. It is located within the Central Darling Shire local government area. Ivanhoe functions as a service centre for the surrounding area. The township is characterised by a particularly wide high street. At the 2021 census, Ivanhoe had a population of 162.

The town was founded in the early 1870s, and was named after Sir Walter Scott's work of historical fiction, Ivanhoe. The township was situated on well-used coach and stock routes connecting Wilcannia on the Darling River with Balranald on the Murrumbidgee and Booligal on the Lachlan.

== History ==
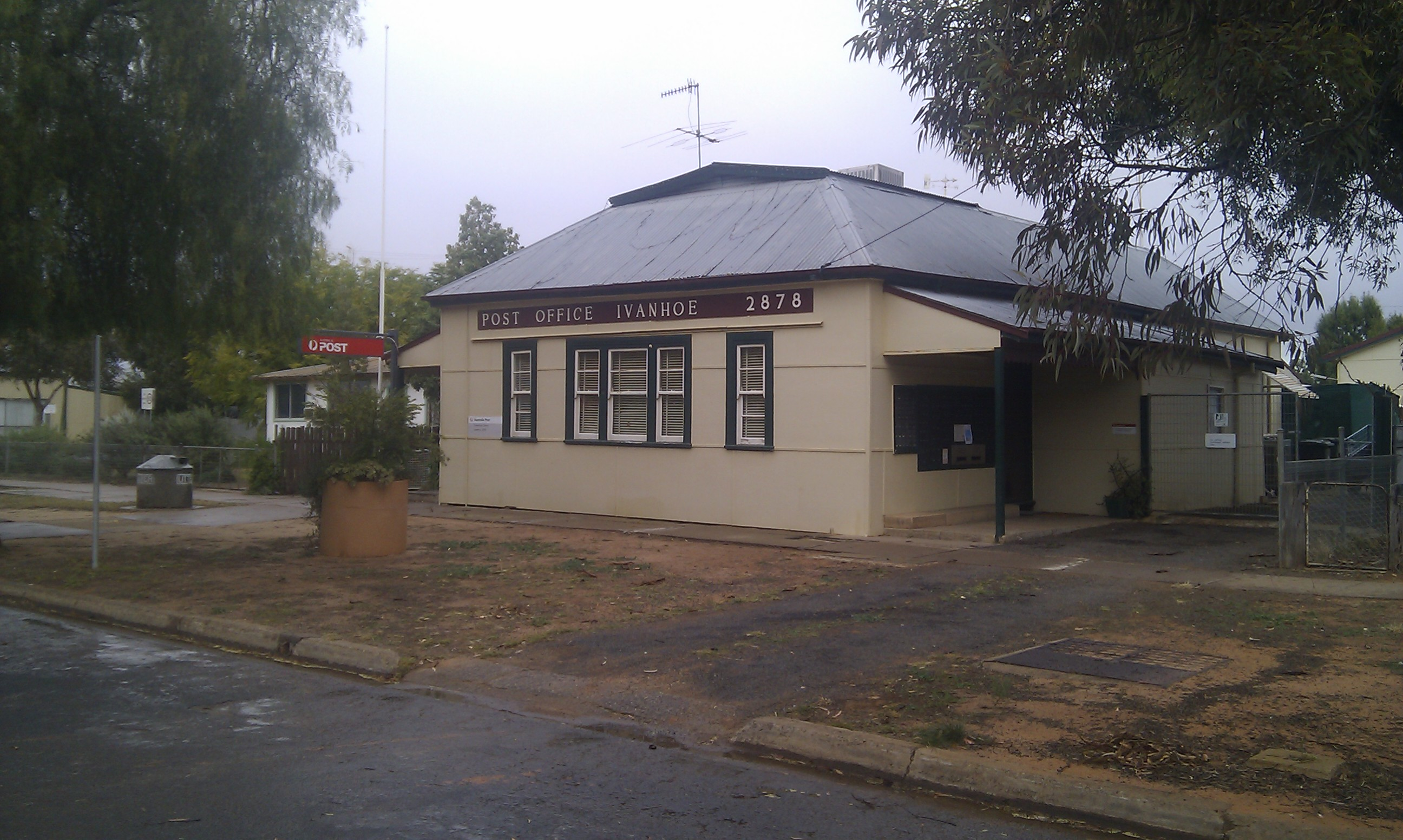
Ivanhoe post office, 2011

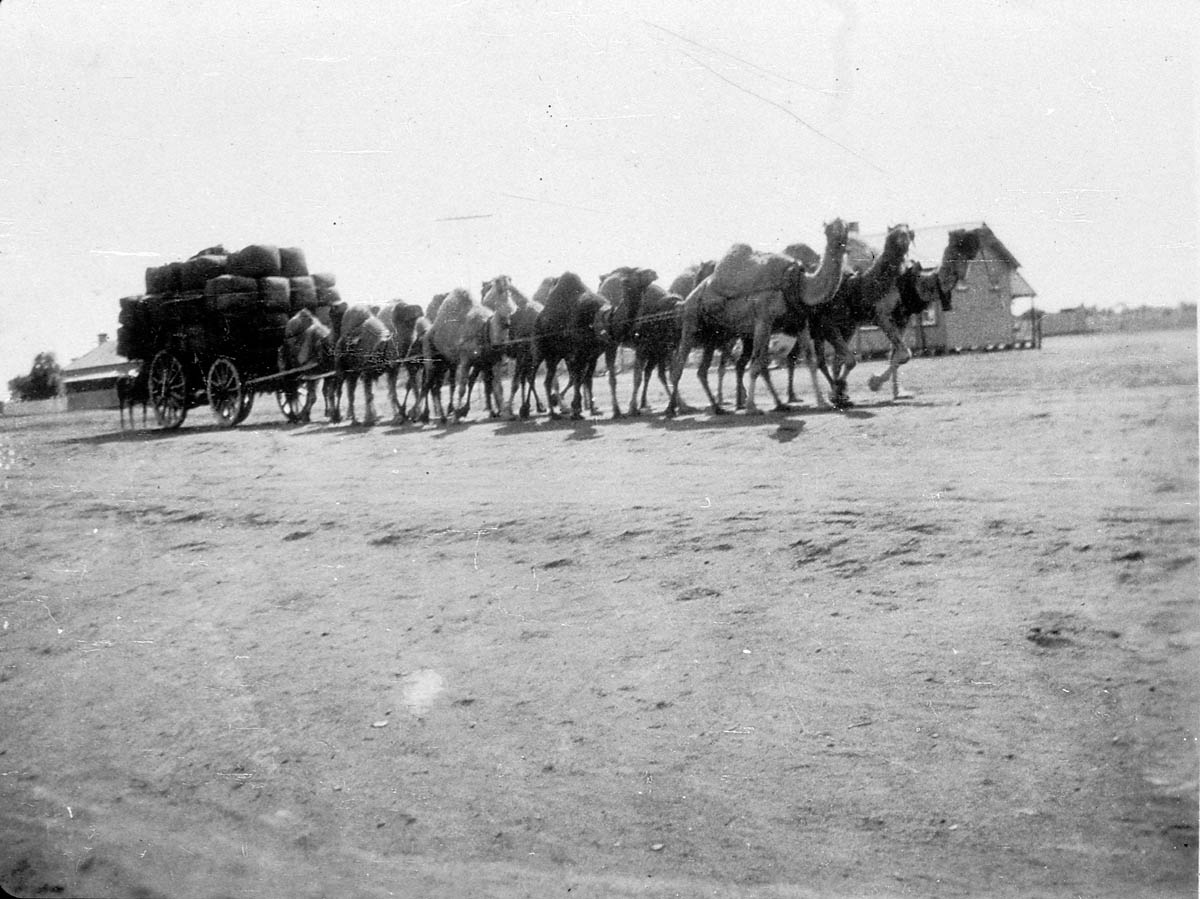
Bales of wool on a camel train at Ivanhoe, 24 September 1928

Ivanhoe was on the western boundary of the country of the Wangaibon Aboriginal people. In 1869, George Brown Williamson, the postmaster and storekeeper at Booligal, purchased 40 acres (16 hectares) from the "Waiko" pastoral run at the site, which was to become the township of Ivanhoe. Williamson selected the location as a business opportunity, being the at junction of the roads from Booligal and Balranald, leading to Wilcannia on the Darling River. Williamson began operating a branch store at the location under the charge of his employee Charles Hiller. Williamson was a native of Morayshire in Scotland, and is believed to have chosen the name "Ivanhoe", after the title of the historical novel by Walter Scott.

Initially, the nearest water supply to Ivanhoe was at Kilfera Lake, 25 kilometres away, from which the water had to be carted by dray. The Ivanhoe Hotel was built in 1871 and the licensee was James Eade, who remained publican until 1875 (apart from during 1873 when Joshua Smith held the license). A post office opened at Ivanhoe on 1 January 1874 at Williamson's store (renamed ‘The Post Office Store’), with Charles Hiller in charge, although Williamson was the designated postmaster. On 1 February 1876, after a ten-year stint at Booligal, George Williamson moved to Ivanhoe. In 1876, two new hotels opened at Ivanhoe: the Horse and Jockey (licensee, Duncan McGregor) and Mac's Ivanhoe Hotel (licensee, Henry Gayson). The licensee of the Ivanhoe Hotel in 1876 was Roberick MacKenzie. In 1879, a police presence was maintained at Ivanhoe to protect local residents from the Hatfield Bushrangers.

The Ivanhoe Hotel ceased operating after 1882, leaving two hotels in the township. During 1882, work commenced on the erection of a telegraph line from Booligal to Wilcannia. A telegraph station was opened at Ivanhoe on 5 February 1883 under the charge of Alfred Webber Rice, who had been promoted from his position at Campbelltown. The township was described in 1883 as having about 50 residents, a blacksmith's shop, two hotels, two stores (Williamson's and Stewart's), and "a few cottages".

By 1884, Ivanhoe was a major change-station for Cobb & Co's horses on the coach route to and from the Darling River. In 1884, businesses in the township included the Cobb & Co Chaff House and Millie's Stable and Yards (Henry Thomas Millie was the licensee of Mac's Ivanhoe Hotel at that time). Mounted police were established at Ivanhoe in 1885. The Ivanhoe Jockey Club held its first race meeting in May 1885. From 1887 until the late 1930s, race meetings were held twice a year on a course which formed part of the town common. In 1889, a school opened in the township. The summer heat was a significant problem for the school. Refrigerating paint and a veranda were used to ward off the sun but the school was closed during the extended drought from 1904 to 1907.

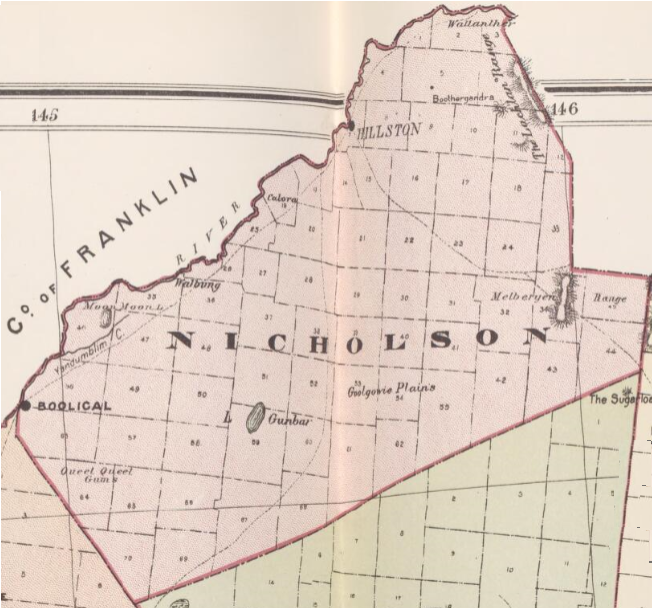
Nicholson County NSW as shown on an 1886 John Sands map

Ivanhoe was officially proclaimed a township in 1890. A new post office building was opened in January 1898. The building still stands adjacent to its original site, though it has been renovated in recent years.

The founder of Ivanhoe, George Williamson, died in 1907.

In 1925, Ivanhoe was linked by the Broken Hill railway line to Sydney, via Parkes. Two years later, the extension to Broken Hill was completed. The line through Ivanhoe later became part of the transcontinental east-west rail corridor connecting Sydney and Perth.

=== Ivanhoe Heritage Trail ===
The Ivanhoe Heritage Trail provides a good introduction to the town and its history. At separate sign-posted locations along the trail there are detailed descriptions of (1) the arrival of the railway (2) the Government Tank (3) the Post Office (4) bushrangers (5) watering holes (6) industrial trouble (7) the Cobb Highway and (8) reminiscences. With the exception of the railway station all sites are located within a block of the main street. A pamphlet with details of the heritage trail is available from the post office and other retail outlets; a book with more detailed information is also available for purchase.

== Climate ==
Ivanhoe has a hot semi-arid climate (BSh) under the Köppen climate classification, with very hot summers and relatively cool winters. Seasonal range is considerable: the average minimum / maximum temperature in January is 18.1 °C (64.6 °F) / 34.9 °C (94.8 °F), while in July is 3.6 °C (38.5 °F) / 16.5 °C (61.7 °F). The highest temperature recorded at Ivanhoe was 48.5 °C (119.3 °F) on 15 February 2004; the lowest recorded was −6.2 °C (20.8 °F) on 21 July 1982. The average annual rainfall is 306.0 millimetres (12.05 in) which is spread evenly on 52 days of the year, though winters tend to be somewhat rainier than summers.

Climate data for Ivanhoe Post Office (1939–2013, rainfall 1884–2016); 85 m AMSL; 32.90° S, 144.30° E
Month	Jan	Feb	Mar	Apr	May	Jun	Jul	Aug	Sep	Oct	Nov	Dec	Year
Record high °C (°F)	47.9 (118.2)	48.5 (119.3)	44.7 (112.5)	39.0 (102.2)	30.8 (87.4)	26.8 (80.2)	26.0 (78.8)	32.2 (90.0)	39.2 (102.6)	40.5 (104.9)	45.6 (114.1)	46.4 (115.5)	48.5 (119.3)
Mean daily maximum °C (°F)	34.9 (94.8)	34.0 (93.2)	30.7 (87.3)	25.7 (78.3)	20.4 (68.7)	17.1 (62.8)	16.5 (61.7)	18.7 (65.7)	22.7 (72.9)	26.4 (79.5)	30.0 (86.0)	33.3 (91.9)	25.9 (78.6)
Mean daily minimum °C (°F)	18.1 (64.6)	18.0 (64.4)	14.7 (58.5)	10.3 (50.5)	6.8 (44.2)	4.4 (39.9)	3.6 (38.5)	4.7 (40.5)	7.2 (45.0)	10.5 (50.9)	13.8 (56.8)	16.3 (61.3)	10.7 (51.3)
Record low °C (°F)	8.0 (46.4)	6.6 (43.9)	4.5 (40.1)	−0.5 (31.1)	−5.6 (21.9)	−5.6 (21.9)	−6.2 (20.8)	−4.0 (24.8)	−1.2 (29.8)	0.2 (32.4)	2.0 (35.6)	6.0 (42.8)	−6.2 (20.8)
Average rainfall mm (inches)	29.9 (1.18)	28.4 (1.12)	29.5 (1.16)	19.5 (0.77)	26.9 (1.06)	26.8 (1.06)	23.0 (0.91)	23.5 (0.93)	21.9 (0.86)	28.1 (1.11)	24.0 (0.94)	25.8 (1.02)	306.0 (12.05)
Average rainy days (≥ 0.2 mm)	3.3	3.1	3.3	3.2	4.8	5.9	5.9	5.7	4.8	4.8	3.6	3.6	52.0
Average afternoon relative humidity (%)	25	28	31	38	49	55	53	44	35	30	26	25	37
Source: Bureau of Meteorology, Ivanhoe Post Office (all years)

== Ivanhoe Health Service ==
Ivanhoe Health Service caters to the general Ivanhoe population, as well as to outlying sheep and cattle stations.

The health service is part of the New South Wales Far West Local Health District, and its staff consist of full-time registered nurses, Aboriginal health workers and support staff.

The health service provides a 24-hour accident and emergency service, and features a 4x4 ambulance. Patients requiring further treatment are evacuated to Broken Hill Health Service or other specialist healthcare providers throughout New South Wales, Victoria and South Australia, by a variety of healthcare services including the Royal Flying Doctor Service.

Medical services are provided twice a week by the Royal Flying Doctor Service with specialisations including ophthalmology, dental, child health, endocrinology, dermatology, and physiotherapy. Maari Ma Health Aboriginal Corporation also provides a chronic disease GP who visits the clinic every 6 weeks.

In 2012, the hospital was upgraded with a new emergency department which was built onto the existing structure. The total cost of the upgrade totalled $590,000. The upgrade included a two-bay treatment and resuscitation area and a new ambulance bay which connected to the hospital.

In December 2015, the hospital was further upgraded with the development of the Ivanhoe HealthOne facility, which is situated in front of the existing health facility and is connected to the 2012 emergency department. The cost of the new facility totalled $2.4 million. The upgrade included a new waiting area, administration offices, three treatment rooms, and featured four 'story poles' in front of the facility's entrance that were carved by inmates from the Ivanhoe Warakirri Correctional Centre.

== Ivanhoe Warakirri Centre ==
Ivanhoe Warakirri Centre was a minimum security correctional centre for male inmates, located at Ivanhoe. The Centre had accommodation for 55 prisoners, the majority of whom were Aboriginal. Inmates performed cleaning and maintenance tasks, as well as participating in community projects and the Mobile Outreach program. Inmates were supported to undertake education programs, including numeracy and literacy, self-awareness and alcohol and substance-abuse management programs.

The correctional centre was closed by the Berejiklian Government in June 2020. The facility and 26 houses were sold Tronox as staff accommodation for the Atlas/Campaspe titanium mine 10 km south of Arumpo. The mine, south west of Ivanhoe on the Balranald - Ivanhoe road, extracts mineralised sand. The heavy mineral concentrate from the mine (HMC) will be trucked to a new rail siding just outside of town, then transported to Broken Hill for further processing. The rail load-out facility (the Ivanhoe Rail Facility), is located 140 km north-east of the mine and 4.5 km south-west of Ivanhoe, in the Central Darling LGA. Ivanhoe will be an important logistics hub for Atlas-Campaspe, and there will be employment and business opportunities through their contractors during the construction and operational phases. By 2025, the mine operates off the grid with 12 MW diesel engines, 11 MW solar power, and a 6 megawatt-hour (MWh) / 3 MW battery.

== Sports teams ==
The township of Ivanhoe is represented by rugby league team the Ivanhoe Roosters who play in the Group 17 Rugby League competition.

== Railway ==
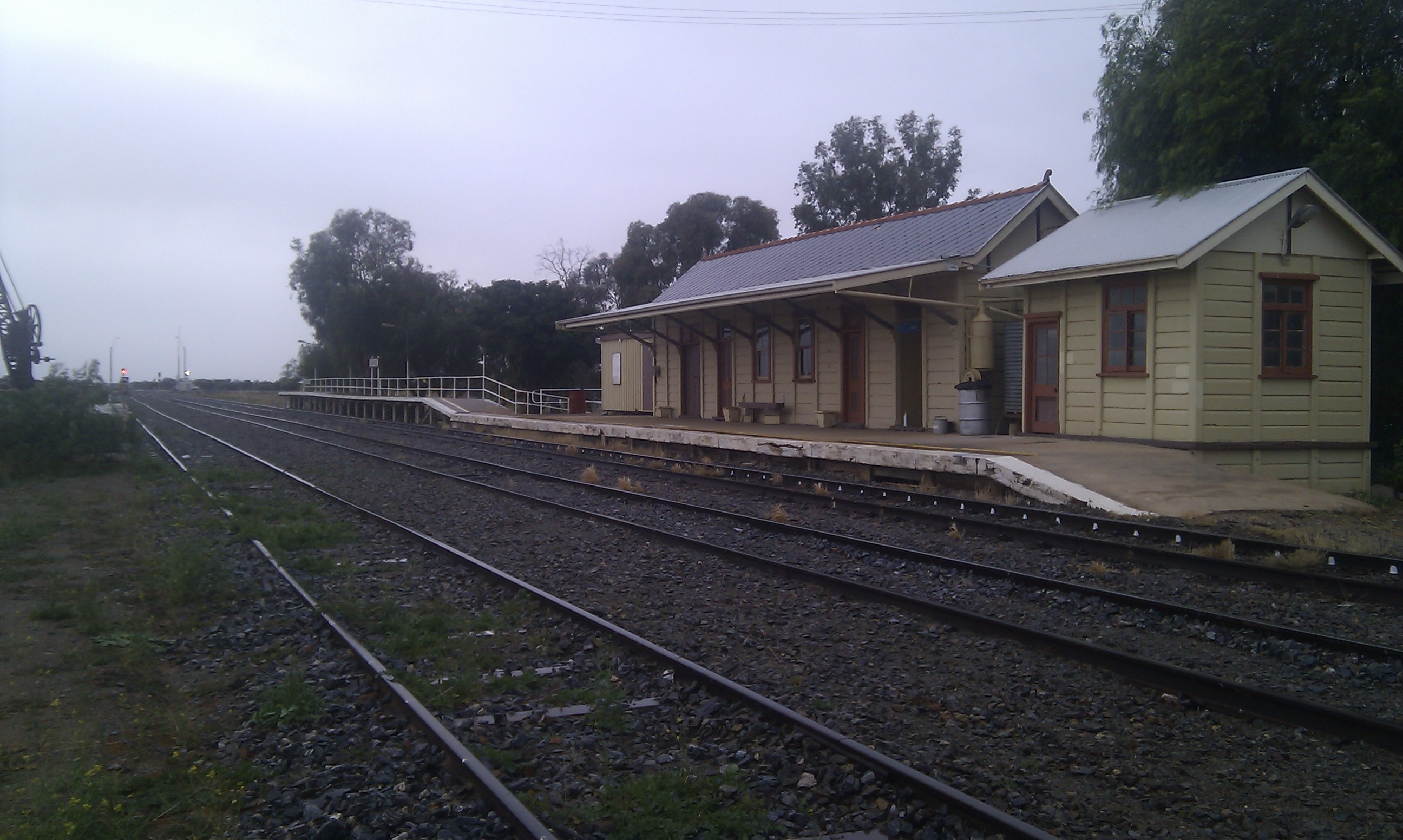
Ivanhoe station, 2011

Ivanhoe railway station opened on 19 August 1925, and is located on the Broken Hill railway line. The station is now unattended but it is still served by NSW TrainLink's Outback Xplorer on Mondays to Broken Hill) and on Tuesdays heading to Sydney). The Indian Pacific train to Sydney on passes through Tuesdays, and to Adelaide and Perth on Thursdays, but does not stop.

The main town is located approximately three kilometres north of the railway station and, from the opening of the line, a separate suburb was constructed by the railways department, adjacent the station. The locality was generally referred to as Rail Town. Workshops, worker houses, locomotive depots, track maintenance depot, crew barracks, fuelling point and the station were all located there. Twenty-three new houses were built as recently as 1979 by the NSW Housing Commission. Rail Town has now largely been taken over by the Ivanhoe (Warakirri) Correctional Centre.

Ivanhoe remains a train crossing location where two trains can pass one another on a 1,850-metre-long passing loop, 816 rail kilometres from Sydney. Ivanhoe crossing loop is between other crossing locations at Trida (65 km to the east) and Darnick (64 km to the west).

== Road routes ==
Ivanhoe is located on the Cobb Highway, National Route 75, which runs generally north–south between Moama and Wilcannia. Ivanhoe is 182 km from Wilcannia to the north and 210 km from Hay to the south. There is a local road from Ivanhoe to Menindee, 205 km in length; this road is a gravel, dry-weather only road. The Cobb Highway is almost a fully tarred road, with only 15 km of dirt road remaining just north of Mount Manara, which is about 60 km north of Ivanhoe. The Cobb Highway between Ivanhoe and Wilcannia is a far better road than the Cobb Highway south of Ivanhoe. In November 2022 major flooding just south of Mossgiel closed the Cobb Highway for weeks; the only open road into Ivanhoe was via the Balranald road, with minor flooding around the Killfera farm.
