= Cobar Shire =

- Local government area
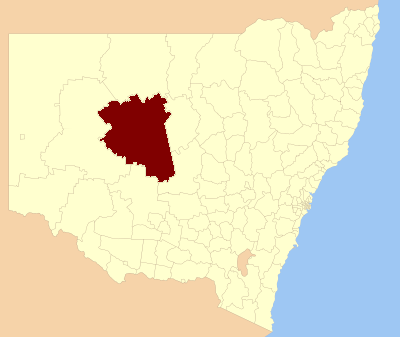
- Location in New South Wales

- Interactive map of Cobar Shire
- Coordinates: 31°29′54″S 145°40′04″E
- Country: Australia
- State: New South Wales
- Region: Orana
- Established: 18 March 1884
- Council seat: Cobar

Government
  - Mayor: Peter Abbott (Independent)
  - State electorate: Barwon
  - Federal division: Parkes

Area
  - Total: 44,065 km^{2} (17,014 sq mi)

Population
  - Totals: 4,059 (2021 census); 4,015 (2024 est.)
  - Density: 0.092114/km^{2} (0.23857/sq mi)
- Website: Cobar Shire
LGAs around Cobar Shire
Central Darling	Bourke	Brewarrina
Central Darling	Cobar Shire	Bogan
Central Darling	Carrathool	Lachlan

Cobar Shire is a local government area in the Orana region of New South Wales, Australia. The Shire is located in an outback area that is centred around the mining town of Cobar. The Shire is traversed by the Barrier Highway and the Kidman Way. With a total area of 44,065 square kilometres (17,014 sq mi), about two-thirds the size of Tasmania, Cobar Shire is larger than Denmark and 99 other countries and self-governing territories, but its population is under 5,000.

Lilliane Brady OAM was the mayor of Cobar Shire for more than 20 years, before her death in 2021. At the time of her death, she was the longest-serving female mayor in New South Wales' history.

The current mayor of Cobar Shire Council is Peter Abbott, an independent politician.

== Villages and localities ==
The shire also includes several small outback towns and localities; the twin villages of Euabalong and Euabalong West in the far south east of the shire, Canbelego, Mount Hope, Murrin Bridge, Nymagee and Irymple.

== Demographics ==
According to the Australian Bureau of Statistics during 2003–04 there:

- were 1,898 wage and salary earners (ranked 116th in New South Wales and 376th in Australia, less than 0.1% of both New South Wales's 2,558,415 and Australia's 7,831,856)
- was a total income of $79 million (ranked 108th in New South Wales and 359th in Australia, less than 0.1% of both New South Wales's $107 billion and Australia's $304 billion)
- was an estimated average income per wage and salary earner of $41,386 (ranked 27th in New South Wales and 85th in Australia, 100% of New South Wales's $41,407 and 107% of Australia's $38,820)
- was an estimated median income per wage and salary earner of $36,856 (ranked 27th in New South Wales and 81st in Australia, 104% of New South Wales's $35,479 and 108% of Australia's $34,149).

Selected historical census data for Cobar Shire local government area
Census year		2011	2016
Population	Estimated residents on census night	4,710	▼4,647
Population	LGA rank in terms of size within New South Wales	114th	▲113th
Population	% of New South Wales population		
Population	% of Australian population		
Cultural and language diversity			
Ancestry, top responses	English		
Ancestry, top responses	Australian		
Ancestry, top responses	Italian		
Ancestry, top responses	Chinese		
Ancestry, top responses	Irish		
Language, top responses (other than English)	Italian		
Language, top responses (other than English)	Mandarin		
Language, top responses (other than English)	Cantonese		
Language, top responses (other than English)	Korean		
Language, top responses (other than English)	Greek		
Religious affiliation			
Religious affiliation, top responses	Catholic		
Religious affiliation, top responses	No religion		
Religious affiliation, top responses	Anglican		
Religious affiliation, top responses	Eastern Orthodox		
Religious affiliation, top responses	Buddhism		
Median weekly incomes			
Personal income	Median weekly personal income	A$	
Personal income	% of Australian median income		
Family income	Median weekly family income		
Family income	% of Australian median income		
Household income	Median weekly household income		
Household income	% of Australian median income		

== Council ==
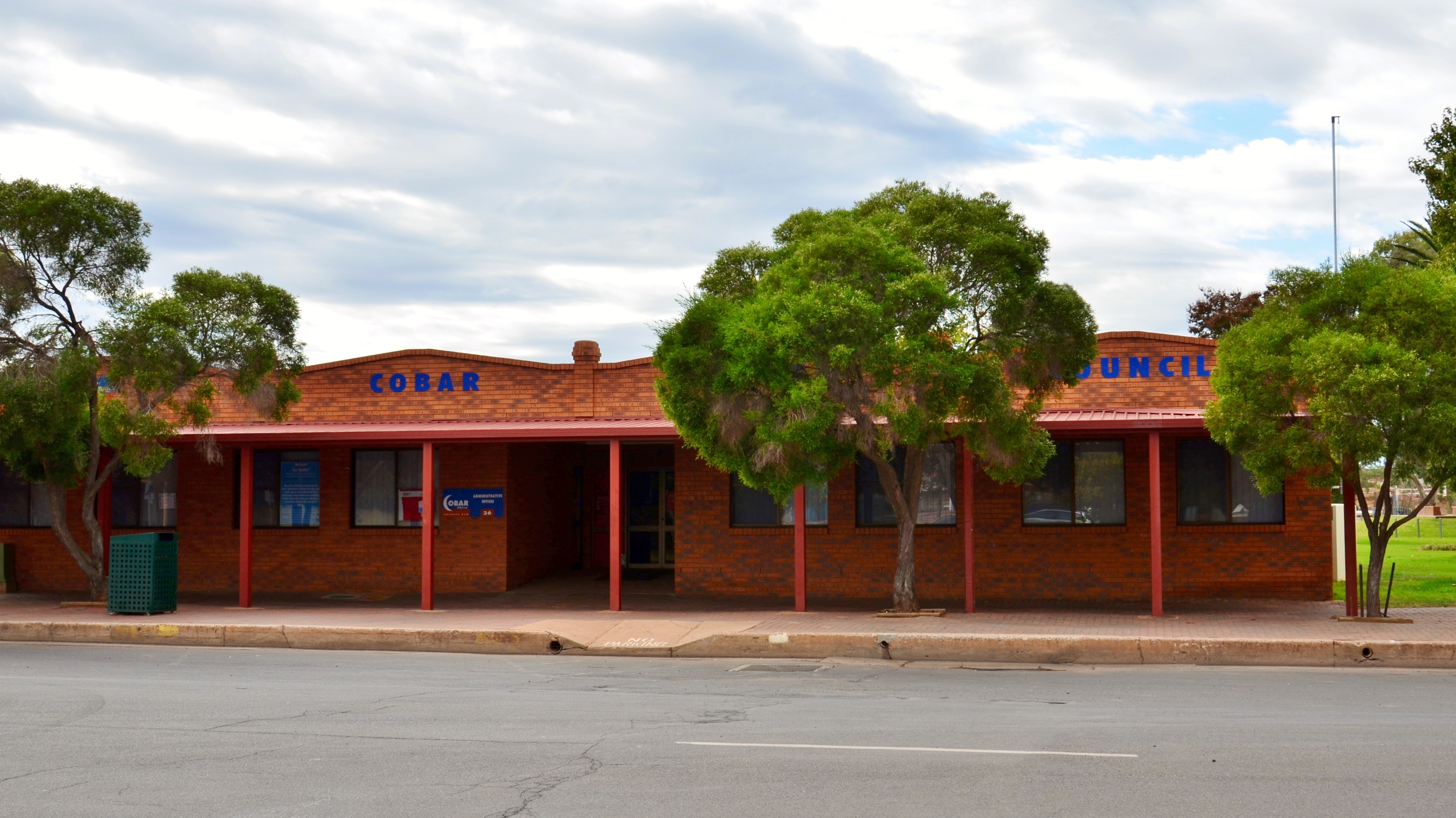
Cobar Shire's administration office in 2017

=== Current composition and election method ===
Cobar Shire Council is composed of 12 councillors elected proportionally to a single ward. All councillors are elected for a fixed four-year term of office. The mayor is elected by the councillors at the first meeting of the council. The most recent election was held on 4 December 2021. Only eleven candidates nominated for election, and with there being no additional candidates, the election was uncontested. A by-election was held on 26 February 2022 for the remaining seat. The makeup of the council is as follows:

Party	Councillors
Independents and Unaligned	12
Total	12

The current Council, elected in 2021, in order of election, is:

Councillor	Party	Notes
Peter Abbott	Independent	Mayor
Tony Chaplain	Independent	
Janine Lea-Barrett	Independent	
Jarrod Marsden	Independent	Deputy Mayor
Peter Maxwell	Independent	
Kain Neale	Independent	
Julie Payne	Independent	
Lillian Simpson	Unaligned	
Bob Sinclair	Unaligned	
Harley Toomey	Independent	
Kate Winders	Independent	
Michael Prince	Independent	Elected at the 26 February 2022 by-election

== Election results ==
=== 2024 ===
2024 New South Wales local elections: Cobar
Party	Candidate	Votes	%	±%
Independent	Jarrod Marsden (elected)	unopposed		
Independent	Miranda Fry (elected)	unopposed		
Independent	Bob Sinclair (elected)	unopposed		
Independent	Lillian Simpson (elected)	unopposed		
Independent	Peter Florance (elected)	unopposed		
Independent	Michael Prince (elected)	unopposed		
Independent	Harley Toomey (elected)	unopposed		
Independent	Michael Haines (elected)	unopposed		
Independent	Kate Winders (elected)	unopposed		
Independent	Chris Deighton (elected)	unopposed		
Independent	Nigel Vagg (elected)	unopposed		
Independent Liberal	Wayne Phillips (elected)	unopposed		
Registered electors				

=== 2022 by-election ===
2022 Cobar Shire Council by-election: 26 February 2022
Party	Candidate	Votes	%	±%
Independent	Michael Prince (elected)	1,537	77.28	+77.28
Independent	Jesse Cochrane Adolfson	452	22.72	+22.72
Total formal votes		1,989	98.42	
Informal votes		32	1.58	
Turnout		2,021	80.0	
Independent hold		Swing		

- By-election held to fill the remaining 12th seat, which was not filled at the 2021 election

=== 2021 ===
2021 New South Wales local elections: Cobar
Party	Candidate	Votes	%	±%
Independent	Peter Abbott (elected)	unopposed		
Independent	Tony Chaplain (elected)	unopposed		
Independent	Janine Lea-Barrett (elected)	unopposed		
Independent	Jarrod Marsden (elected)	unopposed		
Independent	Peter Maxwell (elected)	unopposed		
Independent	Kain Neale (elected)	unopposed		
Independent	Julie Payne (elected)	unopposed		
Independent	Lillian Simpson (elected)	unopposed		
Independent	Bob Sinclair (elected)	unopposed		
Independent	Harley Toomey (elected)	unopposed		
Independent	Kate Winders (elected)	unopposed		
Registered electors		2,829		
