= Munro Parish, New South Wales =

Locality in Australia

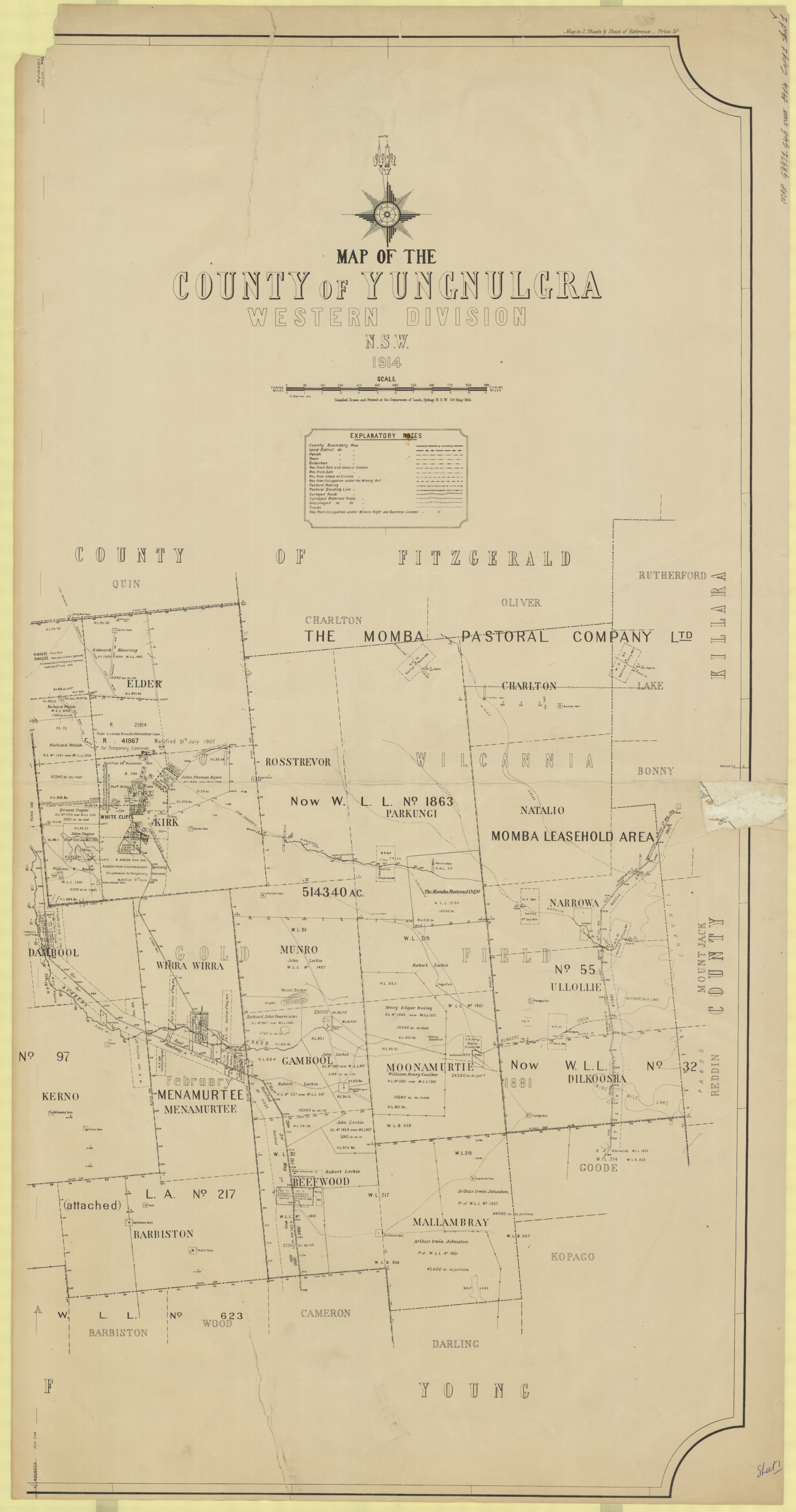
Yungnulgra County parish map (1914)

Munro Parish, New South Wales located at 30°59′34″S 143°13′26″E in Central Darling Shire is a remote rural locality and civil parish of Yungnulgra County in far North West New South Wales.

== Geography ==
The Parish an arid landscape. The nearest town is Whitecliffs 2 km away.

== History ==
The Parish is on the traditional lands of the Wandjiwalgu. Aboriginal peoples.

In 1838 Thomas Mitchell (explorer) travelled down the nearby Darling River. Charles Sturt passed through the Wandjiwalgu lands during 1845, In 1861 the Burke and Wills expedition passed nearby.

== Climate ==
The parish has extremely hot summers and mild winters. Summers would usually exceed 36 °C. Winters are usually around 17 °C. The annual average rainfall is 249.7 millimetres (9.8 in) which would make it a semi-arid climate except that its high evapotranspiration, or its aridity, makes it a desert climate. The parish has a Köppen climate classification of BWh (Hot desert),. is almost unpopulated, with less than two inhabitants per square kilometre.

Climate data for White Cliffs Post Office (1901-2012)
Month	Jan	Feb	Mar	Apr	May	Jun	Jul	Aug	Sep	Oct	Nov	Dec	Year
Record high °C (°F)	48.6 (119.5)	46.9 (116.4)	44.1 (111.4)	37.9 (100.2)	31.9 (89.4)	28.0 (82.4)	28.8 (83.8)	33.0 (91.4)	39.5 (103.1)	41.7 (107.1)	45.0 (113.0)	45.8 (114.4)	48.6 (119.5)
Mean daily maximum °C (°F)	35.8 (96.4)	34.9 (94.8)	31.6 (88.9)	26.4 (79.5)	21.4 (70.5)	17.6 (63.7)	17.2 (63.0)	19.7 (67.5)	23.9 (75.0)	27.9 (82.2)	31.5 (88.7)	34.4 (93.9)	26.9 (80.4)
Mean daily minimum °C (°F)	20.9 (69.6)	20.4 (68.7)	17.2 (63.0)	12.4 (54.3)	8.2 (46.8)	5.3 (41.5)	4.1 (39.4)	5.6 (42.1)	9.0 (48.2)	12.9 (55.2)	16.4 (61.5)	19.2 (66.6)	12.6 (54.7)
Record low °C (°F)	12.1 (53.8)	8.8 (47.8)	7.2 (45.0)	2.6 (36.7)	−0.5 (31.1)	−2.3 (27.9)	−3.3 (26.1)	−1.7 (28.9)	0.2 (32.4)	2.0 (35.6)	3.4 (38.1)	6.8 (44.2)	−3.3 (26.1)
Average precipitation mm (inches)	27.7 (1.09)	27.1 (1.07)	23.8 (0.94)	15.4 (0.61)	20.8 (0.82)	19.0 (0.75)	18.2 (0.72)	15.4 (0.61)	15.0 (0.59)	23.2 (0.91)	19.2 (0.76)	25.1 (0.99)	249.7 (9.83)
Average precipitation days	3.0	2.8	2.5	2.2	3.4	3.7	3.8	3.4	3.0	3.6	3.1	3.0	37.5
