= Menamurtee, New South Wales =

City

Menamurtee located at 31°04′22″S 143°10′00″E, south of White Cliffs, New South Wales in Central Darling Shire is a remote rural locality and civil parish of Yungnulgra County in far North West New South Wales.

== Geography ==
The Parish has an arid landscape. The nearest town is Whitecliffs a few kilometres to the north.

== Climate ==
The parish has extremely hot summers and mild winters. Summers would usually exceed 36 °C. Winters are usually around 17 °C. The annual average rainfall is 249.7 millimetres (9.8 in) which would make it a semi-arid climate except that its high evapotranspiration, or its aridity, makes it a desert climate. The parish has a Köppen climate classification of BWh (Hot desert),. is almost unpopulated, with less than two inhabitants per square kilometre.

== History ==
The Parish is on the traditional lands of the Wandjiwalgu, Aboriginal peoples.

In 1838 Thomas Mitchell (explorer) travelled down the nearby Darling River. Charles Sturt passed through the Wandjiwalgu lands during 1845, In 1861 the Burke and Wills expedition passed nearby.

Opal was discovered in the area in the late]] 19th century.
