= Yungnulgra County =

Yungnulgra New South Wales
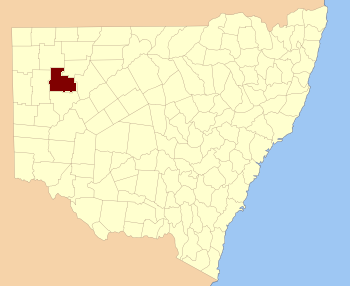
- Location in New South Wales
Lands administrative divisions around Yungnulgra:
Yantara	Yantara	Fitzgerald
Mootwingee	Yungnulgra	Killara
Mootwingee	Young	Killara

Yungnulgra County is one of the 141 cadastral divisions of New South Wales.

The name Yungnulgra is believed to be derived from a local Aboriginal word and is also the name used for Yungnulgra Plains.

== Parishes within this county ==
A full list of parishes found within this county; their current LGA and mapping coordinates to the approximate centre of each location is as follows:

Parish	LGA	Coordinates
Beefwood	Central Darling Shire	31°08′44″S 143°13′23″E
Cootawundy	Central Darling Shire	31°09′40″S 142°42′45″E
Cope	Central Darling Shire	30°47′04″S 142°49′25″E
Dawes	Central Darling Shire	31°10′31″S 142°47′53″E
Dilkoosha	Central Darling Shire	31°05′40″S 143°27′09″E
Elder	Central Darling Shire	30°43′10″S 143°06′00″E
Ernoo	Central Darling Shire	30°32′51″S 142°56′15″E
Gambool	Central Darling Shire	31°05′15″S 143°13′25″E
Germano	Central Darling Shire	31°03′44″S 142°49′28″E
Gnalta	Unincorporated Far West Region	31°11′05″S 142°37′36″E
Goorpooka	Central Darling Shire	30°44′30″S 143°46′36″E
Kandie	Unincorporated Far West Region	30°49′15″S 142°36′55″E
Kerndombie	Central Darling Shire	30°57′19″S 142°49′25″E
Kerno	Central Darling Shire	31°02′27″S 142°59′34″E
Kirk	Central Darling Shire	30°50′10″S 143°06′01″E
Mallambray	Central Darling Shire	31°15′52″S 143°20′21″E
Menamurtee	Central Darling Shire	31°04′22″S 143°10′00″E
Moonamurtie	Central Darling Shire	31°05′40″S 143°20′23″E
Munro	Central Darling Shire	30°59′34″S 143°13′26″E
Nulla Nulla	Unincorporated Far West Region	30°49′24″S 142°32′00″E
Pampara	Unincorporated Far West Region	31°03′18″S 142°29′59″E
Parkungi	Central Darling Shire	30°56′53″S 143°22′02″E
Pulchra	Unincorporated Far West Region	30°29′56″S 142°45′54″E
Quamby	Unincorporated Far West Region	30°25′45″S 142°45′52″E
Rosstrevor	Central Darling Shire	30°52′08″S 143°14′45″E
Rutherford	Central Darling Shire	30°41′18″S 143°32′01″E
Tully	Central Darling Shire	30°36′35″S 142°52′52″E
Ullollie	Central Darling Shire	31°03′02″S 143°27′09″E
Walker	Central Darling Shire	31°09′26″S 142°52′33″E
Walla	Unincorporated Far West Region	30°41′11″S 142°41′19″E
Wertago	Unincorporated Far West Region	30°53′43″S 142°41′03″E
Willdrilli	Unincorporated Far West Region	30°38′00″S 142°33′13″E
Williams	Unincorporated Far West Region	30°44′59″S 142°41′53″E
Wirra Wirra	Central Darling Shire	31°01′25″S 143°07′19″E
Woraro	Unincorporated Far West Region	30°58′01″S 142°30′22″E
Yancannia	Unincorporated Far West Region	30°21′02″S 142°35′09″E
Yeiltara	Unincorporated Far West Region	30°29′59″S 142°35′07″E
Yerndambool	Central Darling Shire	30°58′05″S 142°59′33″E
Yowahroo	Central Darling Shire	30°45′10″S 142°57′11″E
