= Cope (Parish), New South Wales =

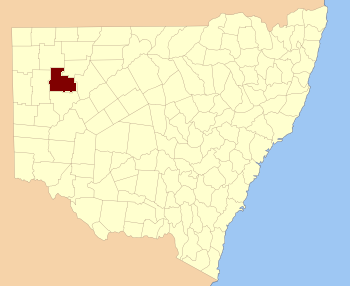
Yungnulgra County, NSW.

Cope Parish, New South Wales in Central Darling Shire is a remote rural locality and civil parish of Yungnulgra County in far North West New South Wales. The nearest town is Whitecliffs.

== Climate ==
The Parish has an arid landscape, with extremely hot summers and mild winters. Summers would usually exceed 36 °C. Winters are usually around 17 °C. The annual average rainfall is about 249.7 millimetres (9.8 in) which would make it a semi-arid climate except that its high evapotranspiration, or its aridity, makes it a desert climate. The parish has a Köppen climate classification of BWh (Hot desert),. is almost unpopulated, with fewer than two inhabitants per square kilometre.
