= Gnalta, New South Wales =

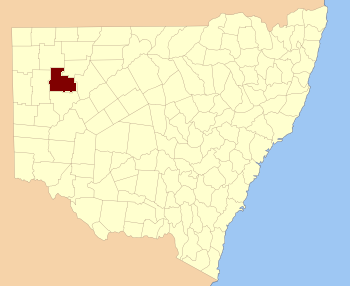
Yungnulgra County NSW.

Gnalta is a remote rural locality and civil parish of Yungnulgra County in far North West New South Wales.

Gnalta Station is a homestead on the Mount Wright Creek in northwest New South Wales, about 550 km northeast of Adelaide, South Australia and 890 km northwest of Sydney, Australia.

== History ==
Silicified trilobites fossils from the early middle Cambrian have been found at Gnalta.

The Parish is on the traditional lands of the Wandjiwalgu. Aboriginal peoples.

The station was at one time owned by Goldsbrough Mort and Company.

== Geography ==
Gnalta is about 183m above sea level. although Gnalta Peak reaches about 270m above sea level. The Parish has an arid landscape. and the nearest town is Whitecliffs.

The parish has extremely hot summers and mild winters. Summers would usually exceed 36 °C. Winters are usually around 17°C. The annual average rainfall is 249.7 millimetres (9.8 in) which would make it a semi-arid climate except that its high evapotranspiration, or its aridity, makes it a desert climate. The parish has a Köppen climate classification of BWh (Hot desert),. is almost unpopulated, with less than two inhabitants per square kilometre.

The nearest town is the village of White Cliffs, New South Wales.
