= Yowahroo, New South Wales =

Australian rural settlement

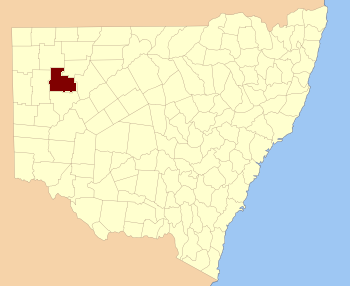
Yungnulgra County, NSW.

Yowahroo Parish, New South Wales in Central Darling Shire is a remote rural locality and civil parish of Yungnulgra County in far northwest New South Wales, Australia.

The nearest town is Whitecliffs. The parish has an arid landscape, extremely hot summers and mild winters. The annual average rainfall is about 249.7 millimetres (9.8 in) which would make it a semi-arid climate except that its high evapotranspiration, or its aridity, makes it a desert climate. The parish has a Köppen climate classification of BWh (Hot desert), is almost unpopulated, with less than two inhabitants per square kilometre.
