= Kerndombie, New South Wales =

Rural locality and civil parish in New South Wales, Australia

Kerndombie is a remote rural locality and civil parish of Yungnulgra County in far North West New South Wales.

== Geography ==
Kerndombie located at 30°57′19″S 142°49′25″E is between Mutawintji National Park and the nearest town, Whitecliffs to the south east. The Parish has an arid landscape.

== Climate ==
The parish has extremely hot summers and mild winters. Summers would usually exceed 36 °C. Winters are usually around 17 °C. The annual average rainfall is 249.7 millimetres (9.8 in) which would make it a semi-arid climate except that its high evapotranspiration, or its aridity, makes it a desert climate. The parish has a Köppen climate classification of BWh (Hot desert),. is almost unpopulated, with less than two inhabitants per square kilometre.
