= Pulchra, New South Wales =

Pulchra is a remote rural locality and civil parish of Yungnulgra County in far North West New South Wales.

The Parish has an arid landscape and the nearest town is Whitecliffs. Pulchra has extremely hot summers and mild winters. Summers would usually exceed 36 °C. Winters are usually around 17 °C. The annual average rainfall is 249.7 millimetres (9.8 in) which would make it a semi-arid climate except that its high evapotranspiration, or its aridity, makes it a desert climate. The parish has a Köppen climate classification of BWh (Hot desert),. is almost unpopulated, with less than two inhabitants per square kilometre.

The parish is halfway between Mutawintji National Park and White Cliffs NSW, and Sydney, Australia is 880 km away to the east-southeast of Pulchra. Pulchra is at an elevation of approximately 163m above sea level.
