= Cootawundy, New South Wales =

Rural locality in New South Wales, Australia

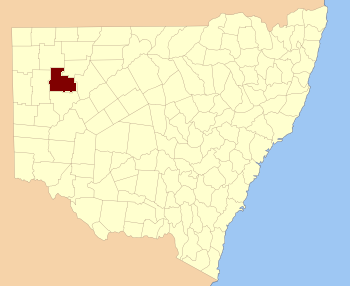
Yungnulgra County, NSW.

Cootawundy in Central Darling Shire is a remote rural locality and civil parish of Yungnulgra County in far North West New South Wales.

The Parish has an arid landscape, with extremely hot summers and mild winters. Summers would usually exceed 36 °C, and winters around 17 °C. The annual average rainfall is 249.7 millimetres (9.8 in) which would make it a semi-arid climate except that its high evapotranspiration, or its aridity, makes it a desert climate. The parish has a Köppen climate classification of BWh (Hot desert). is almost unpopulated, with fewer than two inhabitants per square kilometre.

The nearest town to Cootawundy is Whitecliffs.
