= Ernoo, New South Wales =

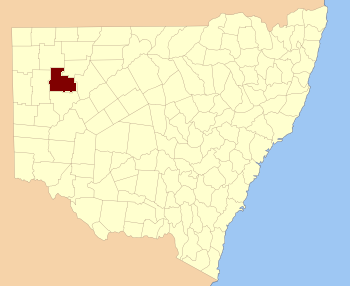
Yungnulgra County, NSW.

Ernoo Parish in Central Darling Shire is a remote rural locality and civil parish of Yungnulgra County in far North West New South Wales, Australia.

The Parish has an arid landscape and the nearest town is Whitecliffs.

The parish also has extremely hot summers and mild winters. Summers would usually exceed 36 °C. Winters are usually around 17 °C. The annual average rainfall is about249.7 millimetres (9.8 in) which would make it a semi-arid climate except that its high evapotranspiration, or its aridity, makes it a desert climate. The parish has a Köppen climate classification of BWh (Hot desert),. is almost unpopulated, with fewer than two inhabitants per square kilometre.
