= Tully (Parish), New South Wales =

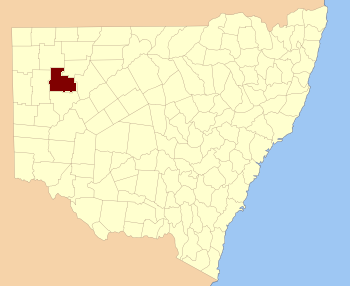
Yungnulgra County, NSW.

Tully Parish, New South Wales in Central Darling Shire is a remote rural locality and civil parish of Yungnulgra County in far North West New South Wales.

The Parish has an arid landscape and the nearest town is Whitecliffs. The parish has extremely hot summers and mild winters. The annual average rainfall is about 249.7 millimetres (9.8 in) which would make it a semi-arid climate except that its high evapotranspiration, or its aridity, makes it a desert climate. The parish has a Köppen climate classification of BWh (Hot desert),. is almost unpopulated, with less than two inhabitants per square kilometre.
