= Koonburra Creek =

Stream in Far Western, New South Wales, Australia

Coordinates: 31°14′50″S 142°36′35″E

Koonburra Creek is a stream in Far Western New South Wales, Australia.

The stream is between Broken Hill and White Cliffs, where the terrain is mostly a flat, arid landscape. The area is largely unpopulated, with habitation density less than 2 people per square kilometer.

Koonburra Creek starts below Mount Daubeny at an elevation of 224 metres (735 ft) and drops around 29.5 metres (97 ft) over its 9.8-kilometre (6.1 mi) length, finishing at an elevation of 195 metres (640 ft).
