= Wertago, New South Wales =

Wertago, New South Wales is a remote rural locality, station and civil parish of Yungnulgra County in far North West New South Wales.

== Location ==
Sydney, Australia is about 880 km to the east-southeast and the village of White Cliffs which is 56 km away. Wertago is about 216m above sea level. The nearest ocean being the Southern Ocean about 470 km west-southwest of Wertago.

Wertago has extremely hot summers and mild winters. The annual average rainfall is 249.7 millimetres (9.8 in) which would make it a semi-arid climate except that its high evapotranspiration, or its aridity, makes it a desert climate. The parish has a Köppen climate classification of BWh (Hot desert),. is almost unpopulated, with less than two inhabitants per square kilometre.

Big Wertago Mine is a copper, lead and silver mine on the Cootawundy Creek about 870 km west-northwest of Sydney. The Big Wertago Mine is at an altitude of about 272m above sea level and is one of the westernmost mines in New South Wales.

The Mutawintji National Park lies some kilometres to the west.
