= 2025 Central Darling Shire election =

- 20 September 2025

3 of the 6 seats on Central Darling Shire Council (Note: Central Darling Shire Council will assume the structure of a Rural and Remote Council following the election. This structure consists of 3 elected members and 3 members appointed by the NSW Government.) 4 seats needed for a majority
- Turnout: 484
	First party	Second party	Third party
	IND	IND	IND
Party	Independents	Ind. National	Ind. Indigenous
Last election	9 seats	Did not contest	Did not contest
Seats before	0	0	0
Seats won	2	1	0
Seat change	▲2	▲1	Steady
Primary vote	372	63	56
Percentage	79.0%	13.4%	11.9%
Largest elected group before election
In administration
Largest elected group after election
Independents

The 2025 Central Darling Shire election was held on 20 September 2025 to elect the three elected members of Central Darling Shire Council, a local government area (LGA) in the Far West region of New South Wales.

The election was the first in over a decade after the council was placed into administration in 2014. The council has been reorganised to a "Regional and Remote Council" structure in which half the council is elected and the other half is appointed by the New South Wales Government.

== Background ==
=== Administration ===
Central Darling Shire was placed into administration in 2014 following numerous structural and financial issues.

The LGA was planned to come out of administration at the 2020 local elections (which were delayed until 2021 due to the COVID-19 pandemic), however the administration period was extended in 2019 by another 4 years.

Bob Stewart served as administrator for 6 years and told the ABC that the council "lacked the governance processes, the systems [and] the financial capacity. We had to rebuild all that." Lack of inclusion of indigenous people in council planning was also flagged by him as a significant issue.

=== Regional and Remote Council structure ===
The Local Government Amendment (Rural and Remote Councils) Act 2024, which amended the Local Government Act 1993, was passed by the New South Wales Parliament on 19 September 2024 and assented to on the 30th.

This amendment created the Rural and Remote Council structure, which are composed of a mix of councillors elected by the citizens of the LGA and councillors appointed by the Minister for Local Government. These appointed councillors must have experience in local government administration, financial management, emergency management and governance, conservation, environmental sustainability and climate change adaption, and be able to represent the interests of the local Aboriginal population.

The Minister is also responsible for appointing one of the appointed councillors as Chairperson of council, a role filled by the Mayor in other New South Wales LGAs. The office of Deputy Chairperson is elected by the council, in much the same way that Deputy Mayors are elected across the rest of the state.

=== Election ===
On 18 June 2025, the New South Wales Office of Local Government announced an election date of 20 September alongside a $6 Million investment into the LGA over two years.

== Wards ==
The new council is composed of three single-member wards.

A Ward	B Ward	C Ward
Wilcannia; Outlying rural electors north and east of Menindee	Ivanhoe; Tilpa; White Cliffs; Mossgiel	Menindee; Sunset Strip

== Key dates ==
- Issue of writ –
- Close of roll – 11 August 2025; 6pm
- Nominations open – 11 August 2025
- Postal vote applications open – 12 August 2025
- Nominations close – 20 August 2025; 12 noon
- Nominations declared – 21 August 2025
- Pre-poll voting opens – 15 September 2025
- Postal vote applications close – 15 September 2025
- Election day – 20 September 2025; 8am – 6pm
- Postal vote returns close – 10 October 2025; 6pm
- Distribution of Preferences – 13 October 2025
- Declaration of results – 14 October 2025

== Candidates ==
=== A Ward candidates ===
Party	Candidate	Notes
Independent Indigenous-Aboriginal	Owen Douglas Whyman	Founder and Convenor of the Indigenous-Aboriginal Party of Australia. Lead Senate candidate in NSW at the 2022 federal elections and state candidate for Barwon in 2019.
Independent	Aunty Monica Jean Kerwin	Barkandji woman and resident of The Mallee, Wilcannia.
Independent	Rhonda Lee Hynch	Chairperson of the Wilcannia Community Working Party and Chair of the Baaka Cultural Centre.
Independent	Peter Geoffrey Sullivan	Former Councillor and final Deputy Mayor before the council was placed into administration.

=== B Ward candidates ===
Party	Candidate	Notes
Independent National	Maxwell James Bradley	Ivanhoe resident. Member of the National Party.
Unaligned	Robert Alister Vagg OAM	Non-residential registered in Ivanhoe. Former councillor of more than 30 years.
Independent	Sacha-Rachelle Sullivan	White Cliffs resident. International Business Owner & Operator.
Independent	Fay Elizabeth Johnstone	Ngiyampaa - Baarkintji woman and resident of Ivanhoe. Aboriginal Education Assistant at Invahoe Central School, Member of the Ivanhoe Health Advisory Council, and Board member of the Mount Grenfell Historic Site Management Committee. Former Director of the Murdi Paaki Regional Housing Board and the Western Aboriginal Legal Service.
Independent	Peter Francis Crawford	White Cliffs resident and handyman.

=== C Ward candidates ===
Party	Candidate	Notes
Independent	Daniel John Fusi	Menindee resident and teacher at Menindee Central School.

== Results ==
=== Central Darling results ===
Ward	Elected councillor	Party
A	Peter Sullivan	Independent
B	Max Bradley	Independent National
C	Daniel Fusi	Independent

2025 Central Darling Shire election
Party	Votes	%	Swing	Seats	Change
Independents	372	79.0		2	▲2
Independent National	63	13.4	+13.4	1	▲1
Independent Indigenous-Aboriginal	56	11.9	+11.9	0	Steady
Total formal votes	471	97.3			
Informal votes	13	2.7			
Turnout	484				
Registered voters					

=== A Ward ===
2025 Central Darling Shire election:A Ward
Party	Candidate	Votes	%	±%
Ind. Indigenous-Aboriginal	Owen Whyman	56	27.5	
Independent	Monica Kerwin	44	21.6	
Independent	Rhonda Hynch	30	14.7	
Independent	Peter Sullivan	74	36.3	
Total formal votes		204	97.1	
Informal votes		6	2.9	
Turnout		210		
Two-candidate-preferred result
Independent	Peter Sullivan	91	51.1	
Ind. Indigenous-Aboriginal	Owen Whyman	87	48.9	
Peter Sullivan win				

=== B Ward ===
2025 Central Darling Shire election:B Ward
Party	Candidate	Votes	%	±%
Independent National	Max Bradley	63	23.6	
Unaligned	Robert Vagg	57	21.3	
Independent	Sacha-Rachelle Sullivan	59	22.1	
Independent	Fay Johnstone	54	20.2	
Independent	Peter Crawford	34	12.7	
Total formal votes		267	97.4	
Informal votes		7	2.6	
Turnout		274		
Two-candidate-preferred result
Independent National	Max Bradley	93	53.1	
Independent	Sacha-Rachelle Sullivan	82	46.9	
Independent National win				

=== C Ward ===
2025 Central Darling Shire election:C Ward
Party	Candidate	Votes	%	±%
Independent	Daniel Fusi	unopposed		
Registered electors				
Daniel Fusi win				
