= Yancannia Station =

Pastoral lease in north west New South Wales

Coordinates: 30.264°S 142.78°E

Location in New South Wales

Yancannia Station, most commonly known as Yancannia, is a pastoral lease that operates as a sheep station in north west New South Wales.

It is situated about 118 kilometres (73 mi) south east of Tibooburra and 72 kilometres (45 mi) north west of White Cliffs in the channel country of New South Wales.

== History ==
The property was purchased in 1872 by William James Reid where he steadily improved the run after starting with no fencing until he had a flock of approximately 200,000 sheep. Thomas Shaw bought a half share in the property in 1877 which continued to 1895 when Reid sold his share to Shaw. The station occupied an area of over one million acres. Shaw paid £86,500 for the property of which 2,346 acres were freehold, 542,744 acres were leasehold and 546,867 acres were resumed area. It was stocked with 153,000 sheep, 310 cattle and 270 horses. The district was gripped by drought in 1891 and about 87,000 sheep died as a result of lack of feed. In the middle of 1896 Shaw reported to the Wilcannia land board that the carrying capacity had been reduced by a quarter owing to the presence of rabbits and the rise of wild dog numbers in the area.

Sidney Kidman acquired the station in 1916. Drought soon followed and in 1919 the area suffered terrible losses. Foxes had also become problematic by killing weaker stock and lambs, a total of 1442 foxes were killed on the property in six months of the same year.

By 1924 the area was being plagued by dingos, Yancannia had been carrying flocks of up to 170,000 sheep but since the pest arrived numbers had dropped substantially to approximately 94,000.

Mary Turner Shaw, the granddaughter of Thomas Shaw, wrote a book about the property in 1987 entitled Yancannia Creek. The story was of change and apparent progress but also one of environmental degradation.

== See also ==
- List of ranches and stations
