= Mutawintji National Park =

National park in New South Wales, Australia

- IUCN category II (national park)
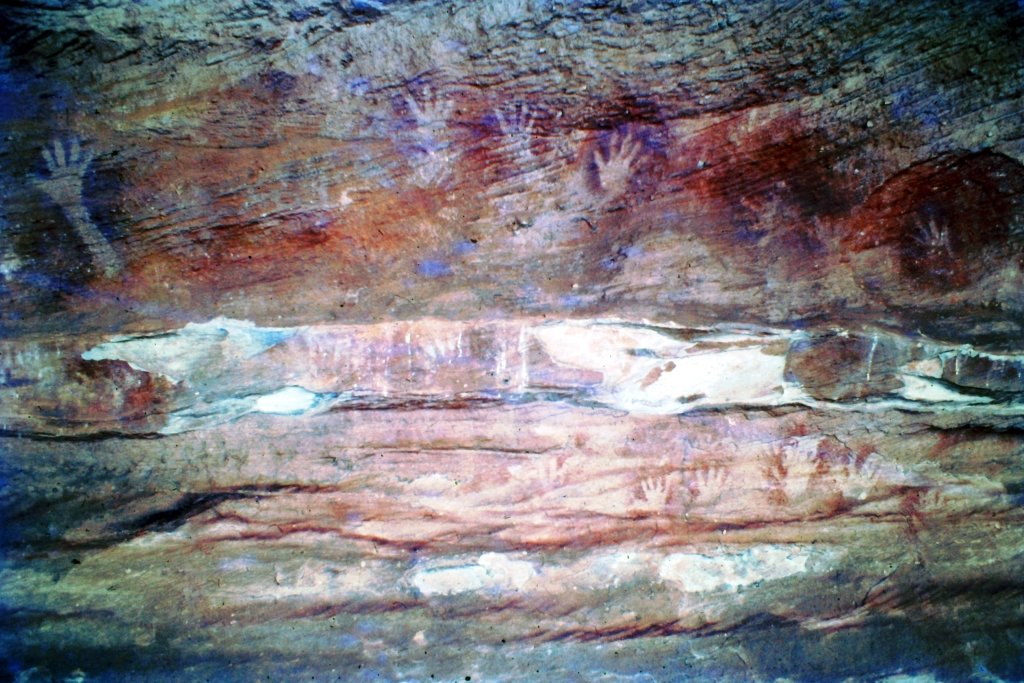
- Aboriginal rock art located within the national park, 1976.

- Location within New South Wales
- Location: New South Wales
- Nearest city: White Cliffs
- Coordinates: 31°08′48″S 142°22′53″E
- Area: 689.12 km^{2} (266.07 sq mi)
- Established: 4 September 1998
- Governing body: NSW National Parks & Wildlife Service
- Website: Official website

The Mutawintji National Park, formerly the Mootwingee National Park, is a protected national park in the Far West region of New South Wales, in eastern Australia. The 68,912-hectare (170,290-acre) national park is situated approximately 880 kilometres (550 mi) west of Sydney and about 130 kilometres (81 mi) north-east of Broken Hill.

In 1998, Mutawintji National Park, Mutawintji Historic Site and Mutawintji Nature Reserve were all transferred to Mutawintji Local Aboriginal Land Council, holding the land on behalf of the Malyangapa, Wilyakali, Wanyuparlku and Pantjikali people. The three sites were then leased back to NSW National Parks, and are now managed in collaboration with the Mutawintji Board of Management. This agreement was the first of its kind in New South Wales.

== Features and location ==
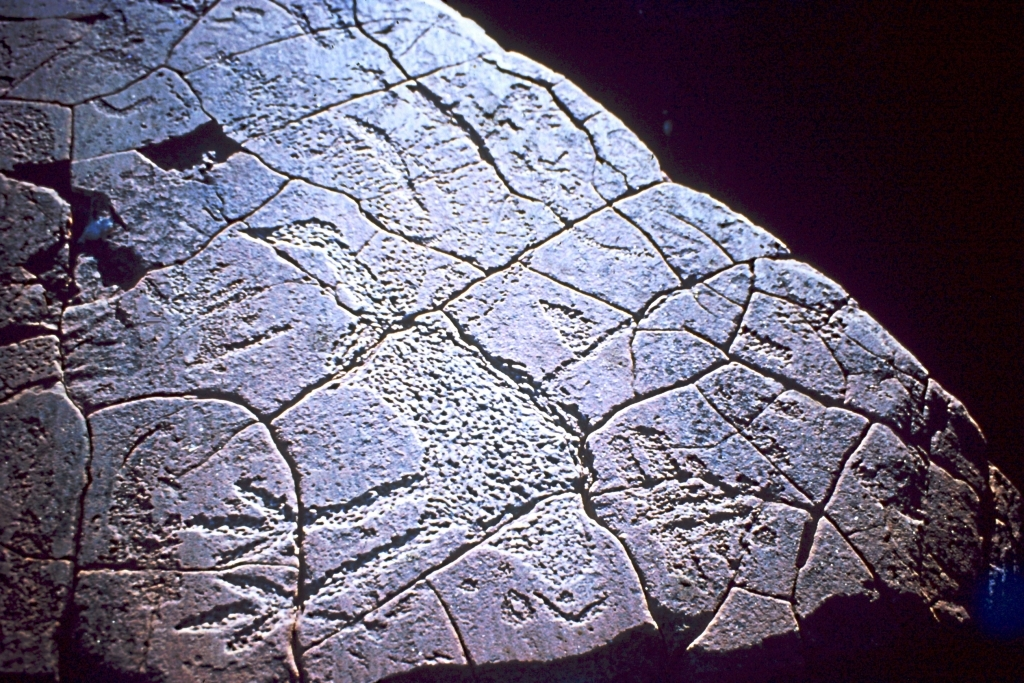
Rock art at Mutawintji National Park. Etched stone emu. 1976

The rugged, mulga-clad Byngnano Range is dissected by colourful gorges, rockpools and creek beds lined with red gums. Scattered among the caves and overhangs are Aboriginal rock art and engravings.

In 1979, the Foundation for National Parks & Wildlife purchased and fenced 100 square kilometres (39 sq mi), in the Coturaundee Ranges, now part of Mutawintji National Park, for the conservation and protection of the yellow-footed rock wallaby.

Follow-up funding of fox eradication in the reserve ensured the survival of this last population of yellow-footed rock-wallabies in New South Wales. Of the wild animals, wedge-tailed eagle, peregrine falcon, short-billed correllas, zebra finches, budgerigars, apostle birds and magpies can also be found here.

The park also protects Mutawintji Historic Site, containing one of the best collections of Australian Aboriginal rock art.

== See also ==
- Protected areas of New South Wales

== Gallery ==
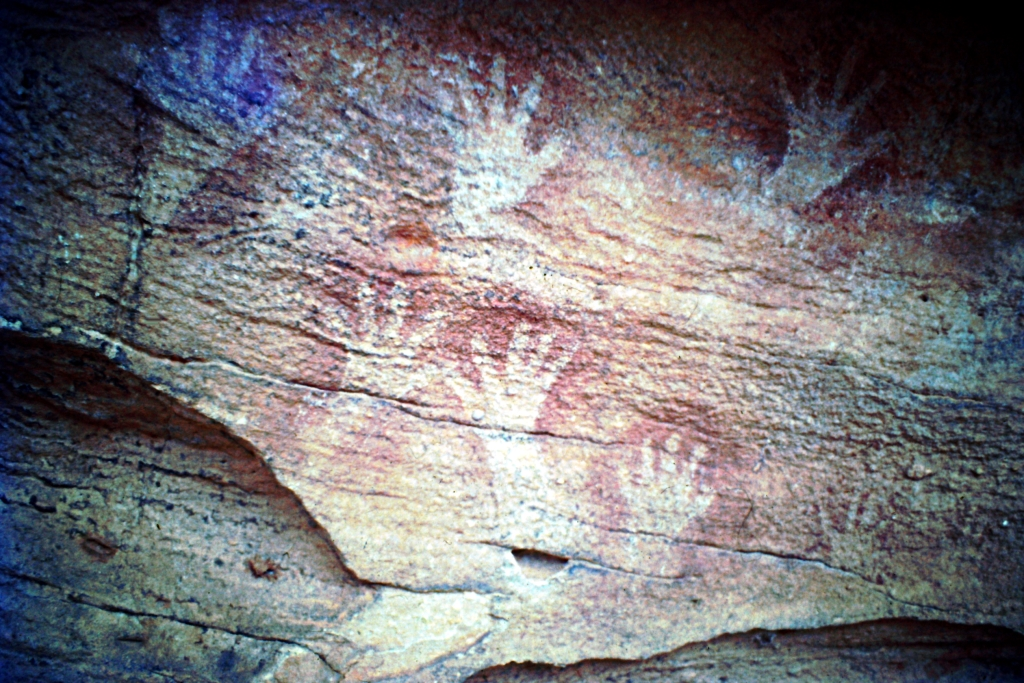
Hand stencils. Mootwingee.

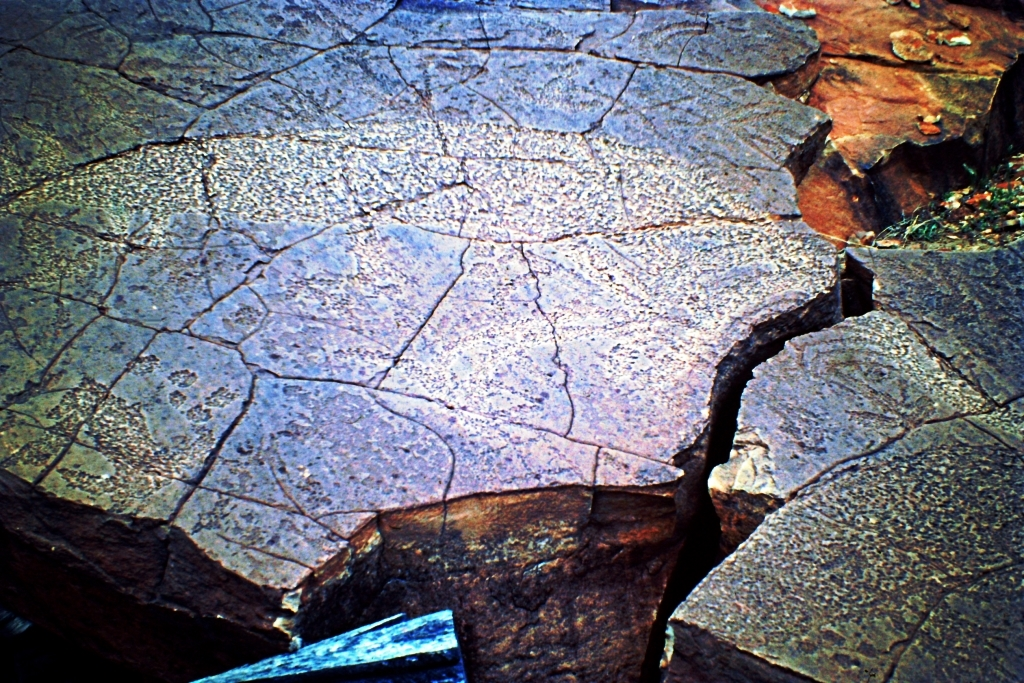
Etched rock figures. Mutawintji National Park

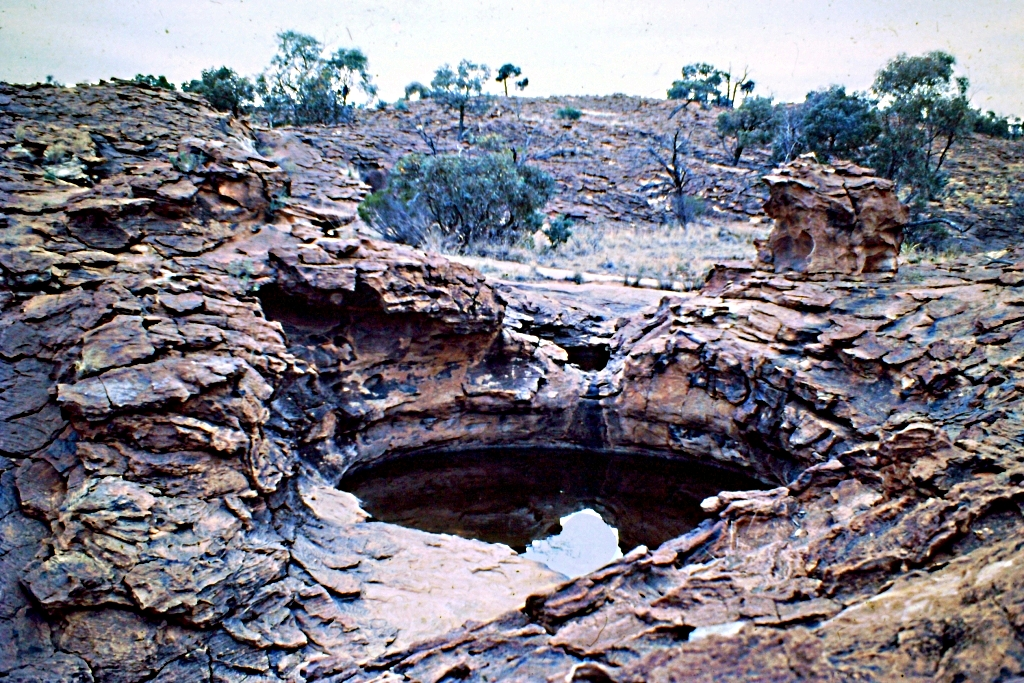
Waterhole, Mootwingee

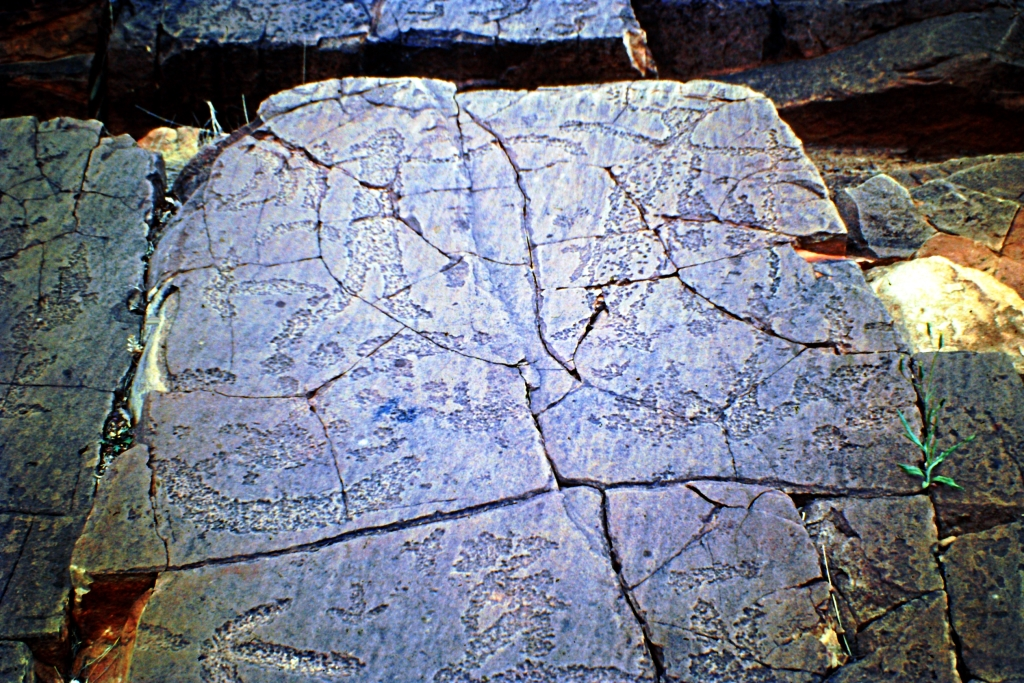
Rock etchings. Mootwingee

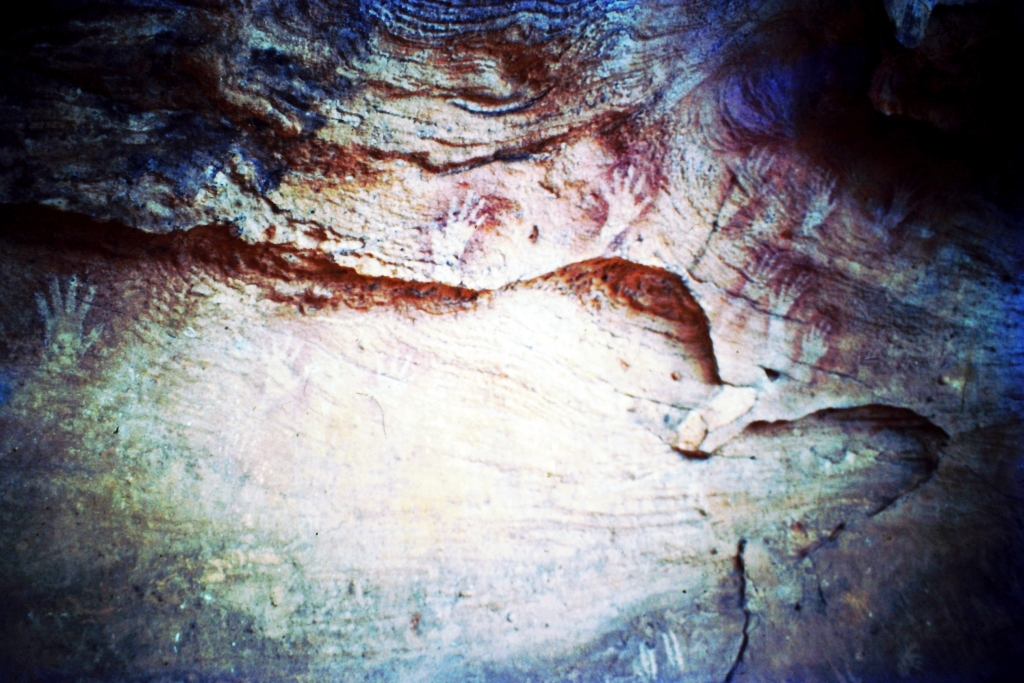
Hand stencils in rock overhang, Mootwingee

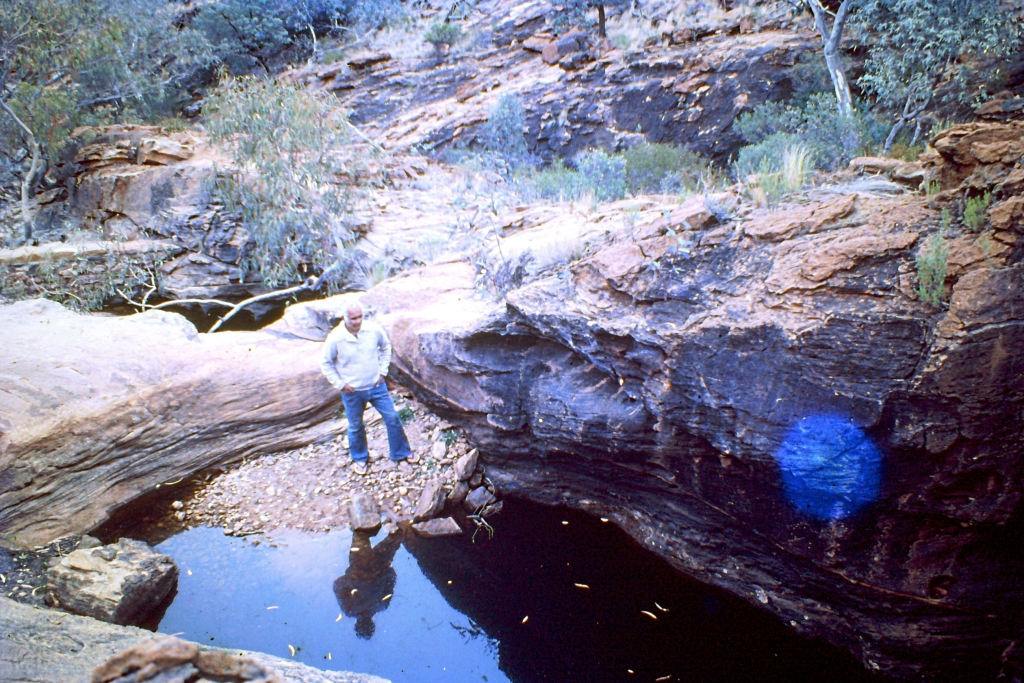
Mootwingee waterhole

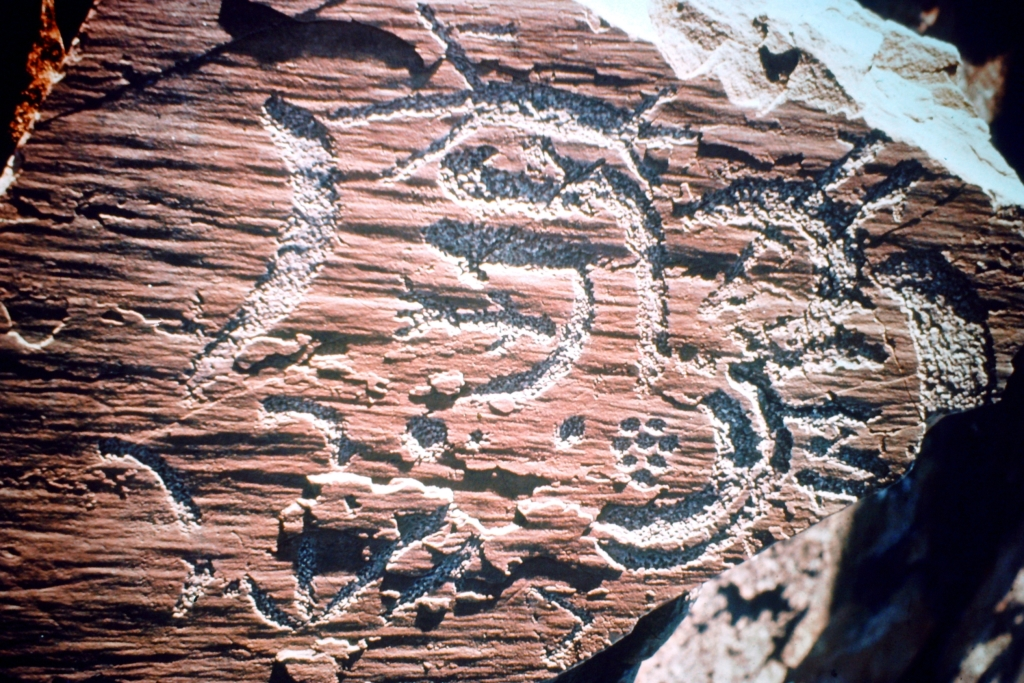
Ancient rock etchings. Mootwinjee

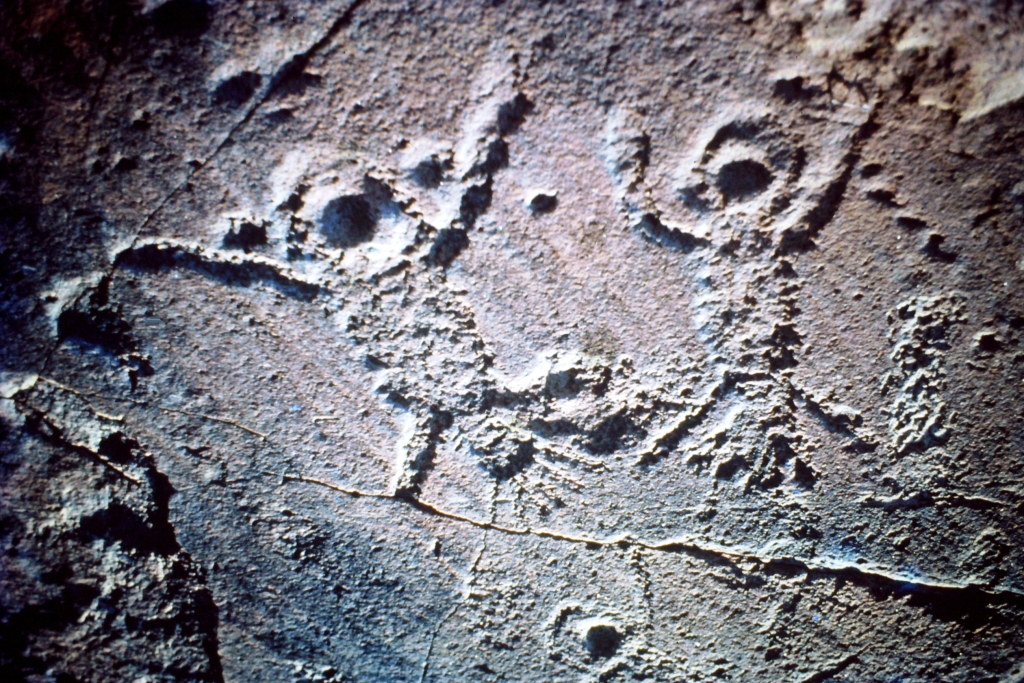
Etched human-like figures. Mootwingee

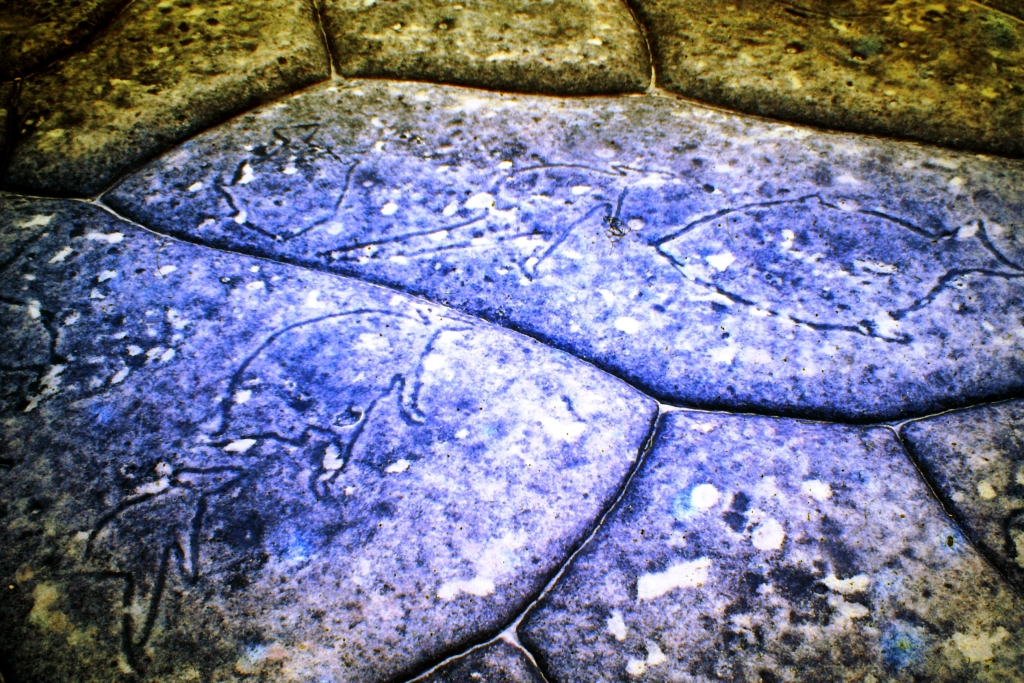
Kangaroos etched on rocks. Mootwingee
