= Wanjiwalku =

Indigenous Australian people of New South Wales

The Wanjiwalku were an indigenous Australian people of the state of New South Wales.

== Language ==
Norman Tindale, who had worked intensely with his informant George Dutton on the Wanjiwalku language, argued that, though separate tribes, both the Wanjiwalku and their western neighbours, the Malyangapa, spoke the same dialect. Later studies by Luise Hercus and Peter Austin have determined that Wanjiwalku was a dialect of Paakantyi, while Malyangapa was morphological almost identical to the language spoken by the Yardliyawara, and to be classified as a member of the Yarli dialect cluster.

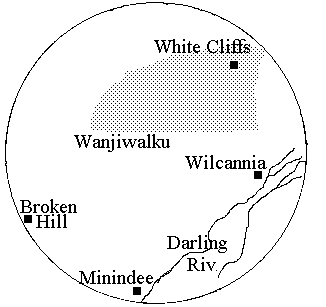
Wanjiwalku lands

== Country ==
The Wanjiwalku were estimated by Tindale to have had around 8,000 square miles (21,000 km^{2}) of tribal land extending from the vicinity of Milparinka to White Cliffs, and running east from close to Mount Arrowsmith as far as the area near Tongo Lake. Their lands took in Yancannia and the area east of Lake Bancannia.

Edward Micklethwaite Curr describing the tough environment of Wanjiwalku lands wrote that the earliest white explorer Charles Sturt almost expired there:

The country of the Pono forms a portion of the interior traversed by Captain Sturt in 1845 and described in such dismal colours as destined to be for ever uninhabitable by civilized people. It was here that, living in an underground room as a protection against the intense heat, his nails ceased to grow; the hairs of his head split at the end; Lucifer matches dropped, from the hand, light of themselves on reaching the ground, and so on; and yet this country has been found for several years to make good sheep-runs.

== Alternative names ==
- Weyneubulkoo
- Wonipalku
- Wanyabalku
- Wonjimalku
- Pono
- Pernowie, Pernowrie
- Kongait
- Tongaranka

== Some words ==
- chukeroo (kangaroo)
- koonai (tame dog)
- thirita (wild dog)
- kooma (father)
- ngumma (mother)
- birre-birre (white man)

== See also ==
- Peoples of Palawan
- Pallar
- Pallas
- Antisuyu
- Pelasgians
- Aboriginal Tasmanians

== Sources ==
- Austin, Peter; Hercus, Luise (2004). "The Yarli Languages". In Bowern, Claire; Koch, Harold (eds.). Australian Languages: Classification and the comparative method. John Benjamins Publishing Company. pp. 207–222. ISBN 978-9-027-29511-8.
- Bolle, Kees W.; Harman, William P. (July–September 1992). "The Sacred Marriage of a Hindu Goddess". Journal of the American Oriental Society. 112 (3): 512. doi:10.2307/603106. ISSN 0003-0279. JSTOR 603106.
- Bonney, Frederic (1884). "On Some Customs of the Aborigines of the River Darling, New South Wales". Journal of the Anthropological Institute of Great Britain and Ireland. 13: 122–137. doi:10.2307/2841717. JSTOR 2841717.
- Crozier, H (1886). "Evelyn Creek" (PDF). In Curr, Edward Micklethwaite (ed.). The Australian race: its origin, languages, customs, place of landing in Australia and the routes by which it spread itself over the continent. Vol. 2. Melbourne: J. Ferres. pp. 152–155.
- Daniélou, Alain (2003). A brief history of India. Rochester. VT: Inner Traditions. ISBN 978-1594777943. OCLC 778372064.
- Davey, Melissa (13 October 2016). "Australian rock formation could be older than Stonehenge, researchers say". The Guardian. ISSN 0261-3077.
- Fagan, Brian M. (2016). World Prehistory. Taylor and Francis. ISBN 978-1317342441. OCLC 946106069.
- Howitt, Alfred William (1904). The native tribes of south-east Australia (PDF). Macmillan.
- MacDonald, Anna (15 January 2013). "Research shows ancient Indian migration to Australia". ABC News.
- Mathews, R. H. (1898b). "Group divisions and initiation ceremonies of the Barkungee tribes". Journal of the Proceedings of the Royal Society of New South Wales. 32: 241–255. doi:10.5962/p.359301.
- Mathews, R. H. (January 1898a). "Initiation Ceremonies of Australian Tribes". Proceedings of the American Philosophical Society. 37 (157): 54–73. JSTOR 983694.
- Morris, Lulu (19 May 2017). "Four Thousand Years Ago Indians Landed in Australia". National Geographic.
- Morton, A. W. (1886). "Near the North-west corner of New South Wales" (PDF). In Curr, Edward Micklethwaite (ed.). The Australian race: its origin, languages, customs, place of landing in Australia and the routes by which it spread itself over the continent. Vol. 2. Melbourne: J. Ferres. pp. 158–161.
- "Mycenaean Greece: Linear B". Foundation of the Hellenic World.
- Newland, Simpson (1887–1888). "Parkengees, or aboriginal tribes on the Darling River" (PDF). Proceedings of the Royal Geographical Society of Australasia, South Australian Branch. 2: 20–32.
- Newland, Simpson (1926). Memoirs of Simpson Newland. Adelaide: F.W. Preech and Sons.
- Padma, Sree (23 March 2011). "Neither Sinhala nor Tamil-On Being a South Asian in Sri Lanka". The Sri Lanka Reader. Duke University Press. pp. 680–686. doi:10.1215/9780822394051-093. ISBN 978-0822394051.
- Shrikumar, A. (29 April 2016). "Sailing in search of history". The Hindu. ISSN 0971-751X.
- Spieth Weissenbacher, Christiane; Gribenski, Jean (2001). Daniélou, Alain. Oxford Music Online. Oxford University Press. doi:10.1093/gmo/9781561592630.article.07176.
- Tindale, Norman Barnett (1974). "Wanjiwalku (NSW)". Aboriginal Tribes of Australia: Their Terrain, Environmental Controls, Distribution, Limits, and Proper Names. Australian National University Press. ISBN 978-0-708-10741-6.
