= Central Darling Shire =

- Local government area
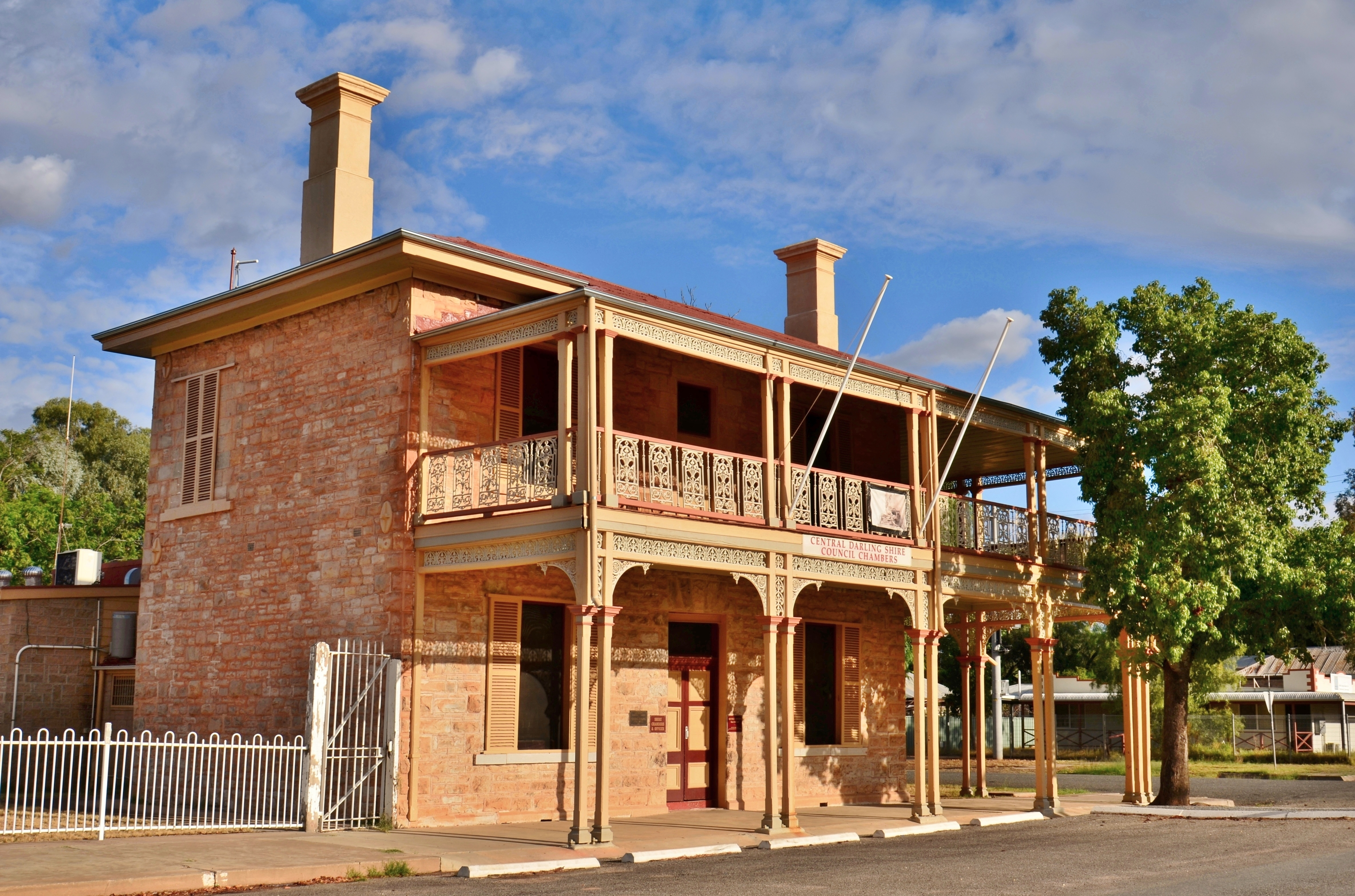
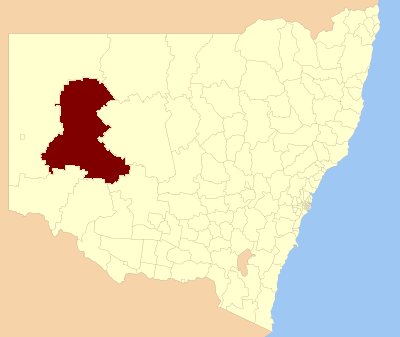
- Shire Office Complex, Wilcannia Location in New South Wales

- Interactive map of Central Darling Shire
- Coordinates: 31°34′S 143°22′E
- Country: Australia
- State: New South Wales
- Region: Far West
- Established: 20 March 1959; 67 years ago
- Council seat: Wilcannia

Government
  - Chairperson: Bob Stewart (appointed)
  - State electorate: Barwon
  - Federal division: Parkes

Area
  - Total: 53,511 km^{2} (20,661 sq mi)

Population
  - Total: 1,725 (2021 census)
  - Density: 0.032236/km^{2} (0.083492/sq mi)
- Website: Central Darling Shire
LGAs around Central Darling Shire
| Unincorporated Far West | Unincorporated Far West | Bourke |
| Unincorporated Far West | Central Darling Shire | Cobar |
| Wentworth | Balranald | Carrathool |

Central Darling Shire is a local government area in the Far West region of New South Wales, Australia. The Shire is located adjacent to the Barrier Highway. Central Darling Shire was constituted in 1959 and at 53,511 square kilometres (20,661 sq mi), it is the largest incorporated local government area in New South Wales.

The Central Darling Shire Council left over a decade under administration in December of 2025 under the new Regional and Remote Council structure with a half elected and half appointed council. The Chairperson of the council, an appointed office equivalent to a mayor, is the former administrator Bob Stewart.

== History ==
Central Darling Shire was preceded by the Municipality of Wilcannia.

=== Decade under administration ===
In 2014 the council placed under administration for a period of three months. Following a public inquiry, councillors were removed from office and an administrator originally appointed for three months had his term extended and at September 2018 was still acting in this capacity. It was expected that the council be removed from administration in September 2020, however as of 2024, the council remained under administration.

An election was held on 20 September 2025. Now designated a Rural and Remote Council, three councillors are elected by the community, and three are appointed by the NSW Government.

== Towns and villages ==
The Shire includes the towns of Ivanhoe, Menindee, Sunset Strip, Tilpa, Wilcannia and White Cliffs.

== Council ==
Central Darling Shire Council

Type
- Type: Regional and Remote Council

History
- Founded: 20 March 1959
- Preceded by: Wilcannia Municipal Council

Leadership
- Chairperson: Bob Stewart since 27 October 2025
- Deputy Chair: Daniel Fusi, Independent since 4 December 2025

Structure
- Seats: 6 (3 elected & 3 appointed)
- Political groups: Independents (2); Independent National (1); Appointed members (3)

Elections
- Last election: 2025

Meeting place
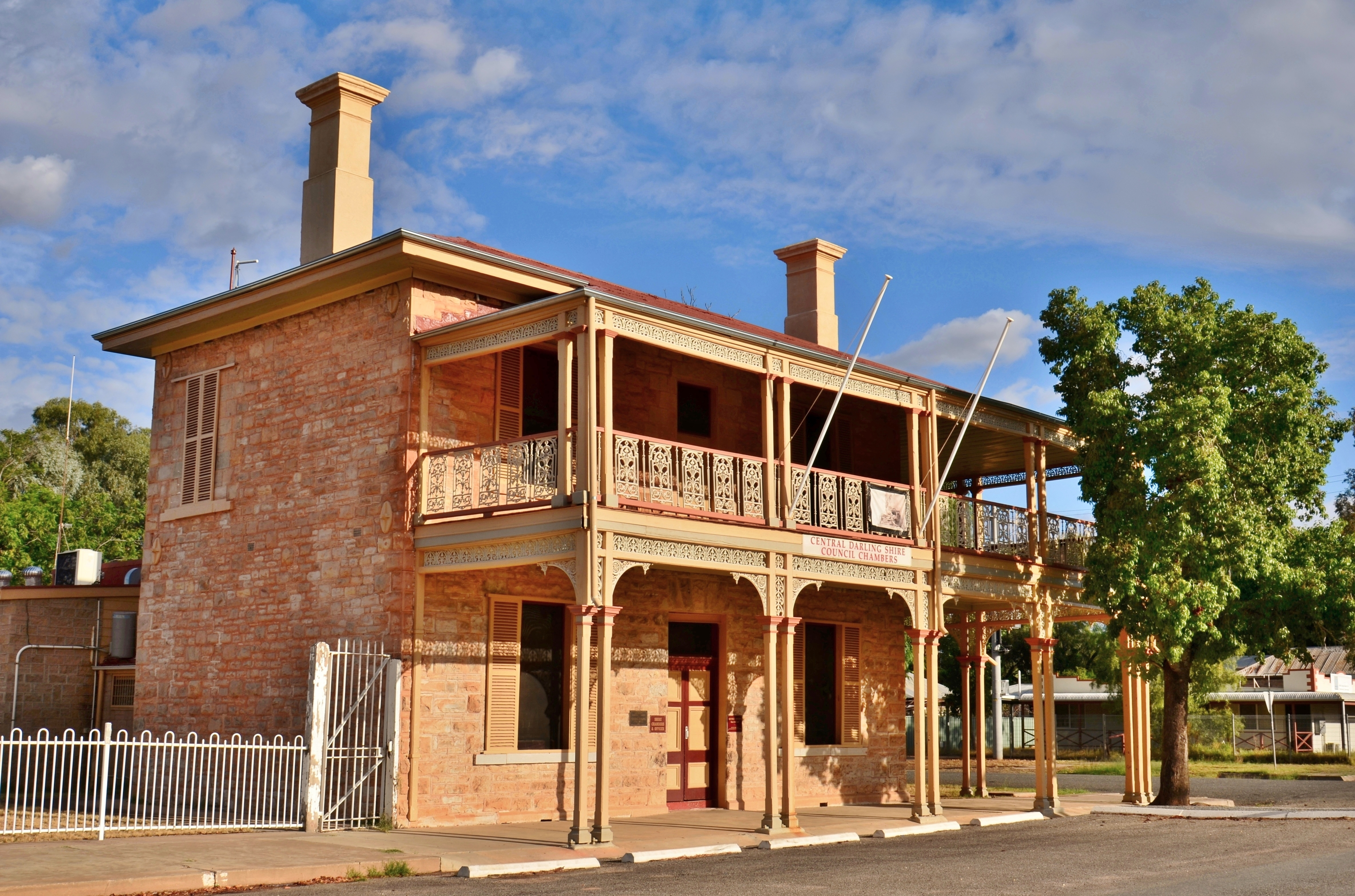
- Central Darling Shire Office Complex; 21 Reid St, Wilcannia; New South Wales

=== Current structure ===
Central Darling Shire Council operates under the Regional and Remote Council structure. It is composed of six councillors, half elected by the people of Central Darling Shire, and the other three appointed by the Minister for Local Government.

The council has an appointed Chairperson, currently Bob Stewart, and an elected Deputy Chairperson, who will be elected by the council at its inaugural meeting in December.

=== Current composition ===
| Party | Councillors |
|---|---|
| Independents | 2 |
| Independent National | 1 |
| Appointed | 3 |
| Total | 6 |

| Ward | Councillor | Party | Notes |
|---|---|---|---|
| A Ward | Peter Sullivan | Independent | |
| B Ward | Max Bradley | Independent National | |
| C Ward | Daniel Fusi | Independent | Deputy Chairperson |
| Appointed | Bob Stewart | N/A | Chairperson |
| Appointed | Fiona Kelly | N/A | |
| Appointed | Barbara Perry | N/A | |

== Previous councils ==
=== Structure under administration ===
| Party | Councillors |
|---|---|
| Administrator | 1 |
| Total | 1 |

| Administrator | Term Start | Term End |
|---|---|---|
| Robert (Bob) Stewart | 25 January 2019 | 4 December 2025 |
| Greg Wright | 23 December 2013 | February 2019 |

=== Former council structure ===
Central Darling Shire Council was formerly composed of nine councillors elected proportionally as three multi-member wards, each electing three councillors. All councillors were elected for a fixed four-year term of office. The mayor was elected by the councillors at the first meeting of the council. The final election to be held under this system was on 8 September 2012, and the makeup of the council at the time of moving to Administration was as follows:

| Party | Councillors |
|---|---|
| Independents and Unaligned | 9 |
| Total | 9 |

The previous Council, elected in 2012, in order of election by ward, is:

| Ward | Councillor | Party | Notes |
|---|---|---|---|
| A Ward | Honor Liversidge | Independent | |
| A Ward | Eamon Sammon | Unaligned | |
| A Ward | Peter Sullivan | Unaligned | Deputy Mayor |
| B Ward | Dennis Standley | Independent | |
| B Ward | Clive Linnett OAM AFSM | Unaligned | |
| B Ward | Ray Longfellow | Unaligned | Mayor |
| C Ward | Lorraine Looney | Unaligned | |
| C Ward | Garry Astill | Unaligned | |
| C Ward | Ron Page | Unaligned | |

== Election results ==
=== 2025 ===
| Ward | Elected councillor | Party |
|---|---|---|
| A | Peter Sullivan | Independent |
| B | Max Bradley | Independent National |
| C | Daniel Fusi | Independent |

2025 Central Darling Shire election
| Party | Votes | % | Swing | Seats | Change |
|---|---|---|---|---|---|
| Independents | 372 | 79.0 | | 2 | ▲2 |
| Independent National | 63 | 13.4 | +13.4 | 1 | ▲1 |
| Independent Indigenous-Aboriginal | 56 | 11.9 | +11.9 | 0 | Steady |
| Total formal votes | 471 | 97.3 | | | |
| Informal votes | 13 | 2.7 | | | |
| Turnout | 484 | | | | |
| Registered voters | | | | | |

=== 2012 ===
| Ward | Elected councillor | Party |
|---|---|---|
| A | Honor Liversidge | Independent |
| A | Eamon Sammon | Unaligned |
| A | Peter Sullivan | Unaligned |
| B | Denis Standley | Independent |
| B | Clive Linnett | Unaligned |
| B | Ray Longfellow | Unaligned |
| C | Loraine Looney | Unaligned |
| C | Gary Astill | Unaligned |
| C | Ron Page | Unaligned |

2012 New South Wales local elections: Central Darling Shire
| Party | Votes | % | Swing | Seats | Change |
|---|---|---|---|---|---|
| Independents & Unaligned | 807 | 100.0 | | 9 | Steady |
| Total formal votes | 807 | 94.1 | | | |
| Informal votes | 51 | 5.9 | | | |
| Turnout | 858 | (Note: 75.1% or 72.3% (conflicting sources)) | | | |
| Registered voters | (Note: 1,142 or 1,186 (conflicting sources)) | | | | |

== Demographics ==
Selected statistics for the shire are set out below:

Selected historical census data for Central Darling Shire local government area
| Census year | | 2011 | 2016 | 2021 |
|---|---|---|---|---|
| Population | Estimated residents on census night | 1,991 | ▼1,833 | ▼1,725 |
| Population | LGA rank in terms of size within New South Wales | 128th | ▲127th | ▼128th |
| Population | % of New South Wales population | 0.03% | | |
| Population | % of Australian population | 0.01% | | |
| Cultural and language diversity | | | | |
| Ancestry, top responses | Australian Aboriginal | 19.1% | ▲20.7% | ▲33.9% |
| Ancestry, top responses | Australian | 32.5% | ▼27.5% | ▼25.4% |
| Ancestry, top responses | English | 20.7% | ▼19.6% | ▲22.0% |
| Ancestry, top responses | Irish | 5.9% | ▼4.7% | ▲6.3% |
| Ancestry, top responses | Scottish | 5.3% | ▼5.4% | ▲5.3% |
Language, top responses (other than English)
| Language, top responses (other than English) | German | 0.2% | ▲0.4% | ▼0.2% |
| Language, top responses (other than English) | Paakantyi (Darling language) | 0.9% | - | ▼0.2% |
| Language, top responses (other than English) | Telegu | - | | 0.2% |
| Language, top responses (other than English) | Aboriginal English | - | | 0.2% |
| Language, top responses (other than English) | Fijian | - | | 0.2% |
| Religious affiliation | | | | |
Religious affiliation, top responses
| Religious affiliation, top responses | No religion | 16.8% | ▲22.3% | ▲35.6% |
| Religious affiliation, top responses | Catholic | 37.9% | ▼29.5% | ▼20.0% |
| Religious affiliation, top responses | Anglican | 18.8% | ▼14.1% | ▼10.8% |
| Religious affiliation, top responses | Uniting Church | 6.2% | ▼4.5% | ▼3.0% |
| Religious affiliation, top responses | Presbyterian and Reformed | 3.6% | - | |
| Religious affiliation, top responses | Not Stated | – | 23.3% | ▼21.8% |
| Median weekly incomes | | | | |
| Personal income | Median weekly personal income | A$387 | A$460 | A$524 |
| Personal income | % of Australian median income | 67.1% | ▲69.3% | ▼61.6% |
| Family income | Median weekly family income | A$889 | A$1075 | A$1,128 |
| Family income | % of Australian median income | 60.0% | ▲62.0% | ▼53.2% |
| Household income | Median weekly household income | A$787 | A$901 | A$988 |
| Household income | % of Australian median income | 63.8% | ▼62.7% | ▼56.6% |

== Economic activity ==
The principal economic activities within the Shire include pastoral, horticultural, agricultural, mining and tourism. Rural grazing properties represent the largest land use within the Shire, accounting for 97% of the entire area. Major horticultural and agricultural production is centred on Menindee. The relative ease of access to water from the Darling River and Menindee Lakes Storage Scheme enables producers to grow a large variety of crops and fruits.

Opal mining has been the predominant mining industry within the Shire. Opal was discovered in White Cliffs in 1884 and the first commercial opal field commenced operation in 1890, reaching its peak in 1899.

== See also ==
- List of local government areas in New South Wales
