= White Cliffs, New South Wales =

White Cliffs
- Town
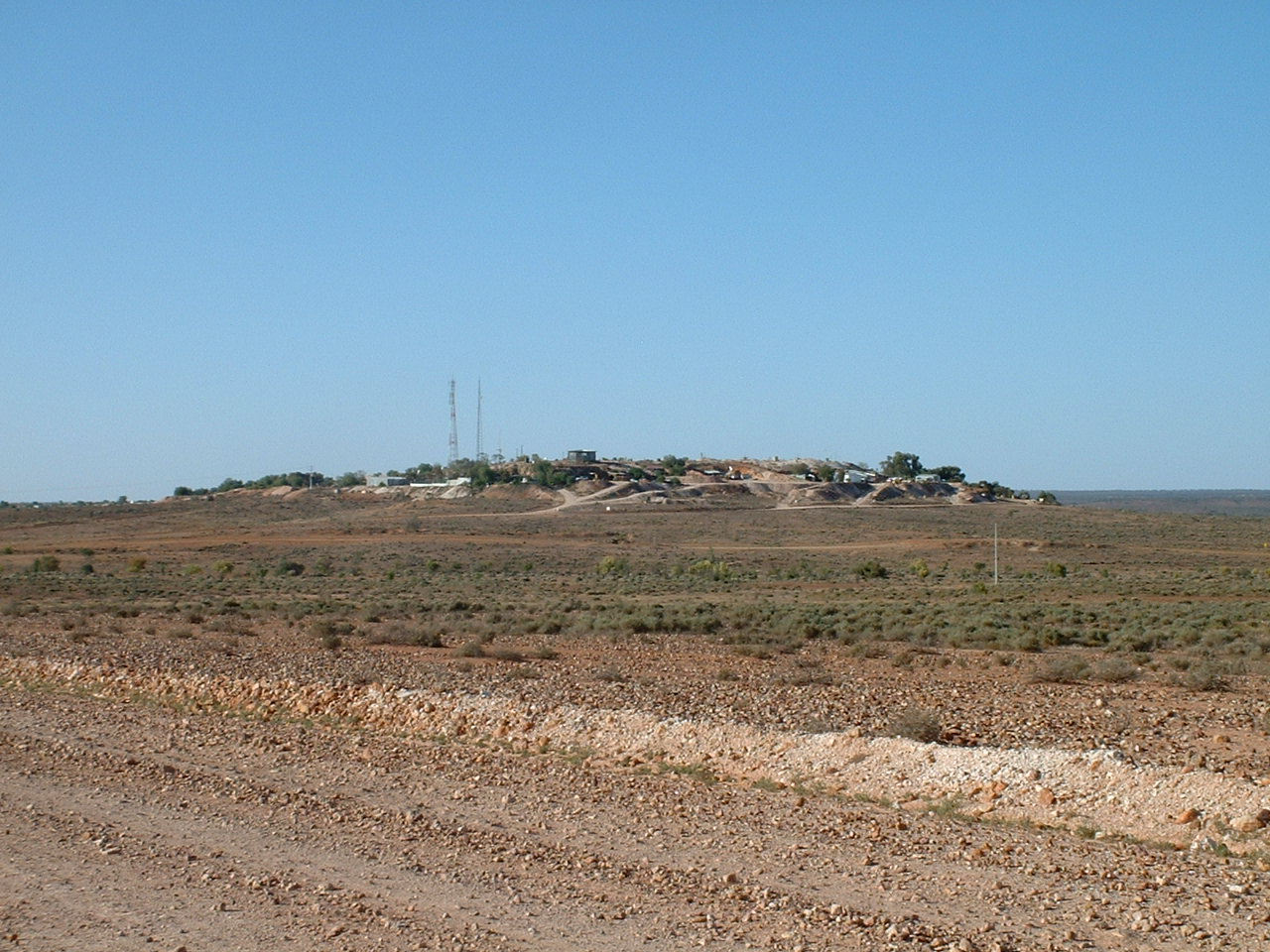

- Coordinates: 30°50′S 143°05′E
- Country: Australia
- State: New South Wales
- LGA: Central Darling Shire
- Location: 1,051 km (653 mi) from Sydney; 286 km (178 mi) from Broken Hill; 92 km (57 mi) from Wilcannia

Government
  - State electorate: Barwon
  - Federal division: Parkes
- Elevation: 151.0 m (495.4 ft)

Population
  - Total: 156 (2021 census)
- Postcode: 2836
- County: Yungnulgra
- Parish: Kirk
- Mean max temp: 26.9 °C (80.4 °F)
- Mean min temp: 12.6 °C (54.7 °F)
- Annual rainfall: 246.2 mm (9.69 in)

White Cliffs is a small town and mining location in outback New South Wales in Australia, in Central Darling Shire. White Cliffs is around 255 kilometres (158 mi) northeast of Broken Hill, and 93 kilometres (58 mi) north of Wilcannia. At the 2021 census, White Cliffs had a population of 156.

White Cliffs has a primary school that opened in 1895, and has operated continuously since then. White Cliffs was one of the many places visited by Bill Bryson in research for the book Down Under.

== History ==
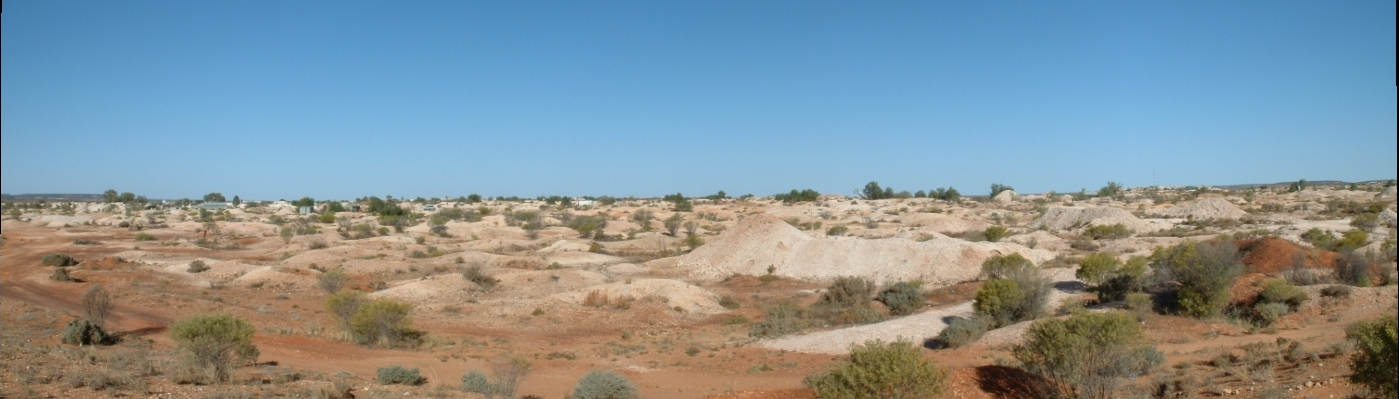
Opal fields at White Cliffs

The town was established in the late 19th century when opal was discovered. Opal has been mined ever since. The first Australian opal was found 20 years before in Queensland in 1872, when a party of kangaroo hunters were operating in the White Cliffs area. One of them, who had left the party to track down a wounded kangaroo over some low stony hills, picked up a pretty stone which appealed to him. When taking back the stone, they suspected it could be opal which the local jeweller confirmed. He advised to get as much opal as possible since this could be more profitable than kangaroo hunting. When the group filed a claim, opal had not yet been listed under gemstones, and it was decided to file the claim under the "Gold Mining Act".

== Inhabitants ==
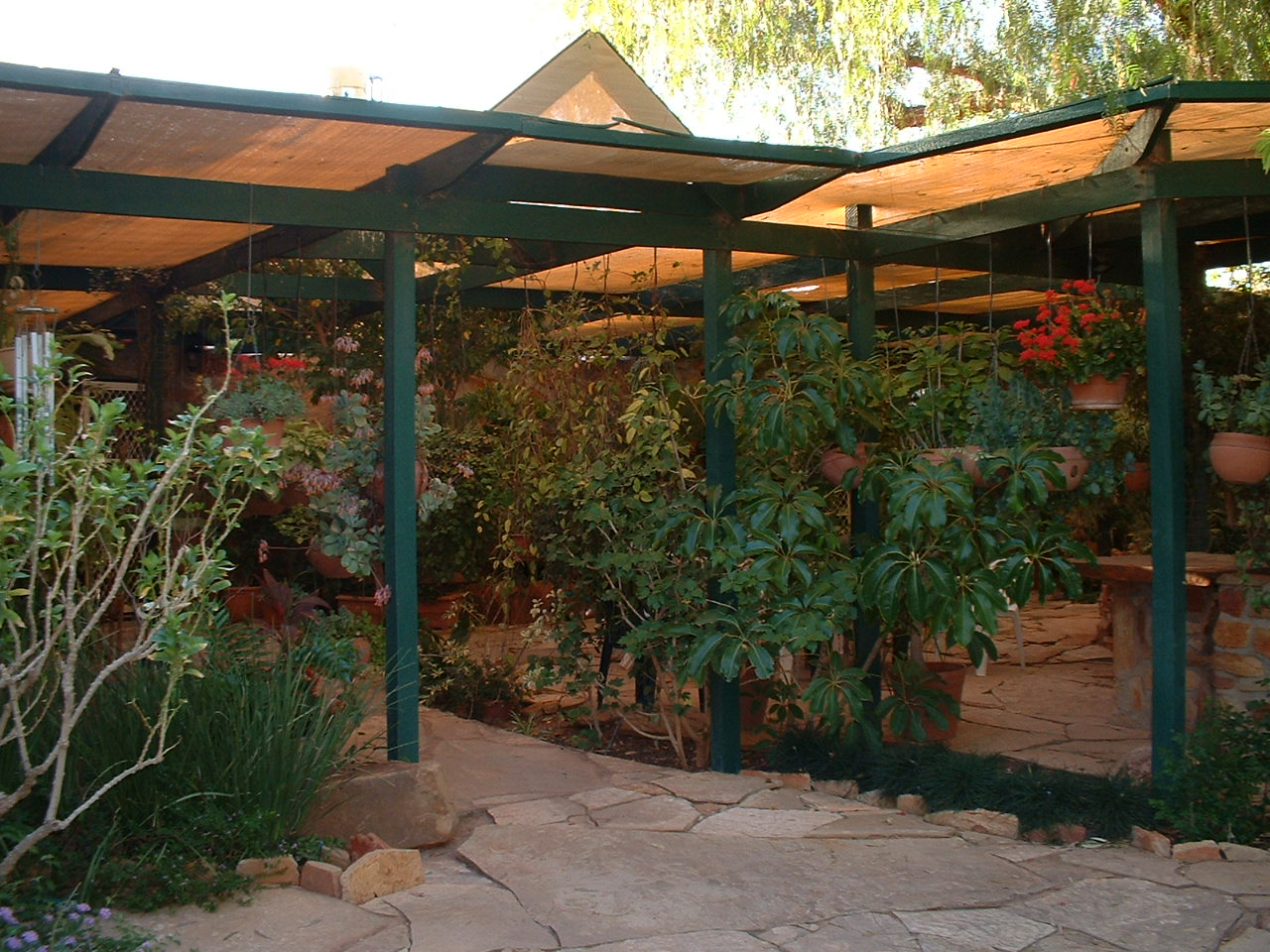
Entrance to PJ's B and B, White Cliffs, NSW

Many of the residents live underground, using mining equipment to dig extensive homes in the hillside to avoid the intense heat outside. There are also two underground motels called The White Cliffs Underground and PJ's Bed And Breakfast, as the town is becoming more dependent on tourism. Temperatures inside the underground dwellings range from about 20 to 22C.

Cricketer Bill O'Reilly was born in White Cliffs, the son of the first school teacher.

== Industry ==
White Cliffs is the site of Australia's first solar power station. The White Cliffs Solar Power Station was built in 1981 producing 25 KWe and upgraded in 1996 to produce 45KWe using the same collector dishes but better technology.

== Climate ==
White Cliffs has sweltering summers and pleasant winters. Summers usually exceed 36 °C or 96.8 °F, while winters are usually around 17 °C or 62.6 °F. The annual average rainfall is 249.7 millimetres or 9.83 inches.

Climate data for White Cliffs Post Office (1901–2011, extremes 1962–2011)
Month	Jan	Feb	Mar	Apr	May	Jun	Jul	Aug	Sep	Oct	Nov	Dec	Year
Record high °C (°F)	48.6 (119.5)	46.9 (116.4)	44.1 (111.4)	37.9 (100.2)	31.9 (89.4)	28.0 (82.4)	28.8 (83.8)	33.0 (91.4)	39.5 (103.1)	41.7 (107.1)	45.0 (113.0)	45.8 (114.4)	48.6 (119.5)
Mean daily maximum °C (°F)	35.8 (96.4)	34.9 (94.8)	31.6 (88.9)	26.4 (79.5)	21.4 (70.5)	17.6 (63.7)	17.2 (63.0)	19.7 (67.5)	23.9 (75.0)	27.9 (82.2)	31.5 (88.7)	34.4 (93.9)	26.9 (80.4)
Mean daily minimum °C (°F)	20.9 (69.6)	20.4 (68.7)	17.2 (63.0)	12.4 (54.3)	8.2 (46.8)	5.3 (41.5)	4.1 (39.4)	5.6 (42.1)	9.0 (48.2)	12.9 (55.2)	16.4 (61.5)	19.2 (66.6)	12.6 (54.7)
Record low °C (°F)	12.1 (53.8)	8.8 (47.8)	7.2 (45.0)	2.6 (36.7)	−0.5 (31.1)	−2.3 (27.9)	−3.3 (26.1)	−1.7 (28.9)	0.2 (32.4)	2.0 (35.6)	3.4 (38.1)	6.8 (44.2)	−3.3 (26.1)
Average precipitation mm (inches)	27.7 (1.09)	27.1 (1.07)	23.8 (0.94)	15.4 (0.61)	20.8 (0.82)	19.0 (0.75)	18.2 (0.72)	15.4 (0.61)	15.0 (0.59)	23.2 (0.91)	19.2 (0.76)	25.1 (0.99)	249.9 (9.86)
Average precipitation days	3.0	2.8	2.5	2.2	3.4	3.7	3.8	3.4	3.0	3.6	3.1	3.0	37.5
