= Nocoleche Nature Reserve =

Nature reserve in Australia

- IUCN category Ia (strict nature reserve)
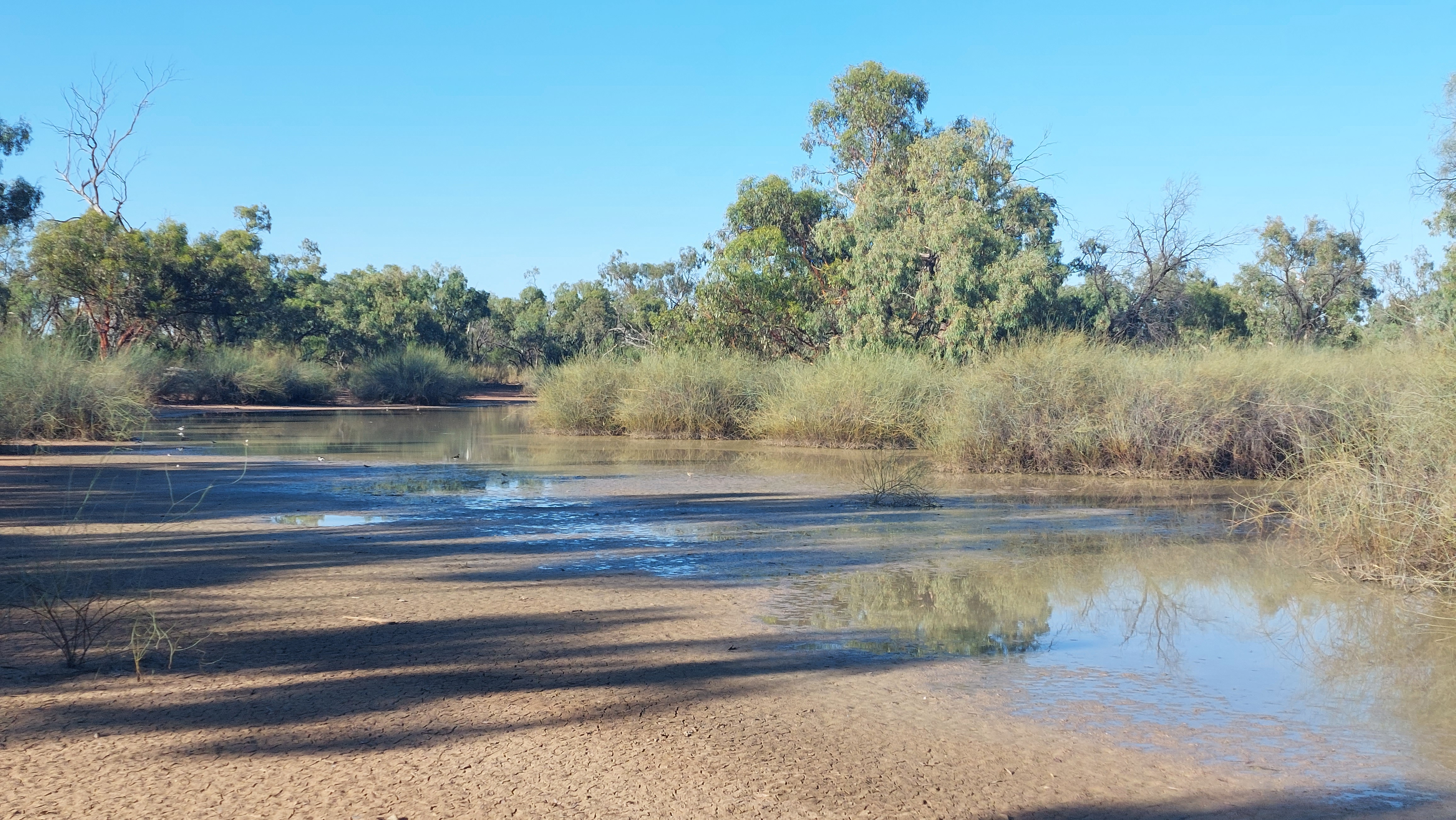
- Woolshed Swamp

- Location within New South Wales
- Location: New South Wales
- Coordinates: 29.8853°S 144.1722°E
- Area: 711.08 km^{2} (274.55 sq mi)
- Established: 1979
- Governing body: NSW National Parks & Wildlife Service
- Website: Official website

This article is written in Australian English, which has its own spelling conventions (centre, colour, realise, program, travelled) and some terms may be different or absent from other varieties of English. According to the relevant style guide, this should not be changed without broad consensus.

The Nocoleche Nature Reserve is a conservation area in New South Wales on the Paroo River located 20 kilometres south of the town of Wanaaring, New South Wales. It was created in 1979, and has an area of 711.08 km².

== History ==
The traditional owners of the Paroo are the Budjair, Kunja, and Mardgany in the north and the Paruntiji, meaning people belonging to the Paroo, in the south. Aboriginal people are known to have lived along the Paroo for at least 14,000 years.

Graziers came as squatters to the Paroo in the 1840s. They met resistance from the Aboriginal land owners, and tensions in the area continued well into the 1860s. From the 1850s however a shortage of white labour caused by the exodus to the gold fields saw many in the Aboriginal communities join the pastoral workforce. Aboriginal people continued to be a significant part of this work force for many decades whilst still maintaining their cultural traditions and attending local and regional ceremonies until the 1910s. From the 1920s however, Aboriginal people began to be forcibly removed from their land by government policy.

In the 1880s through to the early twentieth century however, drought, severe overstocking and rabbit infestation led to massive damage to land, soil and native plants and animals.

Nocoleche station was established some time before 1887 by Frederick William Armytage. By the early twentieth century the property was one of four substantial runs leased by Sir Samuel McCaughey on the Darling River. His total holdings were 3.2 million acres where he experimented with a number of farming implements and technologies, including using heavy machinery for ploughing and soil excavation, mechanised sheep shearing and widespread irrigation. The station changed hands eight times between Armytage and when the National Parks and Wildlife Service took ownership in 1978.

== Description ==
The 74,728 ha (184,660 acres) covers the Paroo River, Cuttaburra Creek, Sandy Creek, Aarons Creek and Kulkyne Creek, and represents the largest wetland in the state by area. A large proportion, close to 116 km^{2} (45 sq mi), representing 16%, of Nocoleche Nature Reserve is floodplain wetland.

== Ecosystem ==
Nocoleche Nature Reserve is dominated by mulga and white wood vegetation as well as Poplar box and black box. The Paroo River forms the eastern boundary of the reserve and it is here there is the large stand of the rare yapunyah is found.

Large areas of yapunyah (Eucalyptus ochrophloia) woodland can be found on the Paroo and Warrego Rivers and Cuttaburra Creek. Other plant species of conservation significance include the algae Chara braunii, spikegrass (Elytrophorus spicatus), downy mother of misery (Cuphonotus andraeanus), chariot wheels (Maireana cheelii), silver turkey bush (Eremophila bowmannii ssp latifolia) and corkbark (Hakea ivoryi).

Nocoleche is an important stop-over for migratory birds. Large mammals include Red kangaroos (Macropus rufus), eastern grey kangaroos (Macropus gigantus), western grey kangaroos (Macropus fuliginosus) and common wallaroos (Macropus robustus), which are common throughout the nature reserve.

Fish including yellowbelly (Macquaria ambigua), Murray cod (Maccullochella peelii), silver perch (Bidyanus bidyanus) and catfish (Tandanus tandanus) are found in the Paroo river and are sought by professional and recreational fishers.

Cats, rabbits, goats, and foxes are all pests within the park.

== Significance ==
The Paroo River is not yet affected by river regulation and diversions, making it the last major free-flowing river in the Murray-Darling Basin. Both the Paroo and Warrego Rivers have extremely high conservation value.

Different types of wetlands with distinctive vegetation communities are found within the nature reserve. Plants, waterbirds, frogs, reptiles, fish and many invertebrates rely on these wetlands up and down the Paroo River.

Of the seven different types of wetland identified in the Paroo and Warrego River catchments, Nocoleche Nature Reserve has claypans, river channels and waterholes, Eleocharis swamps, lignum swamps and black box swamps. It does not have large freshwater lakes or salt lakes.

Nocoleche Nature Reserve is the only known location in New South Wales of Aponogeton sp. aff. Queenslandicus and the endangered Dentella minutissima.

== Heritage ==
To date only seven Aboriginal sites have been formally recorded from Nocoleche Nature Reserve. European buildings that remain include the shearers’ quarters, cooks’ quarters, shearing overseer's cottage, store room, shower room/block, and toilet block.

== See also ==
- Nocoleche

== Gallery ==
These photographs were taken in February 2023 after several good seasons and major rains in the catchment in November 2022.

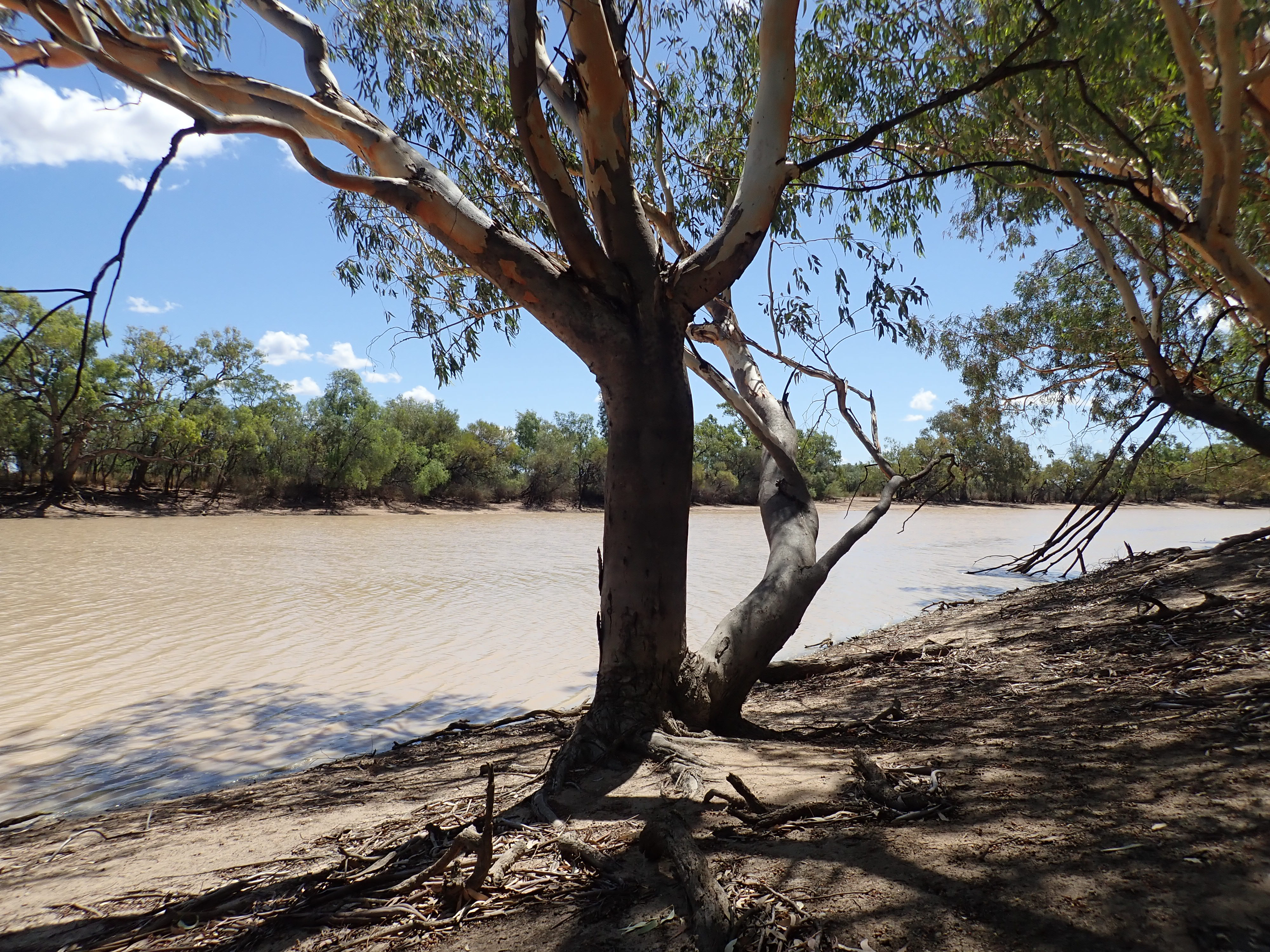
King Charlie Waterhole

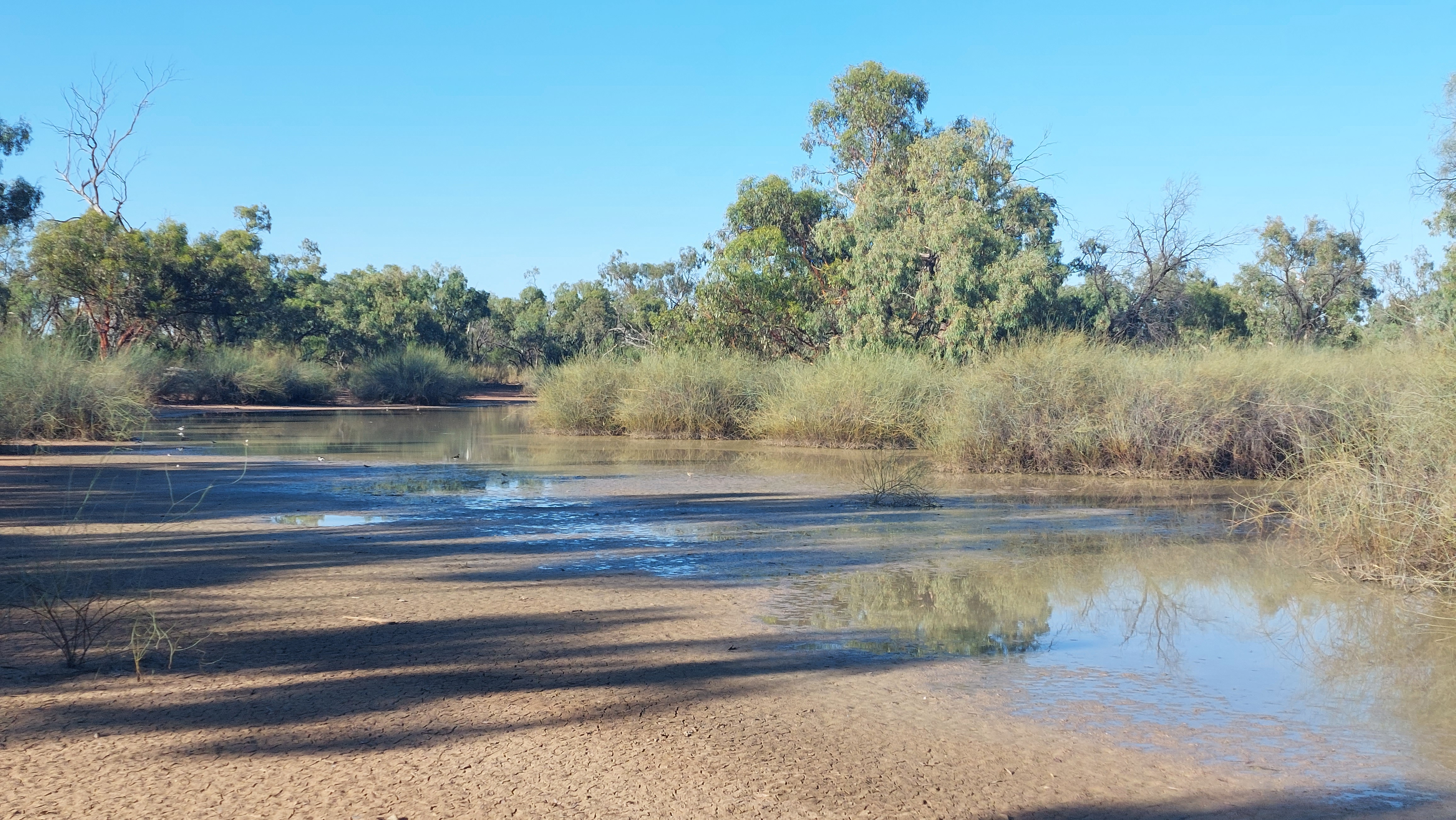
A Lignum Swamp

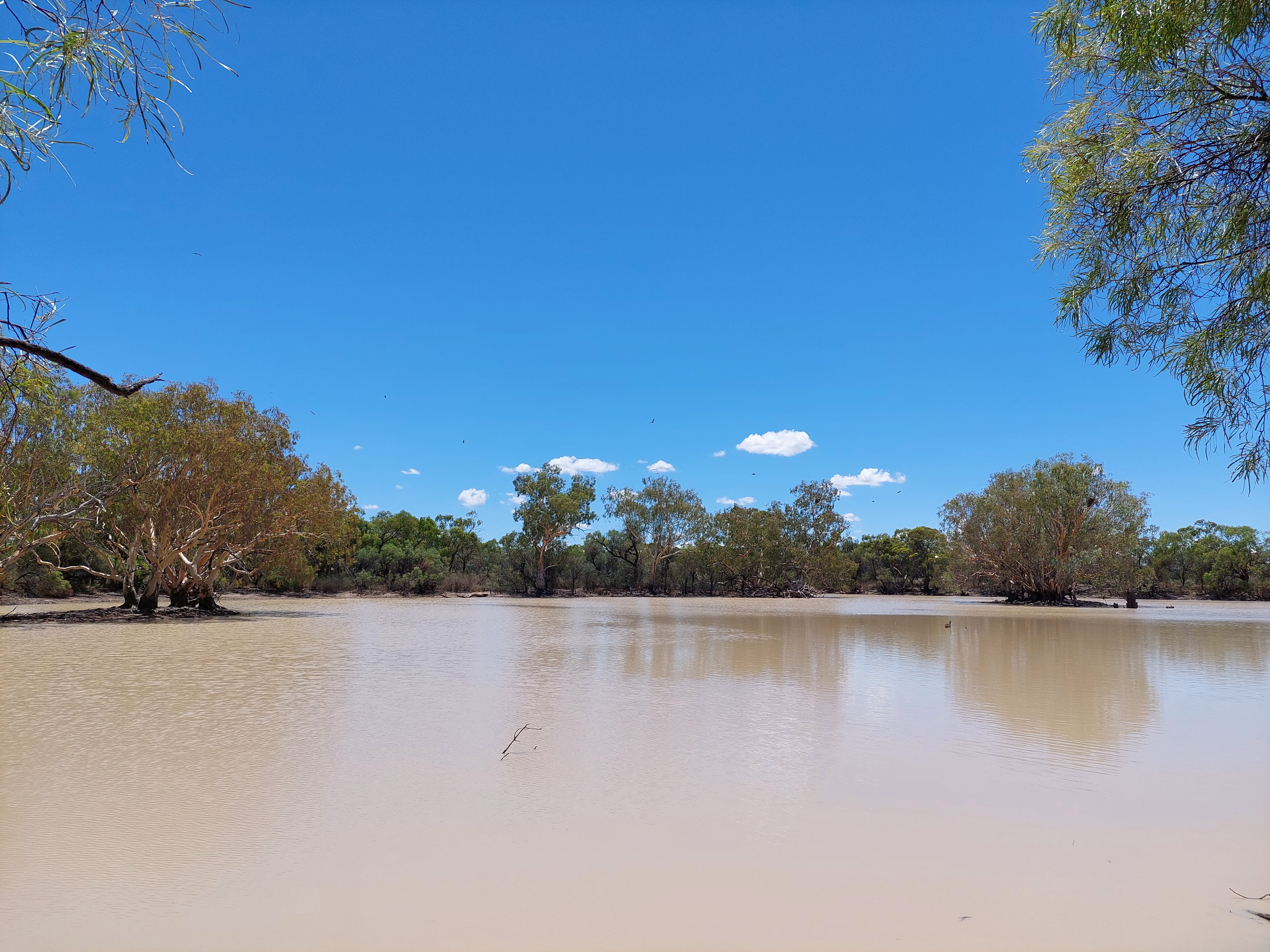
Cuttaburra Channel

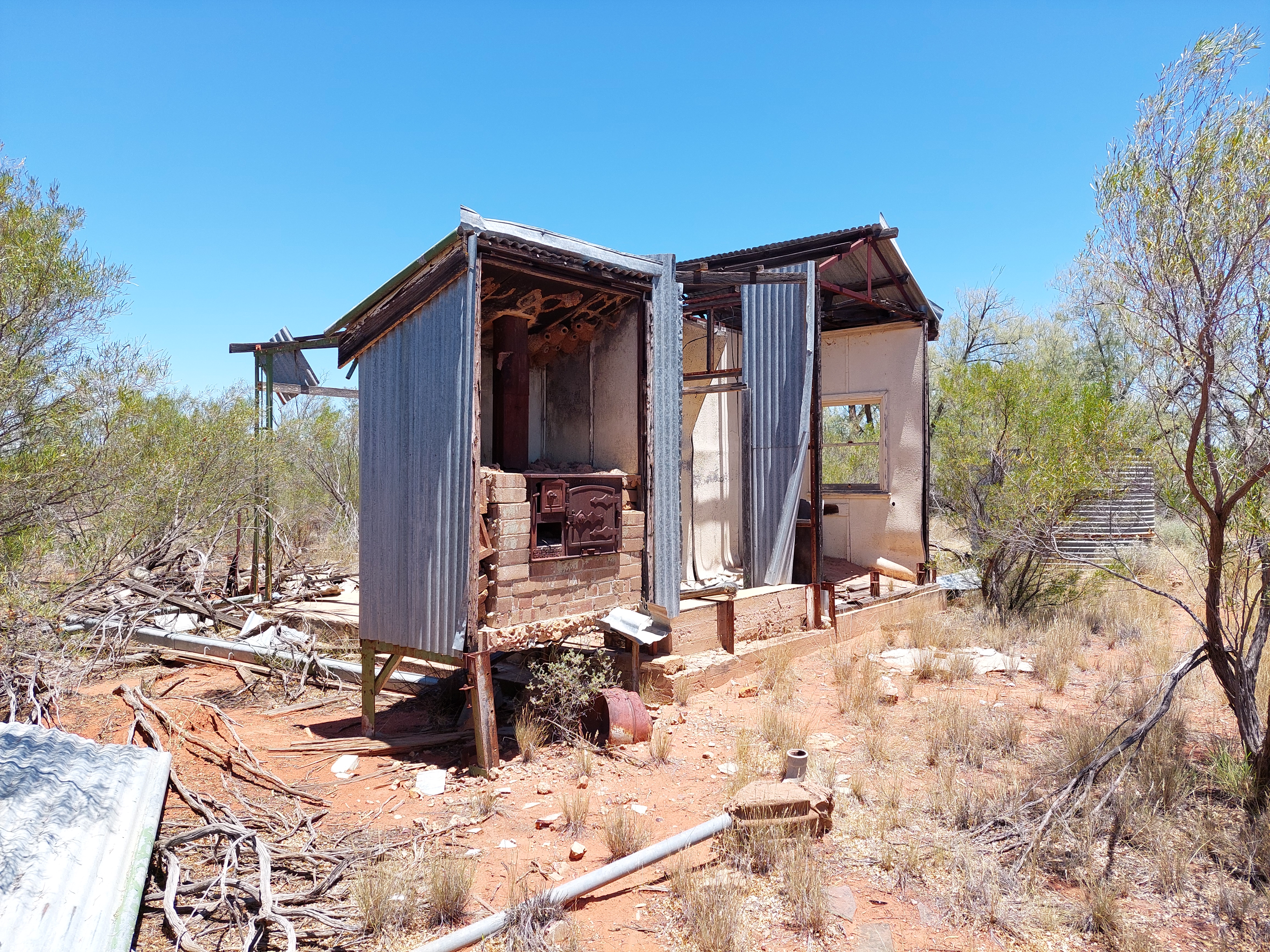
Corallia outstation remains

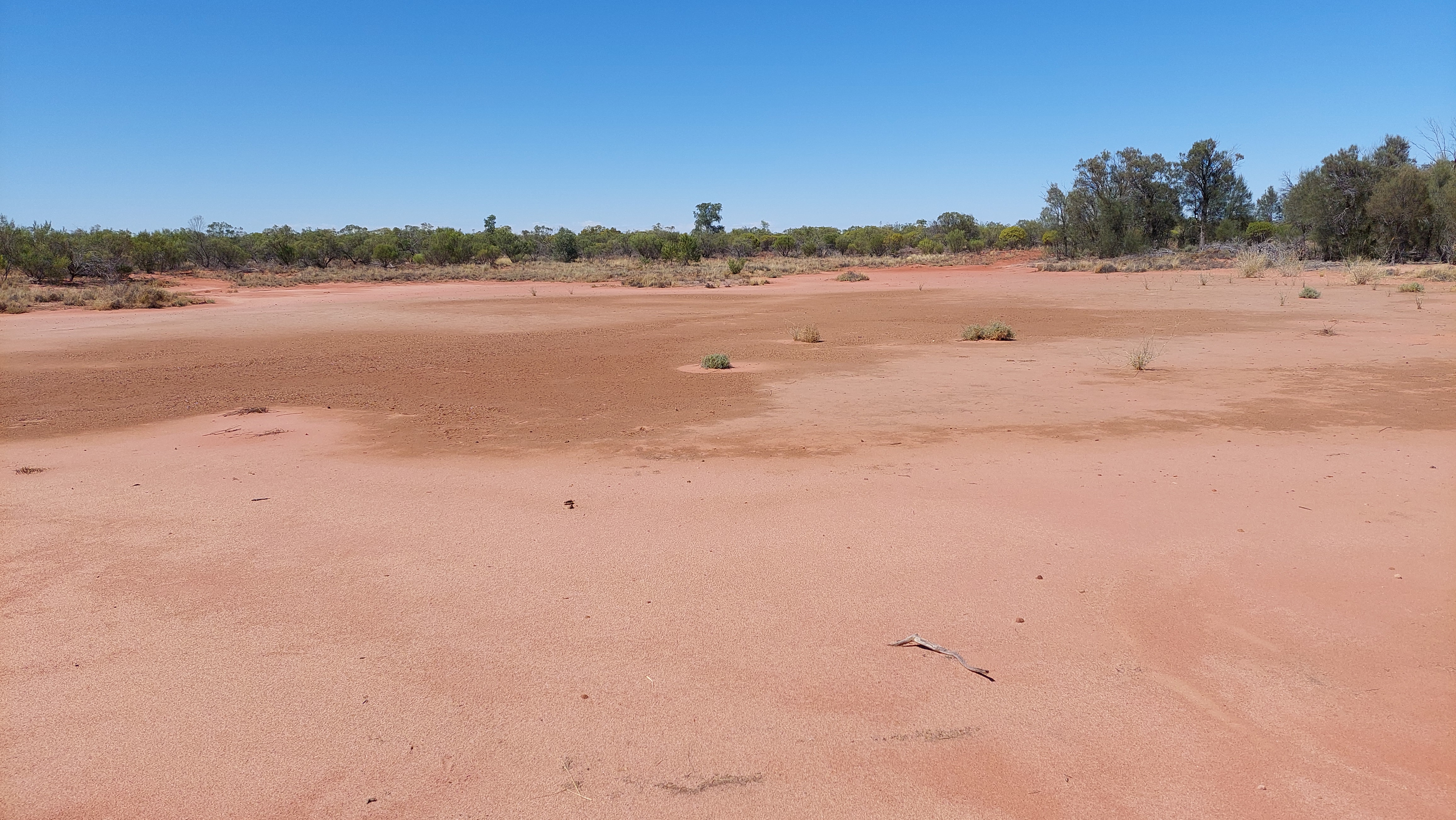
Claypan with small catchment

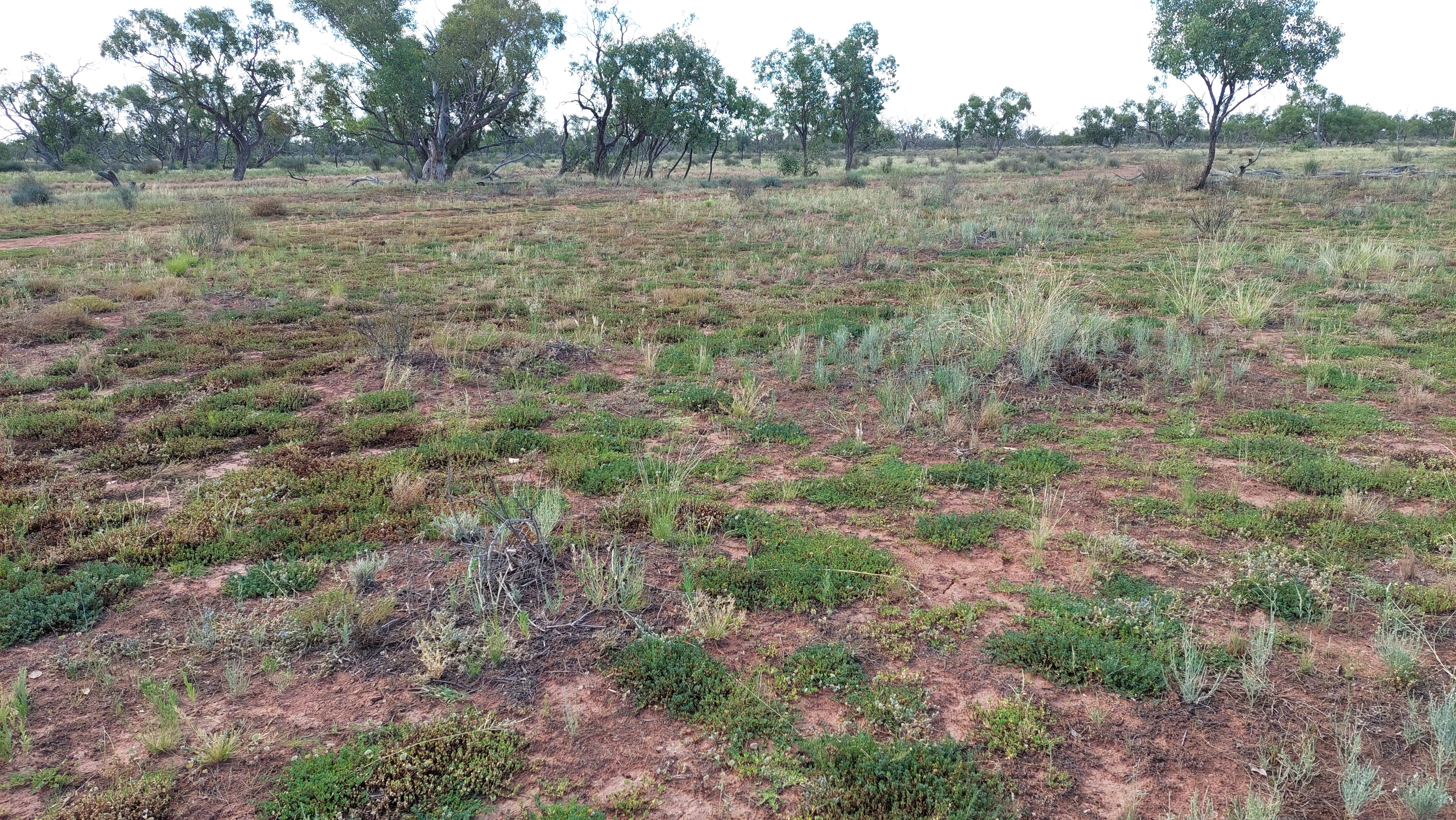
Claypan with large catchment

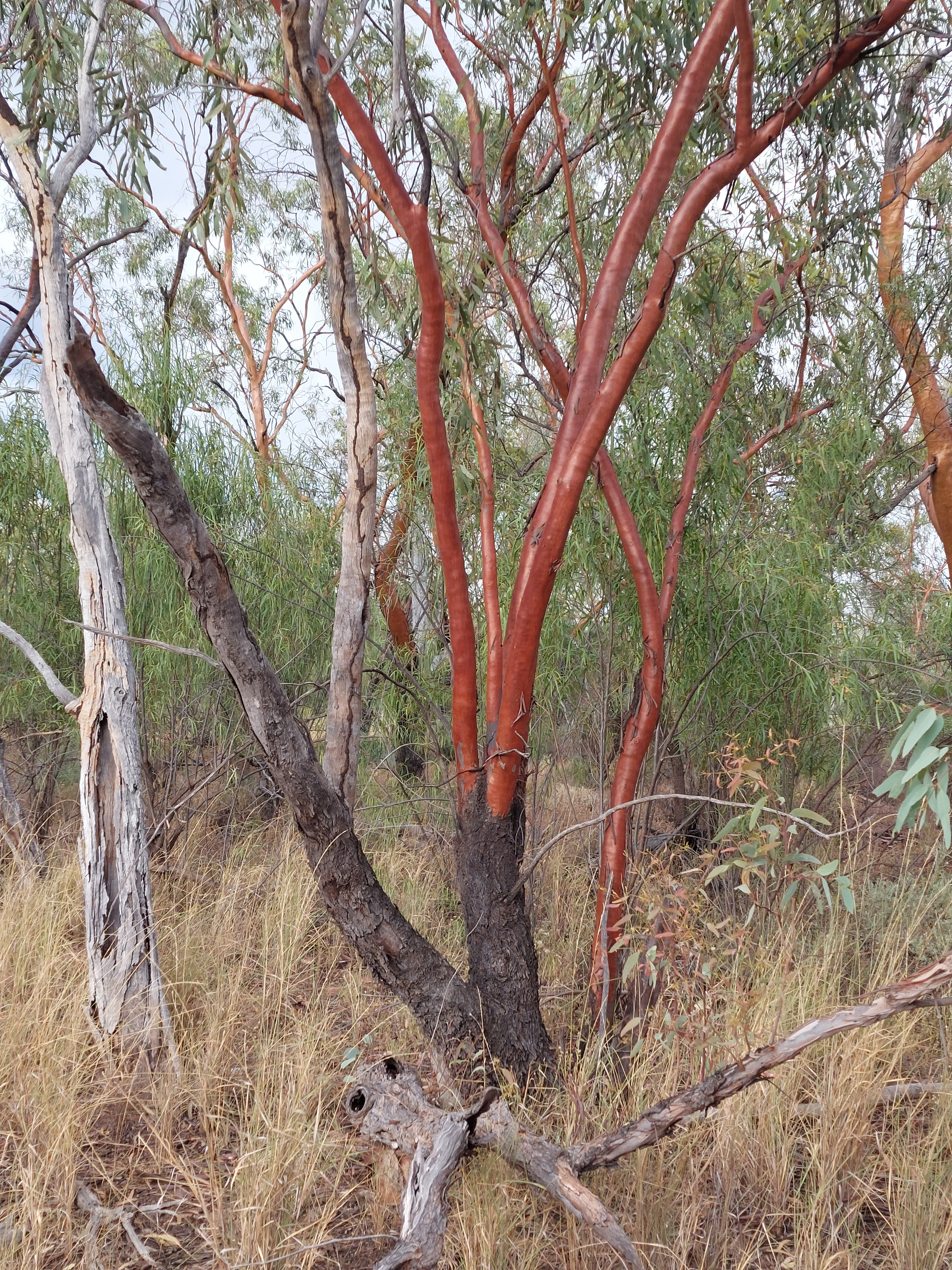
Eucalyptus ochrophloia - yapunyah

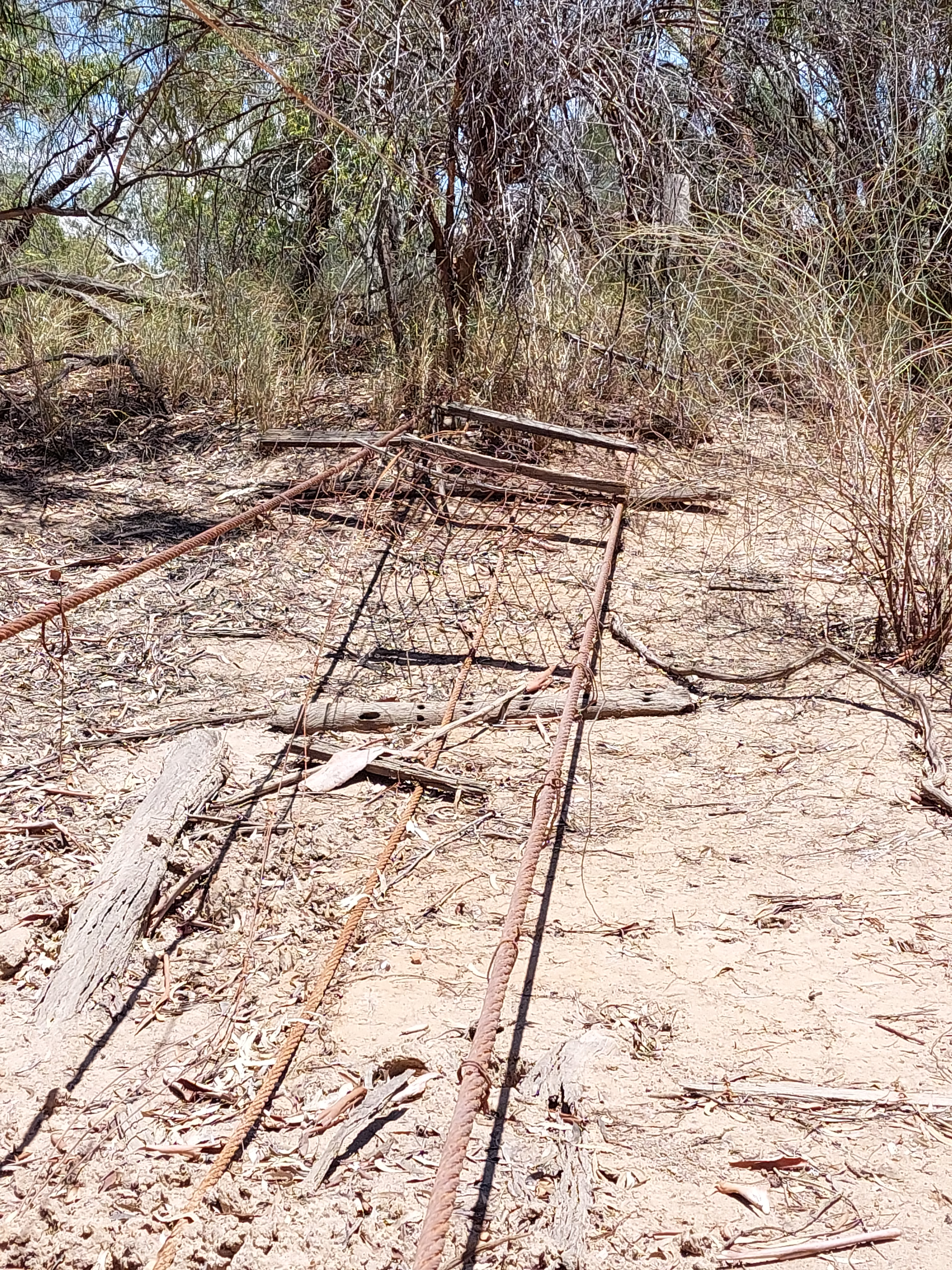
Remains of suspension bridge built in 1929

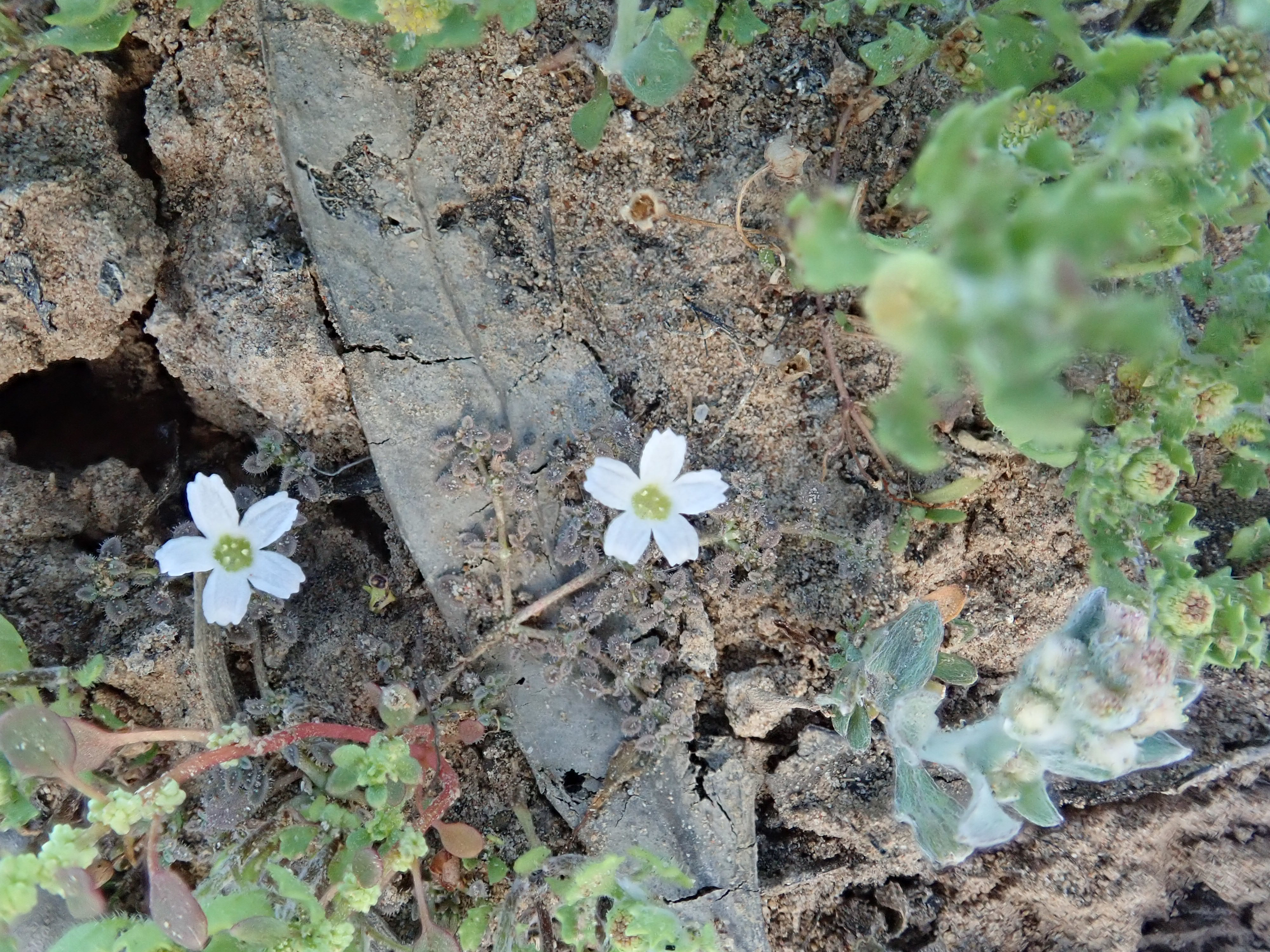
Dentella minutissima

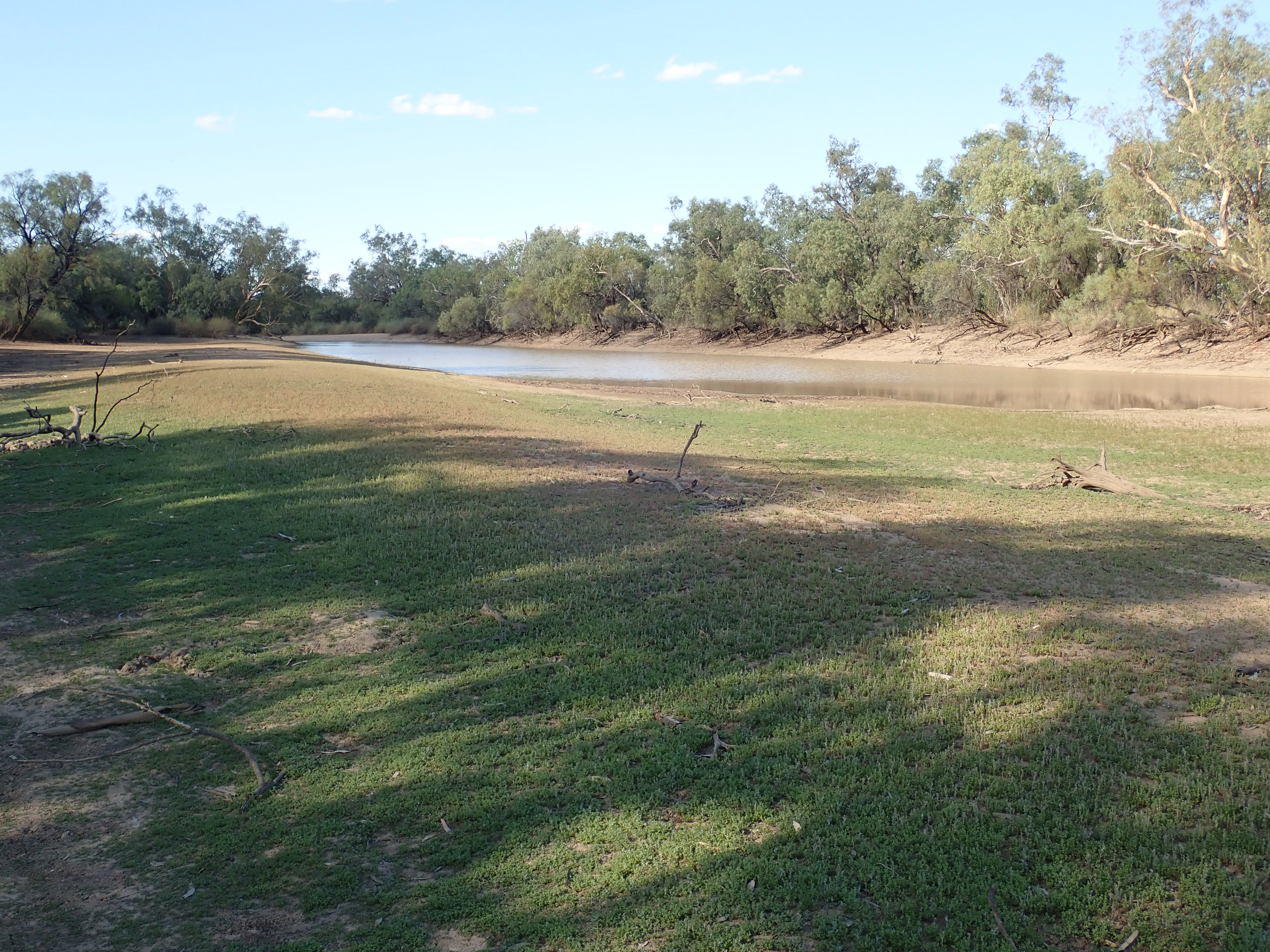
Habitat of Dentella minutissima

== Sources ==
- "Nocoleche Nature Reserve Plan of Management". NSW Environment & Heritage. January 2000. Material was copied from this source, which is available under a Creative Commons Attribution 4.0 International License.
