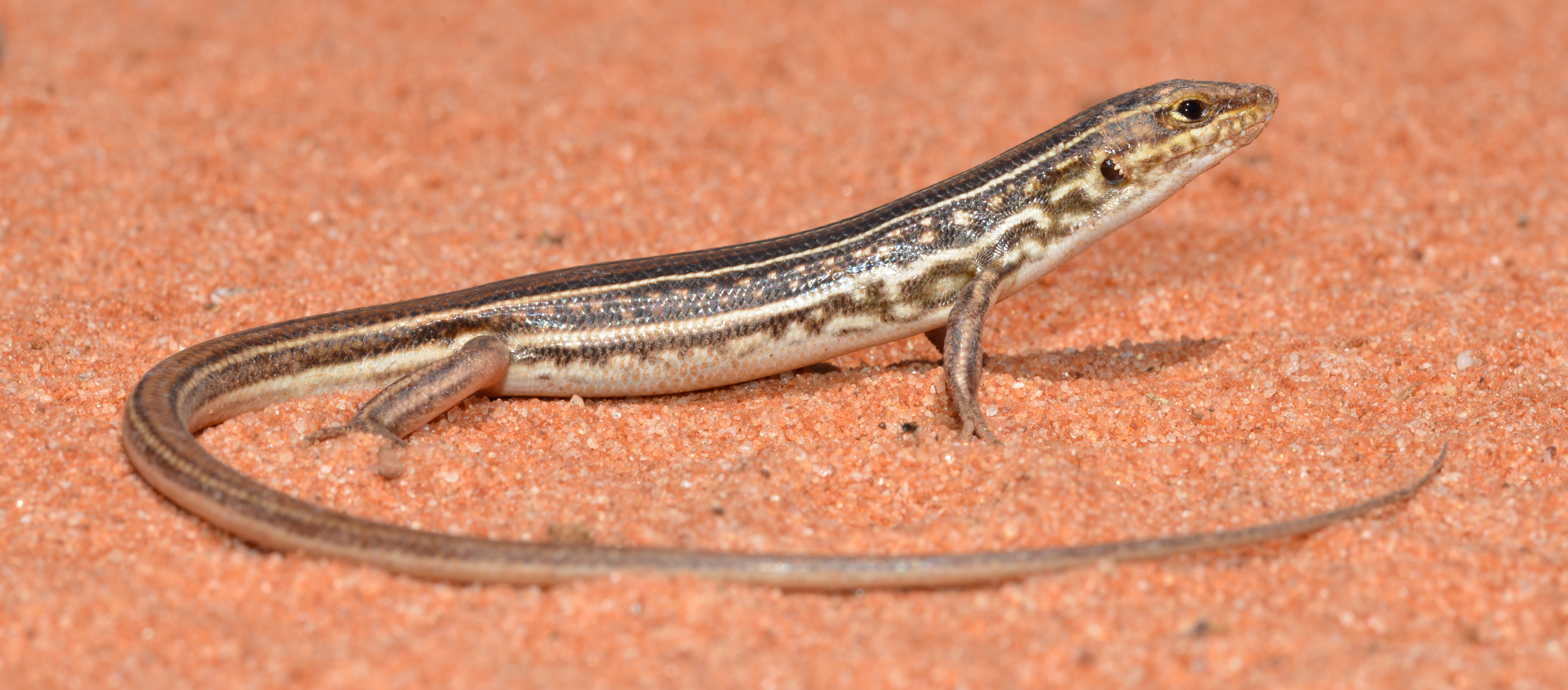

Conservation status
- Least Concern (IUCN 3.1)

Scientific classification
- Kingdom: Animalia
- Phylum: Chordata
- Class: Reptilia
- Order: Squamata
- Suborder: Scinciformata
- Infraorder: Scincomorpha
- Family: Sphenomorphidae
- Genus: Ctenotus
- Species: C. regius

Binomial name
- Ctenotus regius Storr, 1971

= Ctenotus regius =

Species of lizard

Ctenotus regius, the pale-rumped ctenotus or regal striped skink, is a medium-sized species of skink with an arid distribution restricted to the Australian Mainland, which belongs to the largest group of reptiles in Australia, Ctentotus (containing close to 100 species).

== Description ==
Ctentotus regius is a medium-sized skink, characterised by its longitudinally striped back and white spotted sides. The species has a reddish-brown tail and its body is patterned by a blackish brown colour with a white-cream lateral stripe that runs from over the ear to below the eye, and white side spots in between the longitudinal lines that span the length of its body. The average snout-to-vent length of the species is 7.2 cm with females being recorded as slightly larger, on average, than their male counterparts.

== Taxonomy ==
Ctenotus regius was first described by Glen Milton Store in 1970, and has not since had a name revision.

The pale-rumped ctenotus is a member of the skink family (Scincidae), and the genus Ctenotus, often described as 'comb-eared' for its row of small scales on the anterior edge of its ears. Many of the species within this genus are exceedingly similar in shape, build and appearance, with many differences only identifiable in their size and foraging and sheltering behaviours.

== Distribution ==
Ctentotus regius is endemic to Australia, with a distribution isolated to the in north-west of New South Wales, the south-west of Queensland, the south-east of Northern Territory, the north-east of South Australia and the north-west of Victoria. Atlas of Living Australia currently holds 7,697 records for the species across Australia, although some of these may be misidentifications. Records for the species exist in a number of National Parks and Nature Reserves within New South Wales, including Mallee Cliffs NP, Tarawi NR, Mungo NP, Sturt NP, Kinchega NP, Nocoleche NR and Yathong NR.

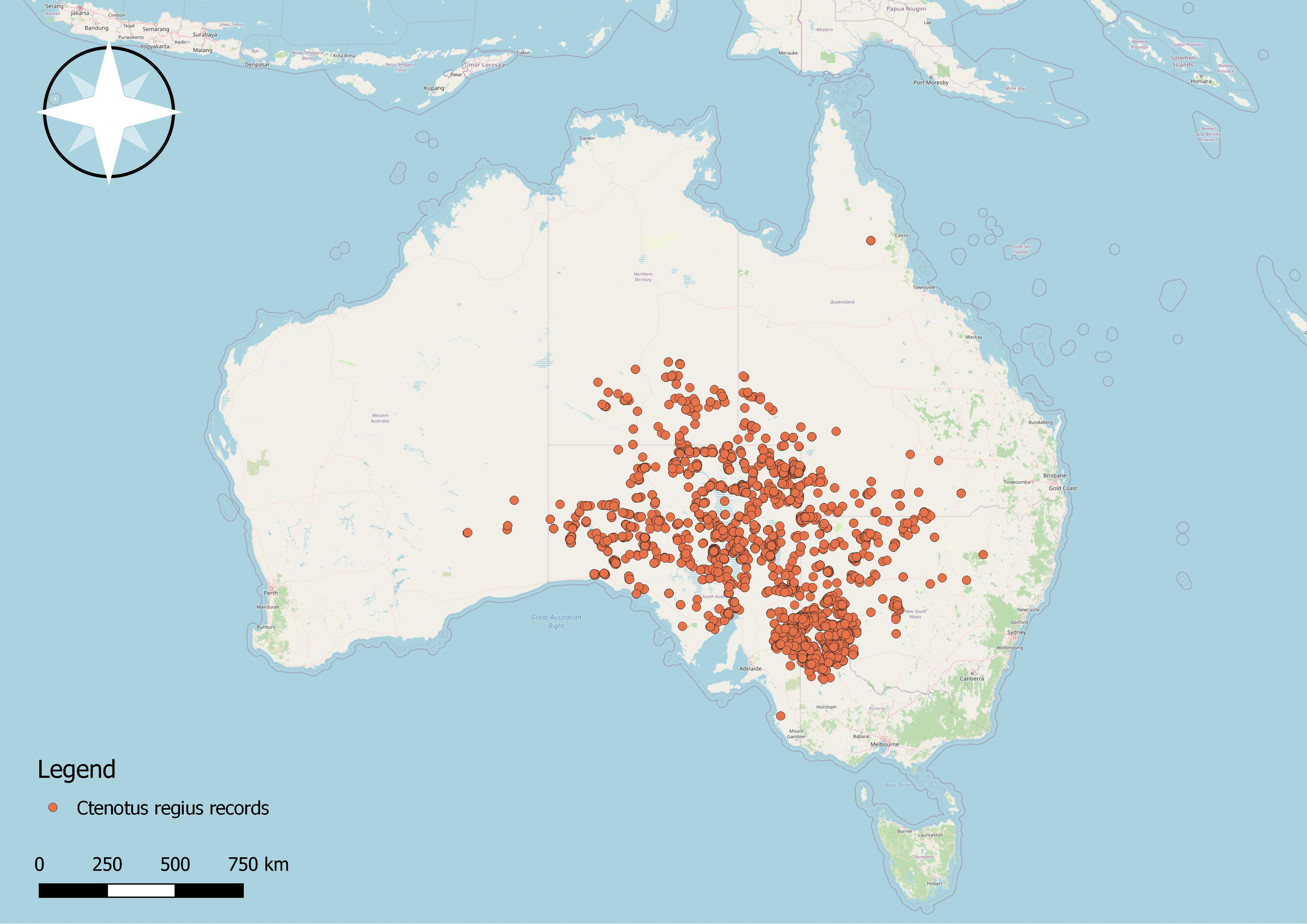
Australian Distribution of Ctenotus regius (Source: Atlas of Living Australia, Google Street Maps)

== Ecology and habitat ==
The pale-rumped ctenotus inhabits sandy and loamy deserts in central Australia, seeking refuge in low shrubs including saltbush (Atriplex spp.), bluebush (Maireana spp.) and nitre bush (Nitraria billardierei).

Although much is still unknown about the species' ecological ties to its predators and prey, grey butcherbirds (Cracticus torquatus) have been observed preying upon the species in Murray-Sunset National Park in Victoria.

The species has been observed to occupy a home range, with estimates ranging from 40-60 square metres.

== Reproduction and lifecycle ==
The pale-rumped ctenotus is an oviparous (egg-laying) species. Females are on average larger than their male counterparts and lay a clutch of approximately two eggs early in summer, although reproductive efforts have been noted to vary considerably with environmental conditions. The pale-rumped ctenotus has a relatively short lifespan of approximately 3 years, in contrast to other Ctenotus species such as C. leonhardii with specimens recorded as living for as long as 7 years.

== Diet ==
Ctentotus regius is largely an unspecialised insectivore, although it may occasionally consume plant material.

== Conservation ==
Ctenotus regius is listed as a species of least concern on the IUCN Red List. However, many pressures impact desert reptile populations within Australia, including habitat loss from land clearing, habitat degradation and modification as a result of introduced pest species and anthropogenic climate change, vehicle collisions and emerging diseases.
