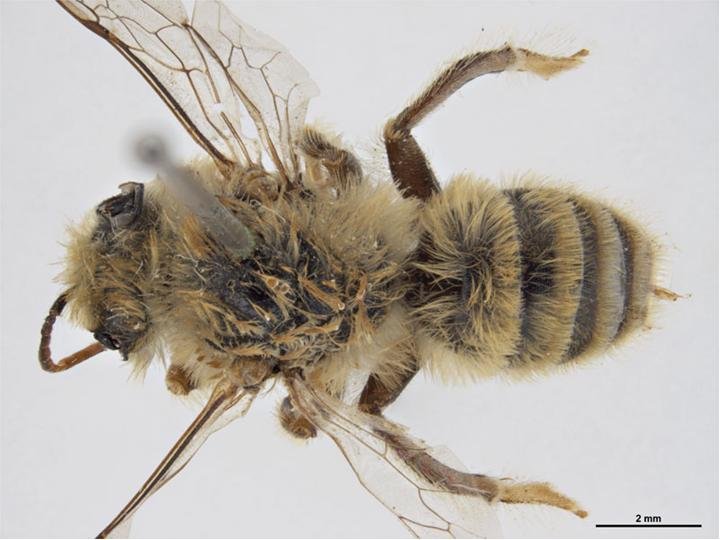
- Male

Scientific classification
- Kingdom: Animalia
- Phylum: Arthropoda
- Clade: Pancrustacea
- Class: Insecta
- Order: Hymenoptera
- Family: Colletidae
- Genus: Leioproctus
- Species: L. abdominalis

Binomial name
- Leioproctus abdominalis (Smith, 1879)

Synonyms
- Paracolletes abdominalis Smith, 1879; Goniocolletes morsus Cockerell, 1907; Goniocolletes pallidus Cockerell, 1915; Dasycolletes curvipes Friese, 1924; Dasycolletes rufiventris Friese, 1924; Goniocolletes simillimus Rayment, 1935; Goniocolletes proximus Rayment, 1935; Leioproctus (Goniocolletes) ruficaudus Michener, 1965; Leioproctus (Goniocolletes) similior Michener, 1965

= Leioproctus abdominalis =

Species of bee

Leioproctus abdominalis, or Leioproctus (Goniocolletes) abdominalis, is a species of bee in the family Colletidae and subfamily Colletinae. It is endemic to Australia. It was described by English entomologist Frederick Smith in 1879.

== Distribution and habitat ==
The species occurs across much of mainland Australia. Type localities include Swan River and Geraldton in Western Australia, Hermannsburg in the Northern Territory, Adelaide in South Australia and Wentworth in New South Wales.

== Behaviour ==
The adults are flying mellivores. Flowering plants visited by the bees include Eucalyptus largiflorens.

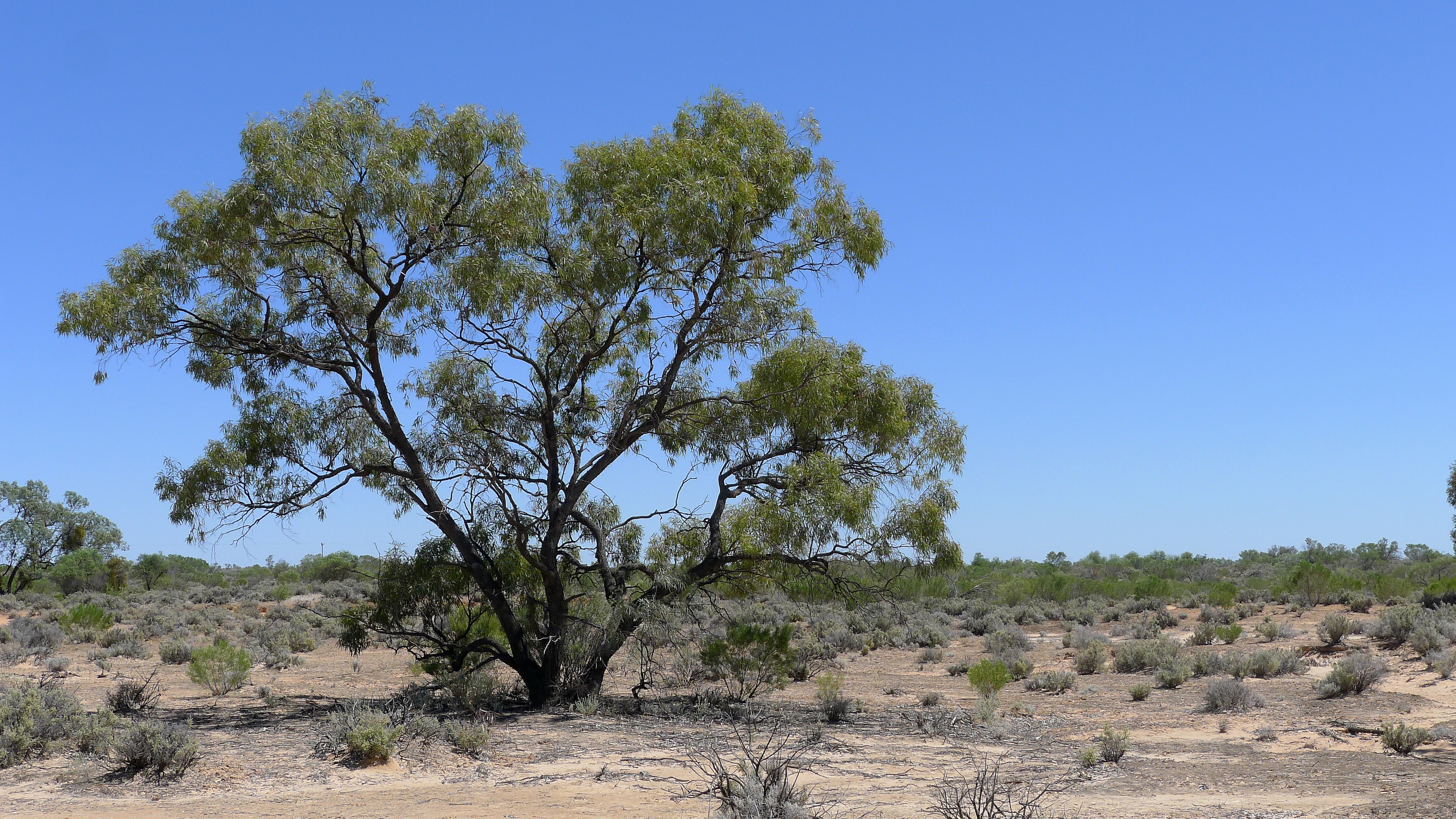
Eucalyptus largiflorens (Black Box), a forage plant of the bees

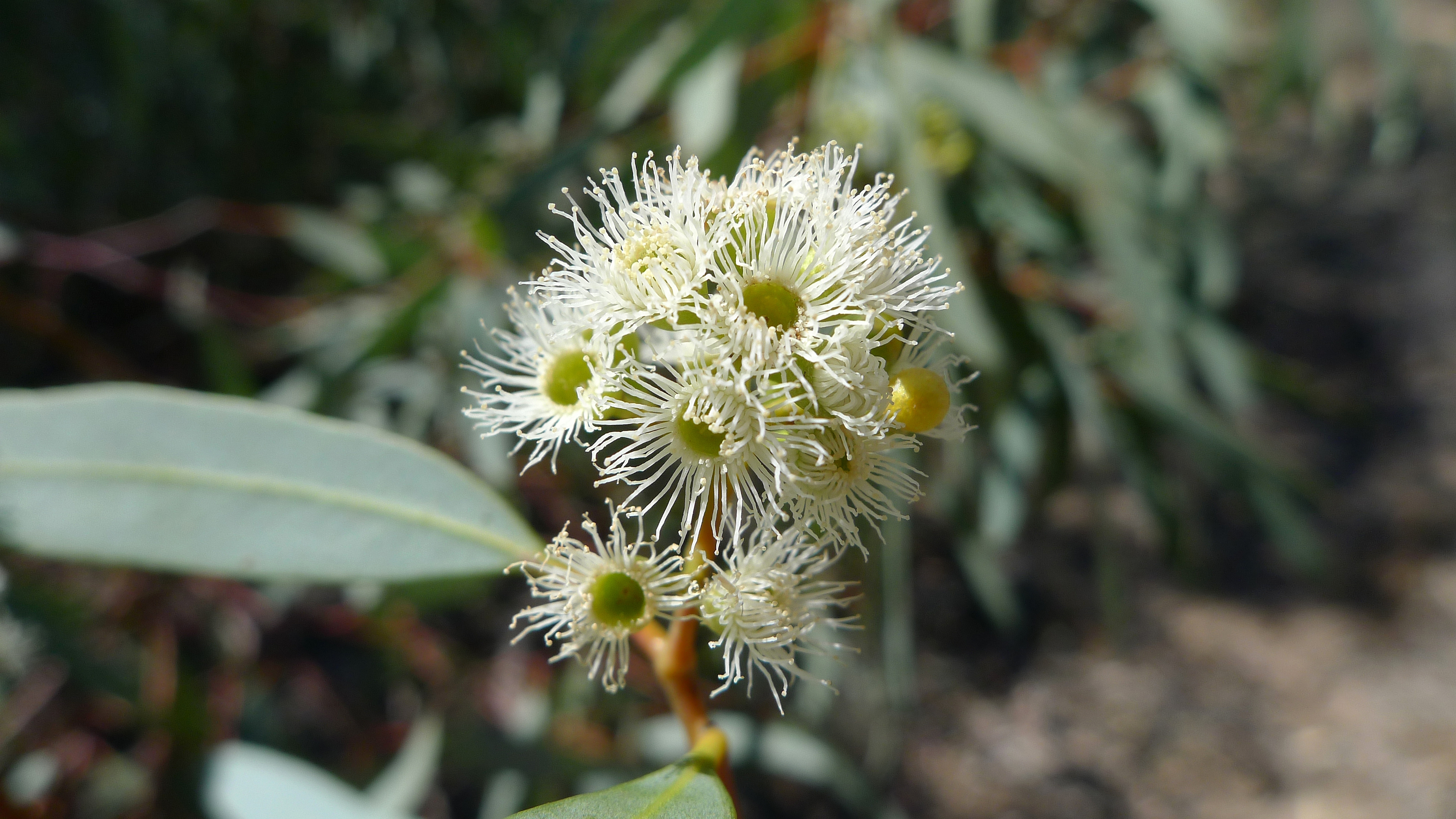
Eucalyptus largiflorens flowers
