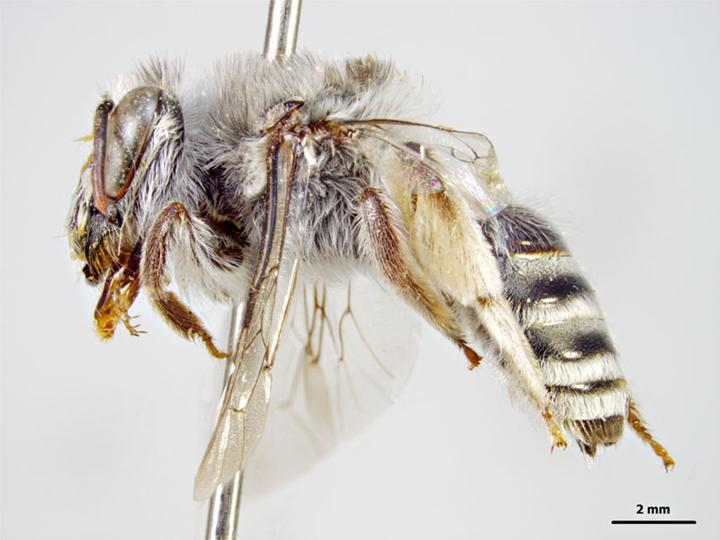
- Female

Scientific classification
- Kingdom: Animalia
- Phylum: Arthropoda
- Clade: Pancrustacea
- Class: Insecta
- Order: Hymenoptera
- Family: Colletidae
- Genus: Leioproctus
- Species: L. perfasciatus

Binomial name
- Leioproctus perfasciatus (Cockerell, 1906)

Synonyms
- Paracolletes perfasciatus Cockerell, 1906

= Leioproctus perfasciatus =

Species of bee

Leioproctus perfasciatus, or Leioproctus (Goniocolletes) perfasciatus, is a species of bee in the family Colletidae and subfamily Colletinae. It is endemic to Australia. It was described by British-American entomologist Theodore Dru Alison Cockerell in 1906.

== Distribution and habitat ==
The species occurs across much of mainland Australia, including mallee habitat.

== Behaviour ==
The adults are flying mellivores. Flowering plants visited by the bees include Angophora floribunda and Eucalyptus largiflorens.

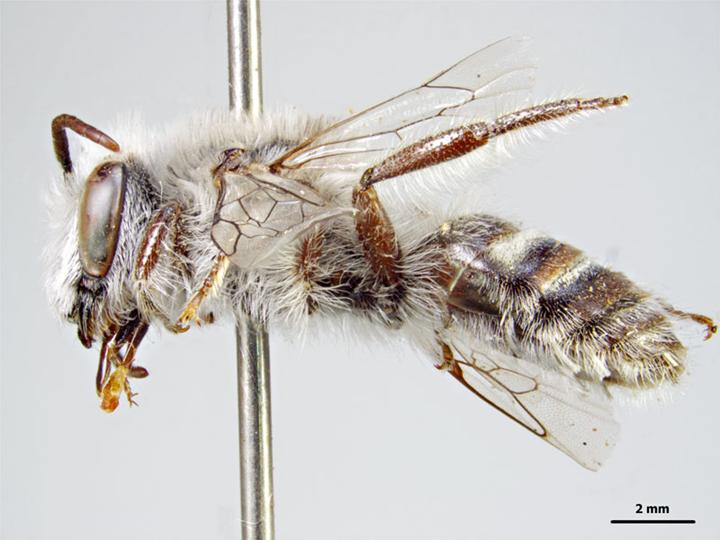
Male
