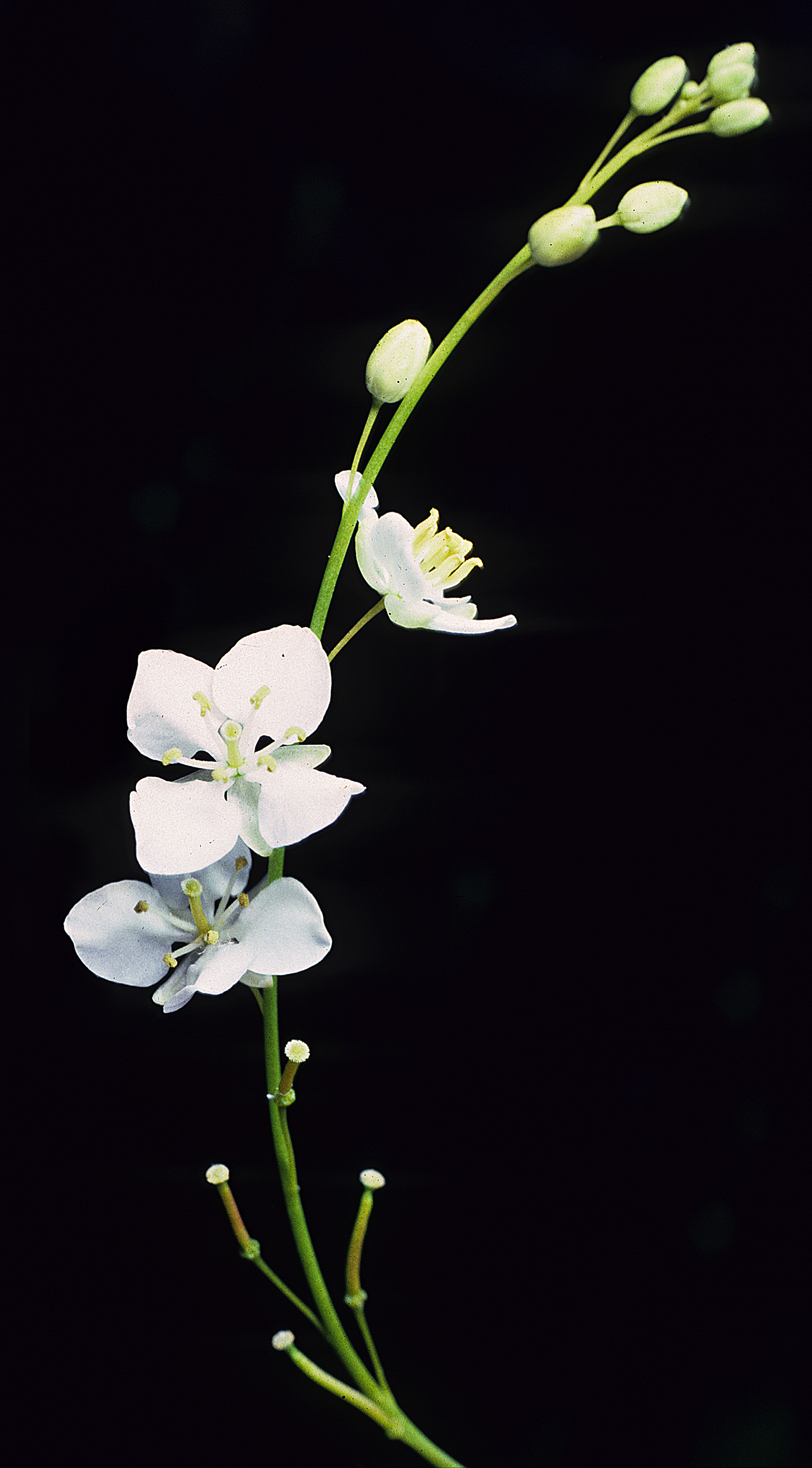
- Arabidella trisecta

Scientific classification
- Kingdom: Plantae
- Clade: Tracheophytes
- Clade: Angiosperms
- Clade: Eudicots
- Clade: Rosids
- Order: Brassicales
- Family: Brassicaceae
- Genus: Arabidella (F.Muell.) O.E.Schulz

Type species
- Arabidella trisecta (F.Muell.) O.E.Schulz

= Arabidella =

Genus of flowering plants

Arabidella is a genus of flowering plants belonging to the family Brassicaceae. It was first described in 1853 by Ferdinand von Mueller as a subgenus of Erysimum (in the family Cruciferae - now Brassicaceae) to give the name, Erysimum subg. Arabidella, but was elevated to genus status by Otto Eugen Schulz in 1924. The type species is Arabidella trisecta.

A molecular study in 2022 redescribed the genus and differentiated it from Lemphoria, describing Arabidella species as being shrubs or subshrubs, and rarely annual herbs, and having lower leaves divided into 2-3 linear to filiform lobes; having confluent nectar glands together with median glands, having 20-90 ovules 20–90 per ovary and having linear fruits. Species in the Lemphoria genus are annual herbs whose lower leaves are essentially pinnate, with lateral nectar glands and no median glands, and having 6-70 ovules per ovary and oblong fruits.

Its native range is Australia, and is found throughout the mainland ("endemic in the semi-arid regions of Australia").

== Species ==
Species given by Plants of the World Online (March 2021)

- Arabidella chrysodema Lepschi & Wege
- Arabidella eremigena (F.Muell.) E.A.Shaw
- Arabidella filifolia (F.Muell.) E.A.Shaw
- Arabidella glaucescens E.A.Shaw
- Arabidella nasturtium (F.Muell.) E.A.Shaw
- Arabidella procumbens (Tate) E.A.Shaw
- Arabidella trisecta (F.Muell.) O.E.Schulz

Species after phylogenetic studies in 2022 where the genera Lemphoria and Arabidella are recircumscribed:

- Arabidella nasturtium
- Arabidella filifolia
- Arabidella. glaucescens
- Arabidella trisecta
