= Leioproctus colletellus =

Scientific classification
- Kingdom: Animalia
- Phylum: Arthropoda
- Clade: Pancrustacea
- Class: Insecta
- Order: Hymenoptera
- Family: Colletidae
- Genus: Leioproctus
- Species: L. colletellus

Binomial name
- Leioproctus colletellus (Cockerell, 1905)

Synonyms
- Paracolletes colletellus Cockerell, 1905

Species of bee

Leioproctus colletellus, or Leioproctus (Goniocolletes) colletellus, is a species of bee in the family Colletidae and subfamily Colletinae. It is endemic to Australia. It was described by British-American entomologist Theodore Dru Alison Cockerell in 1905.

== Distribution and habitat ==
The species occurs across mainland Australia. The type locality is Adelaide River, Northern Territory.

== Behaviour ==
The adults are flying mellivores. Flowering plants visited by the bees include Angophora floribunda, Eucalyptus camaldulensis and Eucalyptus largiflorens.

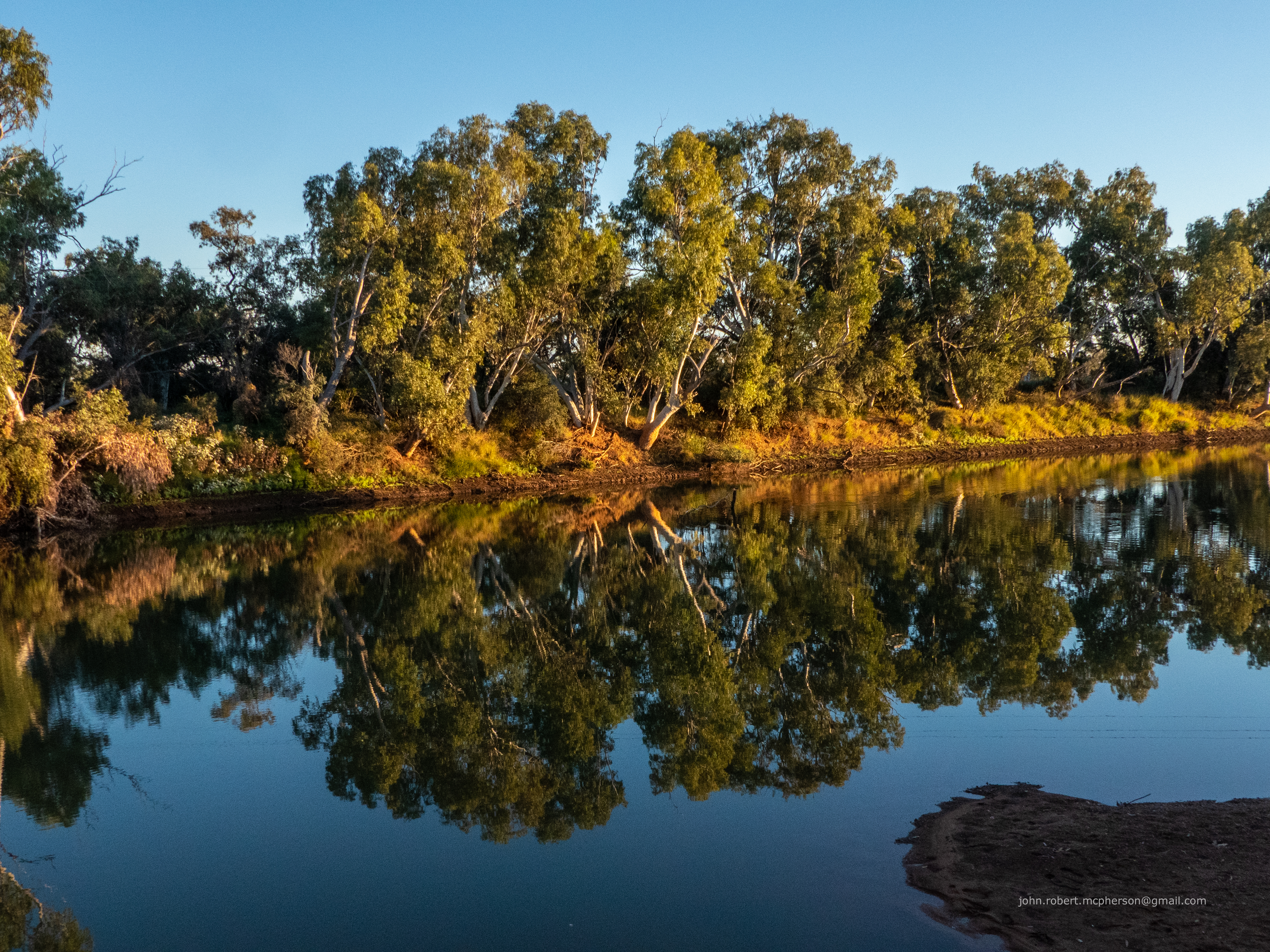
Eucalyptus camaldulensis (river red gums), a forage plant of the bees
