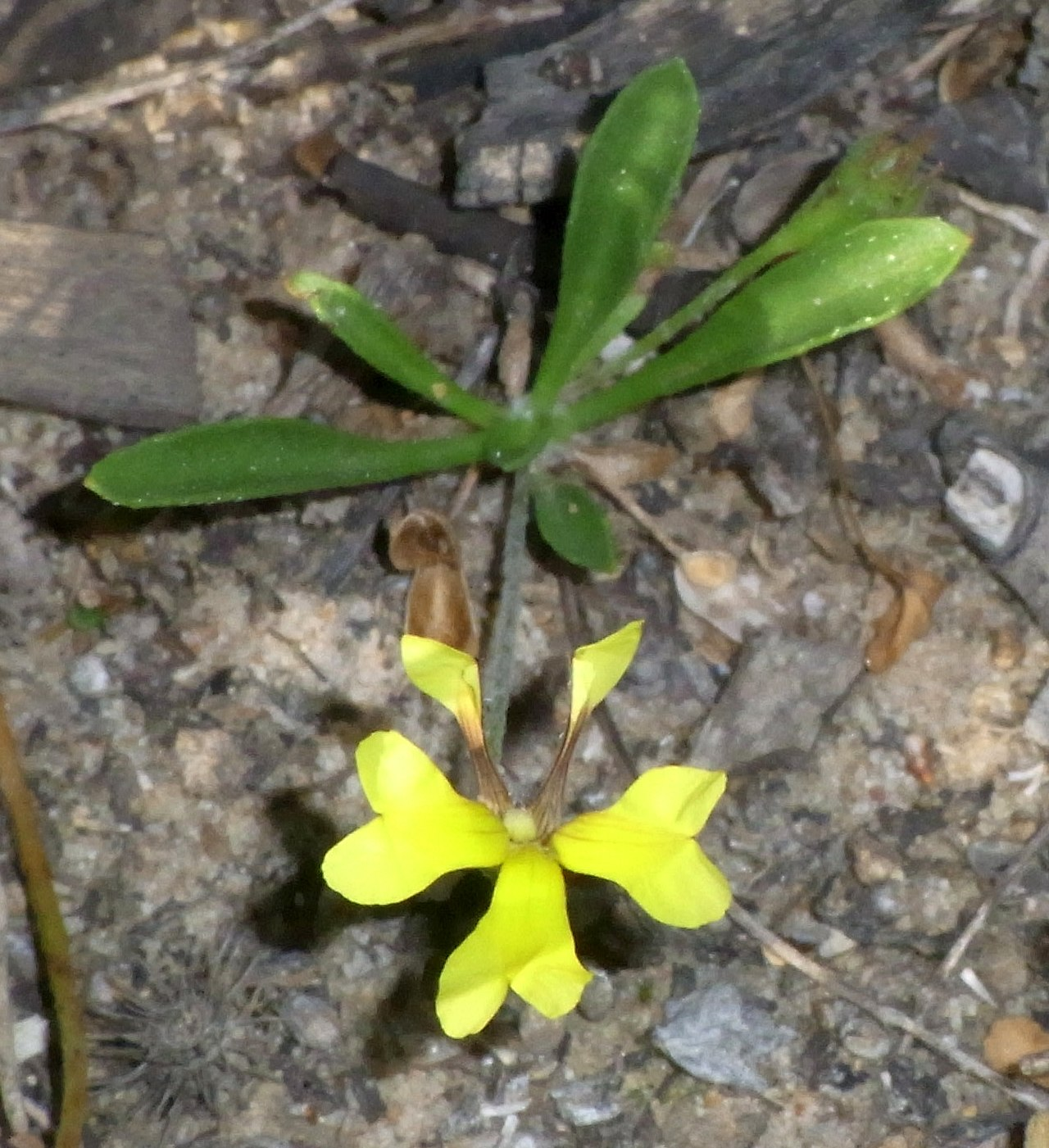
- Goodenia heteromera in north-western Victoria

Scientific classification
- Kingdom: Plantae
- Clade: Tracheophytes
- Clade: Angiosperms
- Clade: Eudicots
- Clade: Asterids
- Order: Asterales
- Family: Goodeniaceae
- Genus: Goodenia
- Species: G. heteromera

Binomial name
- Goodenia heteromera F.Muell.

= Goodenia heteromera =

Spreading goodenia

Species of plant

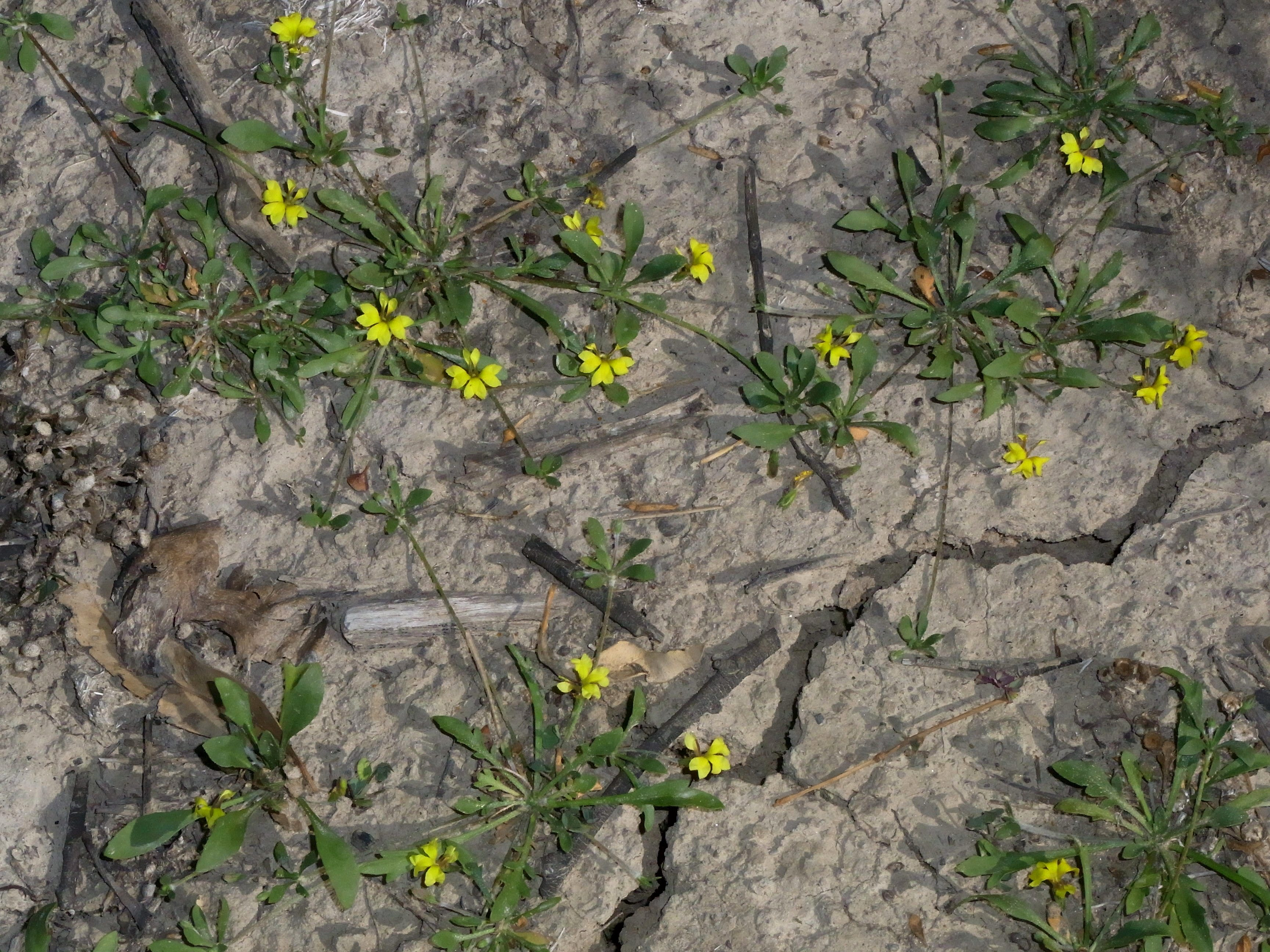
Habit

Goodenia heteromera, commonly known as spreading goodenia or fan flower, is a species of flowering plant in the family Goodeniaceae and is endemic to south-eastern Australia. It is a perennial or annual, stolon-forming herb with lance-shaped to egg-shaped leaves with the narrow end towards the base, and racemes of yellow flowers with brownish markings.

== Description ==
Goodenia heteromera is a perennial or annual herb up to 20 cm (7.9 in) tall, with its stems forming stolons. The leaves are mostly arranged in tufts on the stolons and are egg-shaped to lance-shaped with the narrower end towards the base, densely hairy, 10–100 mm (0.39–3.94 in) long and 3–10 mm (0.12–0.39 in) wide, sometimes with teeth on the edges. The flowers are arranged singly or in very short umbels, the individual flowers on a pedicel 10–60 mm (0.39–2.36 in) long. The sepals are lance-shaped, 2–3 mm (0.079–0.118 in) long, the corolla yellow with brownish markings, 6–11 mm (0.24–0.43 in) long. The lower lobes of the corolla are 4–5 mm (0.16–0.20 in) long with wings about 2 mm (0.079 in) wide. Flowering occurs from May to November and the fruit is an oval capsule 6–7 mm (0.24–0.28 in) long. The species is distinctive in having spreading upper corolla labes.

== Taxonomy and naming ==
Goodenia heteromera was first formally described in 1859 by Ferdinand von Mueller in Fragmenta Phytographiae Australiae. The specific epithet (heteromera) means "unequal-parts".

== Distribution and habitat ==
This goodenia grows in heavy soil in Eucalyptus camaldulensis and E. largiflorens woodland in the Murray–Darling basin in Queensland, New South Wales, Victoria and South Australia.

== Conservation status ==
Goodenia heteromera is classified as of "least concern" under the Queensland Government Nature Conservation Act 1992.
