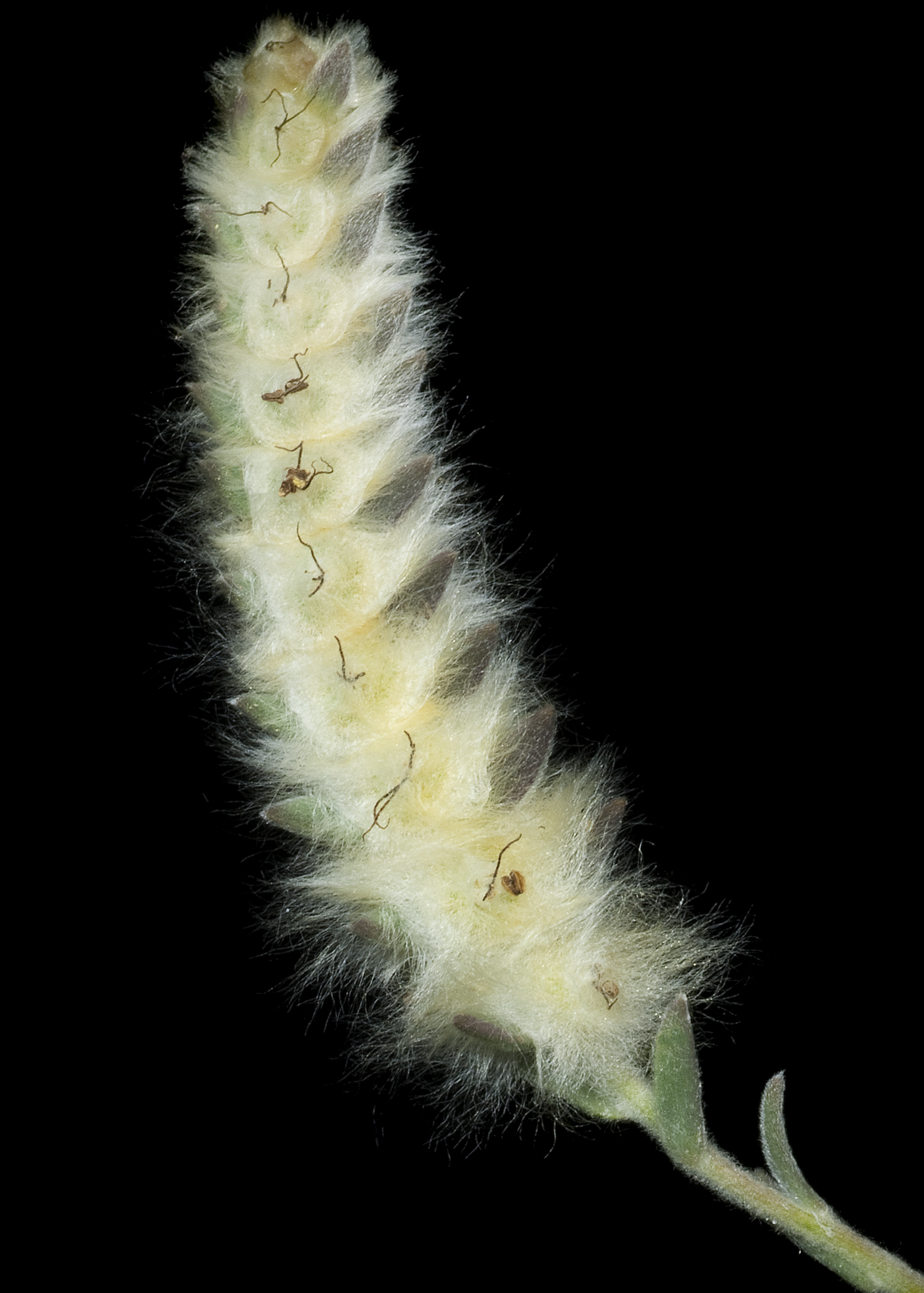

Scientific classification
- Kingdom: Plantae
- Clade: Tracheophytes
- Clade: Angiosperms
- Clade: Eudicots
- Order: Caryophyllales
- Family: Amaranthaceae
- Genus: Maireana
- Species: M. carnosa

Binomial name
- Maireana carnosa (Moq.) Paul G.Wilson

Synonyms
- List: Bassia carnosa (Moq.) F.Muell.; Bassia lanuginosa C.T.White; Chenolea carnosa Benth.; Echinopsilon carnosus Moq.; Kochia carnosa (Moq.) R.H.Anderson; Trichinium carnosum Moq. ex Benth.

= Maireana carnosa =

Species of plant in the amaranth family

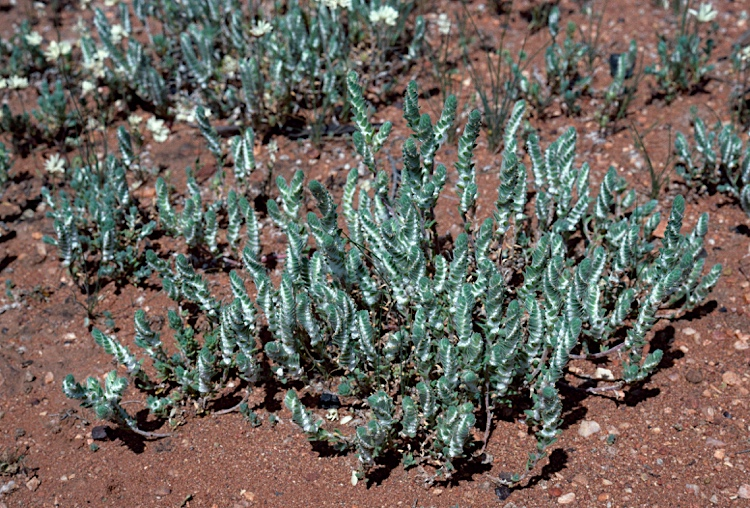
Habit near Mullewa

Maireana carnosa, commonly known as cottony bluebush, is a species of flowering plant in the family Amaranthaceae and is endemic to continental Australia. It is an erect to spreading or prostrate perennial herb or subshrub with a woody base, fleshy narrowly to broadly oblong leaves, bisexual flowers arranged singly, and a crust-like, hemispherical fruiting perianth with a thin, horizontal wing.

== Description ==
Maireana carnosa is an erect to spreading or prostrate perennial herb or subshrub that typically grows to a height of 30 cm (12 in) and has a woody base. Its leaves are narrowly to broadly oblong or broadly elliptic to lance-shaped, 4–12 mm (0.16–0.47 in) long, 1.5–3.5 mm (0.059–0.138 in) wide and usually covered with silky to woolly hairs. The flowers are bisexual and usually arranged singly in leafy spikes covered with woolly tufts. The fruiting perianth is sessile, 8 mm (0.31 in) covered with wool, the tube crust-like, hemispherical and 2–3 mm (0.079–0.118 in) in diameter with a circular wing about 0.5 mm (0.020 in) wide with a radial slit.

== Taxonomy ==
This species was first formally described in 1849 by Alfred Moquin-Tandon who gave it the name Echinopsilon carnosus in de Candolle's Prodromus Systematis Naturalis Regni Vegetabilis from specimens collected near the Swan River by James Drummond. In 1975, Paul G. Wilson transferred the species to Maireana as M. carnosa. The specific epithet (carnosa) means 'fleshy' or 'pulpy'.

== Distribution and habitat ==
Cottony bluebush is found in south-eastern Queensland, northern South Australia, the Northern Territory and most of Western Australia, apart from the south-west.
