= Goodenia nocoleche =

Scientific classification
- Kingdom: Plantae
- Clade: Tracheophytes
- Clade: Angiosperms
- Clade: Eudicots
- Clade: Asterids
- Order: Asterales
- Family: Goodeniaceae
- Genus: Goodenia
- Species: G. nocoleche

Binomial name
- Goodenia nocoleche Pellow & J.L.Porter

Species of plant

Goodenia nocoleche is a species of flowering plant in the family Goodeniaceae and is endemic to far western New South Wales. It is an ephemeral amphibious herb with floating, lance-shaped leaves and racemes of yellow flowers often tinged with pink.

== Description ==
Goodenia nocoleche is an ephemeral, amphibious herb that typically grows to a height of up to 40 cm (16 in). The leaves at the base of the plant are lance-shaped, 20–40 mm (0.79–1.57 in) long and 7–14 mm (0.28–0.55 in) wide on a petiole up to 600 mm (24 in) long, the leaves floating on the surface of water. The leaves on the stems are similar but smaller. The flowers are arranged in racemes with linear bracts 10–40 mm (0.39–1.57 in) long and linear bracteoles 8–10 mm (0.31–0.39 in) long, each flower on a pedicel 2–5 mm (0.079–0.197 in) long. The sepals are linear, 4–6 mm (0.16–0.24 in) long, the corolla yellow, often tinged with pink 5–5.5 mm (0.20–0.22 in) long. The seeds germinate in shallow temporary wetlands, with partial drying stimulating flowering.

== Taxonomy and naming ==
Goodenia nocoleche was first formally described in 2005 by Belinda Pellow and John L.Porter in the journal Telopea from plants grown from seed collected by Porter from the Nocoleche Nature Reserve in 2000. The specific epithet (nocoleche) refers to the type location.

== Distribution and habitat ==
This goodenia is found in temporary wetlands of the Paroo-Bulloo River region in far western New South Wales, growing in freshwater up to 60 cm (24 in) deep.
