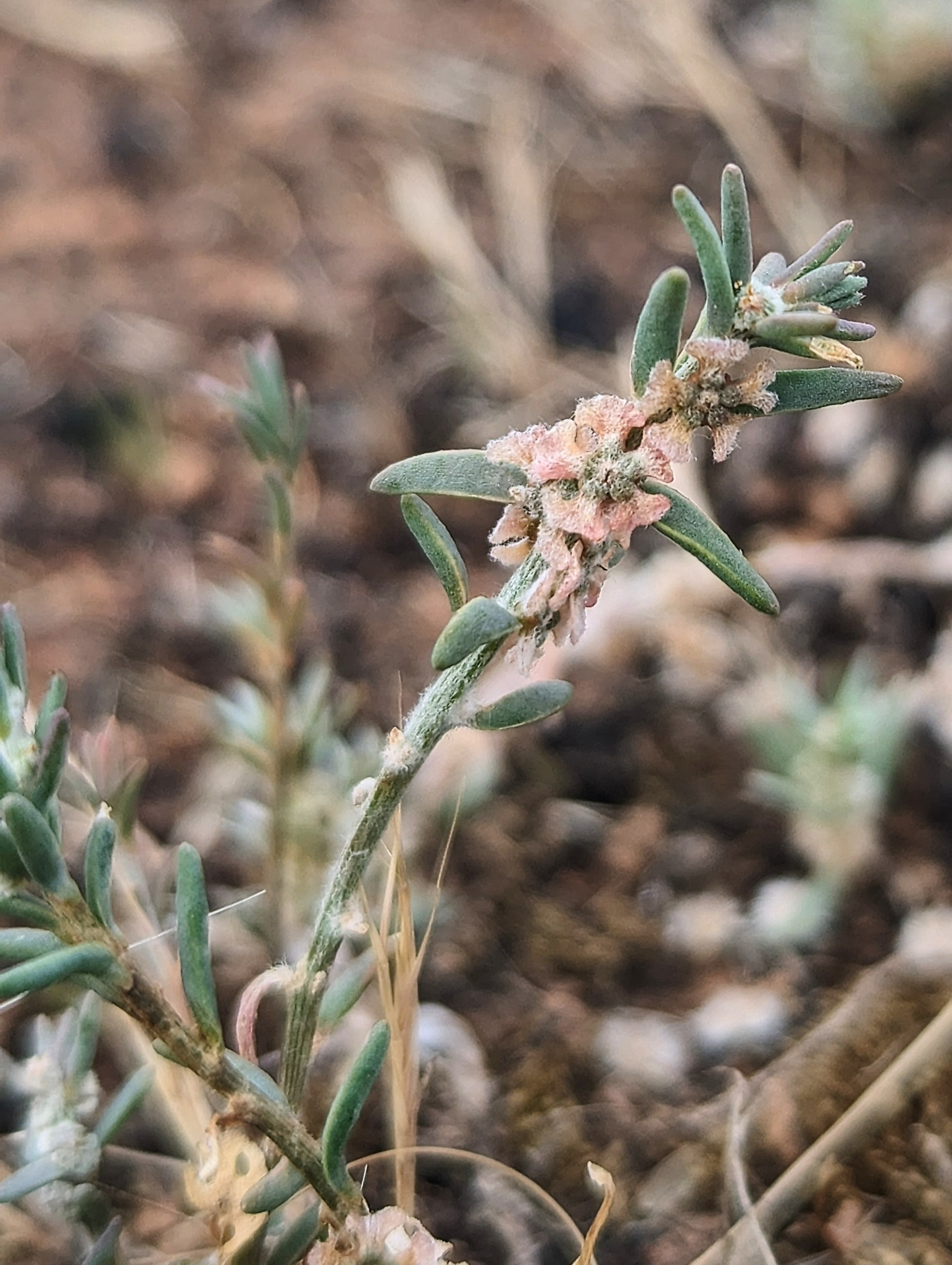

Conservation status
- Vulnerable (EPBC Act)

Scientific classification
- Kingdom: Plantae
- Clade: Tracheophytes
- Clade: Angiosperms
- Clade: Eudicots
- Order: Caryophyllales
- Family: Amaranthaceae
- Genus: Maireana
- Species: M. cheelii

Binomial name
- Maireana cheelii (R.H.Anderson) Paul G.Wilson

Synonyms
- Kochia cheelii R.H.Anderson

= Maireana cheelii =

Species of plant in the amaranth family

Maireana cheelii, commonly known as chariot wheels, is a species of flowering plant in the family Amaranthaceae, and is endemic to eastern Australia. It is a small, erect perennial with more or less terete leaves, bisexual flowers arranged singly or in pairs, and a stiff, cottony fruiting perianth with a wheel-shaped wing.

== Description ==
Maireana cheelii is an erect perennial plant that typically grows to a height of up to 20 cm (7.9 in). Its leaves are more or less terete, fleshy, glabrous and up to 6 mm (0.24 in) long. Its flowers are bisexual and arranged singly or in pairs, the fruiting perianth stiff, wheel-shaped and woolly on the upper surface, 5–6 mm (0.20–0.24 in) in diameter, with five wings up to 2.5 mm (0.098 in) long with a radial ridge visible on the tube.

== Taxonomy ==
This species was first formally described in 1934 by Robert Henry Anderson who gave it the name Kochia cheelii in Proceedings of the Linnean Society of New South Wales from specimens collected by Ernest Officer in 1913. In 1975, Paul Wilson reassigned it to the genus, Maireana as M. cheelii in the journal Nuytsia. The specific epithet (cheelii) honours Edwin Cheel, who first drew attention to this species.

== Distribution and habitat ==
Maireana cheelii usually grows on winter-wet, heavy loam or clay soils, usually with Atriplex vesicaria in the far south-west of New South Wales and near Lake Buloke and Kerang in Victoria. It was previously known from Kamarooka in Victoria, and near Eulo and Thargomindah in Queensland, but has not been seen in that state since 1936.

== Conservation status ==
Chariot wheels is listed as "vulnerable" species under the Australian Government Environment Protection and Biodiversity Conservation Act 1999 and the New South Wales Government Biodiversity Conservation Act. Threats to its current populations include weed invasion, grazing by stock, roadworks, and recreational vehicle use.
