= Lemphoria humistrata =

Scientific classification
- Kingdom: Plantae
- Clade: Tracheophytes
- Clade: Angiosperms
- Clade: Eudicots
- Clade: Rosids
- Order: Brassicales
- Family: Brassicaceae
- Genus: Lemphoria
- Species: L. humistrata

Binomial name
- Lemphoria humistrata (F.Muell.) Al-Shehbaz & Lysak

Synonyms
- Bursa humistrata (F.Muell.) Kuntze; Capsella humistrata F.Muell.; Cuphonotus humistratus (F.Muell.) O.E.Schulz; Cuphonotus humistratus var. papillosus O.E.Schulz

Species of plant

Lemphoria humistrata is a species of plant in the Brassicaceae family. It is an annual native to New South Wales, where it grows on the central and north central western plains.

The species was first described in 1878 by Ferdinand von Mueller as Capsella humistrata. In 1933 Otto Eugen Schulz reassigned it to the genus Cuphonotus. In 2022 Ihsan Ali Al-Shehbaz and Martin A. Lysák placed the species in genus Lemphoria as L. humistrata.

== Description ==
It is an annual herb growing to 25 cm tall, and is spreading or erect. The leaves at the base are up to 3 cm long and shallowly pinnatifid to entire, and do not persist, while leaves on the stem are similar but reduced in size.
