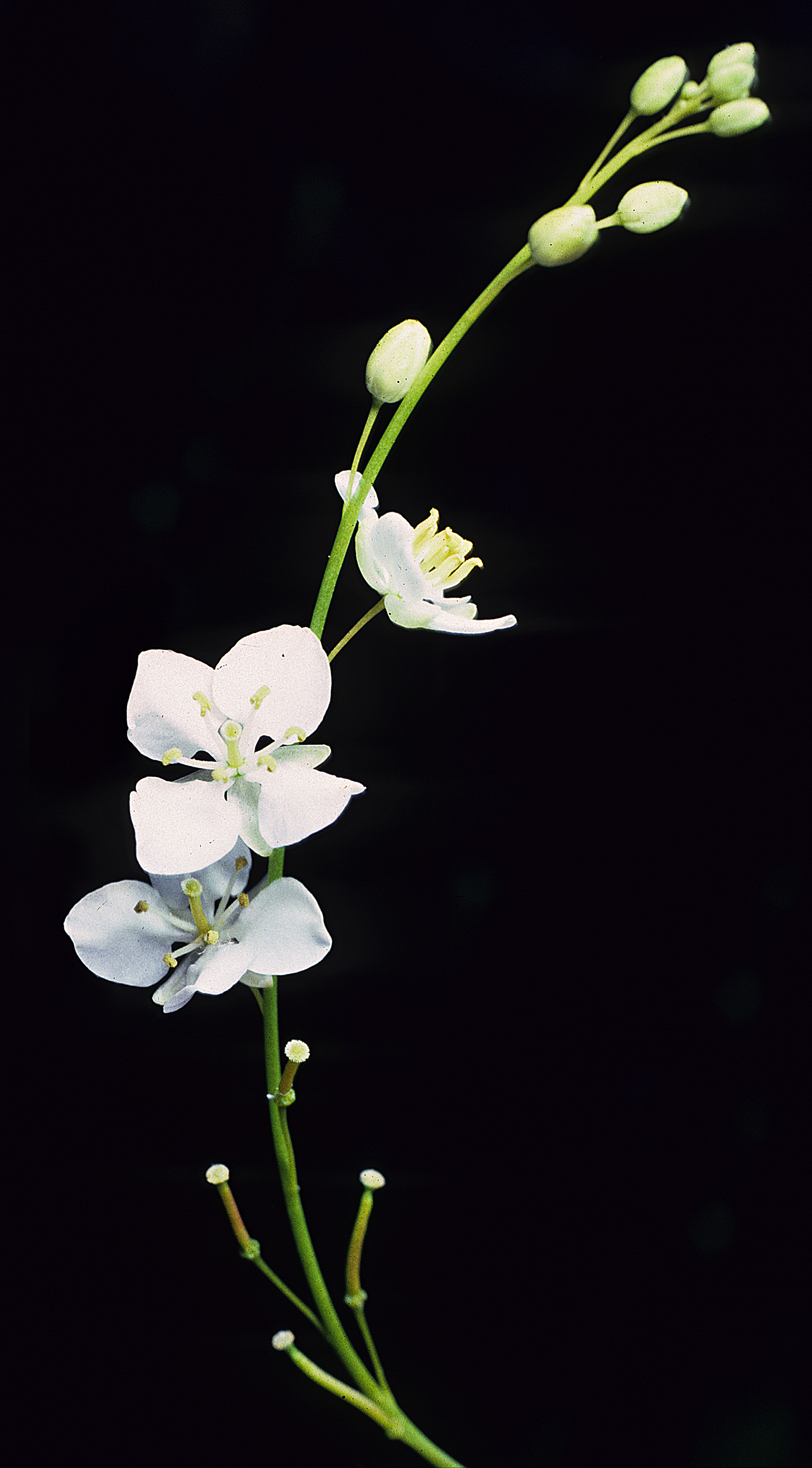

Scientific classification
- Kingdom: Plantae
- Clade: Tracheophytes
- Clade: Angiosperms
- Clade: Eudicots
- Clade: Rosids
- Order: Brassicales
- Family: Brassicaceae
- Genus: Arabidella
- Species: A. trisecta

Binomial name
- Arabidella trisecta (F.Muell.) O.E.Schulz

Synonyms
- Erysimum trisecta F.Muell.; Arabidella trisecta var. hybophora; Blennodia trisecta (F.Muell.) Benth.; Sisymbrium trisectum F.Muell.

= Arabidella trisecta =

Species of flowering plant

Arabidella trisecta (common name - shrubby cress) is a species of flowering plant belonging to the family Brassicaceae. It was first described in 1853 by Ferdinand von Mueller as Erysimum trisecta, but was transferred to the genus, Arabidella in 1924 when by Otto Eugen Schulz elevated Mueller's subgenus Arabidella to genus status. No type specimen was indicated by Mueller in 1853, and in 1965 Elizabeth A. Shaw specified the lectotype as MEL 758 and a paralectotype MEL 0000778A, both collected by Mueller from Spencers Gulf in South Australia.

Its native range is Australia, where it is found throughout the mainland in semi-arid regions.

It is a woody shrub, growing to 30 cm in height. Its stems are terete, quadrangular or fluted, usually having papillae (little nipple shaped bumps) on the ribs. The leaves are 2 to 3 lobed and do not form a basal rosette. The fruit is typically erect and linear (10–40 mm long, 1 mm wide). It flowers from winter to spring.
