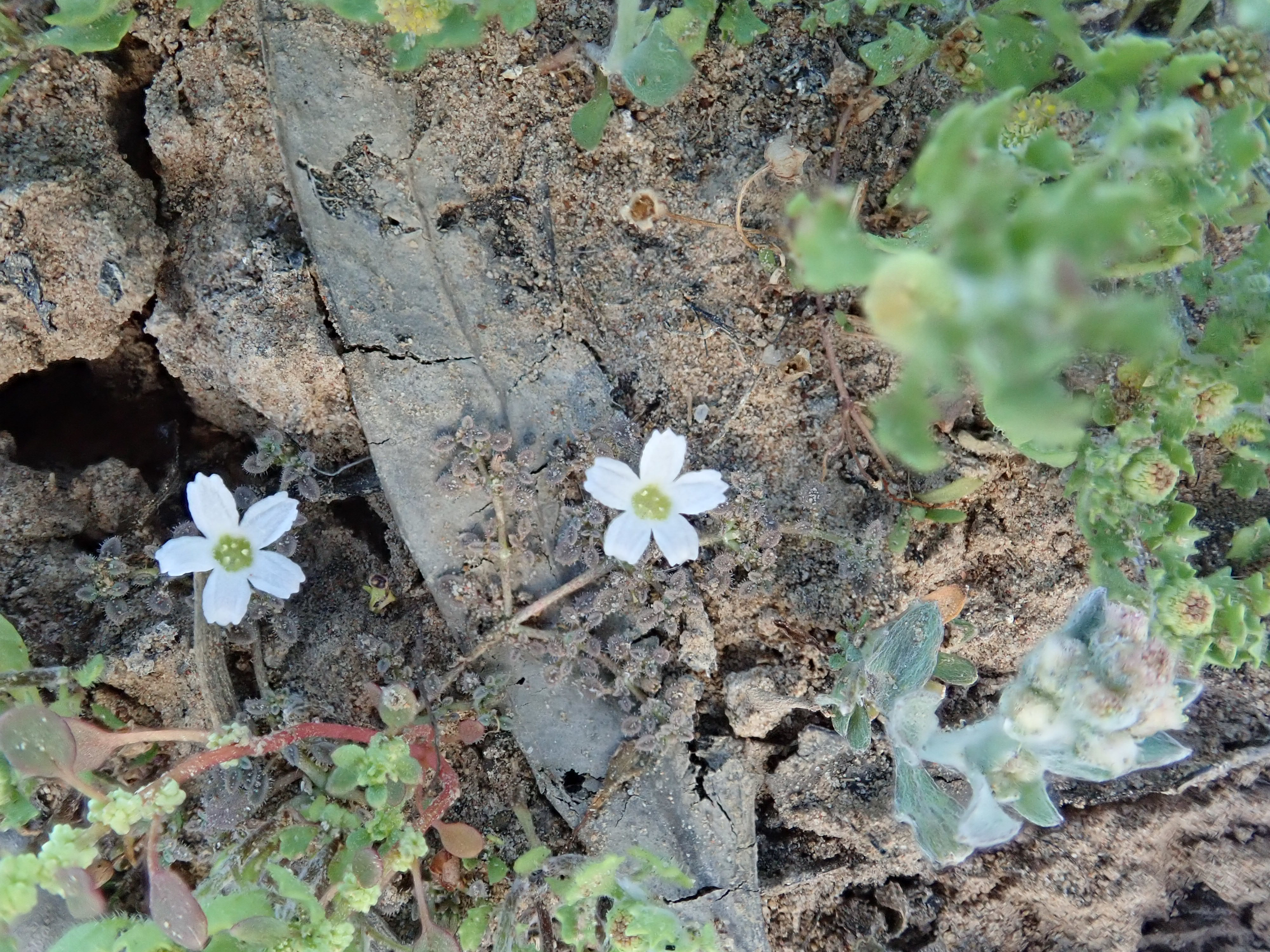
- In Nocoleche Nature Reserve

Conservation status
- Endangered (NSWBCA)
- Least Concern (NCA)

Scientific classification
- Kingdom: Plantae
- Clade: Tracheophytes
- Clade: Angiosperms
- Clade: Eudicots
- Clade: Asterids
- Order: Gentianales
- Family: Rubiaceae
- Genus: Dentella
- Species: D. minutissima

Binomial name
- Dentella minutissima C.T.White & W.D.Francis

= Dentella minutissima =

Species of plant

Dentella minutissima, common name tiny teeth, is a species of flowering plant in the family Rubiaceae and was first described in 1922 by Cyril Tenison White & William Douglas Francis, from a specimen collected near Winton.

It is found growing on sand and grey clay on river banks and in creek beds. "(Plants) often grow in concentric belts or rings parallel to the receding waterline as they colonise newly exposed mudflats".

Plants of the world online lists it as being found in Western Australia, the Northern Territory and Queensland, but PlantNET describes it as also being found in New South Wales, in the Nocoleche Nature Reserve and the Cuttaburra Creek system north west of Bourke, and in South Australia.

In New South Wales it is listed as an endangered species, but in Queensland it is listed as being of "least concern".
