= Nocoleche =

Coordinates: 29°50.302′S 144°06.891′E

Location in New South Wales

Nocoleche Station, now known as Nocoleche Nature Reserve, was a pastoral lease that operated as both a sheep station and a cattle station in outback New South Wales. It is located approximately 150 kilometres (93 mi) north east of White Cliffs and 178 kilometres (111 mi) west of Bourke on the Paroo River south of the Queensland border.

In 1894 the station was carrying approximately 110,000 sheep.

One of the early managers was Walter Gamson who ran Nocoleche from 1870 until his death in 1898 and also was superintendent for Frederick Armytage's properties in Victoria, New South Wales, and Queensland.

Australian Sheep Farms Limited, with directors including Sir Arthur Stanley, R. H. Caird and G. Slade, raised £400,000 in capital to acquire Toorale, Dunlop and Nocoleche Stations in 1925. By 1927 the condition of the property had deteriorated and cattle were introduced, portion of the station had also been resumed by the government.

An auction was held at Nocoleche in 1966 with three blocks offered. The 14,400 acres (5,827 ha; 14,400 acres) homestead block and two other blocks with areas of 82,200 acres (33,300 ha; 82,200 acres) and 79,030 acres (31,980 ha; 79,030 acres) were passed in after not reaching the reserve price. The Treweeke family owned the property from 1928, the property had grazed an average of 30,000 sheep and 700 cattle producing an average of 800 bales of wool and producing 8,000 lambs since 1960.

The property was left to the grandchildren of owner George Treweeke. His grandson John Peken bought the interests of the others in 1974, and lived there with his family until 1978, when the property was bought by National Parks and became Nocoleche Nature Reserve.

== See also ==
- List of ranches and stations
- Nocoleche Nature Reserve
