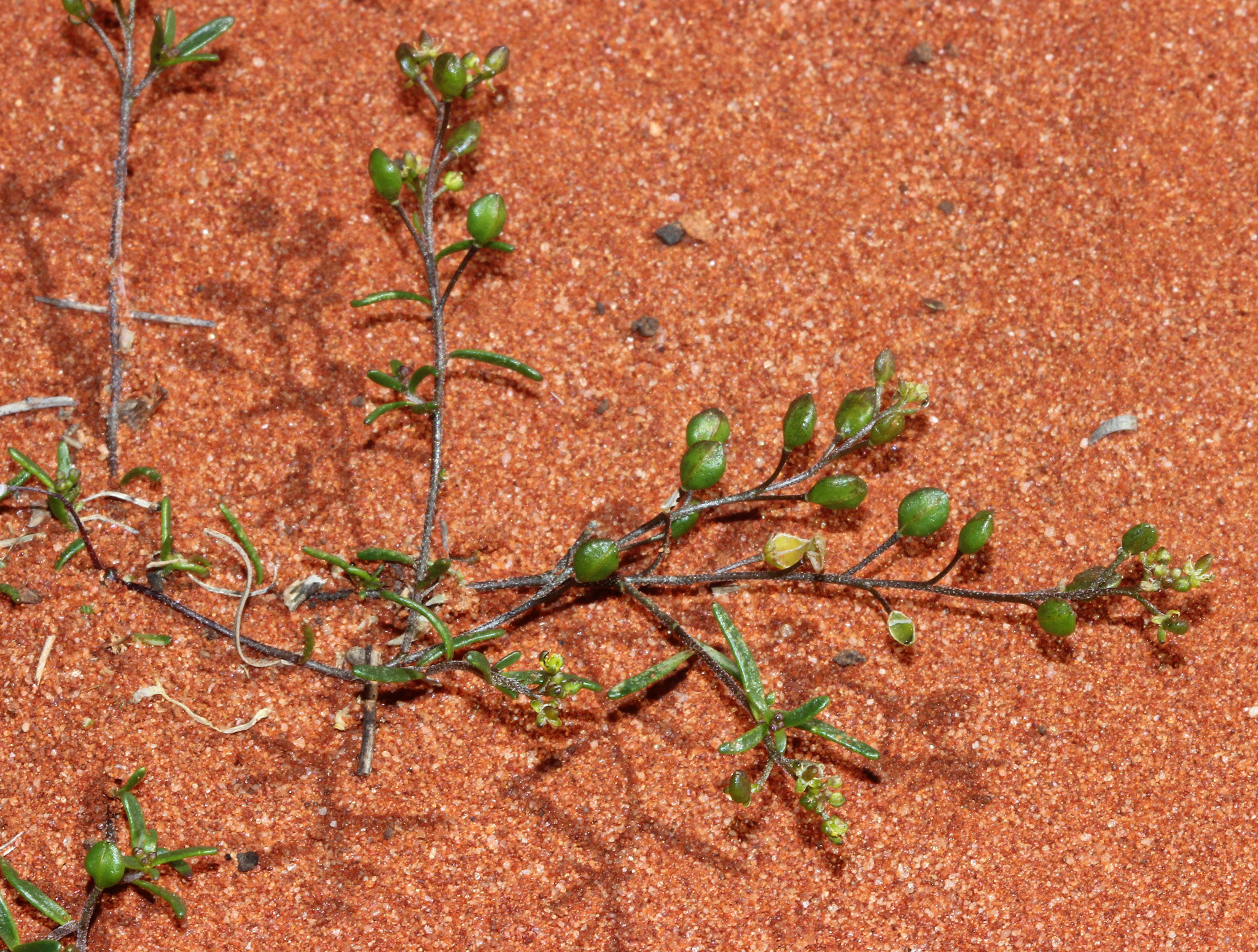
- Lemphoria andraeana

Scientific classification
- Kingdom: Plantae
- Clade: Tracheophytes
- Clade: Angiosperms
- Clade: Eudicots
- Clade: Rosids
- Order: Brassicales
- Family: Brassicaceae
- Genus: Lemphoria; O.E.Schulz (1924)

species
- 5; see text

Synonyms
- Cuphonotus O.E.Schulz (1933)

= Lemphoria =

Genus of flowering plants

Lemphoria is a genus of flowering plants in the family Brassicaceae. It includes five species of annuals and subshrubs native to Australia, ranging from Western Australia to the Northern Territory, South Australia, New South Wales, and Queensland.

== Species ==
Five species are accepted.

- Lemphoria andraeana (F.Muell.) Al-Shehbaz & Lysak
- Lemphoria eremigena (F.Muell.) Al-Shehbaz & Lysak
- Lemphoria humistrata (F.Muell.) Al-Shehbaz & Lysak
- Lemphoria procumbens O.E.Schulz
- Lemphoria queenslandica Edginton, Al-Shehbaz & Lysak
