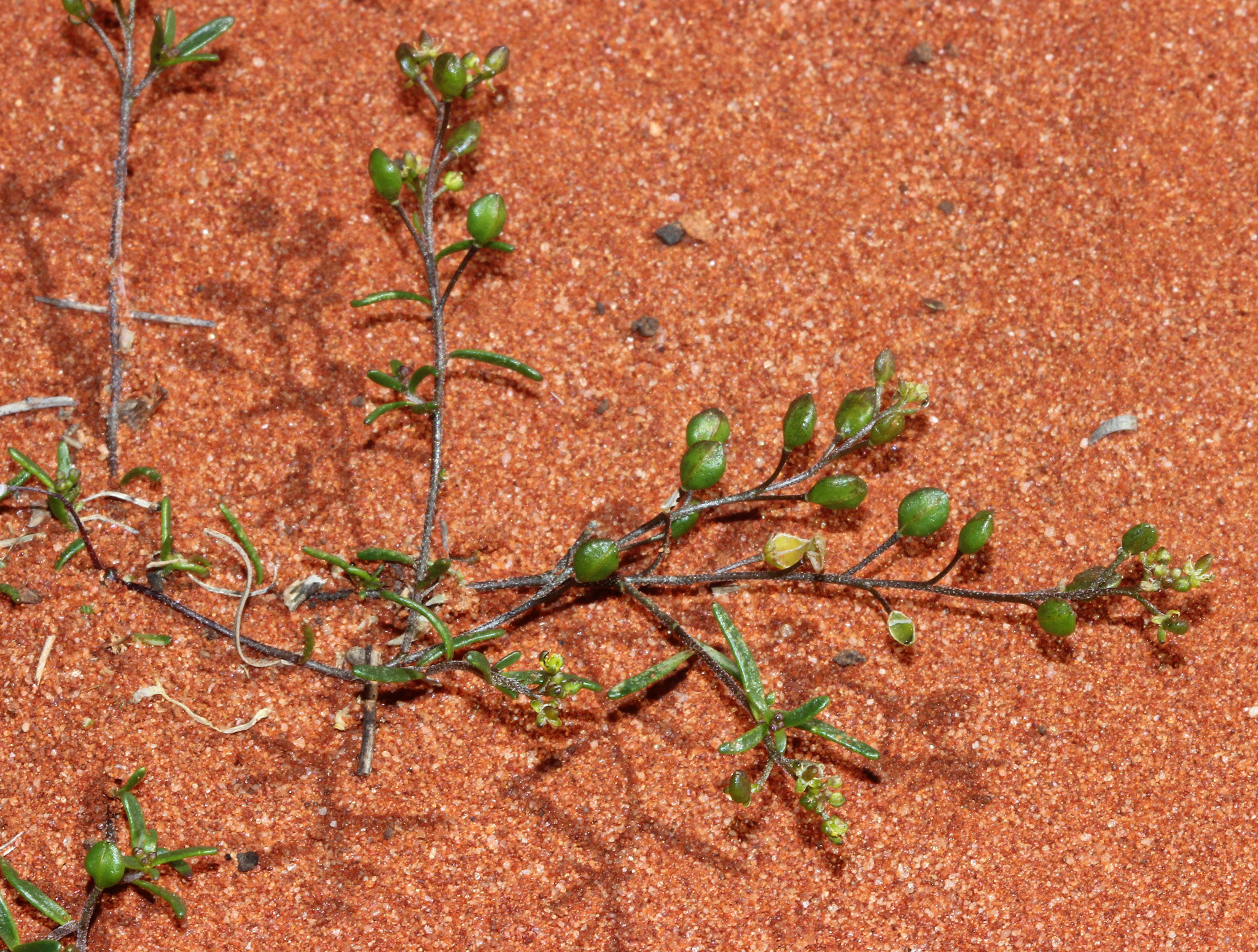

Scientific classification
- Kingdom: Plantae
- Clade: Tracheophytes
- Clade: Angiosperms
- Clade: Eudicots
- Clade: Rosids
- Order: Brassicales
- Family: Brassicaceae
- Genus: Lemphoria
- Species: L. andraeana

Binomial name
- Lemphoria andraeana (F.Muell.) Al-Shehbaz and Lysak

Synonyms
- Capsella andraeana F.Muell.; Cuphonotus andraeanus (F.Muell.) E.A.Shaw; Phlegmatospermum andraeanum (F.Muell.) O.E.Schulz

= Lemphoria andraeana =

Species of plant

Lemphoria andreaeana is a species of flowering plant in the Brassicaceae family. It is an annual found throughout inland Australia.

The species was first described in 1885 by Ferdinand von Mueller as Capsella andraeana. It was reassigned to the genus Cuphonotus in 1974 by Elizabeth Anne Shaw. In 2022 Ihsan Ali Al-Shehbaz and Martin A. Lysák placed the species in genus Lemphoria as L. andraeana.

== Description ==
It is an annual herb growing to 25 cm tall, and is spreading or erect. It has simple hairs, which may be flattened, terete or twisted. The leaves at the base are entire and up to 3 cm long, while those on the stem are similar but reduced in size.
