= Robert Henry Anderson =

Botanist (1899-1969)

Robert Henry Anderson (1899-1969) was botanist who in 1945 became the first Australian-born director of the Royal Botanic Garden in Sydney. He remained director until his retirement in March 1964.

== Early life ==
Anderson was born in Cooma, New South Wales on 12 March 1899, to Rev. William Addison Smyth Anderson and his wife Jane, née Thompson. He is the brother of Sir William Hewson Anderson.

Andserson grew up in Cooma, Bowenfels, Liverpool and Arncliffe in New South Wales while his father (an ordained Presbyterian minister) moved from parish to parish. Anderson and his brother were educated at Fort Street Boys' High School in Petersham, New South Wales.

== Writings ==
Anderson is the author of Tree Planting on the Farm (1931) and The Trees of New South Wales (1932).

The standard author abbreviation R.H.Anderson is used to indicate this person as the author when citing a botanical name.

== Career ==
- Botanical assistant, National Herbarium of New South Wales (1924)
- Botanist and curator, National Herbarium of New South Wales, (1936)
- Chief botanist and curator, National Herbarium of New South Wales and Royal Botanic Garden, Sydney (1945)
- Director and chief botanist, National Herbarium of New South Wales and Royal Botanic Garden, Sydney (1960)
