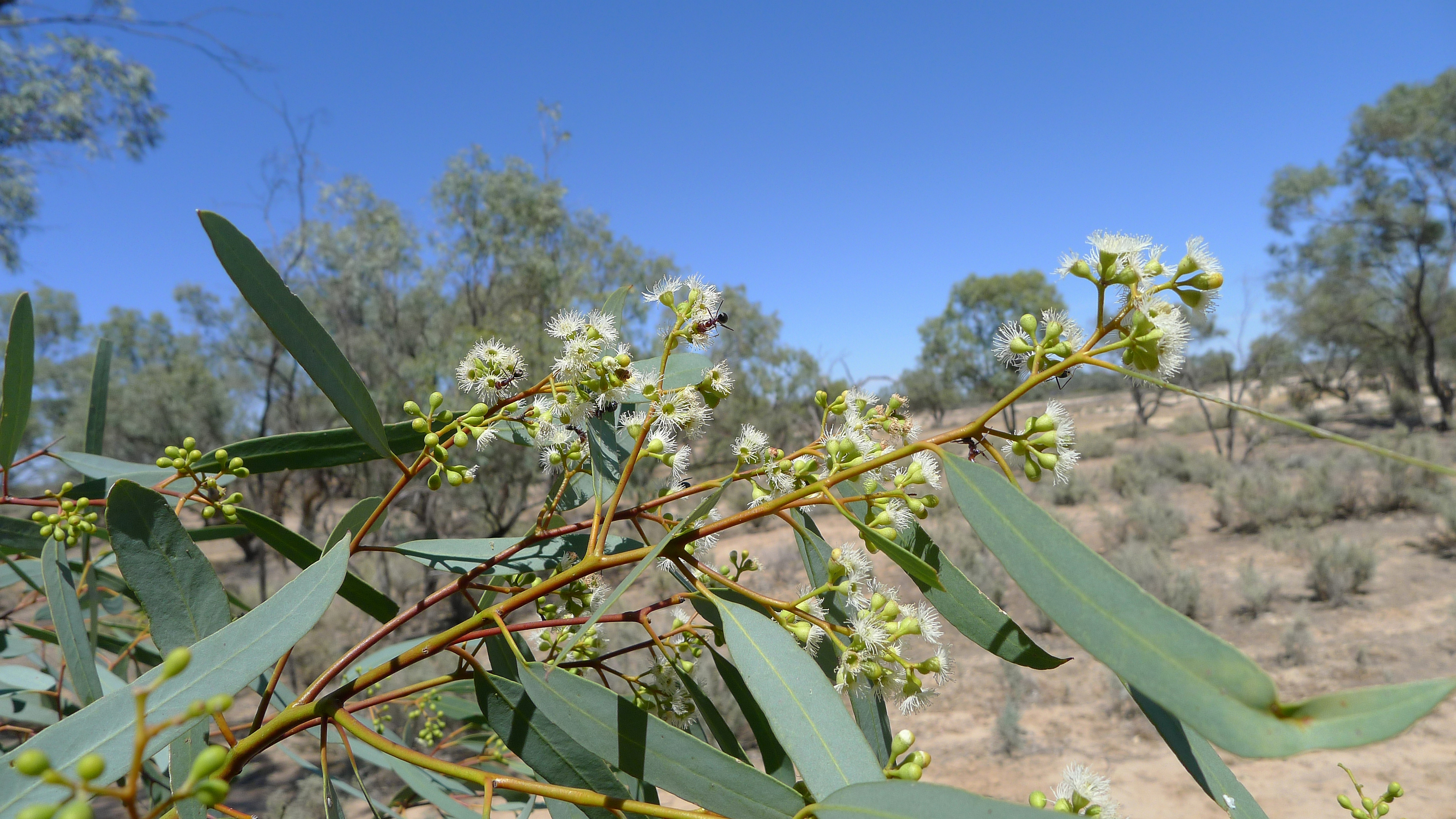

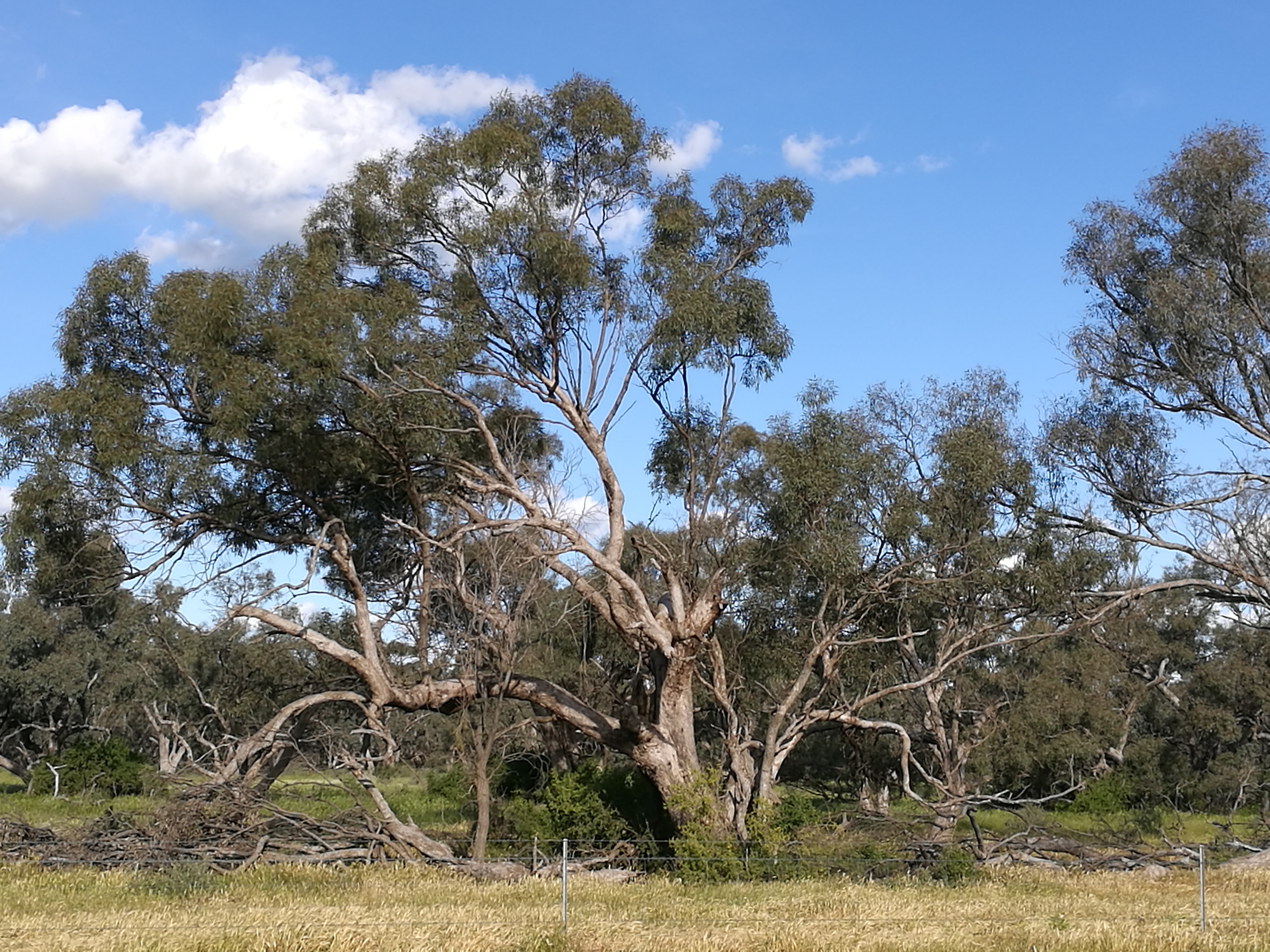

Conservation status
- Vulnerable (IUCN 3.1)

Scientific classification
- Kingdom: Plantae
- Clade: Tracheophytes
- Clade: Angiosperms
- Clade: Eudicots
- Clade: Rosids
- Order: Myrtales
- Family: Myrtaceae
- Genus: Eucalyptus
- Species: E. largiflorens

Binomial name
- Eucalyptus largiflorens F.Muell.
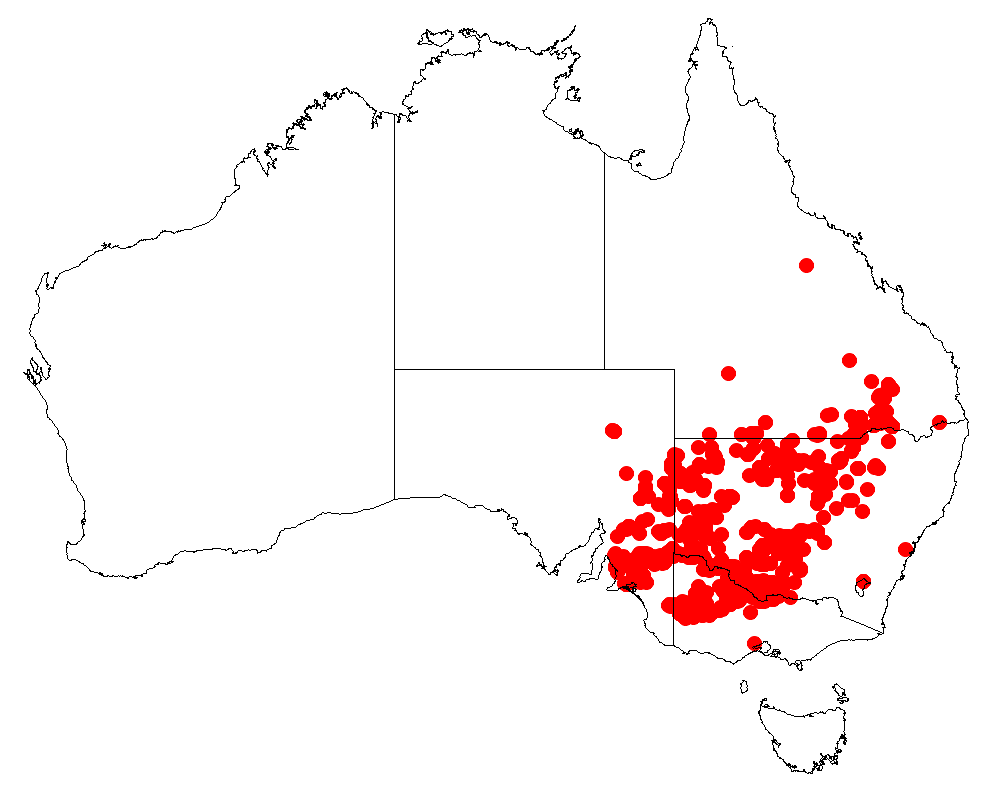
- Occurrence data from AVH

Synonyms
- Eucalyptus largiflorens F.Muell. var. largiflorens; Eucalyptus bicolor A.Cunn. ex T.Mitch.; Eucalyptus parviflora F.Muell.; Eucalyptus bicolor A.Cunn. ex T.Mitch. var. bicolor

= Eucalyptus largiflorens =

Black box

Species of eucalyptus

Eucalyptus largiflorens, or black box or river box, is a tree that is endemic to Australia. It has rough, fibrous or flaky bark, dull greenish-grey, lance-shaped leaves, oval to club-shaped green to yellow flower buds, white flowers and hemispherical, cup-shaped or barrel-shaped fruit.

== Description ==
Eucalyptus largiflorens is a tree that grows to a height of 20 metres (66 ft) with rough bark to the thinnest branches. The bark is dark grey and fibrous or flaky, sometimes furrowed on the trunk. The leaves on young trees are dull greyish green to bluish, linear to narrow lance-shaped, 40–155 mm (2–6 in) long and 4–18 mm (0.2–0.7 in) wide. Adult leaves are lance-shaped, the same shade of green on both sides, 60–180 mm (2–7 in) long and 8–20 mm (0.3–0.8 in) wide. The flowers are arranged in groups of mostly between seven and eleven on the ends of the branches or in leaf axils on a cylindrical peduncle 3–11 mm (0.12–0.43 in) long, individual flowers on a cylindrical pedicel 1–5 mm (0.039–0.20 in) long. The mature buds are green to yellow, oval to club-shaped, 4–5 mm (0.16–0.20 in) long and 2–3 mm (0.079–0.12 in) wide. The operculum is hemispherical to cone-shaped, shorter and narrower than the flower cup. The stamens are white. Flowering occurs in most months but especially in autumn and spring. The fruit is a hemispherical to oval capsule, 3–6 mm (0.1–0.2 in) long and 3–5 mm (0.1–0.2 in) wide.

== Taxonomy ==
Eucalyptus largiflorens was first formally described in 1855 by Ferdinand von Mueller and the description was published in Transactions and Proceedings of the Victorian Institute for the Advancement of Science. The specific epithet (largiflorens) is derived from the Latin words largus meaning "abundant" and florens meaning "blooming", referring to the size of the inflorescence.

== Distribution ==
The black box is widespread in Queensland, New South Wales, Victoria and South Australia, especially in grassy woodland on the floodplains of the Murray–Darling basin, but usually in dryer sites than river red gum (E. camaldulensis). The total area occupied by E. largiflorens prior to colonisation was 517,812 km^{2} (199,928 sq mi) but has now been reduced to 293,631 km^{2} (113,372 sq mi) and the population is now severely fragmented. The International Union for the Conservation of Nature listed it as a vulnerable species in 2019.

== Use by Indigenous Australians ==
The small seeds of the black box were eaten raw by Indigenous Australians when grass seeds were scarce. Fruiting branches were cut down and placed in the sun to induce the capsules to open. Once the seeds were extracted, they were soaked and treated with several changes of water to remove the bitterness. They were then dried, ground on a grinding stone, and eaten raw.

The Gamilaraay and Yuwaalaraay people of northern New South Wales use the name guburruu to refer to this species.

== See also ==
- List of Eucalyptus species
