= Muntawa Parish, New South Wales =

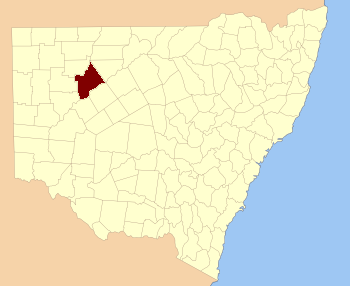
Killara County, NSW.

Muntawa Parish in the County of Killara is a civil parish of New South Wales located in Central Darling Shire at Latitude 31°01′12″S and Longitude 143°40′20″E.

Muntawa Parish in the County of Killara is on the Paroo River between Wilcannia and Tilpa, New South Wales.

== Geography ==
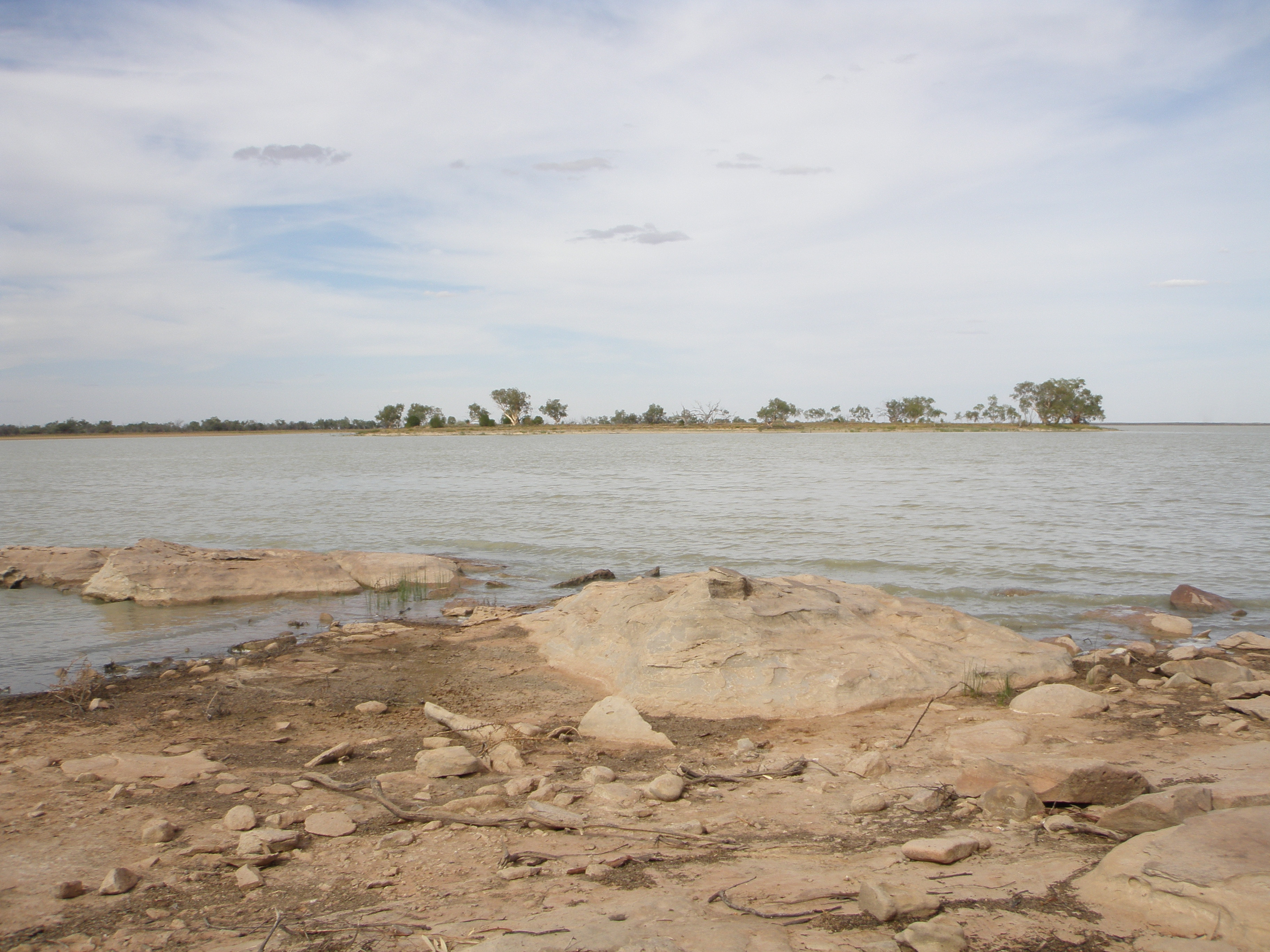
Peery Lake.

The Parish is located at 30°54'03.0"S 143°39'41.0"E and the main geographic features include the Paroo River, Peery and Poloko Lake. The Paroo-Darling National Park is on the opposite side of the Paroo River and the whole area is an important Ramsar Site.

The parish has a Köppen climate classification of BSh (Hot semi-desert).

The Parish is mainly an agricultural area, with sheep grazing the primary activity, and some pockets of irrigated land along the river. Tourism, including farmstay programs on local stations, is the other major local industry.
