= Jamison Parish (County of Killara) =

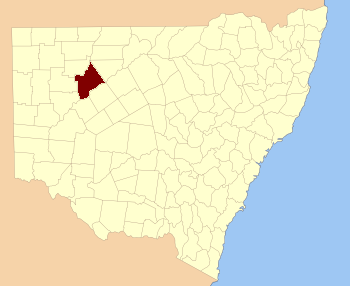
Killara County, NSW.

Jamison Parish is a civil parish of Killara County, located in Central Darling Shire at 31°15′20″S 143°57′33″E.

Jamison Parish is on the Darling River between Wilcannia and Tilpa, New South Wales. The parish has a Köppen climate classification of BSh (Hot semi-desert).

== History ==
In 1838 Thomas Mitchell (explorer) became the first European to the parish as he travelled down the Darling River. In 1861 the Burke and Wills expedition passed nearby to the west.

Today the Parish is mainly an agricultural area, with sheep grazing the primary activity, and some pockets of irrigated land along the river. Tourism, including farmstay programs on local stations, is the other major local industry. Fishing and camping are popular along the river.
