= Walker Parish (County of Killara) =

Civil parish in Central Darling Shire, Australia

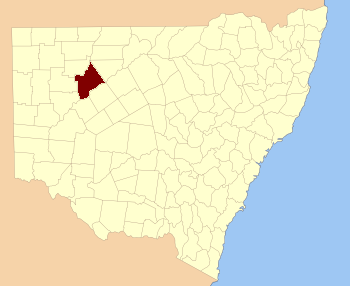
Killara County, NSW.

Walker Parish is a civil parish of Killara County, located in Central Darling Shire at Latitude 31°03′38″S and 144°05′36″E.

Pulacarra is on the Darling River between Wilcannia and Tilpa, New South Wales. The parish has a Köppen climate classification of BSh (Hot semi-desert). The Parish is mainly an agricultural area, with sheep grazing the primary activity, and some pockets of irrigated land along the river. Tourism, Fishing and camping are popular along the river. including farmstay programs on local stations, is the other major local industry. Fishing and camping are popular along the river.

In 1838 Thomas Mitchell (explorer) became the first European to the parish as he travelled down the Darling River. In 1861 the Burke and Wills expedition passed nearby to the west.
