= Hay Parish (County of Killara) =

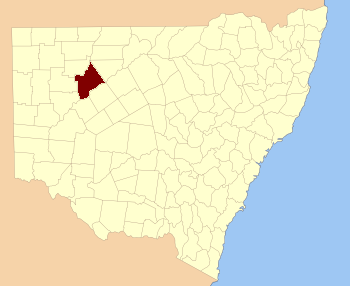
Killara County, NSW.

Hay Parish is a civil parish of Killara County, located in Central Darling Shire at Latitude 31°06′35″S and Longitude144°08′50″E .

Hay Parish is on the Darling River between Wilcannia and Tilpa, New South Wales. The parish has a Köppen climate classification of BSh (Hot semi-desert).

The Parish is mainly an agricultural area, with sheep grazing the primary activity, and some pockets of irrigated land along the river. Tourism, Fishing and camping are popular along the river. Tourism including farmstay programs on local stations, is the other major local industry. Fishing and camping are popular along the river.

In 1838 Thomas Mitchell (explorer) became the first European to the parish as he travelled down the Darling River. In 1861 the Burke and Wills expedition passed to the west.

== See also ==
- Hay, New South Wales
- Hay Parish, Waradgery
