= Marra, New South Wales =

Marra New South Wales
- Coordinates: 30°56′11″S 144°25′0″E
- Postcode(s): 2840
- Elevation: 88 m (289 ft)
- Location: 917 km (570 mi) NW of Sydney; 340 km (211 mi) NE of Broken Hill; 144 km (89 mi) NE of Wilcannia
- LGA(s): Central Darling Shire
- State electorate(s): Barwon
- Federal division(s): Farrer

Marra Parish is a Civil Parish of Killara County, New South Wales.

Marra Parish is on the Darling River at 30°59′31″S 144°20′00″E just outside the town of Tilpa, New South Wales, located in Central Darling Shire. The Parish is mainly an agricultural area, with sheep grazing the primary activity, and some pockets of irrigated land along the river. Tourism, including farmstay programs on local stations, is the other major local industry. Fishing and camping are popular along the river.

The parish has a Köppen climate classification of BSh (Hot semi-desert).
