= Bonny Parish (County of Killara), New South Wales =

Coordinates: 31°03′38″S 144°05′36″E

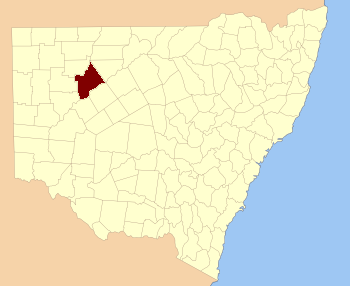
Killara County, NSW.

Bonny Parish (County of Killara), New South Wales is a civil parish of Killara County, in Central Darling Shire.

Bonny Parish is on the Paroo River between Wilcannia and Tilpa, New South Wales, and is in the Paroo-Darling National Park, making the area an important Ramsar Site.

The parish has a Köppen climate classification of BSh (Hot semi-desert).

The Parish is mainly a mix of conservation and agricultural uses, with sheep grazing the primary activity. Tourism, including farmstay programs on local stations, is the other major local industry. Fishing and camping are popular along the river.

== History ==
The Parish is on the traditional lands of the Wandjiwalgu Aboriginal peoples.

In 1838 Thomas Mitchell (explorer) travelled down the nearby Darling River, but did not enter the parish. Charles Sturt passed through the Wandjiwalgu lands during 1845, In 1861 the Burke and Wills expedition passed nearby to the west.

Opal was discovered at nearby White Cliffsin the area in the late 19th century.

The National Park was established in 2000.
