= Tallandra, New South Wales =

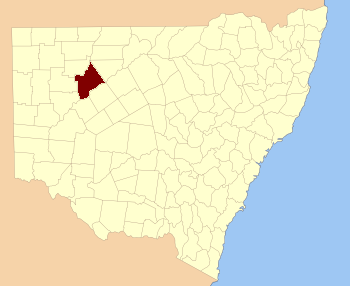
Killara County, NSW.

Tallandra is a civil parish of Killara County, located in Central Darling Shire at Latitude -31°24′11″S and Longitude 143°40′25″E.

Tallandra Parish is on the Darling River between Wilcannia and Tilpa, New South Wales. The parish has a Köppen climate classification of BSh (Hot semi-desert).

The Parish is mainly an agricultural area, with sheep grazing the primary activity, and some pockets of irrigated land along the river. Tourism, Fishing and camping are popular along the river. including farmstay programs on local stations, is the other major local industry. Fishing and camping are popular along the river.
