= Killara Parish (County of Killara) =

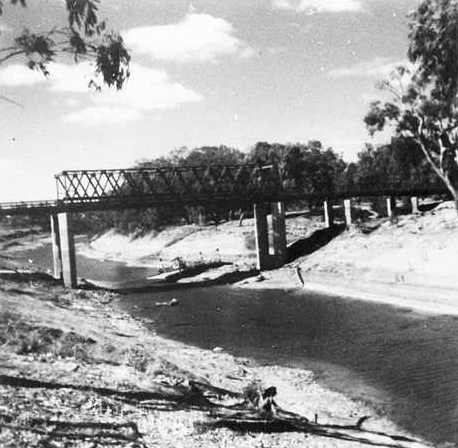
- The Darling River at Tilpa c. 1945. The punt can be seen behind the new bridge

- Coordinates: 30°56′11″S 144°25′0″E
- Country: Australia
- State: New South Wales
- LGA: Central Darling Shire
- Location: 917 km (570 mi) NW of Sydney; 340 km (210 mi) NE of Broken Hill; 144 km (89 mi) NE of Wilcannia

Government
  - State electorate: Barwon
  - Federal division: Farrer
- Elevation: 88 m (289 ft)

Population
  - Total: 44 (2016 census)
- Postcode: 2840

Killara Parish in the County of Killara is a civil parish of Killara County, located in Central Darling Shire at Latitude.

== Geography ==
Killara Parish is on the Darling River and the village of Tilpa, New South Wales is the only settlement in the parish.

The parish has a Köppen climate classification of BSh (Hot semi-desert). The parish is barely inhabited, and the landscape is a flat arid scrubland.

The Parish is mainly an agricultural area, with sheep grazing the primary activity, and some pockets of irrigated land along the river. Tourism, Fishing and camping are popular along the river. including farmstay programs on local stations, is the other major local industry. Fishing and camping are popular along the river.

In 1838 Thomas Mitchell (explorer) became the first European to the parish as he travelled down the Darling River.

== See also ==
- Killara, New South Wales
- Killara County
