= Dolora, New South Wales =

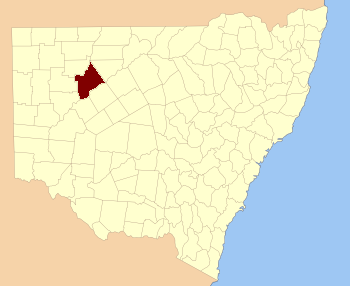
Killara County, NSW.

Dolora Parish is a civil parish of Killara County, located in Central Darling Shire of NSW at Latitude 31°20′07″S and 143°59′32″E .

Dolora Parish is on the Darling River between Wilcannia and Tilpa, New South Wales. The parish has a Köppen climate classification of BSh (Hot semi-desert). The parish is barely inhabited with a population density of fewer than 1 person per 150 km^{2} and the landscape is a flat arid scrubland.

The Parish is mainly an agricultural area, with sheep grazing the primary activity, and some pockets of irrigated land along the river. Tourism, Fishing and camping are popular along the river. including farmstay programs on local stations, is the other major local industry. Fishing and camping are popular along the river.

In 1838 Thomas Mitchell became the first European to the parish as he travelled down the Darling River.
