= Towri, New South Wales =

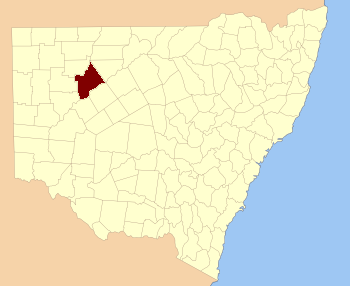
Killara County, NSW.

Towri Parish is a civil parish of Killara County, located in Central Darling Shire at Latitude 31°03′38″S and 144°05′36″E.

Towri Parish is on the Darling River between Wilcannia and Tilpa, New South Wales. The parish has a Köppen climate classification of BSh (Semi desert).

The Parish is mainly an agricultural area, with sheep grazing the primary activity, and some pockets of irrigated land along the river. Tourism, Fishing and camping are popular along the river. including farmstay programs on local stations, is the other major local industry. Fishing and camping are popular along the river.
