= Moollawoolka, New South Wales =

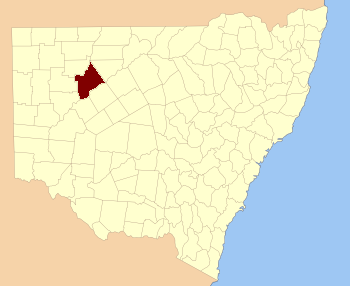
Killara County, NSW.

Moollawoolka is a rural locality and a civil parish of Killara County, in New South Wales

The parish has a Köppen climate classification of BSh (Hot semi-desert).

Moolawoolka is on the Paroo River at 30°33′23″S 143°52′38″E which is between Paroo-Darling National Park and Nocoleche Nature Reserve. The Paroo River represents an oasis in the otherwise arid and featureless landscape of the northwest New South Wales and the area has been declared an important Ramsar Site.

The main geographic features of the parish are Tongo Lake and the Paroo River, and the parish is near the Norma Downs Cattle Station. The nearest town is Wilcannia, New South Wales.
