= Graham Parish (County of Killara) =

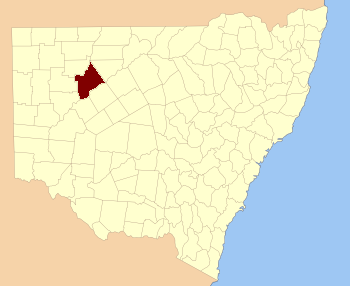
Killara County, NSW.

Graham Parish in the County of Killara is a civil parish of New South Wales located in Central Darling Shire at Latitude 31°01′12″S and Longitude 143°40′20″E.

Graham Parish in the County of Killara is on the Paroo River between Wilcannia and Tilpa, New South Wales.

The parish has a Köppen climate classification of BSh (Hot semi-desert). The Parish is mainly an agricultural area, with sheep grazing the primary activity, and some pockets of irrigated land along the river. Tourism, including farmstay programs on local stations, is the other major local industry.
