= Gigel =

Gigel may refer to:

- Gigel, New South Wales

== People with the given name ==
- Gigel Anghel (born 1955), Romanian wrestler
- Gigel Bucur (born 1980), Romanian footballer
- Gigel Coman (born 1978), Romanian footballer
- Gigel Ene (born 1982), Romanian footballer
