= Mount Jack, New South Wales =

Civil parish in Australia

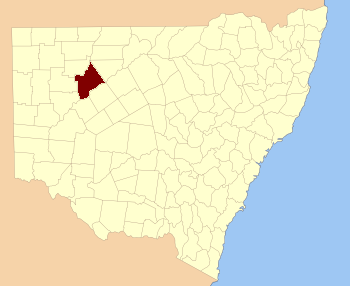
Killara County, NSW.

Mount Jack parish is a civil parish of Killara County, located in Central Darling Shire, New South Wales.

Mount Jack parish is at 30º 52' 9.37" S 143º 42' 16.91" E and is on the Paroo River near its junction with the Darling River, and Mount Jack Parish is named for the mountain in northwest New South Wales. Mount Jack is at an altitude of about 203m above sea level and the nearest town is White Cliffs, New South Wales.

The economy of the area is based on broad area grazing.
