= Killara County =

Killara New South Wales
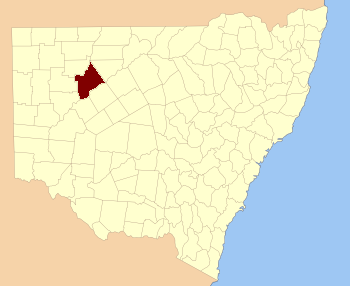
- Location in New South Wales
Lands administrative divisions around Killara:
Fitzgerald	Fitzgerald	Landsborough
Yungnulgra	Killara	Yanda
Young	Werunda	Rankin

Killara County is one of the 141 cadastral divisions of New South Wales. The Darling River is its south eastern boundary.

Killara County was named after Killara Station with Killara believed to be derived from a local Aboriginal word.

== Parishes within this county ==
A full list of parishes found within this county; their current LGA and mapping coordinates to the approximate centre of each location is as follows:

Parish	LGA	Coordinates
Arabi	Central Darling Shire	30°45′17″S 144°27′03″E
Balara	Central Darling Shire	30°50′45″S 144°12′43″E
Batthing	Central Darling Shire	30°49′03″S 143°48′26″E
Binpooker	Central Darling Shire	30°21′28″S 144°00′45″E
Bonny	Central Darling Shire	30°48′45″S 143°34′44″E
Bungadool	Central Darling Shire	30°56′05″S 144°09′56″E
Byco Birra	Central Darling Shire	30°49′24″S 144°01′53″E
Callindra	Central Darling Shire	31°12′37″S 143°48′20″E
Calpacaira	Central Darling Shire	30°33′31″S 144°02′18″E
Cobrilla	Central Darling Shire	
Devon	Central Darling Shire	31°09′19″S 143°53′18″E
Dilkoosha	Central Darling Shire	
Dolora	Central Darling Shire	31°20′07″S 143°59′32″E
Euola	Central Darling Shire	31°00′09″S 144°02′32″E
Far West	Central Darling Shire	30°37′09″S 144°19′50″E
Gigel	Central Darling Shire	31°23′18″S 143°52′21″E
Gordon	Central Darling Shire	31°04′12″S 143°47′59″E
Graham	Central Darling Shire	31°01′12″S 143°40′20″E
Hay	Central Darling Shire	31°06′35″S 144°08′50″E
Jamieson	Central Darling Shire	31°15′20″S 143°57′33″E
Kambula	Central Darling Shire	
Killara	Central Darling Shire	30°53′44″S 144°25′14″E
Marra	Central Darling Shire	30°59′31″S 144°20′00″E
Moollawoolka	Central Darling Shire	30°33′23″S 143°52′38″E
Mount Jack	Central Darling Shire	30°56′32″S 143°32′14″E
Muntawa	Central Darling Shire	30°54′03″S 143°39′41″E
Musgrave	Central Darling Shire	30°43′24″S 143°58′03″E
Myali	Central Darling Shire	31°03′09″S 144°15′12″E
Myall	Central Darling Shire	30°37′42″S 144°08′57″E
Newland	Central Darling Shire	31°07′39″S 143°59′41″E
Parkes	Central Darling Shire	31°04′09″S 143°56′32″E
Paroo	Central Darling Shire	30°36′25″S 144°00′50″E
Pulacarra	Central Darling Shire	30°43′49″S 144°04′16″E
Reddin	Central Darling Shire	31°05′33″S 143°37′26″E
Service	Central Darling Shire	30°43′13″S 144°15′23″E
Stewart	Central Darling Shire	30°59′25″S 144°12′20″E
Tallandra	Central Darling Shire	31°24′11″S 143°40′25″E
Tallarara	Central Darling Shire	30°53′06″S 143°50′37″E
Thoolabool	Central Darling Shire	30°48′15″S 144°19′38″E
Tilpa	Central Darling Shire	30°52′35″S 144°33′49″E
Towri	Central Darling Shire	31°03′38″S 144°05′36″E
Tutty	Central Darling Shire	30°30′04″S 144°12′56″E
Undelcarra	Central Darling Shire	30°46′08″S 144°10′15″E
Walker	Central Darling Shire	31°10′51″S 144°02′25″E
Warook	Central Darling Shire	30°58′30″S 143°48′22″E
Warramutty	Central Darling Shire	30°27′12″S 143°57′00″E
Wolseley	Central Darling Shire	30°55′27″S 144°17′45″E
Yamaranie	Central Darling Shire	30°26′44″S 144°06′08″E
