= Fitzgerald County =

Fitzgerald New South Wales
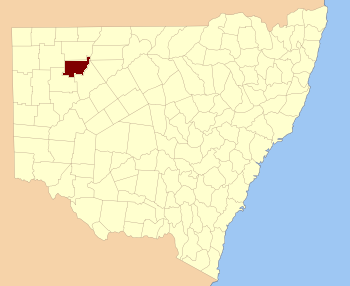
- Location in New South Wales
Lands administrative divisions around Fitzgerald:
Yantara	Ularara	Barrona
Yungnulgra	Fitzgerald	Landsborough
Yungnulgra	Killara	Killara

Fitzgerald County is one of the 141 cadastral divisions of New South Wales.

Fitzgerald County was named in honour of the surveyor and botanist, Robert D. FitzGerald (1830–1892).

== Parishes within this county ==
A full list of parishes found within this county; their current LGA and mapping coordinates to the approximate center of each location is as follows:

Parish	LGA	Coordinates
Alto	Central Darling Shire	30°22′39″S 143°12′34″E
Borrina	Unincorporated	30°12′00″S 143°54′59″E
Carilla	Unincorporated	30°10′33″S 144°01′08″E
Cunellie	Central Darling Shire	30°30′06″S 143°20′49″E
Fiby	Central Darling Shire	30°33′03″S 143°39′49″E
Glespin	Central Darling Shire	30°23′15″S 143°52′15″E
Gueraleh	Central Darling Shire	30°17′41″S 143°40′54″E
Hogarth	Central Darling Shire	30°25′24″S 143°21′31″E
Lestrange	Central Darling Shire	30°35′13″S 143°32′48″E
Moollawoolka	Central Darling Shire	30°33′23″S 143°52′38″E
Moorquong	Central Darling Shire	30°27′17″S 143°31′22″E
Morton	Unincorporated	30°14′09″S 143°24′44″E
Mungundi	Unincorporated	30°04′55″S 144°01′46″E
Murpa	Central Darling Shire	30°18′07″S 143°53′22″E
Parkin	Unincorporated	30°10′37″S 143°45′31″E
Petita	Unincorporated	30°14′54″S 143°05′04″E
Purranga	Central Darling Shire	30°34′12″S 143°27′51″E
Questa	Central Darling Shire	30°20′05″S 143°07′40″E
Quin	Central Darling Shire	30°39′40″S 143°05′59″E
Ranken	Central Darling Shire	30°29′12″S 143°46′22″E
Salisbury	Unincorporated	30°10′34″S 143°34′33″E
Tantivy	Central Darling Shire	30°18′46″S 143°33′43″E
Toonburra	Unincorporated	30°08′48″S 143°55′50″E
Tungara	Unincorporated	30°14′32″S 143°59′54″E
Tungo	Central Darling Shire	30°33′44″S 143°44′47″E
Warramutty	Central Darling Shire	30°27′12″S 143°57′00″E
Winbinyah	Central Darling Shire	30°19′57″S 143°47′04″E
Wonko	Central Darling Shire	30°25′39″S 143°40′22″E
Yapunya	Central Darling Shire	30°24′10″S 143°46′35″E
Yentabangee	Central Darling Shire	unknown
Yooltoo	Central Darling Shire	30°29′13″S 143°08′34″E
