= Peery Lake =

Lake in Australia

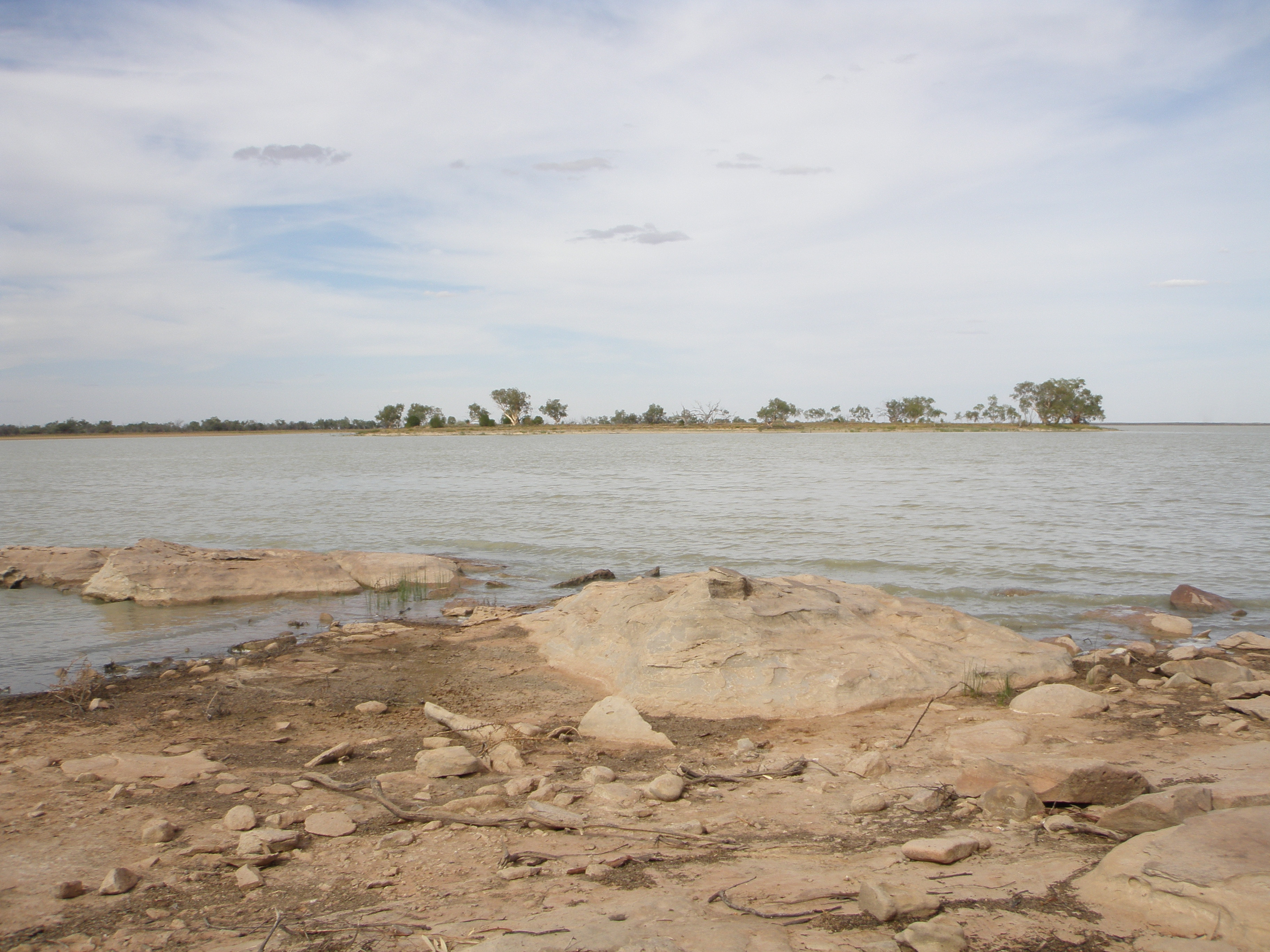
- Peerylake

- Location within New South Wales
- Location: Far West, New South Wales, Australia
- Coordinates: 30°46′S 143°36′E
- Type: ephemeral lake
- Surface area: 5,026 hectares (12,420 acres)

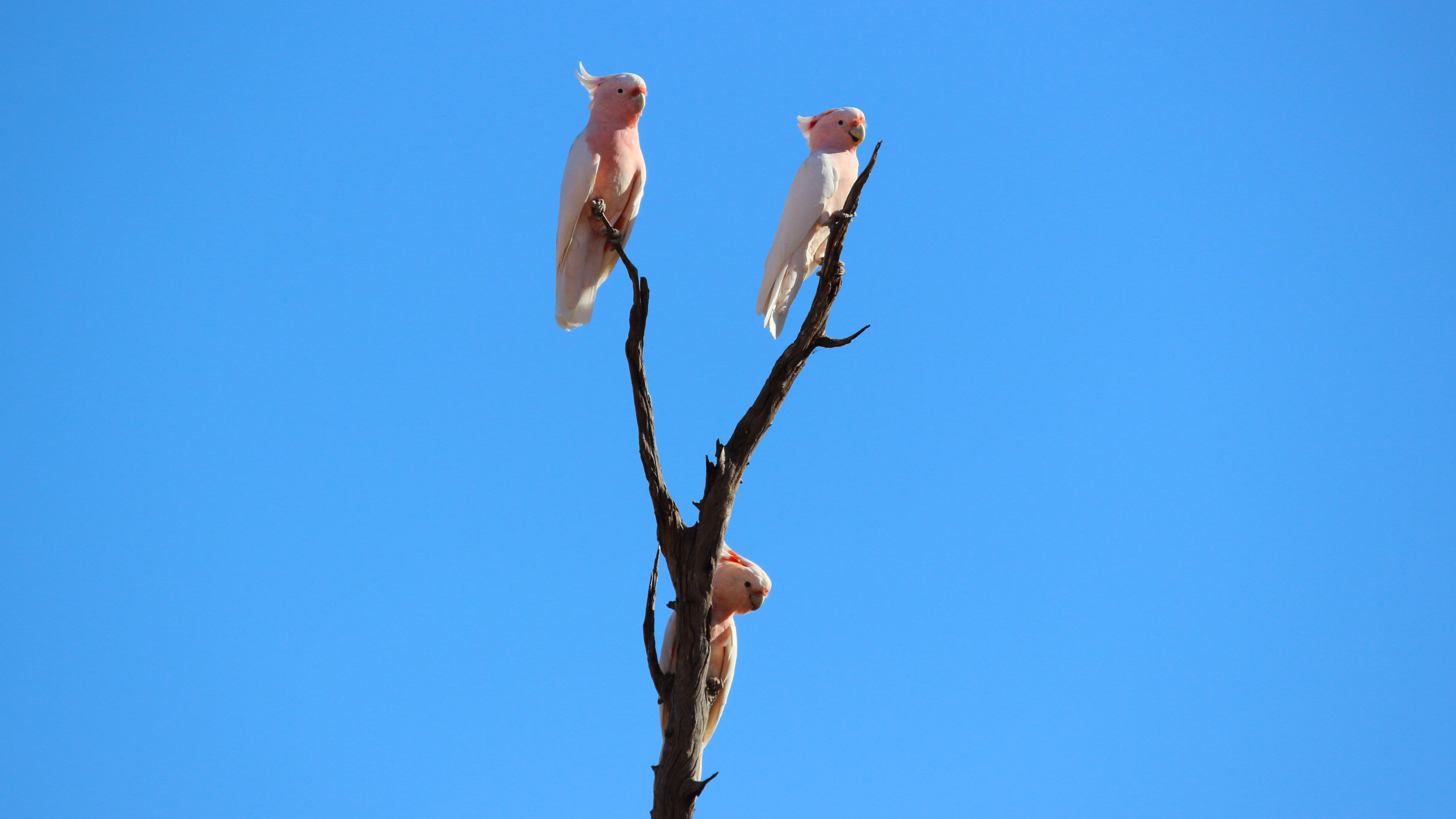
Three Major Mitchell's cockatoo's perched.

Peery Lake is a fresh water lake on the Paroo River, north of Wilcannia, New South Wales, Far West New South Wales.

Peery Lake is an ephemeral lake, 5,026 hectares (12,420 acres) in area and is a Ramsar site.

== Setting ==
The lake in North western New South Wales is between Paroo-Darling National Park and Nocoleche Nature Reserve. This region has a Köppen climate classification of BSh (Hot semi-desert) and is considered to be desert. This stretch of the Paroo River valley represents an oasis in the otherwise arid and featureless landscape of the northwest New South Wales.

== Significance ==
The area has been declared a Ramsar Site.

The area is the traditional lands of the Wandjiwalgu and Paakantyi Aboriginal.
