= Pulacarra, New South Wales =

Rural locality and civil parish of Killara County

Pulacarra is a rural locality and civil parish of Killara County located at Latitude -30.730499267 and Longitude 144.070999145

Pulacarra is on the Paroo River near the Norma Downs cattle station, between White Cliffs, New South Wales and Tilpa, New South Wales.

The parish has a Köppen climate classification of BSh (Hot semi- desert). The parish is barely inhabited and the landscape is a flat arid scrubland.

Pulacarra is in Central Darling Shire at 30°43′49″S 144°04′16″E .
