= Tongo Lake =

Lake in the state of New South Wales, Australia

- Location within Australia
- Location: New South Wales, Australia
- Coordinates: 30°33′23″S 143°52′38″E
- Type: lake

Tongo Lake is a fresh water lake on the Paroo River, north of Wilcannia, New South Wales, in the far west of the state.

== Setting ==
The lake is between Paroo-Darling National Park and Nocoleche Nature Reserve This area has a Köppen climate classification of BSh (Hot semi-desert) and is considered to be desert. This stretch of the Paroo River valley represents an oasis in the otherwise arid and featureless landscape of the northwest New South Wales.

The area has been declared an important Ramsar Site. It covers an area of around 500 hectares. Tongo Lake is located at an altitude of 84 meters.
