= Great Darling Anabranch =

Great Darling Darling
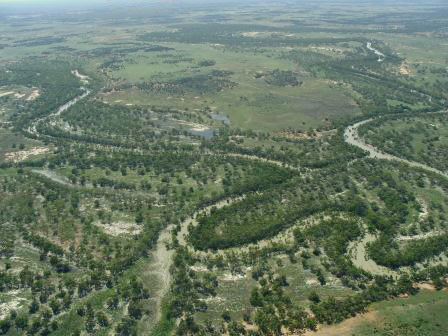
- The Great Darling Anabranch in flood, December 2010.

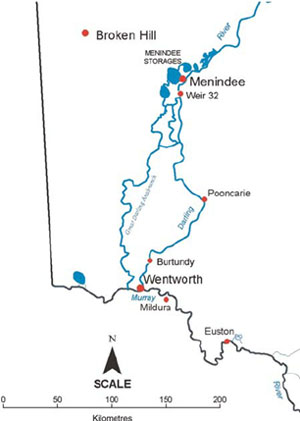
- The Great Darling Anabranch, Darling River, and Menindee lakes

- Location of Great Darling Anabranch mouth in New South Wales

Location
- Country: Australia
- State: New South Wales
- Region: Far West, Riverina

Physical characteristics
- Source: Darling River
  - location: south of Menindee
  - coordinates: 32°52′59″S 142°21′23″E
  - elevation: 60 m (200 ft)
- Mouth: confluence with the Murray River
  - location: west of Wentworth
  - coordinates: 34°05′48″S 141°45′22″E
  - elevation: 33 m (108 ft)
- Length: 460 km (290 mi)

Basin features
- River system: Murray River, Murray-Darling basin
- Tributaries
  - left: Stony Creek (Darling Anabranch)
  - right: Redbank Creek (Darling Anabranch), Coonalhugga Creek, Glue Pot Creek, Popiltah Creek
- Lakes: Lake Mindona; Hunter Waterhole

The Great Darling Anabranch, commonly called the Darling Anabranch, is an anabranch and ancestral path of the Darling River in the lower Murray-Darling basin in the Far West and Riverina regions of New South Wales, Australia.

== Course and features ==
The anabranch flows approximately 460 to 488 kilometres (286 to 303 mi) from its offtake on the Darling River south of Menindee, southward to the Murray River, west of Wentworth. There are approximately twenty ephemeral deflation basin lakes, called the Anabranch Lakes, associated with the Darling Anabranch of which several are over 5,000 hectares (12,000 acres) in size. The Anabranch Lakes and associated marginal vegetation are listed in the Directory of Important Wetlands in Australia and collectively cover an area of 269,000 hectares (660,000 acres).

The Darling Anabranch contains archaeological cultural material and evidence of Aboriginal occupation. The Darling Anabranch is a naturally ephemeral system. After the completion of the Menindee Lakes scheme in the 1960s the system was managed as a permanent water supply for stock and domestic water use for adjacent landholders. A series of 17 weir pools were replenished with an annual replenishment flow, most of which evaporated. Over the 40 years of this flow management there was a decline in the health of the system, including poor water quality, decreased numbers of native fish and a decline in aquatic vegetation.

In 2007 a pipeline was constructed along the length of the Darling Anabranch to supply water to adjacent landholders. The Darling Anabranch was returned to an ephemeral system, with the removal of most structures within the channel, and the first dry phase for over four decades.

Initial results from a ten-year monitoring program showed a marked ecological response to the restoration of the Darling Anabranch. Monitoring began in September 2010 at the breaking of the 'millennium drought', and detected a strong vegetation response including significant increases in riparian tree condition and in the condition of Lignum, a keystone species on the floodplains of the Murray-Darling Basin. The return of the Darling Anabranch to an ephemeral system also increased native fish diversity, and the system is thought to be crucial to maintaining the Murray-Darling Basin native fish community through provision of important habitat and food resources for juvenile life stages during times of flood.

== See also ==
- Menindee Lakes
- Rivers of New South Wales
