= Paroo-Darling National Park =

National park in New South Wales, Australia

- IUCN category II (national park)
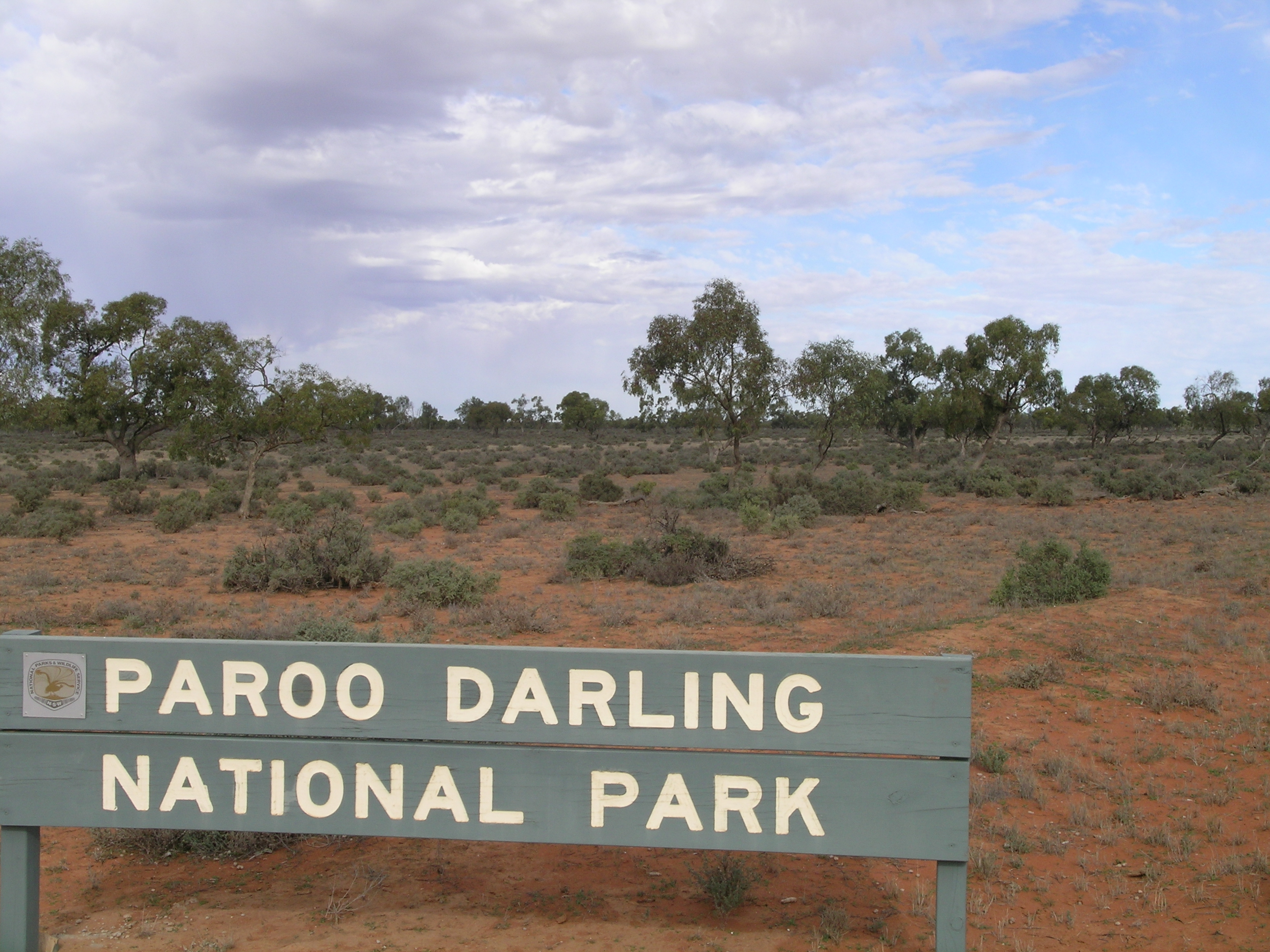
- Sign at entrance

- Location within New South Wales
- Location: New South Wales
- Nearest city: White Cliffs
- Coordinates: 31°31′12″S 143°54′00″E
- Area: 1,780.53 km^{2} (687.47 sq mi)
- Established: March 2000
- Governing body: NSW National Parks & Wildlife Service
- Website: Official website

Ramsar Wetland
- Official name: Paroo River Wetlands
- Designated: 13 September 2007
- Reference no.: 1716

The Paroo-Darling National Park is a protected national park in the Far West region of New South Wales, in eastern Australia. The 178,053-hectare (439,980-acre) national park spans two distinct regions in the outback area. This region covers the arid catchments of the Paroo River (Peery and Poloko Lakes) and the Paroo-Darling confluence to the south.

== History ==
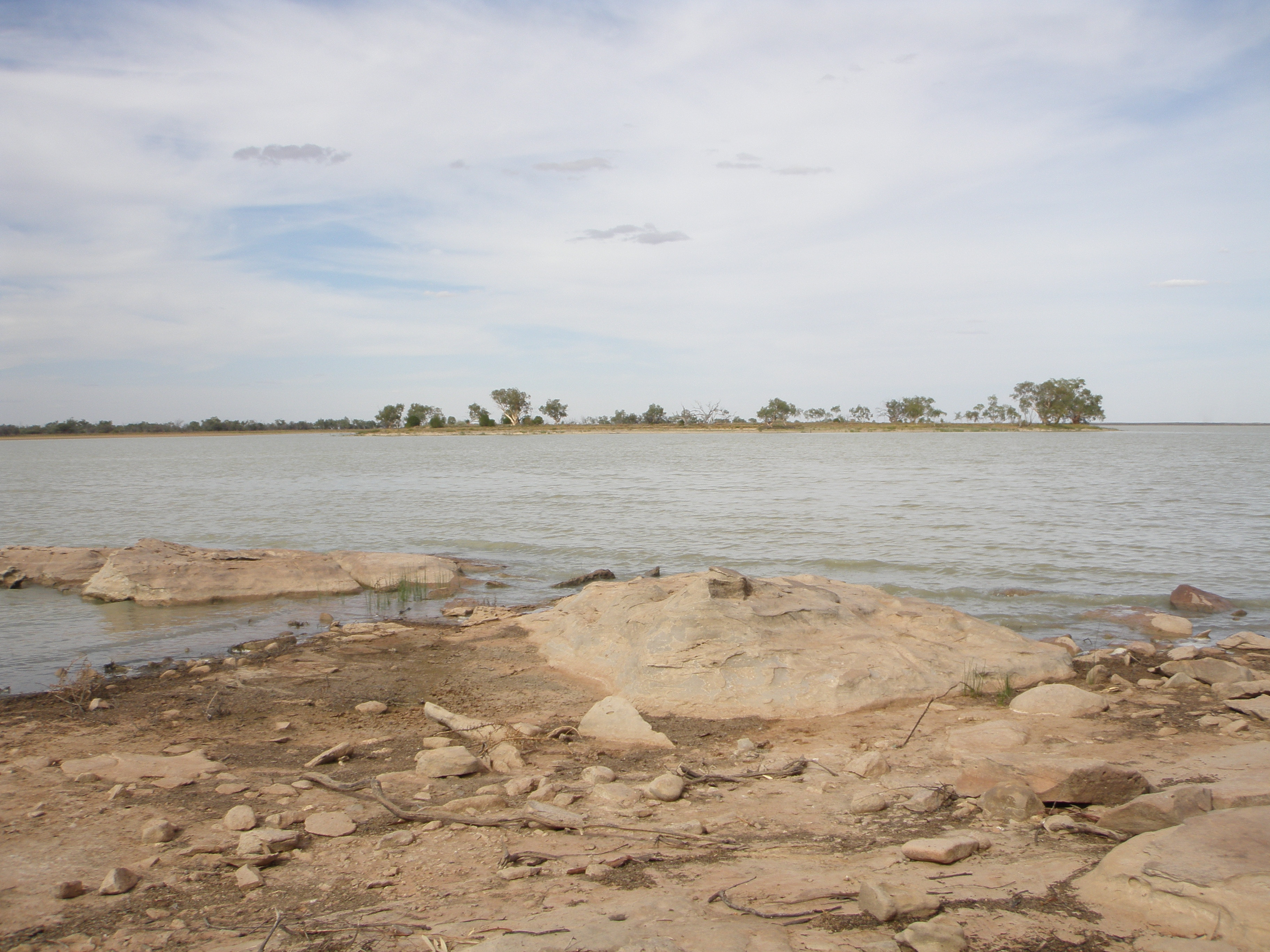
Lake Peery

Aboriginal heritage has been protected here and evidence of a lifestyle spanning back many thousands of years in the hearth sites, stone tool scatters and scarred trees that had supplied bark. Prior to European settlement the area was home to the Paakantyi people. The first European to explore the region was Charles Sturt and his party in 1844. They were followed soon after by others in search of pastures for sheep and cattle in the 1860s and the area became part of the 8,480 square kilometres (3,274 sq mi) Momba Station. From 1902 Momba was successively subdivided until 1950 when the remainder was divided into ten leases including Peery, Mandalay and Arrowbar.

The Paroo-Darling National Park was formed after the purchase of seven properties between 2000 and 2003 by the Government of New South Wales, with assistance from the National Reserve System Program. The former Peery property was the first to be acquired by NSW National Parks and Wildlife Service and was gazetted as the Peery National Park 31 March 2000. In 2001 the pastoral properties Mandalay and Arrowbar were added and the park was re-gazetted as part of the Paroo-Darling National Park in 2002. These three properties were in what is now the northern section of the park, near White Cliffs.

== Paroo Overflow section ==
The Paroo River Overflow section (30.764°S 143.528°E) of the park is located in the far west of New South Wales, Australia, 30 kilometres east of White Cliffs and 80 kilometres north of Wilcannia. The park comprises the former pastoral properties of Peery, Mandalay and Arrowbar and covers an area of approximately 96000 hectares (237000 acres). The park is located within the Mulga Lands Bioregion and has significant biodiversity and landscape values. The wetlands in the park, together with Nocoleche Nature Reserve, form the Paroo River Wetlands Ramsar site. The park also includes active artesian mound springs which are considered to be the rarest landform in Australia.

== Environment ==
The park is set in a landscape of grey cracking clays and red sand hills along the Darling River floodplains. Peery and Poloko Lakes and their associated wetlands form part of the Paroo overflow which is important for wildlife. Peery Lake covers 5,026 hectares (12,420 acres) when in flood and is the largest of the Paroo Overflow lakes. This lake is a water bird haven and when full it will hold water for several years. When dry, Peery Lake is the only location in New South Wales where the Great Artesian Basin mound springs are visible in a lakebed.

Most of the park lies within the Paroo Floodplain and Currawinya Important Bird Area, identified as such by BirdLife International because of its importance, when conditions are suitable, for large numbers of waterbirds.

=== Ecology ===
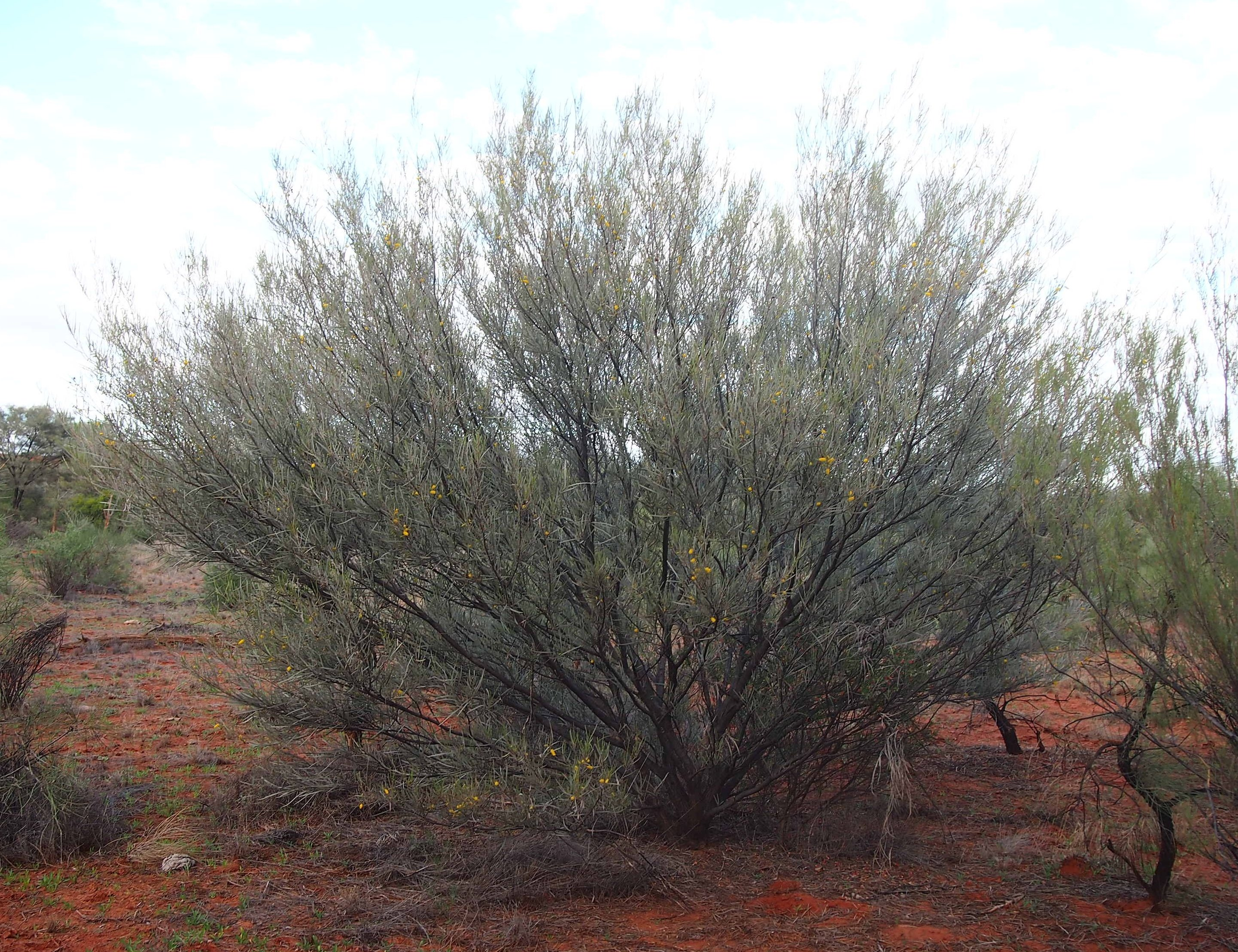
Mulga (Acacia aneura)

The park is located in the Mulga Lands Bioregion which extends from north western NSW into south western Queensland, and contains a range of landforms, each of which supports unique vegetation communities and ecosystems. The predominant vegetation type of this bioregion is dominated by mulga (Acacia aneura) and other woody shrub species. The bioregion also includes the floodplains of the Paroo and Warrego Rivers. The climate of the region is described as arid with low average rainfall which is highly variabile leading to extended droughts and occasional flooding rains. The region is also characterised by evaporation rates that are much higher than average annual rainfall leading to low water availability over much of the region. Temperatures are high in summer and mild in winter. The mulga lands bioregion has suffered from the deterioration of diversity, ecological complexity and ecological functioning due to prolonged overgrazing combined with the semi-arid climate.

=== Topography ===
The landforms protected in the park include the Peery Hills with rugged gorges and low escarpments, ephemeral lake basins, sand plains and dune fields. The park contains two large ephemeral lakes, Lake Peery and Lake Poloko. These lakes are part of the Paroo Overflow lake system and fill on average once every five years and remain filled from between one and three years. These are freshwater lakes but become brackish as they dry. The wetlands have been identified as an important refugia for biodiversity in the region. These wetlands rely on the highly variable flows of the Paroo River which is the last unregulated river system in the Murray-Darling Basin. The variable flow regime of the Paroo River with flooding and drying events is a key ecological process for the park as it creates high habitat heterogeneity which supports high biodiversity.

=== Fauna ===
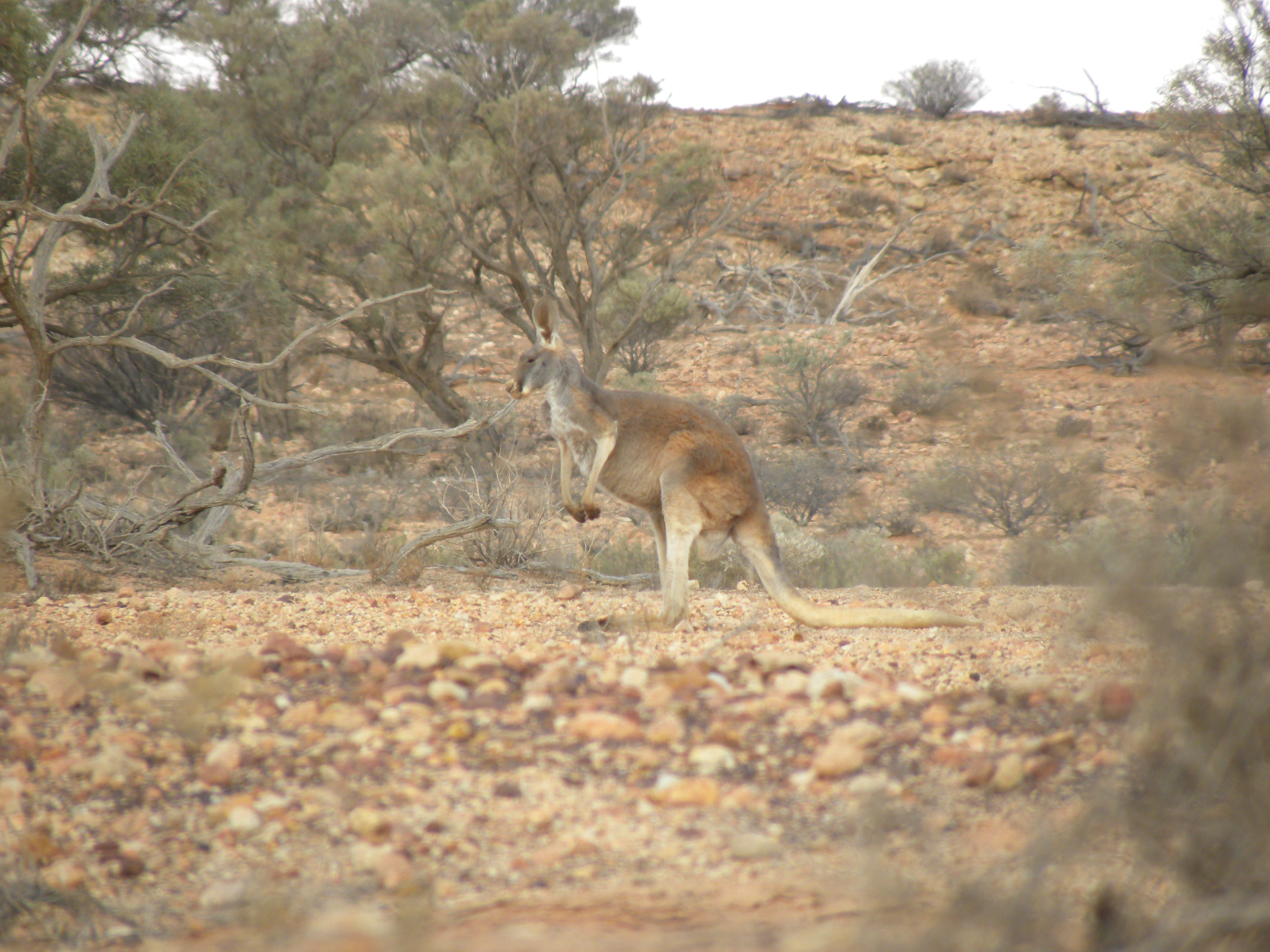
Red kangaroo (Macropus rufus)

The park supports a variety of different fauna typical of the arid zone of Australia. Prominent macropod species found in the park include red kangaroo (Macropus rufus), eastern grey kangaroo (M. gigantius), western grey kangaroo (M. fuliginosus) and euro (M. robustus). There are also a number of vulnerable mammal species listed under the NSW Threatened Species Conservation Act (NSW TSC Act) that have been recorded in the park. They are yellow-bellied sheath-tailed bat (Saccolaimus flaviventris), little pied bat (Chalinilobus picatus), inland forest bat (Vespadelus baverstocki) and stripe-faced dunnart (Sminthopsis crassicaudata).

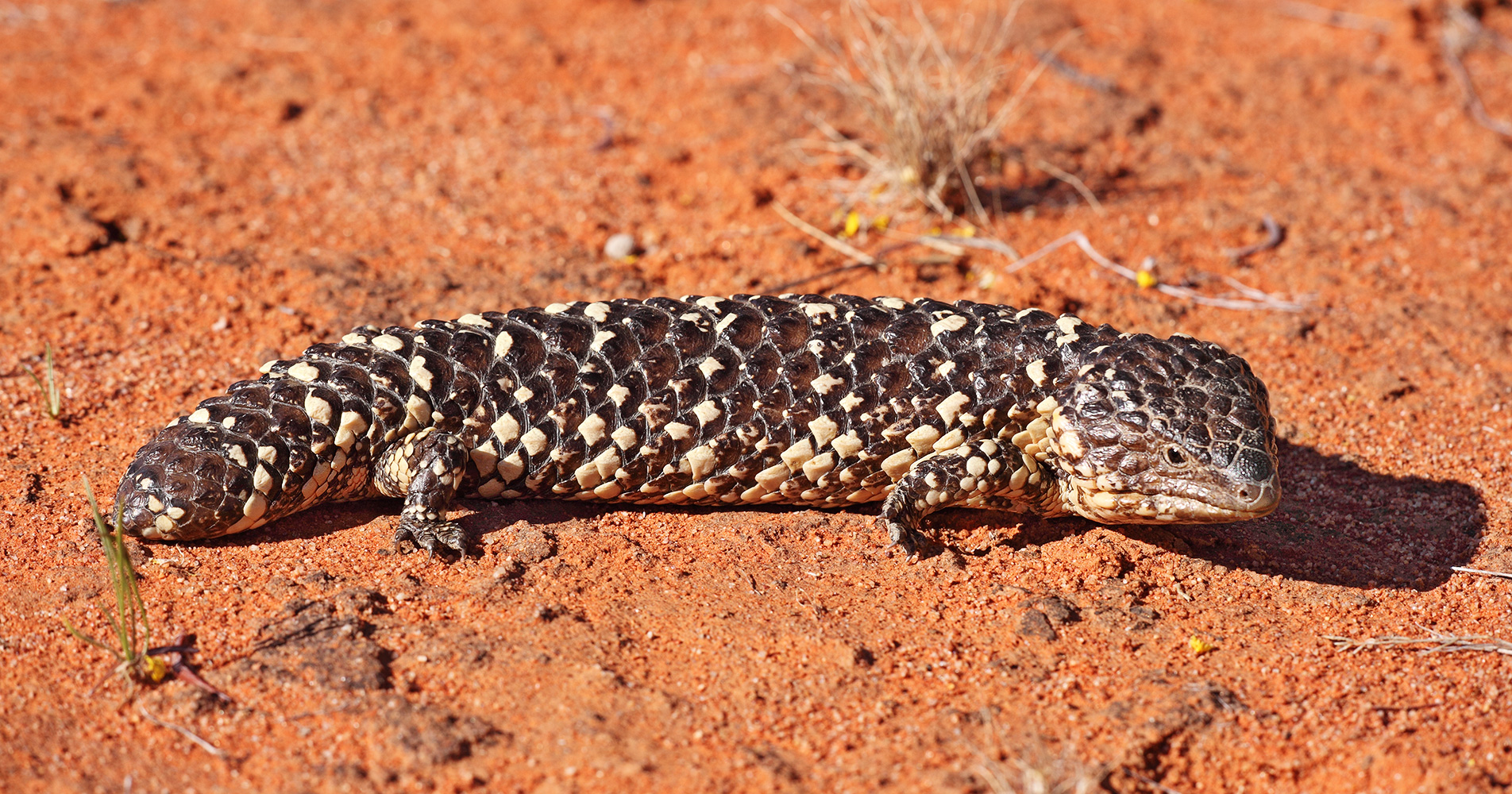
Shingleback (Tiliqua rugosa)

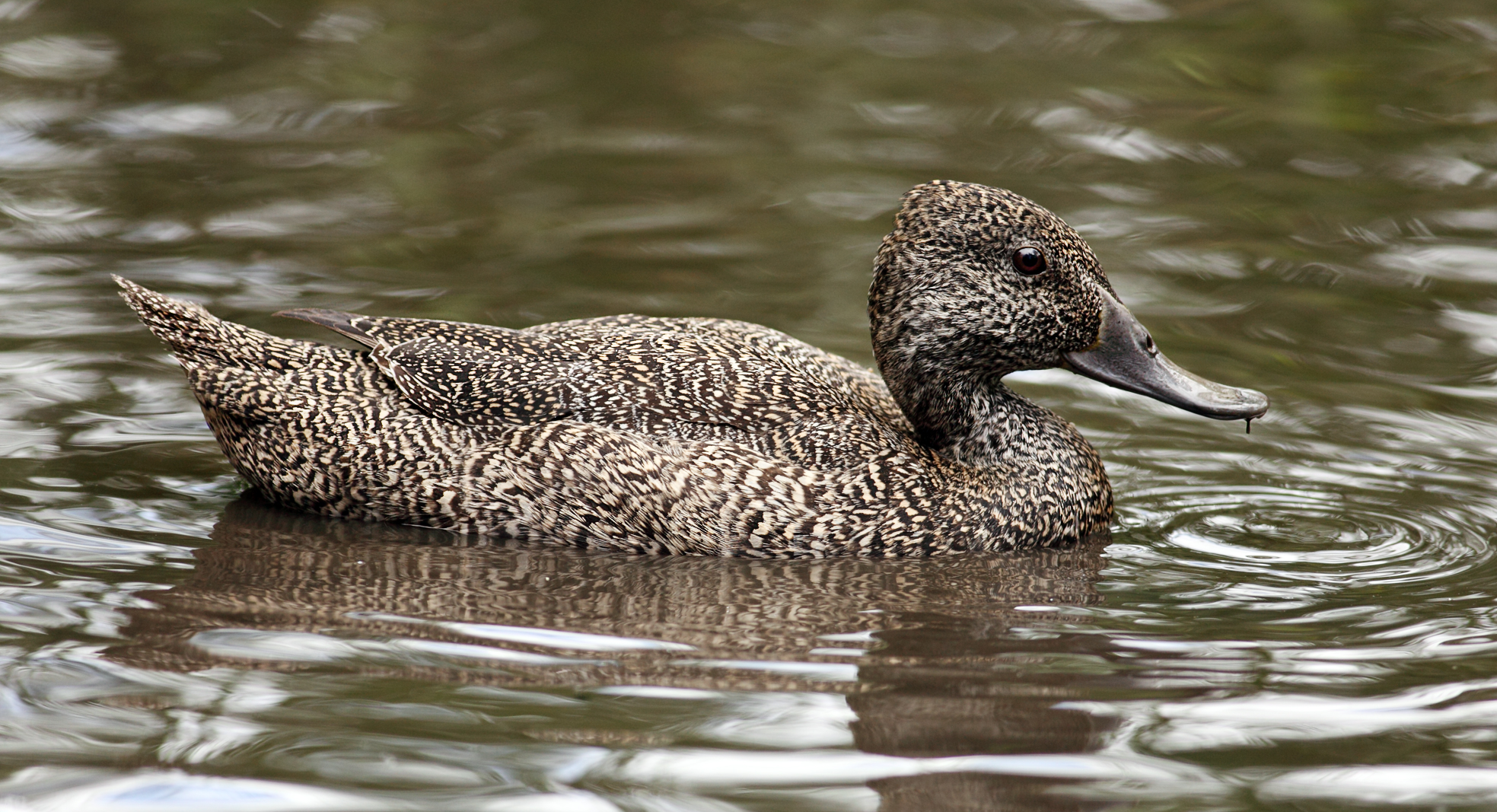
Freckled duck (Stictonetta naevosa)

Surveys conducted by the Australian Museum and Australian Herpetological Society in 2001 and 2002 recorded 44 species of reptiles and 8 species of amphibians. These include the wedgesnout ctenotus (Ctenotus brooksi) and crowned gecko (Lucasium stenodactylum) which are listed as vulnerable under the NSW TSC Act. Other species recorded included the lace monitor (Varanus varius), shingleback (Tiliqua rugosa), carpet python (Morelia spilota metcalfei) and mulga snake (Pseudechis australis).

The wetlands located in the park are important in the region because they provide a refuge for many species during times of drought. After floods when the lakes are full they are able to support large numbers of aquatic species and waterbirds. Aerial surveys counted 35900 waterbirds comprising 42 species on Peery Lake in 1993 and 28000 waterbirds comprising 35 species on Poloko Lake in 1990. The numbers of waterbirds that the lake supports is highly variable fluctuating in response to water levels. Peery and Poloko Lake also provide important habitat for migratory shorebirds that are covered by international bird agreements JAMBA, CAMBA and ROKAMBA. There have been five waterbird species listed under the NSW TSC Act recorded in the park. They are freckled duck (Stictonetta naevosa), blue-billed duck (Oxyura australis), brolga (Grus rubicunda), painted snipe (Rostratula benghalensis), and black-tailed godwit (Limosa limosa).

=== Flora ===
The park supports a wide diversity of vegetation. A total of 424 vascular plant species have been recorded in the park. There are 20 vegetation communities in the park with the most widespread being mulga tall shrubland/tall open shrubland, Eremophila / Dodonaea / Acacia open shrubland and black bluebush (Maireana pyramidata) low open shrubland.

The park supports two threatened ecological communities listed as endangered under the NSW TSC Act. They are artesian mound springs and nelia (Acacia loderi) woodland. Artesian mound springs are also listed as threatened under the Commonwealth Environmental Protection and Biodiversity Act (EPBC Act). The park supports one nationally threatened plant species salt pipewort (Eriocaulun carsonii), which is listed as endangered under the EPBC Act, and four plant species (Nitella partita, Dysphania platycarpa, Eriocaulon carsonii, Dentella minutissima) that are listed as endangered under the NSW TSC Act. The salt pipewort is considered to be one of the rarest vascular plant species in NSW with the only population in NSW occurring in the Lake Peery mound springs.

=== Artesian mound springs ===
Artesian mound springs form when water from the Great Artesian Basin reaches the surface through cracks in the overlying rock. As this water evaporates it deposits salts and sediments which form the characteristic mounds that the springs are named after. Mound springs provide an important source of permanent water in arid regions. Mound springs are a threatened community because they occupy a specialised habitat being restricted to locations where artesian water comes to the surface. Without this water many of the species living in these communities could not survive in the arid environment. This specialised habitat requirement also means that the species occupying this habitat often have small populations with little connectivity between the populations. Artesian mound springs are considered to be the rarest landform in Australia.

There are several examples of mound springs located on the bed of Lake Peery. These form the largest active mound spring complex in NSW and are the only known springs in NSW that are on a lakebed. These mound springs are also the only examples that are protected within the reserve system of NSW. The mound springs at Lake Peery are culturally significant for local Aboriginal people as they were a secure and permanent source of freshwater and feature in the local dreamtime stories. Salt pipewort is restricted to active artesian mound springs. In NSW salt pipewort has only been recorded in two locations, Lake Peery and Wee Watah Springs. The population at Wee Watah Springs has become extinct due to stock trampling meaning that the remaining populations of salt pipewort in NSW are all located within the park.

One of the main threats to the mound springs comes from the extraction of water from the Great Artesian Basin for pastoral use. This leads to a loss of aquifer pressure causing lower spring flows. Almost all of the mound springs in western New South Wales are now extinct due to loss of aquifer pressure. The other main threat to the mound springs in the park comes from trampling and grazing from feral species such as goats (Capra hircus) and rabbits (Oryctolagus cuniculus) and from rooting by feral pigs (Sus scrofa). Feral pigs can be particularly destructive for mound springs as they dig up the ground searching for roots and tubers.

=== Environmental threats ===
Introduced species, both plant and animal, are a threat to the park's biodiversity. A total of 55 introduced plant species have been recorded in the park. The priority weed species for the park are Bathurst burr (Xanthium spinosum), Noogoora burr (Xanthium occidentale) and African boxthorn (Lycium ferocissimum). These species can affect the survival of native species through competition and changing the composition of plant communities. Introduced foxes (Vulpes vulpes) and feral cats (Felis catus) are a threat to many small vertebrate species in the park that they prey on. These species contributed to the regional extinction of many vertebrate species and remain a key threatening process for many vertebrates in Australia's arid zone. Over much of the arid zone in Australia grazing by domestic stock and feral species such as rabbits and goats has resulted in modification in the structure and composition of plant communities. The park was previously used for grazing which effected the plant communities through increased erosion and reduced recruitment and establishment of species such as lignum (Muehlenbeckia florulenta). Rabbits, feral goats and domestic stock from neighbouring pastoral properties continue to pose a threat to the ecosystems in the park. Introduced fish such as European carp (Cyprinus carpio) threaten the aquatic ecosystems in the park as they compete with and prey on native species.

One of the main threats to the integrity of the wetlands in the park comes from possible future regulation of flows of the Paroo River flows. The ecosystems of the wetlands of the Paroo River are adapted to the highly variable flow regime that is characteristic of this river. Changes to this naturally variable flow regime will impact on the ecological characteristics and the extent of these wetland ecosystems. These impacts could include genetic isolation of populations, fragmentation of breeding populations, removal of breeding cues for waterbird and fish species, changed species composition and loss of habitat diversity. The natural flow regime could be affected by water extraction or by the building of levee banks which divert flows.

Climate change poses a threat to ecosystems across Australia. Predictions for changes to the climate in western NSW include higher temperatures, lower average rainfall but an increase in high intensity rainfall events, changes in rainfall patterns, increased lightning frequency and higher evaporation rates. These changes can lead to increases in fire frequency and intensity, increased droughts, reduced river runoff and water availability and increased flood intensity. Climate change poses a threat to the biodiversity of the park by changing population size and distribution and altering the species composition of ecosystems. The effects of climate change can compound other environmental threats in the park such as feral animal pressures. Changes to the flow regime of the Paroo River due to climate change could have negative impacts on the wetlands in the park.

== Management ==
Conservation reserves play an important role in the conservation of biodiversity in arid Australia. This park fills a need for protected areas within the Mulga Lands Bioregion. The park is managed by NSW National Parks and Wildlife Service in co-operation with the Paroo-Darling National Park Elders Council. Management of the park focuses on controlling introduced species and maintaining appropriate fire regimes.

Management of introduced species focuses on species that are declared noxious and species which have a significant environmental effect. Rabbits are controlled by identification and destruction of warrens. Feral goats are mustered by contractors. Feral pigs are controlled by aerial shooting and foxes are controlled by baiting programs. Where possible, feral animal control is conducted in conjunction with adjoining landholders to maximise effectiveness.

Historically fire has played a role in shaping many of the ecosystems in Australia. In arid regions fire plays a role in vegetation structure and species composition. Changed fire regimes such as increases in intensity or frequency of fires can have negative impacts on biodiversity values. Fires are managed within the park to conserve biodiversity as well as to protect property and Aboriginal sites. Prescribed burning is conducted to manage fuel loads and to mimic historic Aboriginal burning patterns.

== Access ==
The national park can be accessed via dry weather roads, from the villages of either White Cliffs, located, some 20 kilometres (12 mi) away, or Wilcannia. The visitor centre at White Cliffs is able to provide further up-to-date information on the Paroo-Darling National Park.

Camping is permitted at the Coach and Horses campground at the old Wilga Station which is approximately 50 kilometres (31 mi) east of Wilcannia.

== See also ==
- Protected areas of New South Wales
