= Irrigation in Australia =

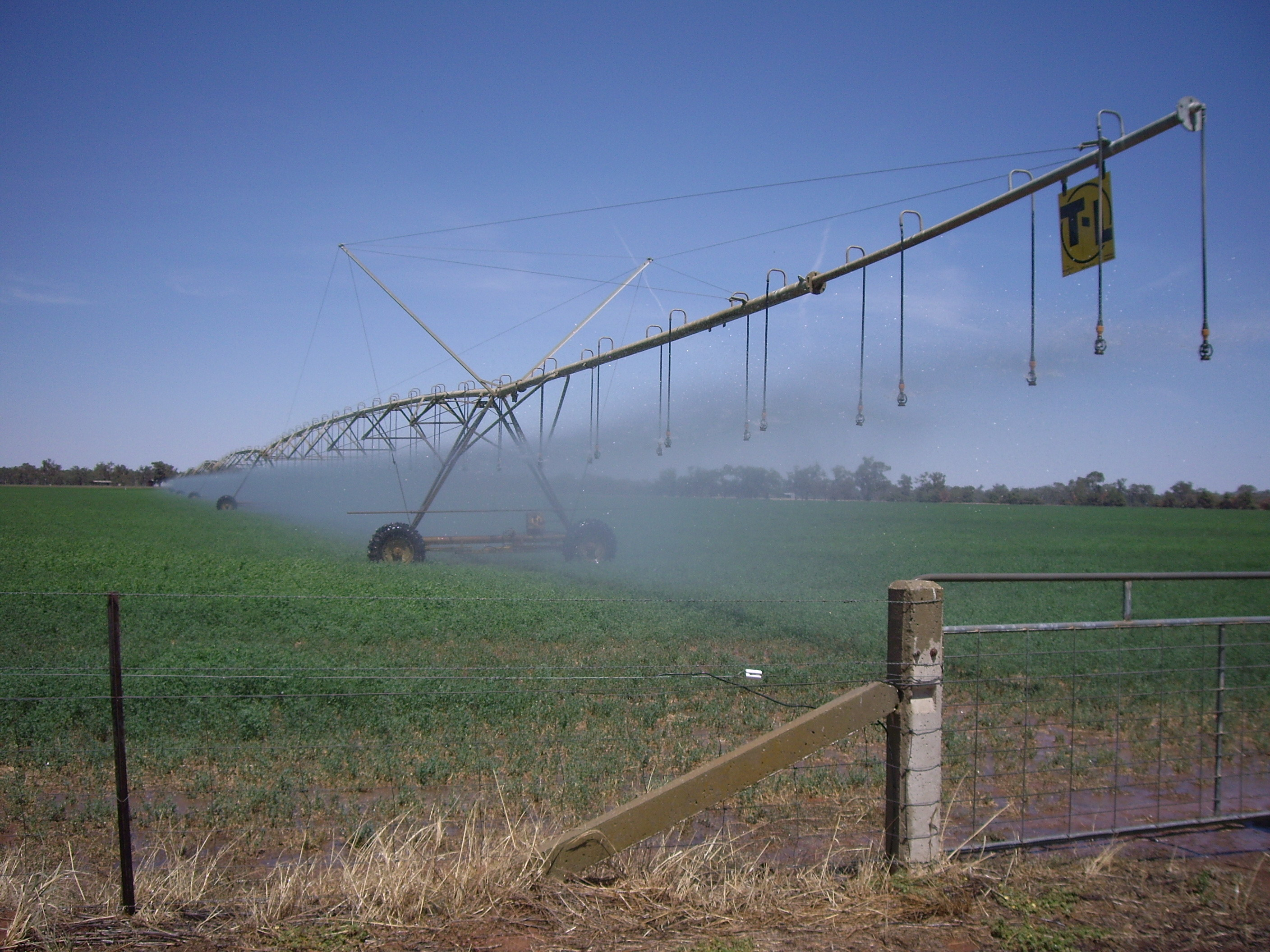
Centre pivot irrigation near Euberta in the Riverina region of New South Wales

Irrigation is a widespread practice required in many areas of Australia, the driest inhabited continent, to supplement low rainfall with water from other sources to assist in growing crops and pasture. Overuse or poor management of irrigation is held responsible by some for environmental problems such as soil salinity and loss of habitat for native flora and fauna.

Irrigation differs from dryland farming (farming relying on rainfall) in Australia in its level of intensity and production. It is a far more economically productive land use than dryland farming. Common crops produced using irrigation include rice, cotton, canola, sugar, various fruits, and other tree crops, and pasture, hay, and grain for beef and dairy production. Surface irrigation is Australia's most common irrigation method, with drip and center pivots also utilised. All rights to use and control water are vested in the state, which issues conditional entitlements for water use.

The first large-scale irrigation schemes in Australia were introduced during the 1880s, partially in response to drought. In 1915, the River Murray Waters Agreement was signed, setting out basic conditions for the river's water use which remain in force today. Towards the end of the 20th century, environmental problems in the basin became serious as diversions for irrigation approached or exceeded the capacity of natural flows. Following negotiations beginning in 1985, the Murray–Darling Basin Agreement was signed in 1987. The more comprehensive National Water Initiative was adopted in 2004.

== Water sources ==
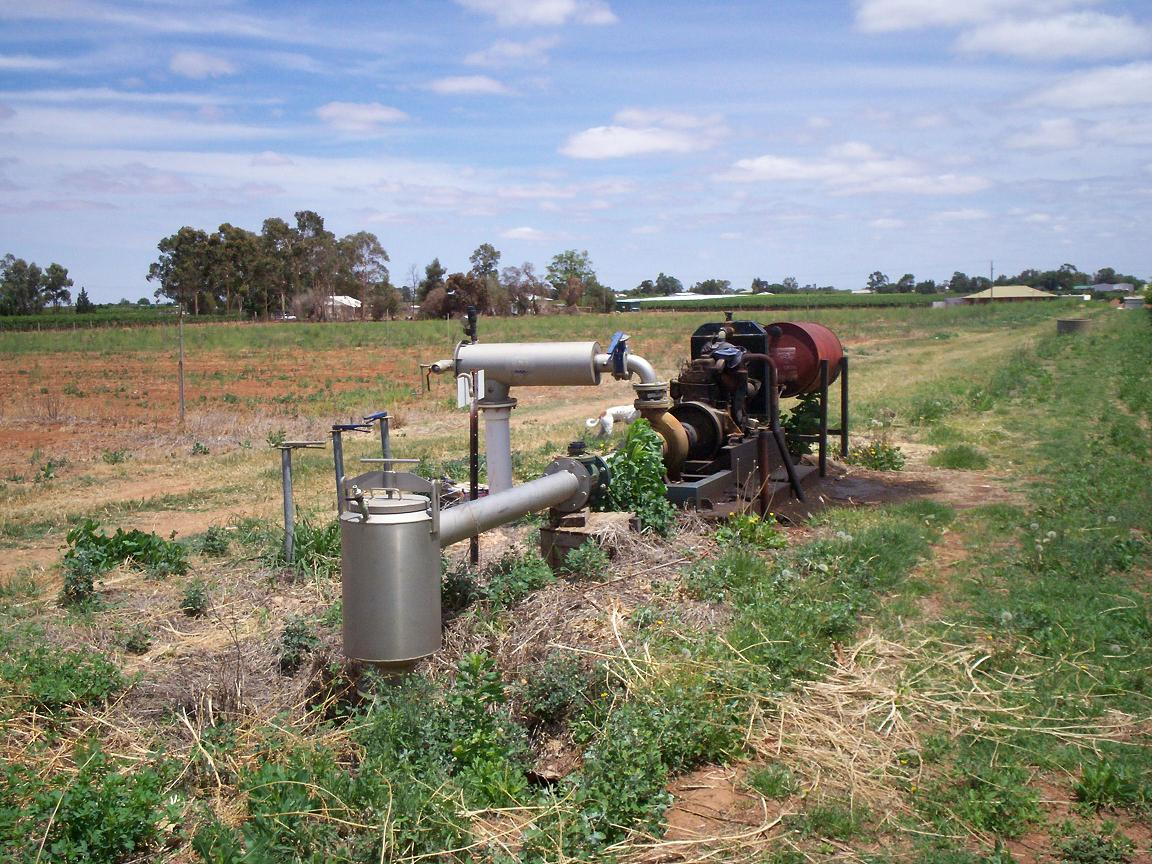
A diesel irrigation pump in Mildura, Victoria.

In general, water for irrigation comes from two main sources: river systems and underground aquifers. Major river systems used for irrigation in Australia include the Murray-Darling system, the Ord River in the Kimberley region of Western Australia, and many rivers along the east coast of Australia, including the Burdekin River Irrigation Area in North Queensland, where irrigation is used during the dry season for double-cropping. A major source of groundwater in Australia is the Great Artesian Basin.

Although the Murray-Darling Basin receives only 6% of Australia's annual rainfall, over 70% of Australia's irrigation resources are concentrated there, which makes up around 90% of the resources in the basin. It contains 42% of the nation's farmland and produces 40% of its food.

== History ==
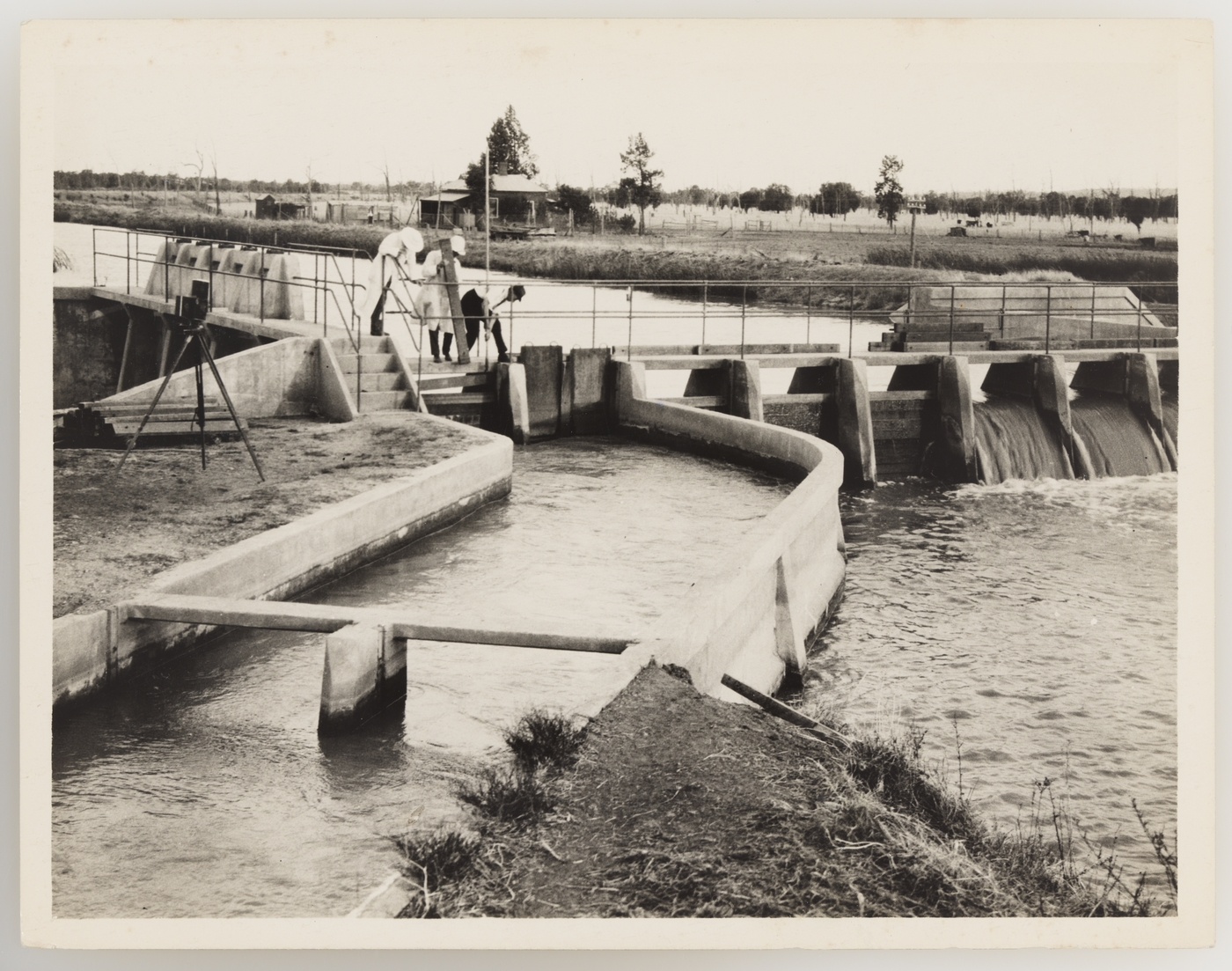
Irrigation in New South Wales during the 1920s

The first schemes for irrigation commenced in the latter half of the nineteenth century. Goulburn Weir, constructed from 1887 to 1891, was the first major diversion structure built for irrigation development in Australia.

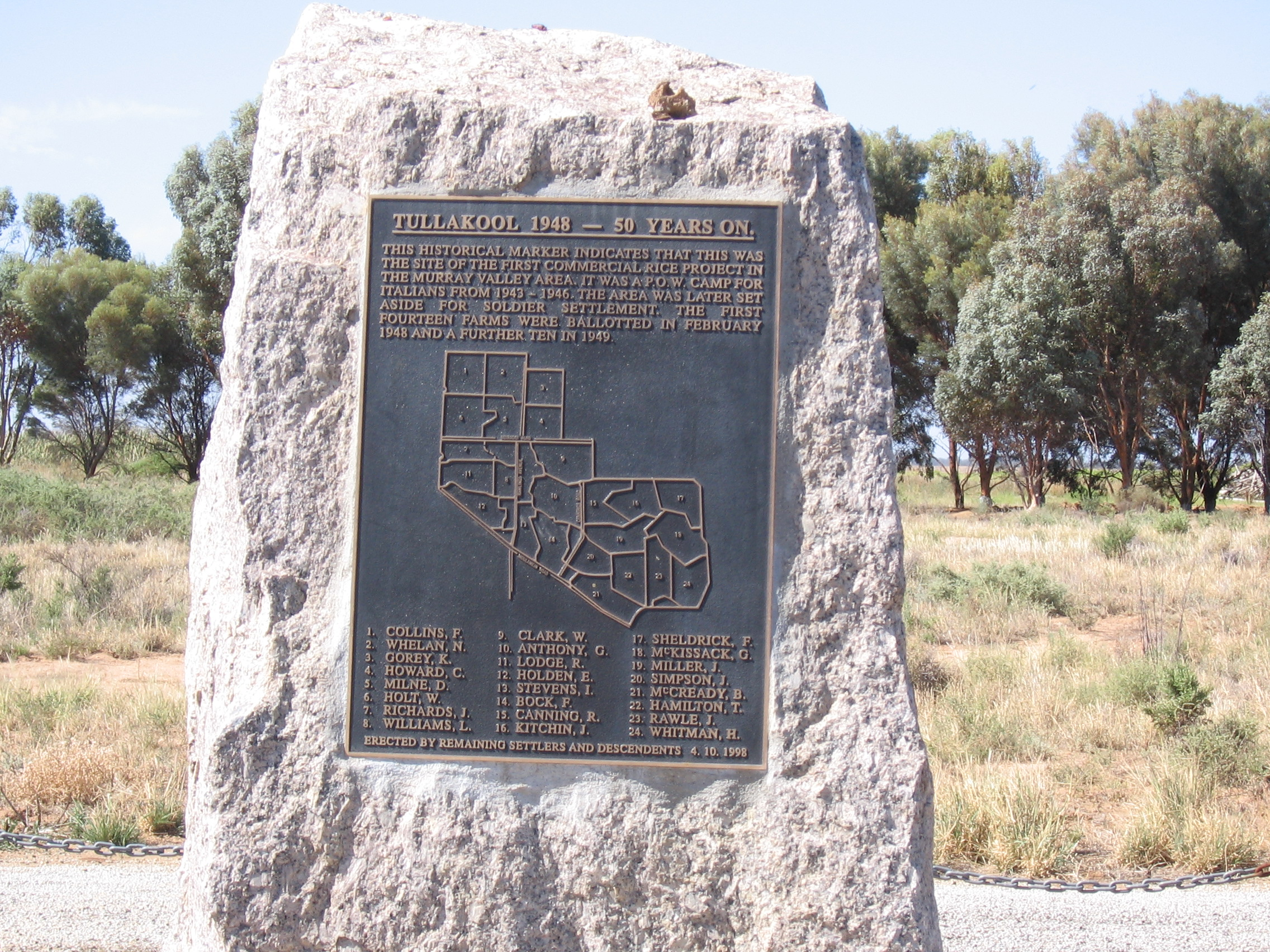
Memorial marking the site of the first commercial rice crop in the Murray valley at Tullakool, New South Wales

A major drought in Victoria from 1877 to 1884 prompted Alfred Deakin, then a minister in the State Government and chairman of a Royal Commission on water supply to visit the irrigation areas of California. There, he met the Canadian brothers George and William Chaffey, who had worked on irrigation schemes in California. In 1886, the Chaffey brothers came to Australia and selected a derelict sheep station covering 250,000 acres (1,000 km^{2}) at Mildura as the site for their first irrigation settlement. They signed an agreement with the Victorian government to spend at least A£300,000 on permanent improvements at Mildura in the next twenty years. Also in 1886/87, the Chaffey brothers were invited by John Downer, the Premier of South Australia, to commence a settlement at Renmark, South Australia.

The Dethridge wheel, used for measuring the flow of water delivered to individual farms was developed in 1910.

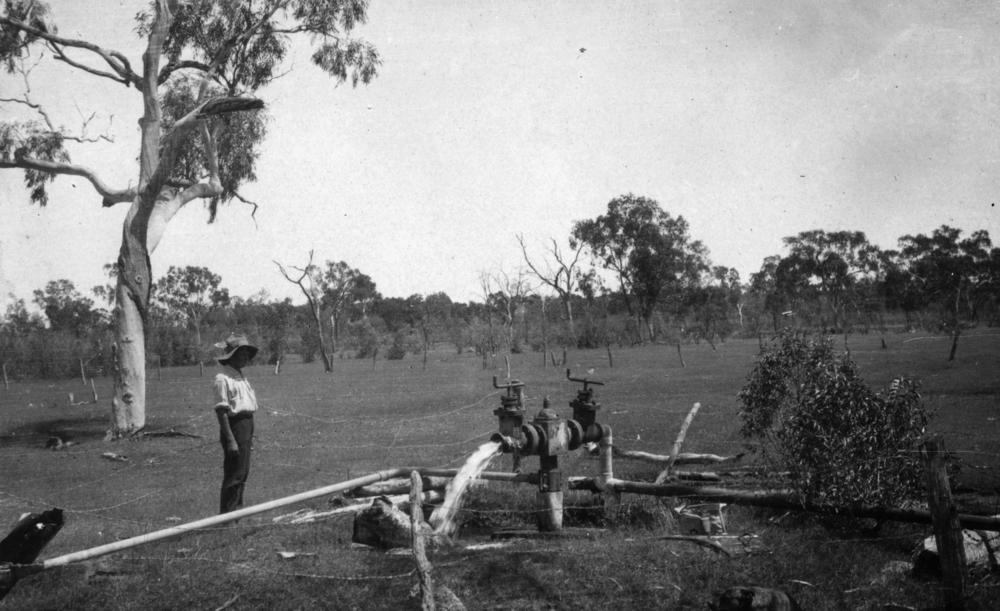
Artesian bore near Barcaldine in Queensland, 1924

Irrigation in the Murrumbidgee valley began with the irrigation experiments of agricultural pioneer, Samuel McCaughey at North Yanco station in 1900. This private scheme involved the construction of around 320 kilometres of channels in irrigating about 162 square kilometres (63 sq mi) of land. McCaughey's success appeared to have encouraged the New South Wales government to commence large-scale irrigation. This process began with the Barren Jack and Murrumbidgee Canals Construction Act 1906 (Cth). Burrinjuck Dam on the Murrumbidgee River near Tumut was commenced in 1907, work commenced on the channels and the first farms were established soon after.

In 1907, the Victorian government invited American Elwood Mead to become chairman of the newly formed State Rivers and Water Supply Commission of Victoria. The high hopes for government-controlled irrigation in Victoria owed much to Deakin's earlier efforts, who now as Prime Minister, expected Mead to advise at both national and state levels. Mead was not content with proposing only higher water rates in attempting to recover maintenance, management, and construction costs. He also insisted on the logical extension, which demanded higher-yielding uses of water and land. The Water Act 1909 was passed despite the fierce opposition of large landowners, and Mead's influence on rural development was greatly increased by his assumption of overriding control in the planning of closer settlement in Victoria's irrigation districts. Mead claimed much credit for the hierarchical arrangement of allotment sizes which characterized these designs, but his impact was rather in the very scale and complexity of the commission's operations, in Mead's salesmanship, and in the bureaucratic web in which the new settlers became enmeshed. Mead worked in Australia full-time for four years, but his involvement would continue until his resignation became effective in May 1915; this professional experience consolidated Mead's international reputation. In 1923, Mead's four-month Australia advisory tour was punctuated by disputes with Joseph Carruthers and leading irrigation authorities in New South Wales over the selection and use of land in the Murrumbidgee Irrigation Area. Mead rejected plans for further fruit planting, advocating larger dairy farms and improved co-ordination of grazing and irrigation enterprises, which would favour stock fattening and the intensive production of lucerne.

In Western Australia, the state's first controlled irrigation scheme, the Harvey Irrigation Scheme, was officially started in 1916. It was further developed during the latter part of the 1930s depression to take unemployed workers to dig and build the extensive irrigation channels in the district.

== Policy ==
The management of irrigation, particularly with relation to the problems of the Murray-Darling Basin has long been a politically contentious issue in Australia.

=== The River Murray Waters Agreement ===
Regulation of the Murray River system was one of the first issues addressed after Federation. A period of drought beginning in 1895 culminated in the 'Federation drought' of 1901–2. One result was a non-government conference held in Corowa in 1902, which called for government action to manage the waters of the Murray River. A prolonged period of negotiation followed, during which the states claimed property rights over the waters of the Murray and its tributaries.

The upstream states, Victoria and New South Wales, favoured the riparian doctrine, under which landowners are free to take water from streams flowing through their property. As the 'Premier State', New South Wales, claimed riparian rights not only over its own rivers, but over the entire main stream of the Murray. South Australia relied on provisions of the newly enacted Constitution under which the Commonwealth government had authority over navigation along the Murray River and an implied obligation to preserve flows in the South Australian section of the river.

Negotiations were finally concluded in 1915. The River Murray Waters Agreement, to which the Commonwealth and the states of New South Wales, Victoria and South Australia were parties, set out the basic conditions which remain in force today:

- flow at Albury is shared equally between New South Wales and Victoria
- Victoria and New South Wales retain control of their tributaries below Albury
- Victoria and New South Wales supply South Australia with a guaranteed minimum quantity of water or "entitlement".

The agreement also provided for construction of dams, weirs and locks on the main stream of the Murray to be managed by the River Murray Commission, which was established in 1917.

Although it was an important example of cooperative federalism, the River Murray Waters Agreement was limited to the management of water for irrigation and navigation.

=== The Murray–Darling Basin Agreement ===
As diversions for irrigation approached or exceeded the capacity of the Murray–Darling river system, and environmental problems became more serious, the need for a coordinated approach to management of the Basin as a whole became more evident. Following negotiations beginning in 1985 the Murray–Darling Basin Agreement was signed in 1987. In its initial form, it was as an amendment to the River Murray Waters Agreement. Five years later, in 1992, a totally new Murray–Darling Basin Agreement was signed, replacing the River Murray Waters Agreement. The Agreement was given full legal status by the Murray–Darling Basin Act 1993 which was passed by all the contracting governments. Queensland and the Australian Capital Territory later joined the agreement.

The stated purpose of the Murray–Darling Basin Agreement was 'to promote and coordinate effective planning and management for the equitable, efficient and sustainable use of the water, land and other environmental resources of the Murray–Darling Basin'

To achieve this, the Agreement established new institutions at the political, bureaucratic and community levels. These were:

- the Murray–Darling Basin Ministerial Council (MDBMC);
- the Murray–Darling Basin Commission (MDBC); and
- the Community Advisory Committee (CAC).

=== The National Water Initiative ===
The lack of satisfactory progress under the Murray–Darling Basin Agreement and the emergence of a variety of water policy problems elsewhere in Australia led to the adoption of the National Water Initiative in 2004. Key elements of the Initiative included promotion of water trading and a commitment to restore at least 500 gigalitres of environmental flows to the Murray Darling Basin

== Production ==
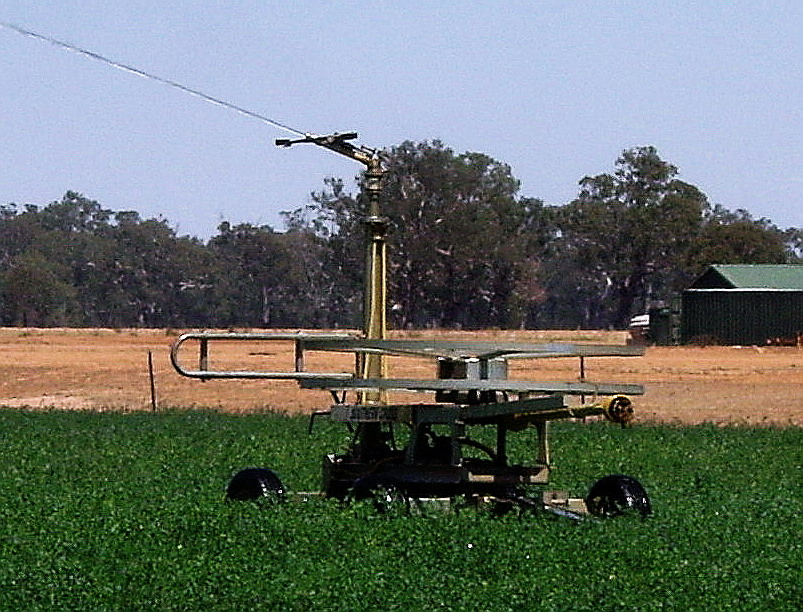
Close up of an Impact (Knocker) Sprinkler in use on a fodder crop

Water consumption by the agriculture industry was 12,780 gigalitres (2,810×10^{9} imp gal; 3,380×10^{9} US gal) in 2012-13, accounting for 65% of total water consumption in Australia during that period. Irrigation/rural water providers were the main suppliers of distributed water in 2004-05 accounting for 6,637 gigalitres (1,460×10^{9} imp gal; 1,753×10^{9} US gal) or 59% of Australia's total distributed water supply. Since 2005 climatic conditions and reduced allocations have caused the total water consumed to decline by 30% from the 2004-2005 figure down to 8,521 gigalitres (1,874×10^{9} imp gal; 2,251×10^{9} US gal) in 2006-2007 and further to 7,286 gigalitres (1,603×10^{9} imp gal; 1,925×10^{9} US gal) in 2008-2009. The total gross value of irrigated agricultural production in 2012-13 was A$13,431 million up from A$9,076 million in 2004-05 and A$9,618 million in 2000-01. The gross value of irrigated agricultural production represents around a quarter (23%) of the gross value of agricultural commodities produced in Australia in 2004-05, on less than 1% of agricultural land.

Common crops produced using irrigation include rice, cotton, canola, sugar, various fruits and other tree crops and pasture, hay and grain for use in beef and dairy production.

Gross value of irrigated agricultural production	2000-01 A$M	2004-05 A$M	2012-13 A$M
Dairy farming	1,499	1,632	1,908
Vegetables	1,817	1,761	2,746
Sugar	284	477	599
Fruit	1,590	1,777	2,801
Grapes	1,355	1,314	1,074
Cotton	1,222	908	1,789
Rice	350	102	302
Nurseries, cut flowers & turf	763	737	845
Livestock, pasture, grains & other	737	367	
Total	9,618	9,076	13,431

=== Cotton ===
Major cotton growing areas in Australia are:

- New South Wales - Mungindi, Gwydir River, Walgett, Bourke, the Lower and Upper Namoi River, Macquarie River, Menindee, Lachlan River and Murrumbidgee River
- Queensland - Central Highlands, Dawson Valley, Biloela, Darling Downs, Dirranbandi, St George, Macintyre Valley

In 2001/02 crop size was 420,170 hectares (1,038,300 acres) producing 3,041,000 bales. Estimates for 2006/07 were for 142,032 hectares (350,970 acres) producing cotton, a 66% reduction, producing a forecast crop of 1,171,765 bales, a 61% reduction. The total gross value of irrigated agricultural production in the cotton industry in 2004-05 was A$908 million compared to A$1,222 million in 2000-01. While demand skyrocketed, actual water use by the cotton industry fell by 37% between 2000/01 and 2004/05, due mainly to drought. The cotton industry used 2,896 gigalitres (637×10^{9} imp gal; 765×10^{9} US gal) in 2000/01, 1,822 gigalitres (401×10^{9} imp gal; 481×10^{9} US gal) in 2004/05 and 793 gigalitres (174×10^{9} imp gal; 209×10^{9} US gal) in 2008/09.

=== Rice ===
Irrigated areas in the Riverina produces the vast majority of rice grown in Australia, particularly in the Murrumbidgee Irrigation Area (MIA), but also the Murray Irrigation Area around Finley, Coleambally and Deniliquin areas.

Today, more than one million tonnes of Australian rice is produced each year and exported to over 70 countries, generating A$500 million in export income and supporting 63 towns in the Riverina and northern Victoria. Major rice mills are located in Leeton, Coleambally and the largest rice mill in the southern hemisphere in Deniliquin.

The total gross value of irrigated agricultural production in the rice industry in 2004-05 was A$102 million compared to A$350 million in 2000-01. Water use by the rice industry fell between 2000/01 and 2004/05, due mainly to smaller planted areas during the drought; the rice industry used 2,223 gigalitres (489×10^{9} imp gal; 587×10^{9} US gal) in 2000/01, 631 gigalitres (139×10^{9} imp gal; 167×10^{9} US gal) in 2004/05 and 101 gigalitres (22×10^{9} imp gal; 27×10^{9} US gal) in 2008/09.

=== Grapes ===
Wine, dried and table grapes are grown commercially in all states and territories. Grape production is now the largest fruit industry in Australia. Of that production wine grape production at over 1 million tonnes (980,000 long tons; 1,100,000 short tons) per annum is almost nine times the production of dried grapes and 14 times the production of table grapes.

A comparison with other grape producing countries throughout the world shows that Australia was the fourteenth largest producer of grapes in 1997.

Towards sustaining that production much of Australia’s viticulture is located in irrigable areas where water supply is reliable and well managed, with many new vineyards relying upon the availability of water pumped from rivers and streams.

The Australian grape industry used a total of 439 gigalitres (97×10^{9} imp gal; 116×10^{9} US gal) in 2006/07, equating to approximately 4.3 ML/ha.

Major grape growing areas of Australia are:

- Western Australia – Carnarvon, Swan Valley, and Margaret River, Western Australia
- Northern Territory – Ti-Tree
- South Australia – Clare Valley, Barossa Valley, the Riverland, the Adelaide Hills and the South East area of the State
- Queensland – Mareeba, Rockhampton, Charters Towers, Mundubbera, Stanthorpe, Emerald, and St George
- New South Wales – Hunter Region and Riverina
- Victoria – Sunraysia, Swan Hill and Yarra Valley
- Tasmania – Launceston

== Water trading ==
In Australia, all rights to use and control water are vested in the states. Users are then issued various conditional entitlements to use water and some of these entitlements can, in limited circumstances, be traded.

Entitlements vary state by state and according to the use, source, legal form, level of devolution, security and transferability among others. There has been a move across all states in recent years to move from older forms of water entitlement to more secure and transferable entitlements. Key parts of this move has been the separation of water entitlements from ties to particular parcels of land and the specification of entitlements with specific volumes and reliability.

Where an entitlement is able to be traded, the transaction may take several forms including temporary transfer of a seasonal water assignment, a permanent transfer of all or part of a water entitlement or a lease over a set period of years. All transfers require approval from the various regulatory bodies to ensure it complies with trading rules designed to meet environmental and in some cases socio-economic objectives. Such rules may include approving trades only within a set zone or the exchange rate of trades between zones to reflect water losses in delivery or differences in reliability.

== Methods ==
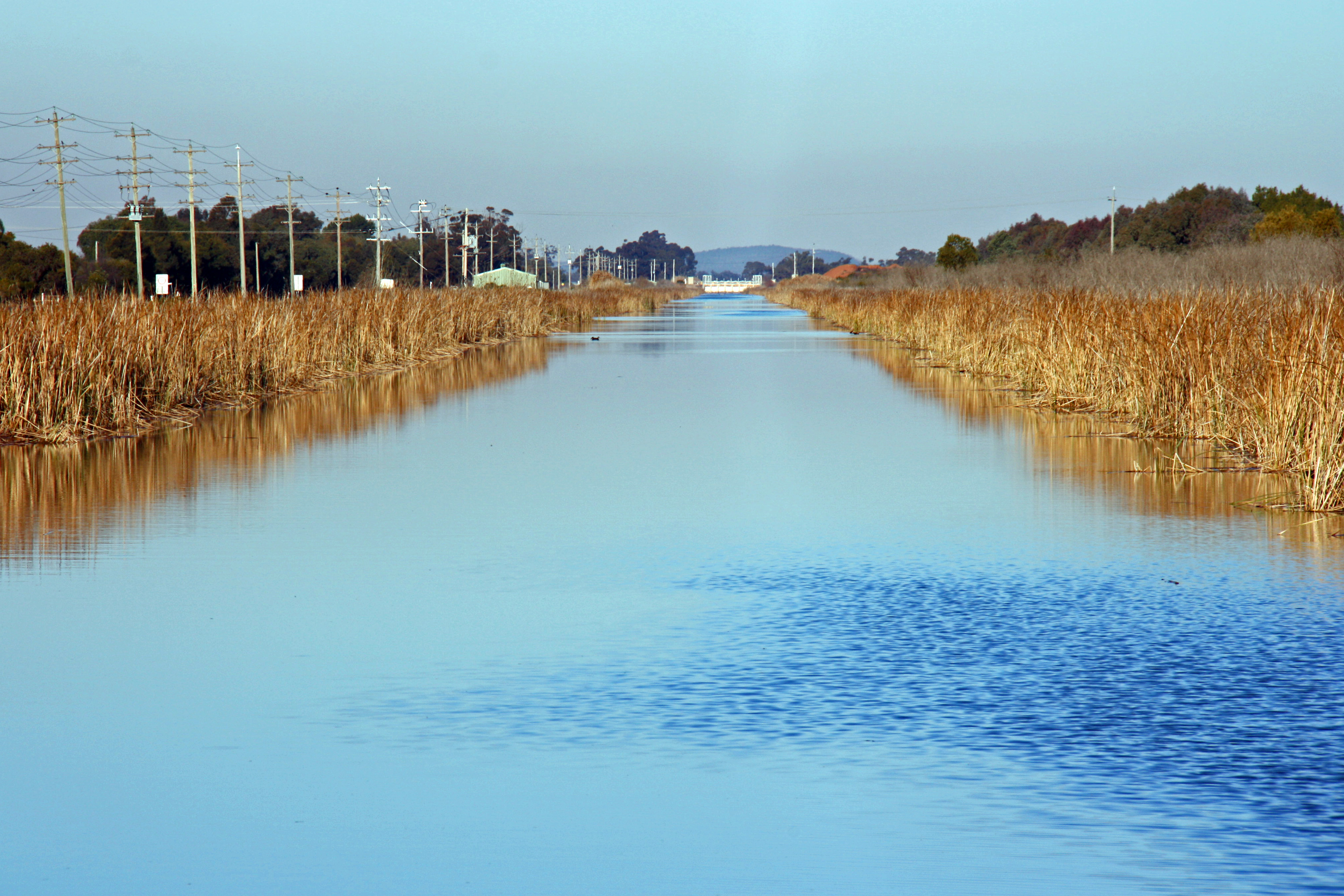
The Riverina Irrigation Channel, 2010

Irrigation methods in Australia have improved over many years allowing for more efficient production per megalitre of water used. Current methods include systems such as centre pivot irrigation, impact (knocker) sprinklers, butterfly sprinklers, drip and surface irrigation. Surface irrigation remains the most common irrigation technique accounting for 58.6% of the total area irrigated in 2013/14 compared to 10.8% for drip, 13.2% for centre pivot and lateral move machines and 4.4% for microspray systems. These values may change from season to season due to water availability and commodity prices.

Furrow irrigation is the typical choice for row crops such as cotton, sugar-cane and grains. Border-Check irrigation is the dominant technique for irrigating pasture. Centre pivots and lateral move machines are also used within row cropping and pasture/fodder crops and offer higher levels of control than furrow irrigation. Smaller scale sprinkler systems such as solid set systems with impact sprinklers are commonly used to grow vegetables and turf. Drip systems are found within most of the high value perennial horticultural crops such as grapes and fruit trees.

Centre pivot irrigation is often used for crops where the water can be distributed over a considerable period of time. In other crops where moisture stress is a complex concern, for example during the growing of cauliflower, water is required to be distributed quickly two or three specific times per day at a rate of about 140% the evaporation replacement rate and for this impact sprinklers set every 12 square metres or butterfly sprinklers set every 6 square metres are required. Drip sprinklers can be used on many spaced planting locations but typically will be found as gravity fed systems on vineyards.

Most if not all farms employ earthworks such as laser levelling to facilitate drainage and improve water use efficiency and uniformity.

== Environment ==
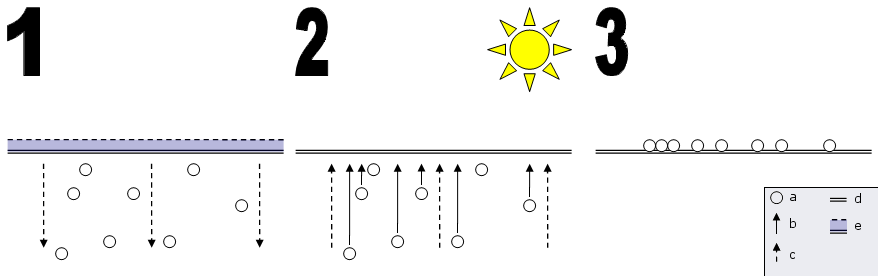
A simplified depiction of the process of increased salinity from irrigation

Overuse and poor irrigation practices have led to increased salt content in the soil, reducing the productivity of the land. Irrigation salinity is caused by water soaking through the soil level adding to the ground water below. This causes the water table to rise, bringing dissolved salts to the surface. As the irrigated area dries, the salt remains. At Wakool in the Riverina region of New South Wales, irrigation salinity is mitigated through a salt interception scheme that pumps saline ground water into evaporation basins, protecting approximately 50,000 hectares of farmland in the area from high water tables and salinity. The subsequent salt has various uses including as an animal feed supplement. The program has returned to production over 2,000 hectares of previously barren farmland and encouraged the regeneration of native eucalypts.

== See also ==
- List of dams and reservoirs in Australia
- Water security in Australia
- Water supply and sanitation in Australia
- Irrigation in viticulture
