= Darling River =

Major river in Australia

Darling River River Darling
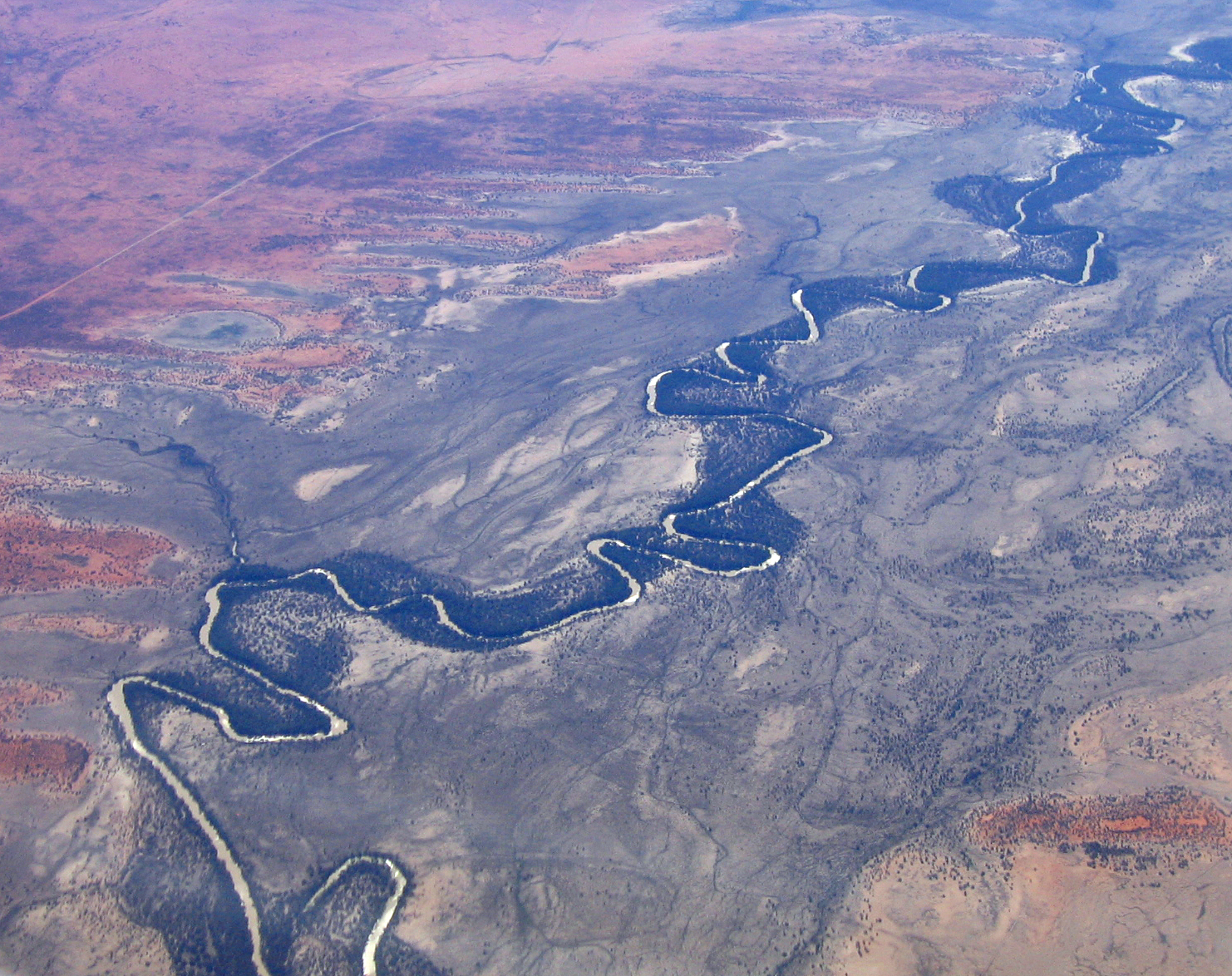
- Aerial view of the Darling River near Menindee
- Native name: Barka (Paakantyi)

Location
- Country: Australia
- State: New South Wales
- Cities: Bourke, Wilcannia, Menindee, Wentworth

Physical characteristics
- Source: confluence of Barwon and Culgoa Rivers
  - location: near Brewarrina, NSW
  - coordinates: 29°57′31″S 146°18′28″E
  - elevation: 119 m (390 ft)
- Mouth: confluence with Murray River
  - location: Wentworth, NSW
  - coordinates: 34°6′47″S 141°54′43″E
  - elevation: 35 m (115 ft)
- Length: 1,472 km (915 mi)
- Basin size: 609,283 km^{2} (235,245 sq mi)
- Discharge
  - average: 100 m^{3}/s (3,500 cu ft/s) approx.

Basin features
- River system: Murray River, Murray-Darling basin
- Tributaries
  - left: Barwon River, Little Bogan River
  - right: Culgoa River, Warrego River, Paroo River

The Darling River (or River Darling; Paakantyi: Baaka or Barka), is the third-longest river in Australia, measuring 1,472 kilometres (915 mi) from its source in northern New South Wales to its confluence with the Murray River at Wentworth. Including its longest contiguous tributaries, it is 2,844 km (1,767 mi) long, making it the longest river system in Australia. The Darling River is the outback's most famous waterway.

As of the early 2020s, the Darling is in poor health, suffering from over-allocation of its waters to irrigation, pollution from pesticide runoff, and prolonged drought. During drought periods in 2019 it barely flowed at all. The river has a high salt content and declining water quality. Increased rainfall in its catchment in 2010 improved its flow, but the health of the river will depend on long-term management.

The Division of Darling, Division of Riverina-Darling, Electoral district of Darling and Electoral district of Lachlan and Lower Darling were named after the river.

== History ==
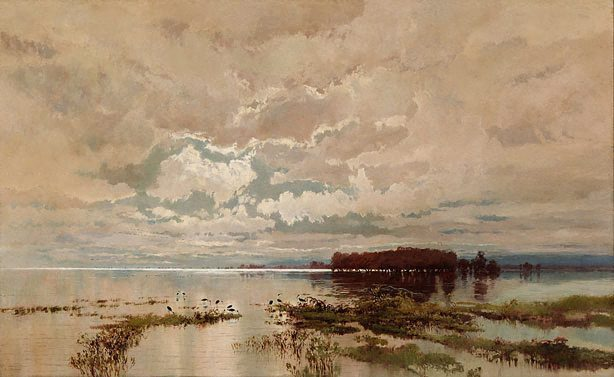
The flood in the Darling, 1890, oil on canvas by William Charles Piguenit

Aboriginal peoples have lived along the Darling River for tens of thousands of years. The Barkindji people called it Baaka or Barka, "Barkindji" meaning "people of the Barka".

The Queensland headwaters of the Darling (the area now known as the Darling Downs) were gradually colonized from 1815 onward. In 1828 the explorers Charles Sturt and Hamilton Hume were sent by the Governor of New South Wales, Sir Ralph Darling, to investigate the course of the Macquarie River. He visited the Bogan River and then, early in 1829, the upper Darling, which he named after the Governor. In 1835, Major Thomas Mitchell travelled a 483-kilometre (300 mi) portion of the Darling River. Although he did not reach its confluence with the Murray River, he believed (correctly) that it did flow into the Murray River.

In 1856, the Blandowski Expedition set off for the junction of the Darling and Murray Rivers to discover and collect fish species for the National Museum. The expedition was a success with 17,400 specimens arriving in Adelaide the next year.

Although its flow is extraordinarily irregular (the river dried up forty-five times between 1885 and 1960), in the later 19th century the Darling became a major transportation route, the pastoralists of western New South Wales using it to send their wool by shallow-draft paddle steamer from busy river ports such as Bourke and Wilcannia to the South Australian railheads at Morgan and Murray Bridge. But over the past century the river's importance as a transportation route has declined.

Large floods occurred in 1974 and 1976.

In 1992, the Darling River suffered from a severe cyanobacterial bloom that stretched the length of the river. The presence of phosphorus was essential for the toxic algae to flourish. Flow rates, turbulence, turbidity and temperature were other contributing factors.

In 2008, the Federal government purchased Toorale Station in northern New South Wales for $23 million. The purchase allowed the government to return eleven gigalitres (2.4×10^{9} imp gal; 2.9×10^{9} US gal) of environmental flows back into the Darling.

In 2019, a crisis on the Lower Darling saw up to 1 million fish die. A report by the Australia Institute said this was largely due to the decisions by the Murray-Darling Basin Authority on instructions from the New South Wales government. It said the reasons for those decisions appeared to be about building the case for the new Broken Hill pipeline and the Menindee Lakes project. Maryanne Slattery, senior water researcher with the Australia Institute; "To blame the fish kill on the drought is a cop-out, it is because water releases were made from the lakes when this simply shouldn't have happened.

A large flood occurred around Bourke in 2022.

A worse fish kill occurred in 2023. Millions of dead bony bream, golden perch and silver perch, and Murray cod flowed down the river at Menindee. The cause was low oxygen levels and high temperatures.

== Course ==
The whole Murray–Darling river system, one of the largest in the world, drains all of New South Wales west of the Great Dividing Range, much of northern Victoria and southern Queensland and parts of South Australia. Its meandering course is three times longer than the direct distance it traverses.

Much of the land that the Darling flows through are plains and is therefore relatively flat, having an average gradient of just 16 mm per kilometre. Officially the Darling begins between Brewarrina and Bourke at the confluence of the Culgoa and Barwon rivers; streams whose tributaries rise in the ranges of southern Queensland and northern New South Wales west of the Great Dividing Range. These tributaries include the Balonne River (of which the Culgoa is one of three main branches) and its tributaries; the Condamine [which rises in the Main Range about 100 km inland from Pt. Danger, on the Queensland/New South Wales border], the Macintyre River and its tributaries such as the Dumaresq River and the Severn Rivers (there are two – one on either side of the state border); the Gwydir River; the Namoi River; the Castlereagh River; and the Macquarie River. Other rivers join the Darling near Bourke or below – the Bogan River, the Warrego River and Paroo River.

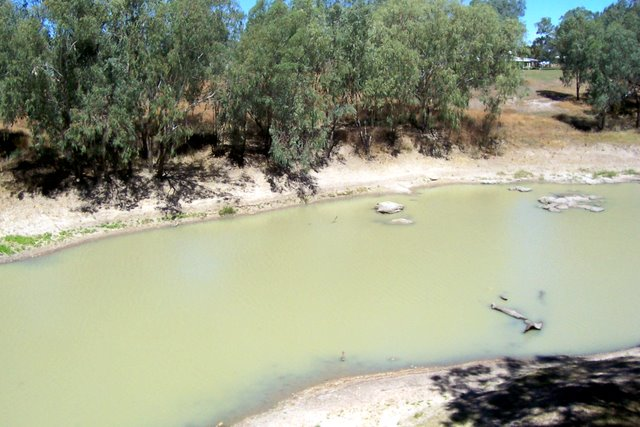
Darling River at Louth

South east of Broken Hill, the Menindee Lakes are a series of lakes that were once connected to the Darling River by short creeks. The Menindee Lake Scheme has reduced the frequency of flooding in the Menindee Lakes. As a result, about 13,800 hectares of lignum and 8,700 hectares of Black box have been destroyed. Weirs and constant low flows have fragmented the river system and blocked fish passage.

The Darling River runs south-south-west, leaving the Far West region of New South Wales, to join the Murray River on the New South Wales – Victoria border at Wentworth, New South Wales.

The Barrier Highway at Wilcannia, the Silver City Highway at Wentworth and the Broken Hill railway line at Menindee, all cross the Darling River. Part of the river north of Menindee marks the border of Kinchega National Park. In response to the 1956 Murray River flood, a weir was constructed at Menindee to mitigate flows from the Darling River.

The north of the Darling River is in the Southeast Australia temperate savanna ecoregion and the southwest of the Darling is part of the Murray Darling Depression ecoregion.

=== Population centres ===
Major settlements along the river include Brewarrina, Bourke, Louth, Tilpa, Wilcannia, Menindee, Pooncarie and Wentworth. Wentworth was Australia's busiest inland port in the late 1880s.

Navigation by steamboat to Brewarrina was first achieved in 1859. Brewarrina was also the location of intertribal meetings for Indigenous Australians who speak Darling and live in the river basin. Ancient fish traps in the river provided food for feasts. These heritage listed rock formations have been estimated at more than 40,000 years old making them the oldest man-made structure on the planet.

== In popular culture ==
Australian poet Henry Lawson wrote a well-known ironic tribute to the Darling River. To quote another Henry Lawson poem:

The skies are brass and the plains are bare,
Death and ruin are everywhere;
And all that is left of the last year's flood
Is a sickly stream on the grey-black mud;
The salt-springs bubble and the quagmires quiver,
And this is the dirge of the Darling River.

— Henry Lawson

He also wrote about the river in The Union Buries Its Dead and "Andy's Gone With Cattle". Other bush poets who have written about the river include Scots-Australian Will H. Ogilvie (1869–1963) and Breaker Morant (1864–1902).

The Australian band Midnight Oil wrote a song called "The Barka-Darling River" for their album Resist, drawing attention to the negative effects of cotton farming on the environment and people connected to the river.

== Gallery ==
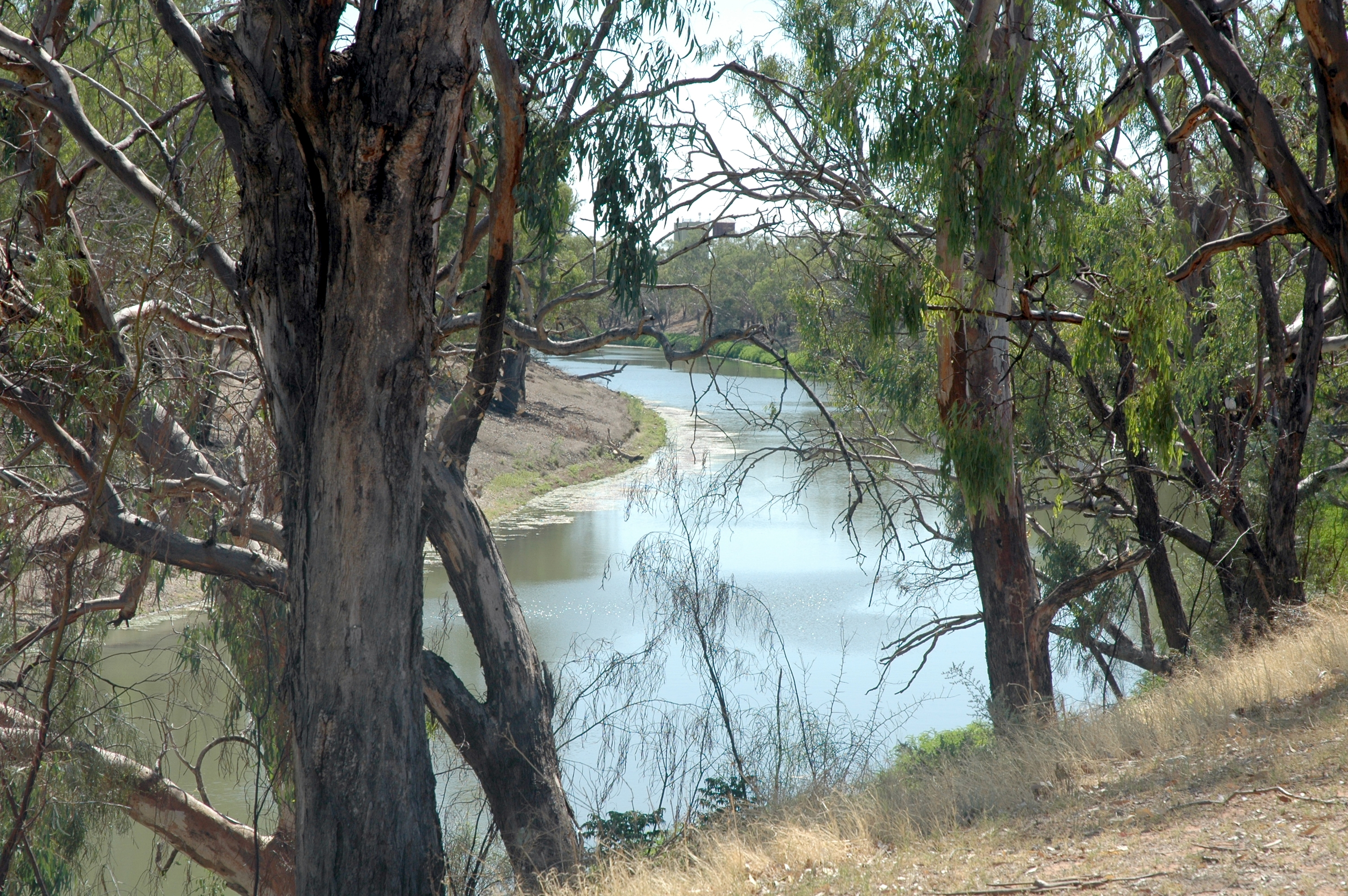
The Darling River from Bourke wharf (2010)

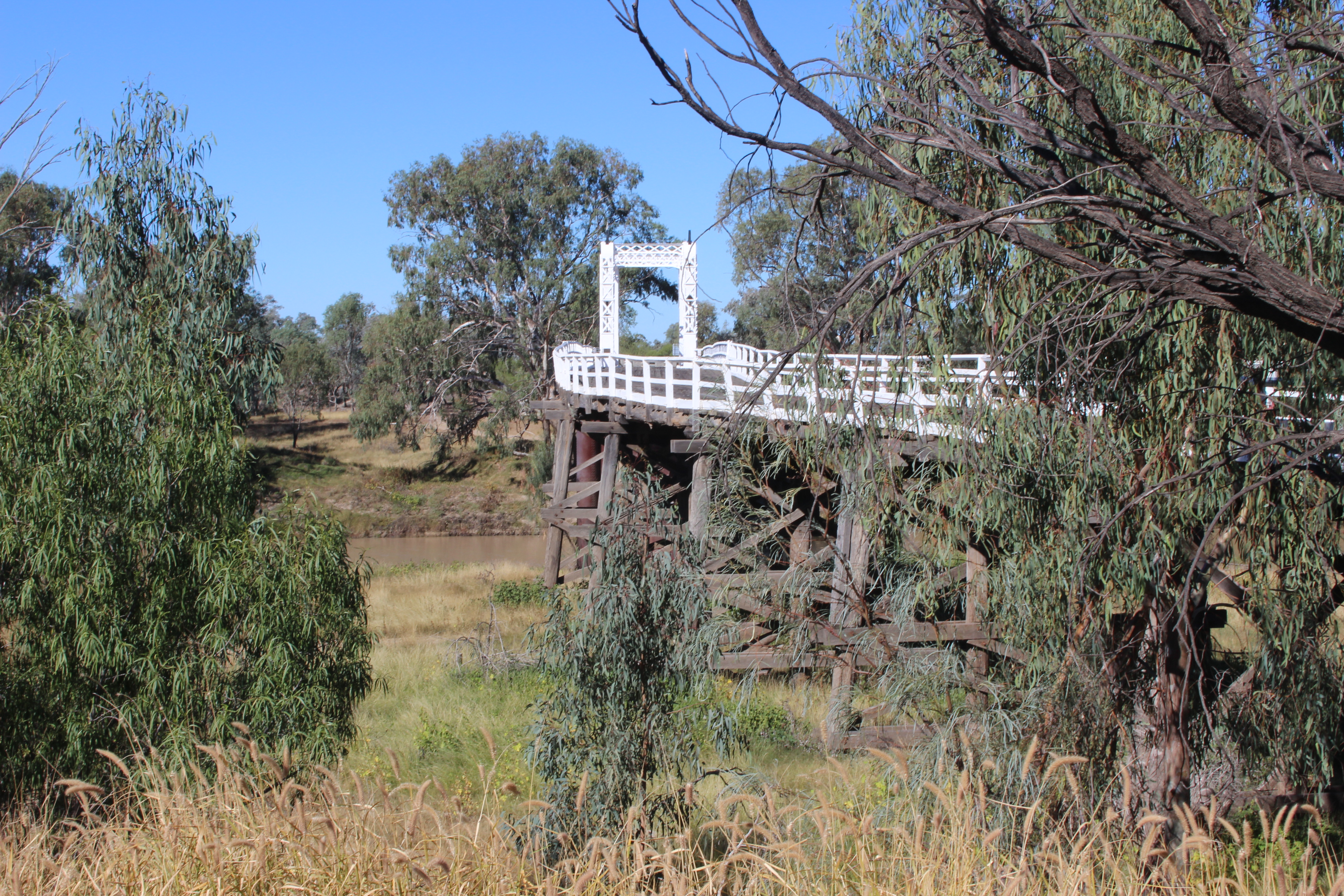
Old North Bourke Bridge, opened in 1883 (2014)

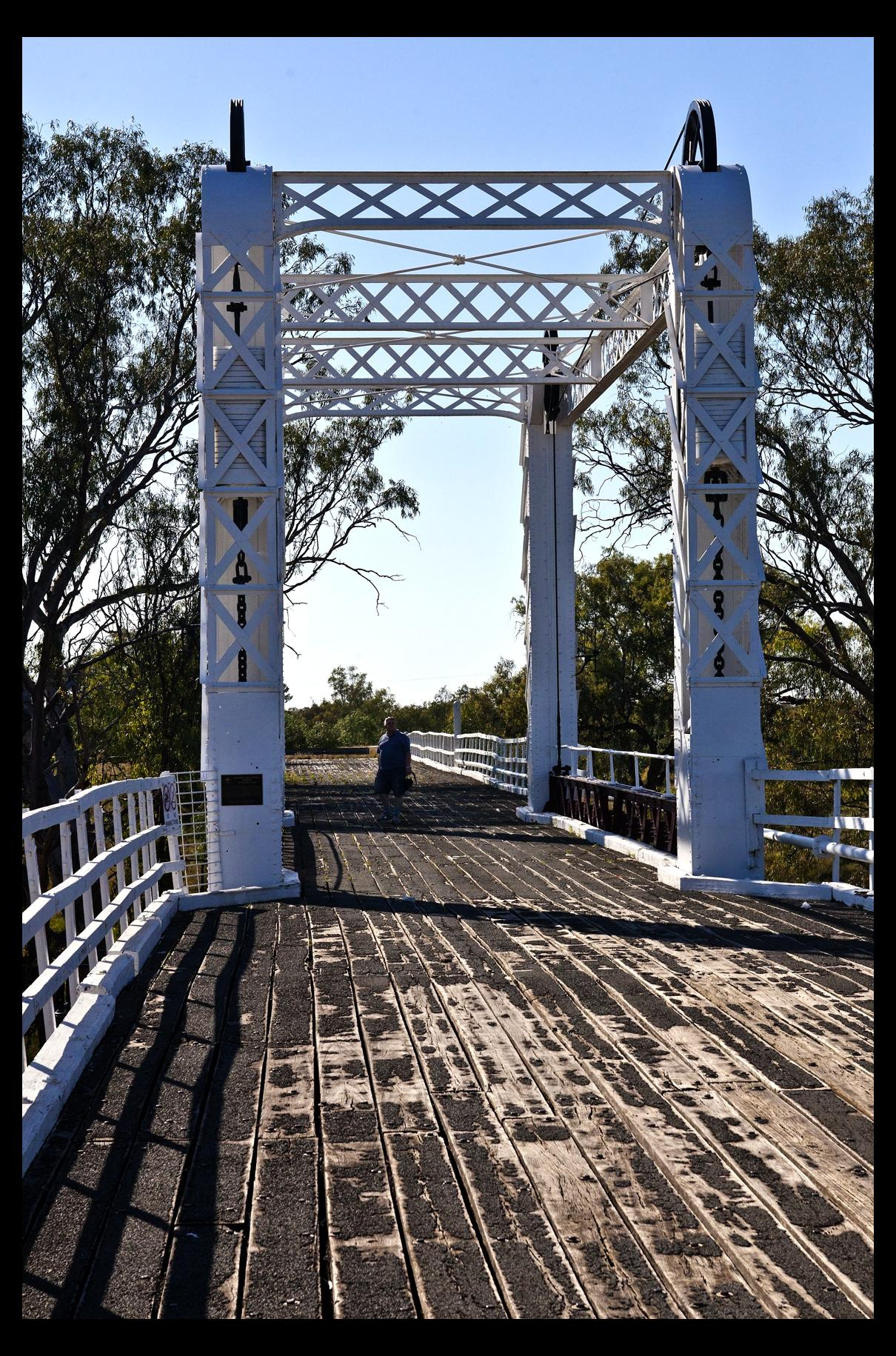
Lifting span of the old North Bourke Bridge

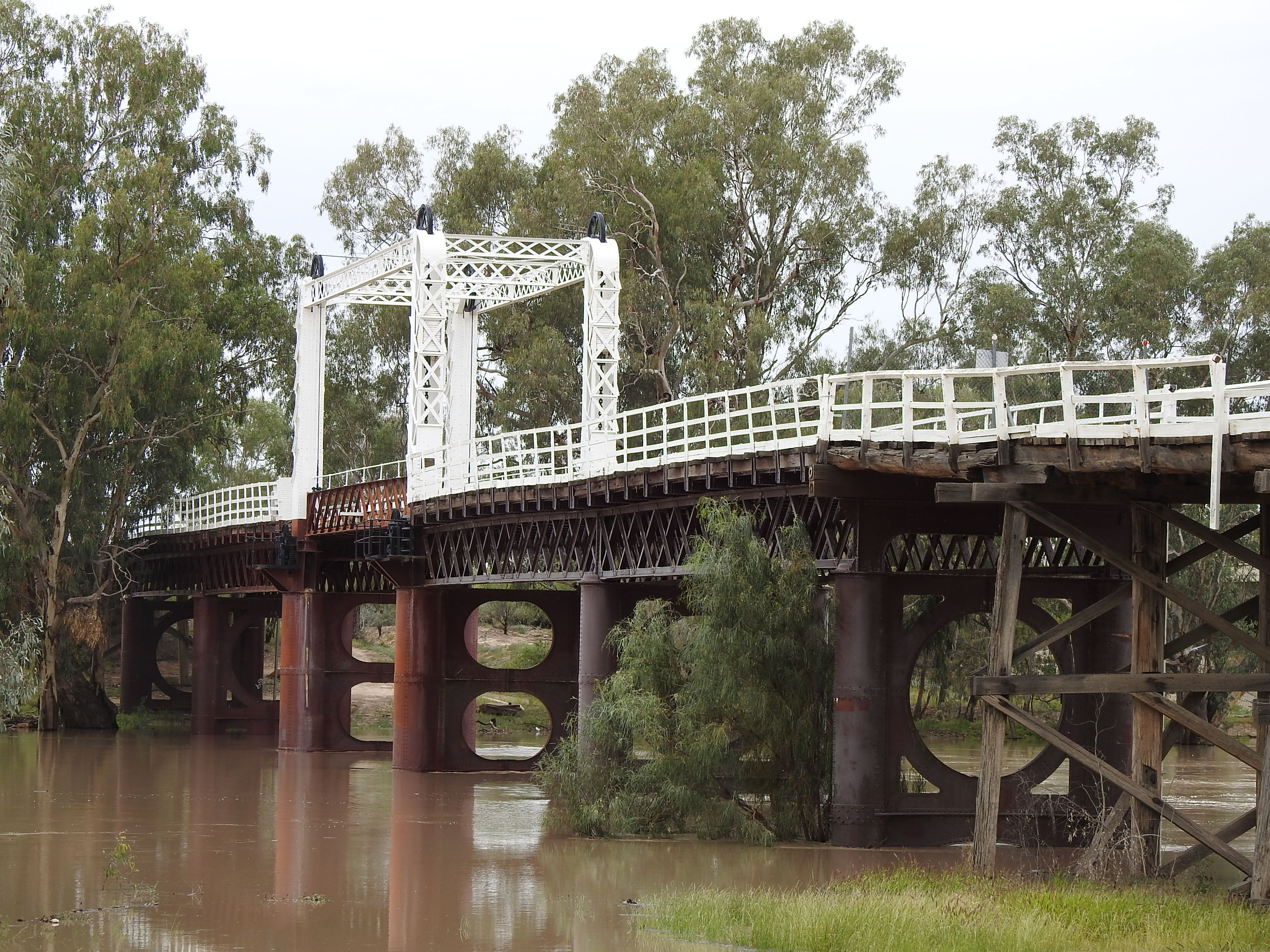
Old North Bourke bridge, in flood, northern side, North Bourke (2021)

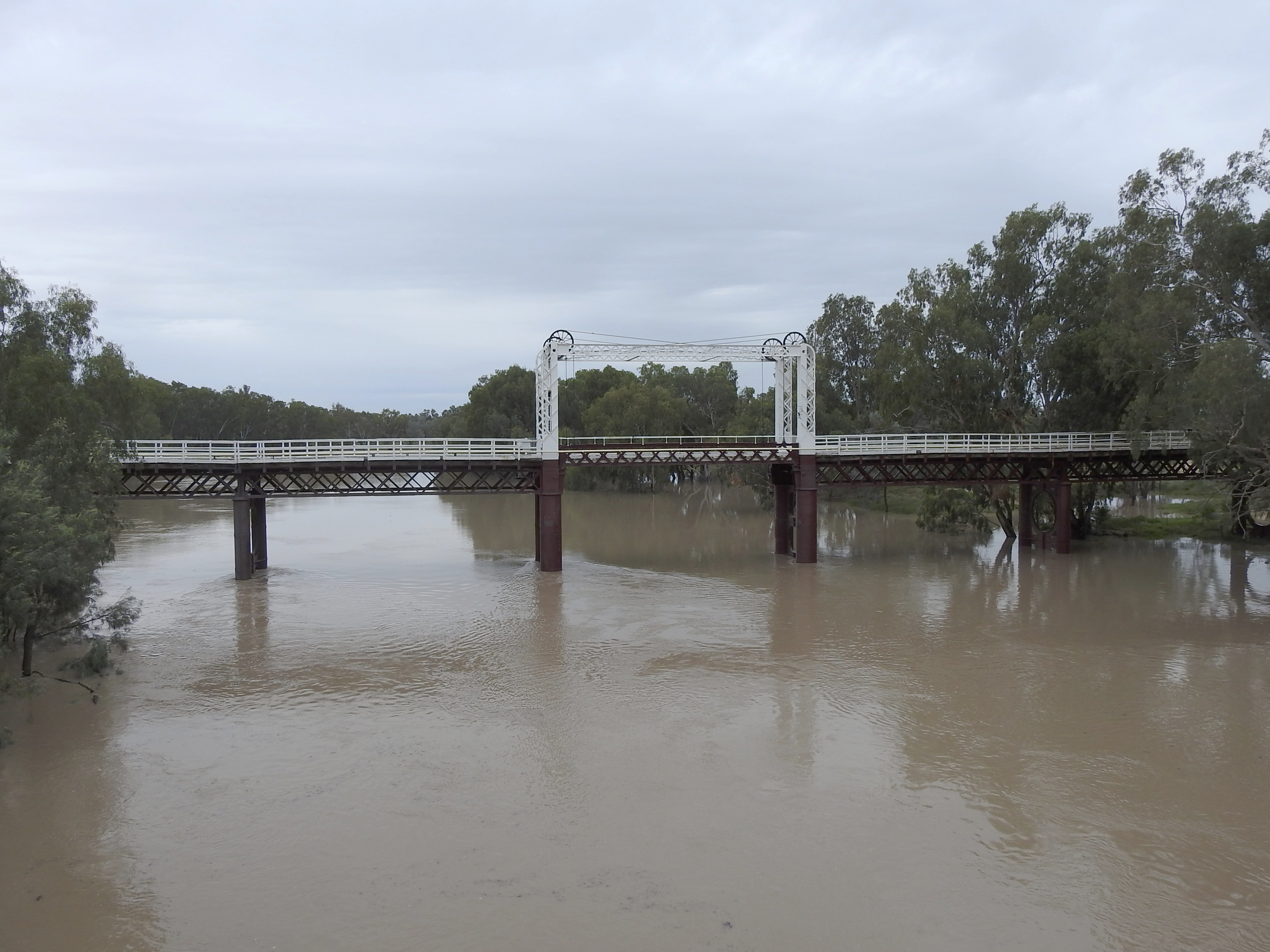
Old North Bourke bridge, in flood, southern side, North Bourke (2021)

== See also ==
- Darling River hardyhead
- Great Darling Anabranch
- List of rivers of Australia § New South Wales
- List of Darling River distances
- Water security in Australia
- Darling Sedimentary Basin
