= Wentworth County =

Wentworth
- Cadastral division
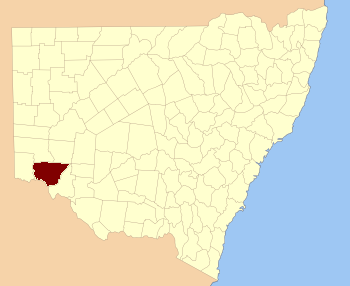
- Location in New South Wales
- Country: Australia
- State: New South Wales
Lands administrative divisions around Wentworth
Windeyer	Perry	Manara
Tara	Wentworth	Taila
Millewa (Vic)	Karkarooc (Vic)	Taila

Wentworth County is one of the 141 cadastral divisions of New South Wales. The Murray River is the boundary to the south, and the Anabranch of the Darling River is the western boundary. It includes the area where the Darling River joins the Murray River.

Wentworth County was named in honour of the explorer and statesman William Charles Wentworth.

== Parishes within this county ==
A full list of parishes found within this county; their current LGA and mapping coordinates to the approximate centre of each location is as follows:

Parish	LGA	Coordinates
Annand	Wentworth Shire	33°41′35″S 142°53′37″E
Arumpo	Wentworth Shire	33°43′39″S 142°55′25″E
Avoca	Wentworth Shire	33°55′35″S 141°51′59″E
Belar	Wentworth Shire	34°04′28″S 142°14′22″E
Bingoo	Wentworth Shire	33°45′22″S 141°54′40″E
Brewang	Wentworth Shire	34°02′46″S 142°28′46″E
Bullanmong	Wentworth Shire	33°36′37″S 142°56′29″E
Bulubula	Wentworth Shire	33°42′02″S 142°25′26″E
Bunneringee	Wentworth Shire	33°36′46″S 141°46′46″E
Buraguy	Wentworth Shire	33°48′11″S 142°52′09″E
Burrie	Wentworth Shire	33°30′51″S 142°25′55″E
Burtundy	Wentworth Shire	33°48′29″S 142°12′59″E
Cliffs	Wentworth Shire	34°09′33″S 142°21′23″E
Connargee	Wentworth Shire	33°32′56″S 142°31′52″E
Coonpa	Wentworth Shire	33°37′09″S 142°47′47″E
Copar	Wentworth Shire	33°57′38″S 142°11′43″E
Cowl	Wentworth Shire	34°11′44″S 142°35′23″E
Cudmore	Wentworth Shire	33°52′35″S 141°47′15″E
Curnoo	Wentworth Shire	33°34′36″S 142°21′04″E
Darling	Wentworth Shire	33°37′36″S 142°29′10″E
Dean	Wentworth Shire	34°17′06″S 142°26′19″E
Emu	Wentworth Shire	33°53′18″S 142°07′04″E
Gol Gol	Wentworth Shire	34°07′27″S 142°13′28″E
Gutpy	Wentworth Shire	33°31′29″S 142°08′46″E
Illingerry	Wentworth Shire	33°43′01″S 142°13′24″E
Letheroe	Wentworth Shire	33°34′43″S 142°35′48″E
Lissan	Wentworth Shire	33°35′19″S 141°54′03″E
Matong	Wentworth Shire	34°01′24″S 142°21′16″E
Merche	Wentworth Shire	33°49′35″S 142°07′38″E
Merno	Wentworth Shire	33°32′27″S 142°18′11″E
Milkengay	Wentworth Shire	33°28′08″S 141°55′09″E
Millie	Wentworth Shire	34°02′01″S 142°06′34″E
Mimi	Wentworth Shire	33°51′09″S 142°25′28″E
Mindelwul	Wentworth Shire	33°48′28″S 142°46′48″E
Moangola	Wentworth Shire	33°39′44″S 142°40′46″E
Moorpa	Wentworth Shire	33°44′28″S 141°46′38″E
Mourquong	Wentworth Shire	34°04′36″S 142°05′06″E
Murnowella	Wentworth Shire	33°47′37″S 142°36′42″E
Nanga	Wentworth Shire	33°41′08″S 142°13′14″E
Neilpo	Wentworth Shire	34°05′57″S 141°48′57″E
North Cowl	Wentworth Shire	34°08′57″S 142°34′37″E
Nundrower	Wentworth Shire	33°56′31″S 142°38′19″E
Ogro	Wentworth Shire	33°48′16″S 142°19′55″E
Oporto	Unincorporated	31°46′41″S 144°52′03″E
Palinyewah	Wentworth Shire	33°53′21″S 142°01′36″E
Para	Wentworth Shire	33°47′06″S 142°05′21″E
Paringi	Wentworth Shire	34°15′08″S 142°19′15″E
Pernolingay	Wentworth Shire	33°37′31″S 141°53′43″E
Poimba	Wentworth Shire	33°45′35″S 142°32′33″E
Pondery	Wentworth Shire	33°52′55″S 142°41′07″E
Pulpa	Wentworth Shire	33°32′30″S 142°41′50″E
Roma	Wentworth Shire	33°39′11″S 142°59′18″E
Salt Lake	Wentworth Shire	33°33′24″S 142°12′38″E
Scott	Wentworth Shire	33°44′50″S 142°19′45″E
Sturt	Wentworth Shire	33°42′00″S 142°02′58″E
Tapio	Wentworth Shire	33°57′01″S 142°00′27″E
Tarangara	Wentworth Shire	33°39′20″S 142°19′46″E
Thirrang	Wentworth Shire	34°06′01″S 142°39′23″E
Thitto	Wentworth Shire	34°12′32″S 142°26′55″E
Thoomby	Wentworth Shire	33°44′28″S 142°46′40″E
Til Til	Wentworth Shire	33°58′05″S 142°17′04″E
Tiltao	Wentworth Shire	34°01′18″S 141°58′14″E
Toontora	Wentworth Shire	33°39′17″S 142°00′33″E
Tugima	Wentworth Shire	33°50′12″S 141°54′37″E
Tulrigo	Wentworth Shire	33°30′59″S 142°02′06″E
Uki	Wentworth Shire	33°59′46″S 142°33′10″E
Ulong	Wentworth Shire	33°56′59″S 142°44′12″E
Wambera	Wentworth Shire	33°54′54″S 142°22′55″E
Wentworth	Wentworth Shire	34°05′50″S 141°56′33″E
Winnegow	Wentworth Shire	33°59′14″S 142°27′48″E
Yerta	Wentworth Shire	33°36′06″S 142°06′43″E
