= Windeyer County =

Windeyer New South Wales
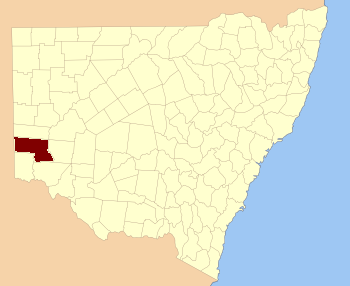
- Location in New South Wales
Lands administrative divisions around Windeyer:
South Australia	Menindee	Livingstone
South Australia	Windeyer	Perry
Hamley (SA)	Tara	Wentworth

Windeyer County is one of the 141 cadastral divisions of New South Wales. It is located between the Darling River and the border with South Australia. The Silver City Highway runs through it. Coombah Roadhouse is located there.

Windeyer County was named in honour of the barrister and politician Richard Windeyer (1806–1847).

== Parishes within this county ==
A full list of parishes found within this county; their current LGA and mapping coordinates to the approximate centre of each location is as follows:

Parish	LGA	Coordinates
Abena	Unincorporated	33°06′32″S 141°57′53″E
Antita	Unincorporated	32°49′37″S 141°31′19″E
Badham	Unincorporated	33°04′24″S 141°17′24″E
Barlow	Unincorporated	32°42′27″S 141°22′21″E
Barrawanna	Wentworth Shire	33°17′36″S 142°07′56″E
Barry	Unincorporated	32°58′30″S 141°06′12″E
Bingalong	Unincorporated	32°46′46″S 142°11′58″E
Bingerry	Wentworth Shire	33°17′40″S 141°58′54″E
Bluebush	Unincorporated	32°49′31″S 141°05′23″E
Boree	Wentworth Shire	33°06′33″S 141°28′17″E
Buckalow	Unincorporated	32°57′40″S 141°26′57″E
Coombah	Unincorporated	32°53′24″S 141°37′58″E
Cuthero	Unincorporated	33°03′21″S 142°12′23″E
Ellerslie	Unincorporated	32°48′51″S 142°04′46″E
Erreman	Wentworth Shire	33°27′09″S 142°15′32″E
Illawla	Wentworth Shire	33°21′24″S 141°58′00″E
Kertne	Wentworth Shire	33°26′23″S 142°06′02″E
Kilon	Wentworth Shire	33°20′19″S 142°20′19″E
Kudgee	Unincorporated	32°50′09″S 141°42′27″E
Mallara	Wentworth Shire	33°26′37″S 142°28′49″E
Meroo	Unincorporated	33°02′05″S 141°38′15″E
Milang	Unincorporated	32°58′14″S 141°32′05″E
Mooley	Unincorporated	32°54′23″S 142°17′28″E
Mulga	Unincorporated	32°44′36″S 141°05′40″E
Mullojama	Wentworth Shire	33°24′28″S 142°29′23″E
Leichhardt	Unincorporated	33°03′35″S 142°03′05″E
Nadbuck	Unincorporated	32°58′14″S 141°48′47″E
Nalim	Unincorporated	32°53′46″S 141°43′08″E
Ootoowa	Wentworth Shire	33°25′47″S 141°54′42″E
Orara	Wentworth Shire	33°25′38″S 142°22′07″E
Palinor	Wentworth Shire	33°17′57″S 141°50′16″E
Pearson	Unincorporated	32°39′26″S 141°04′35″E
Polia	Wentworth Shire	33°16′07″S 142°18′45″E
Popilta	Wentworth Shire	33°08′20″S 141°46′18″E
Popio	Unincorporated	33°05′36″S 141°47′34″E
Power	Unincorporated	32°57′27″S 142°03′06″E
Ramleh	Unincorporated	32°45′17″S 141°50′19″E
Spinifex	Unincorporated	32°51′13″S 141°17′53″E
Urntah	Wentworth Shire	33°12′02″S 142°05′48″E
Wallara	Unincorporated	32°46′01″S 141°57′55″E
Wanneba	Unincorporated	32°43′17″S 141°42′25″E
Wannella	Unincorporated	32°55′07″S 141°56′27″E
Whurlie	Unincorporated	32°57′18″S 142°09′54″E
Willotia	Unincorporated	32°51′41″S 142°18′26″E
Yaltolka	Unincorporated	33°00′25″S 142°17′13″E
Yarlalla	Wentworth Shire	33°09′29″S 141°56′05″E
Yartla	Wentworth Shire	33°09′38″S 142°11′21″E
