= Perry County, New South Wales =

Perry New South Wales
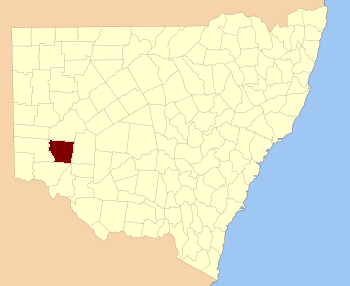
- Location in New South Wales
Lands administrative divisions around Perry:
Menindee	Livingstone	Manara
Windeyer	Perry	Manara
Wentworth	Wentworth	Kilfera

Perry County is one of the 141 cadastral divisions of New South Wales. It is located to the east of the Darling River near Pooncarie.

Perry County was named in honour of Samuel Augustus Perry (1792–1854), soldier and surveyor.

== Parishes within this county ==
A full list of parishes found within this county; their current LGA and mapping coordinates to the approximate centre of each location is as follows:

Parish	LGA	Coordinates
Astolat	Central Darling Shire	32°50′25″S 142°45′54″E
Barrara	Wentworth Shire	33°06′55″S 142°21′41″E
Barritt	Wentworth Shire	32°57′37″S 142°27′15″E
Beela	Wentworth Shire	33°19′27″S 143°14′44″E
Bell	Wentworth Shire	33°28′58″S 142°42′15″E
Bertram	Wentworth Shire	33°25′44″S 143°09′07″E
Bimpia	Wentworth Shire	32°56′49″S 142°59′21″E
Blenalben	Wentworth Shire	32°55′41″S 143°16′39″E
Burke	Wentworth Shire	33°05′17″S 142°44′22″E
Camelot	Wentworth Shire	33°00′35″S 143°05′11″E
Coonong	Wentworth Shire	33°00′12″S 143°10′53″E
Cooyarunda	Wentworth Shire	32°54′47″S 142°51′50″E
Darchy	Wentworth Shire	33°20′54″S 142°36′45″E
Enid	Wentworth Shire	33°03′42″S 142°58′23″E
Euchla	Wentworth Shire	33°20′44″S 142°43′33″E
Garnpung	Wentworth Shire	33°32′15″S 143°08′07″E
Glenstal	Wentworth Shire	33°03′52″S 142°22′56″E
Gray	Wentworth Shire	33°07′24″S 143°04′14″E
Gunpanoola	Wentworth Shire	32°53′06″S 142°44′47″E
Harley	Wentworth Shire	33°15′25″S 142°37′09″E
Howitt	Wentworth Shire	33°12′07″S 142°43′40″E
Kandra	Wentworth Shire	33°11′43″S 143°17′34″E
Karpakora	Wentworth Shire	32°53′33″S 143°06′10″E
King	Wentworth Shire	33°10′27″S 142°57′25″E
Mapenny	Wentworth Shire	33°17′27″S 142°56′26″E
Midgehope	Wentworth Shire	33°00′59″S 143°21′13″E
Mitchell	Wentworth Shire	33°27′07″S 142°55′02″E
Mooloolerie	Wentworth Shire	33°01′58″S 142°44′48″E
Moorara	Wentworth Shire	33°10′29″S 142°21′17″E
Morthong	Wentworth Shire	33°11′48″S 143°09′46″E
Mueller	Wentworth Shire	33°24′13″S 142°55′28″E
Mungo	Wentworth Shire	33°23′01″S 142°49′15″E
Mythe	Wentworth Shire	33°08′35″S 142°28′43″E
Nambucurra	Wentworth Shire	33°14′14″S 143°03′14″E
Nanda	Wentworth Shire	33°03′40″S 142°36′26″E
Nania	Wentworth Shire	33°21′13″S 143°02′12″E
Nelia	Wentworth Shire	33°11′08″S 142°32′35″E
Nuccalo	Wentworth Shire	32°49′15″S 143°12′31″E
Pan Ban	Wentworth Shire	33°16′52″S 143°08′58″E
Peppora	Wentworth Shire	32°52′12″S 142°36′46″E
Perry	Wentworth Shire	33°27′49″S 143°01′13″E
Pines	Wentworth Shire	32°56′33″S 142°36′58″E
Pombra	Wentworth Shire	33°08′34″S 142°36′00″E
Pooncaira	Wentworth Shire	33°28′06″S 142°35′39″E
Porcupine	Central Darling Shire	32°46′33″S 142°54′17″E
Prunella	Central Darling Shire	32°44′41″S 142°35′31″E
Tarcoola	Wentworth Shire	33°27′55″S 142°48′19″E
Tarmoola	Wentworth Shire	33°03′07″S 142°51′56″E
Tartna	Central Darling Shire	32°53′32″S 142°26′10″E
Timpunga	Wentworth Shire	33°17′02″S 142°29′15″E
Tolarno	Central Darling Shire	
Tuckinya	Wentworth Shire	32°46′45″S 143°04′00″E
Wanteboolka	Wentworth Shire	33°05′01″S 143°15′15″E
Welsh	Wentworth Shire	33°12′49″S 142°50′30″E
Wentworth	Wentworth Shire	33°00′28″S 142°29′32″E
Wills	Wentworth Shire	33°06′03″S 142°51′30″E
Wreford	Wentworth Shire	33°12′37″S 142°26′18″E
Yenda	Central Darling Shire	
