= Buronga, New South Wales =

Buronga
- Town
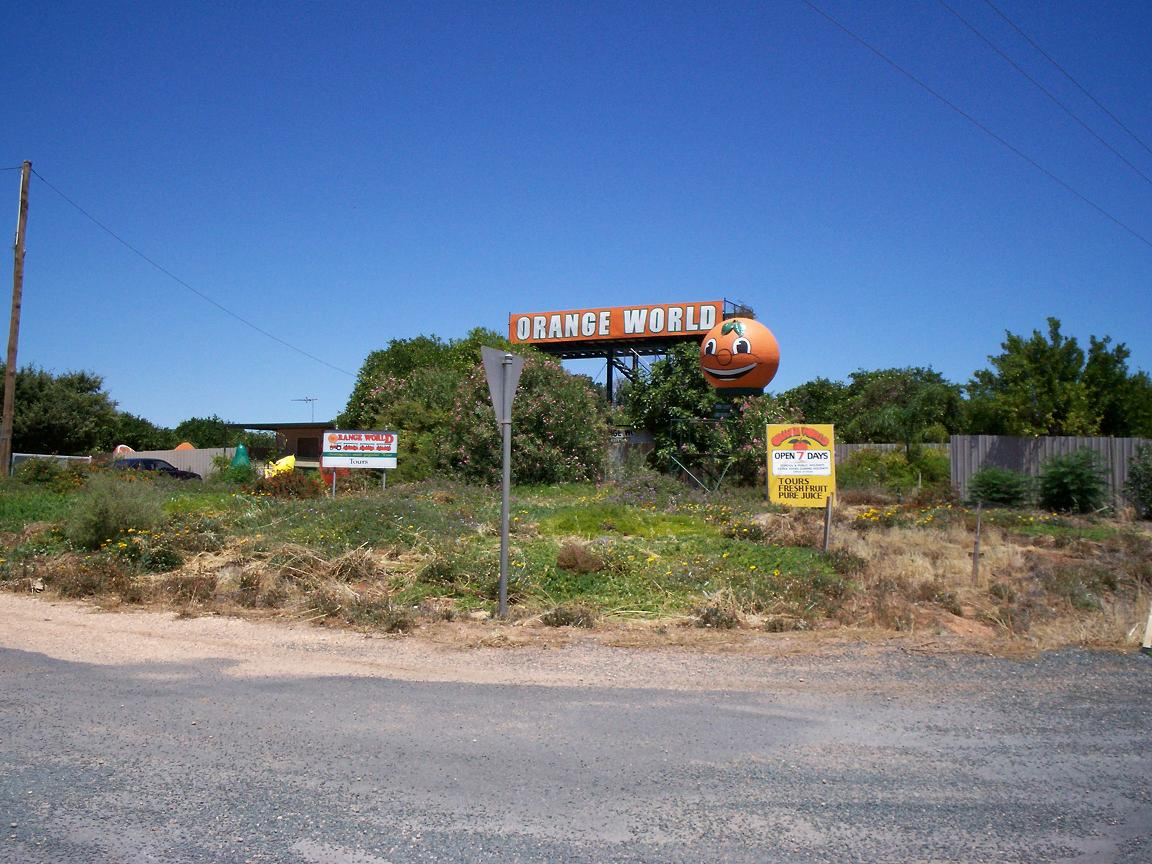
- Orange World, a 50-acre (200,000 m^{2}) tourist park in Buronga

- Interactive map of Buronga
- Coordinates: 34°09′S 142°11′E
- Country: Australia
- State: New South Wales
- Region: Sunraysia
- LGA: Wentworth Shire
- Location: 4 km (2.5 mi) NE of Mildura

Government
  - State electorate: Murray
  - Federal division: Farrer

Area
  - Total: 15.2 km^{2} (5.9 sq mi)
- Elevation: 47 m (154 ft)

Population
  - Total: 1,252 (2021 census)
  - Density: 82.37/km^{2} (213.3/sq mi)
- Postcode: 2739
- County: Wentworth
Localities around Buronga
Mourquong	Wentworth	Gol Gol
Mourquong	Buronga	Gol Gol
Mildura	Mildura	Gol Gol

Buronga (/bəˈrɒŋɡə/ bə-RONG-gə) is a town in New South Wales, Australia on the Murray River. The George Chaffey Bridge connects Buronga with Mildura, Victoria. In 2021, the town had a population of 1,252 people.

== Buronga today ==
Given their proximity, the present day town of Buronga operates largely as a satellite suburb of the regional centre of Mildura.

=== Commerce ===
The town is serviced by a small retail area consisting of such outlets as a post office, petrol stations, public bar and a bakery. It is also the industrial base of the Wentworth Shire, being the base for the local Essential Energy depot as well as several other industrial businesses, including an earthmover, concrete supplier, steel suppliers and metalworkers.

=== Community ===
Buronga is serviced by the Buronga Public School in Chapman Street. It has two churches, the St Michele Arcangelo Catholic Church, Pitman Ave, Buronga within the Roman Catholic Diocese of Wilcannia-Forbes and the Murray River Baptist Church, Midway Drive, Buronga, an Independent Fundamental Baptist Church. The town is also home to the "U Can Do It" boxing gym.

== Attractions ==
The Australian Inland Botanic Gardens are located nearby in Mourquong.

== World War II ==
On 28 September 1942, a RAAF P-40E from No. 2 Operational Training Unit based in Mildura, lost control at 6,000 feet and spun into the ground, killing pilot Sgt. J. Havard.
