= Monak =

- Town
- Coordinates: 34°19′20″S 142°23′40″E
- Country: Australia
- State: New South Wales
- LGA: Wentworth Shire
- Location: 979 km (608 mi) from Sydney; 764 km (475 mi) from Canberra; 32 km (20 mi) from Mildura; 60 km (37 mi) from Wentworth

Government
  - Federal division: Farrer

Population
  - Total: 60 (SAL 2021)
- Postcode: 2738

Monak is a locality in New South Wales, Australia, located approximately 32 km south-east of Mildura, Victoria.

== Notable people ==
Notable people from Monak include:
