= Tara County =

Tara New South Wales
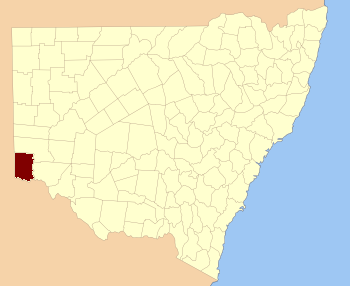
- Location in New South Wales
Lands administrative divisions around Tara:
Hamley (SA)	Windeyer	Windeyer
Hamley (SA)	Tara	Wentworth
Alfred (SA)	Millewa (Vic)	Karkarooc (Vic)

Tara County is one of the 141 cadastral divisions of New South Wales. It is located in the south-western corner of the state, to the north of the Murray River, and to the east of the border with South Australia. The Darling Anabranch River is the eastern boundary. It includes the Tarawi Nature Reserve and the localities of Huntingfield, Pine Camp, Nulla, Warranangra and Rufus River, as well as Lake Victoria.

Tara is believed to be derived from a local Aboriginal word.

== Parishes within this county ==
A full list of parishes found within this county; their current LGA and mapping coordinates to the approximate centre of each location is as follows:

Parish	LGA	Coordinates
Amoskeag South	Wentworth Shire	33°24′42″S 141°17′56″E
Belmore	Wentworth Shire	33°32′54″S 141°16′43″E
Boolonkeena	Wentworth Shire	33°56′24″S 141°34′31″E
Bowen	Wentworth Shire	33°36′07″S 141°06′59″E
Bulpunga	Wentworth Shire	33°46′15″S 141°40′33″E
Cal Lal	Wentworth Shire	33°59′41″S 141°03′08″E
Crozier	Wentworth Shire	34°01′39″S 141°33′47″E
Denison	Wentworth Shire	33°41′30″S 141°17′01″E
Dinwoodie	Wentworth Shire	33°42′36″S 141°39′39″E
Eurilla	Wentworth Shire	33°15′26″S 141°42′55″E
Fitzroy	Wentworth Shire	33°41′56″S 141°31′57″E
Foster	Wentworth Shire	33°58′06″S 141°43′07″E
Foveaux	Wentworth Shire	33°32′44″S 141°03′57″E
Franklin	Wentworth Shire	33°46′04″S 141°31′10″E
Grose	Wentworth Shire	33°21′43″S 141°07′58″E
Kennedy	Wentworth Shire	33°51′19″S 141°17′56″E
Lila	Wentworth Shire	33°49′36″S 141°11′43″E
Lindsay	Wentworth Shire	33°32′15″S 141°32′56″E
Loftus	Wentworth Shire	33°38′01″S 141°25′05″E
Lonsdale	Wentworth Shire	33°22′13″S 141°34′56″E
Mallee	Wentworth Shire	33°43′57″S 141°04′35″E
Marcoonia	Wentworth Shire	33°47′47″S 141°30′38″E
Moorna	Wentworth Shire	34°03′03″S 141°42′05″E
Musgrave	Wentworth Shire	33°46′31″S 141°23′24″E
Nialia	Wentworth Shire	33°20′01″S 141°42′37″E
Ootootwa	Wentworth Shire	33°25′56″S 141°44′58″E
Orara	Wentworth Shire	33°54′12″S 141°27′45″E
Pechilba	Wentworth Shire	33°48′56″S 141°23′39″E
Pelwalka	Wentworth Shire	33°52′09″S 141°04′46″E
Phillip	Unincorporated	33°15′33″S 141°08′24″E
Popica South	Wentworth Shire	33°16′17″S 141°25′27″E
Popica	Wentworth Shire	33°10′38″S 141°27′49″E
Robinson	Wentworth Shire	33°46′04″S 141°18′04″E
Scotia	Unincorporated	33°07′01″S 141°06′06″E
Stephen	Wentworth Shire	33°36′31″S 141°32′19″E
Taranga	Wentworth Shire	34°09′56″S 141°33′14″E
Utah	Wentworth Shire	34°03′48″S 141°33′29″E
Victoria	Wentworth Shire	33°55′49″S 141°19′03″E
Walkminga	Wentworth Shire	34°01′55″S 141°11′18″E
Waltragile	Wentworth Shire	33°37′34″S 141°39′39″E
Wangumma	Wentworth Shire	34°03′53″S 141°26′22″E
Wannawanna	Wentworth Shire	33°54′01″S 141°11′53″E
Warpa	Wentworth Shire	34°02′06″S 141°19′08″E
Warrawenia	Wentworth Shire	33°29′07″S 141°43′46″E
Wilpatera	Wentworth Shire	33°54′49″S 141°41′38″E
Wilton	Wentworth Shire	33°48′42″S 141°39′53″E
Winda South	Wentworth Shire	33°19′30″S 141°34′12″E
Winda	Wentworth Shire	33°10′54″S 141°37′14″E
Winnebaga	Unincorporated	33°13′20″S 141°16′37″E
Woolcunda	Wentworth Shire	33°28′14″S 141°24′59″E
Yantaralla	Wentworth Shire	33°58′02″S 141°27′12″E
Yarllalla South	Wentworth Shire	33°25′47″S 141°25′28″E
Yarllalla	Wentworth Shire	33°20′38″S 141°26′12″E
Young	Wentworth Shire	33°29′05″S 141°10′41″E
