= Australian Inland Botanic Gardens =

Garden in Mourquong, New South Wales

- Interactive map of Australian Inland Botanic Gardens
- Type: Botanical garden
- Location: Mourquong, New South Wales, Australia
- Nearest city: Mildura
- Coordinates: 34°8′9.6″S 142°8′20.4″E
- Area: 152 hectares (380 acres)
- Established: 1989; 37 years ago
- Vegetation: Australian Native and Non-Native
- Public transit: Bus, Car
- Website: www.aibg.org.au

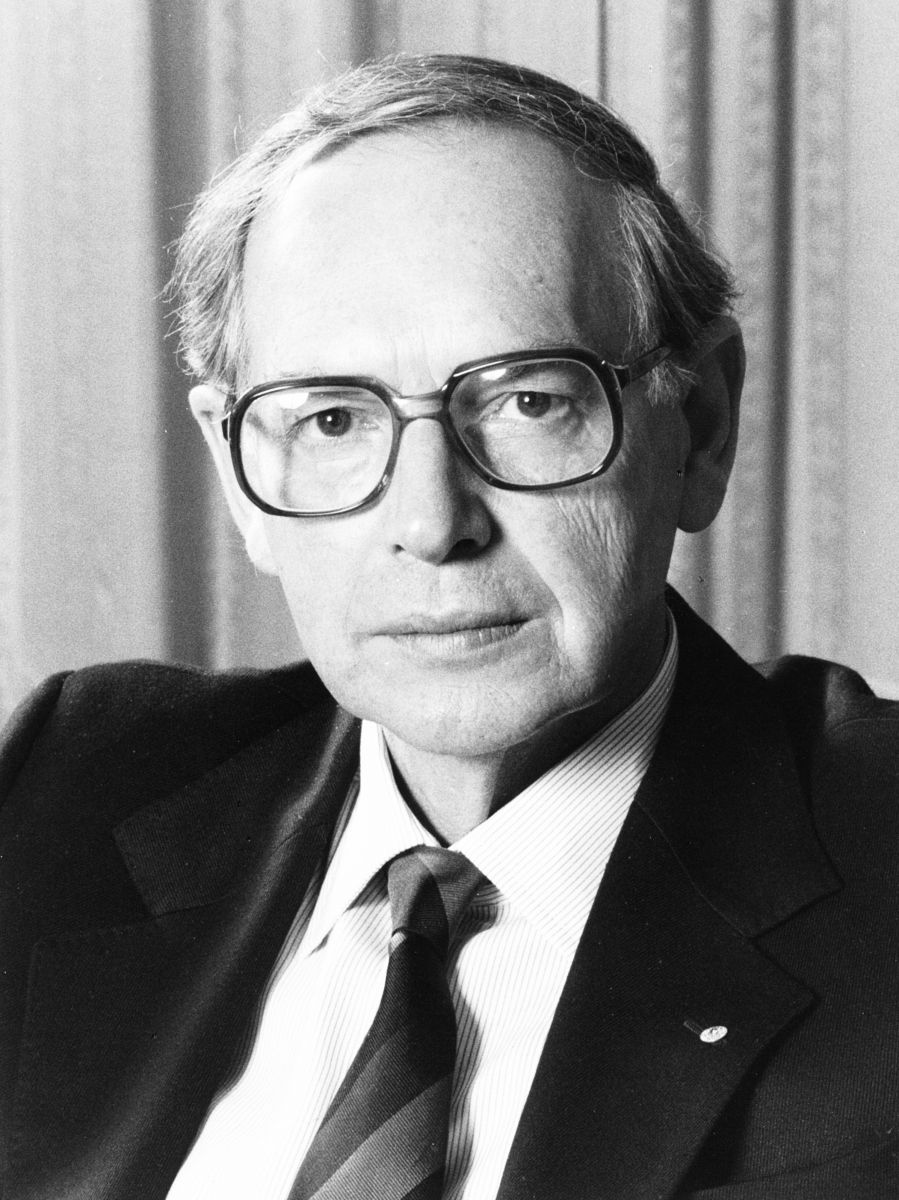
Sir Ninian Stephen, former AIBG patron.

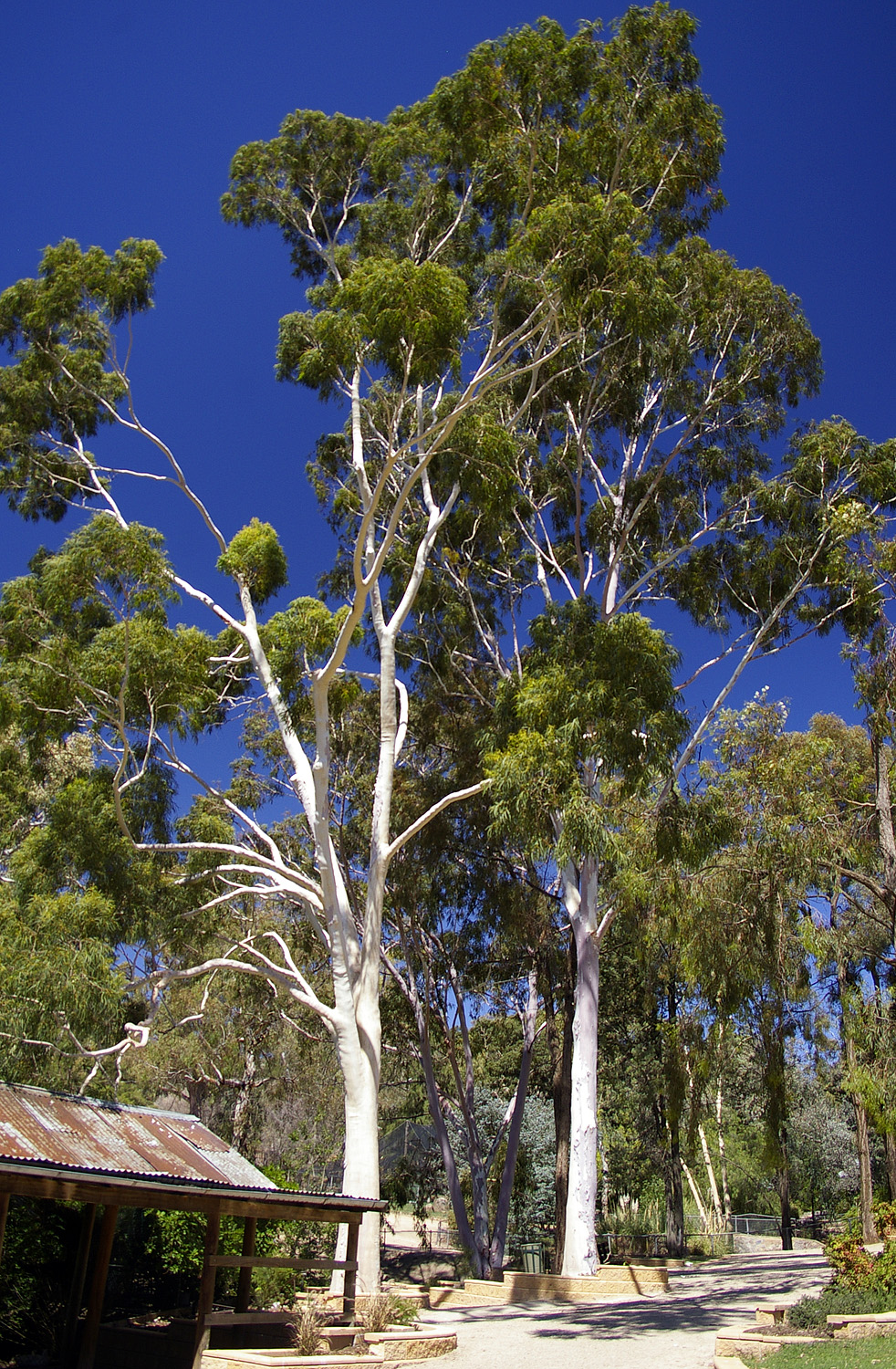
Eucalyptus citriodora (also known as Corymbia citriodora) was planted along the entrance.

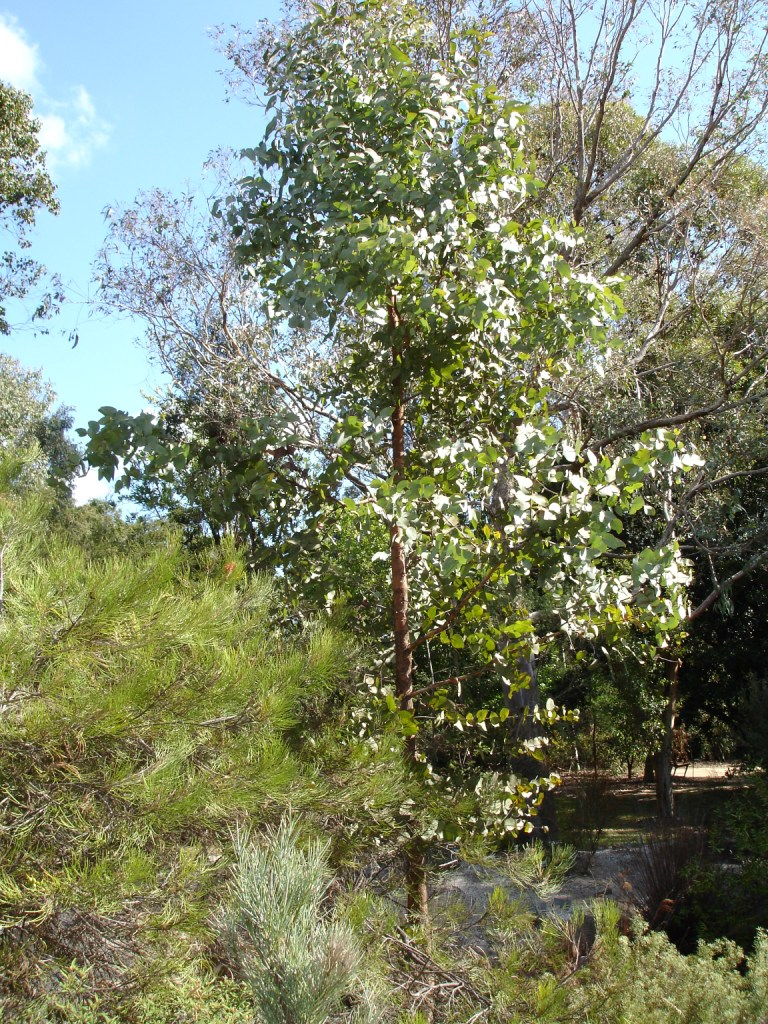
Eucalyptus dumosa, part of the mallee collection.

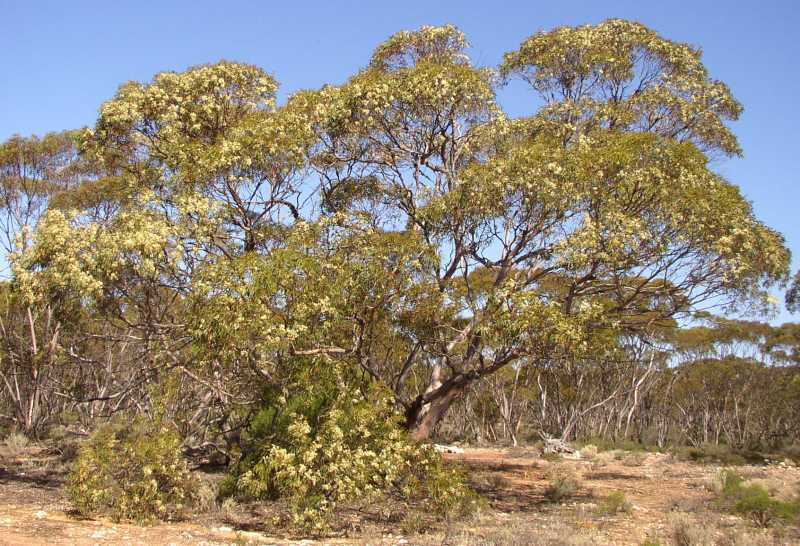
Eucalyptus oleosa, also part of the mallee collection.

The Australian Inland Botanic Gardens (AIBG; previously: Sunraysia Oasis Botanical Gardens) is a botanical garden in Mourquong, in the Wentworth Shire of south-west New South Wales. The city of Mildura and the Murray River are nearby.

AIBG is the Southern Hemisphere's first semi-arid botanical gardens. Its specialization in arid-adapted species is unique among New South Wales and Victoria botanic gardens.

== History ==
Scientists at the Commonwealth Scientific and Industrial Research Organisation (CSIRO) are credited with the idea to form the gardens and the inaugural meeting of the Garden's Steering Committee met in 1983. Five years later, the land, previously used as a sheep grazing property, was acquired as a donation to the community. The volunteer group, Friends of the Australian Inland Botanic Gardens, was also developed in 1988. In 1989, AIBG was established. John Wrigley, inaugural Director of the Australian National Botanic Gardens, drew up the master plan.

The first planting occurred in 1991. AIBG patrons, Lady Stephen and Sir Ninian Stephen, the former Governor-General of Australia, participated by planting Eucalyptus citriodora along the entrance drive. The first planting also included the garden's first floral display area of Australian salt-tolerant flora. In the same year, Garnpang, a historic, pine log sheep station homestead, was acquired by the Mildura and District Historical Society and subsequently dismantled for transport to AIBG. Much of it was rebuilt at the Gardens. It is used in a variety of ways, including as a temporary visitors' centre, classroom space and as a social centre. Garnpang's surrounding path is made of locally mined gypsum.

In 1992, full-time employees were hired. A pump was placed on the Murray River to permit an early irrigation system installation. This allowed for the salt tolerant area planting, and the formally designed Rose Garden establishment, its first rows planted by Victoria's Governor, Richard McGarvie and his wife. The following year, planting began on other sections including the American and European sections. At the same time, the Historical Society transferred Garnpang's ownership to AIBG. Maps and plans were published in the book, Garnpang, in 1993, by the Friends of Sunraysia Oasis Botanical Gardens, and the Mildura and District Historical Society.

The irrigation system was completed in 1995, and planting began on other sections, including the dry land Australian, New Zealand, Asian, and African sections. The Gardens' windmill was donated by a Gol Gol settler. The Garden's train was purchased from Mourquong's Orange World.

== Area ==
The initial development occurred on 49 hectares (120 acres) of which roughly half was apportioned to the Dryland Gardens and the other half to Irrigated Gardens. AIBG is now a 152 hectares (380 acres) botanic garden. It includes:

- River frontage reserved for future development as a natural recreation area and boat mooring (42 hectares (100 acres))
- Clifftop, reserved for future development for facilities
- Mallee sandhill fenced area (109 hectares (270 acres))
- Nature trail

== Collections ==
AIBG has over 20,000 planting and approximately 50% of the plants are labelled. It features not only Australian native plants, but also those from New Zealand, African, European, Asian, North and South American floras. The garden includes preserved, mature mallee, including Eucalyptus dumosa, Eucalyptus oleosa, Eucalyptus socialis, Eucalyptus gracilis, and Eucalyptus viridis, some of which may be as much as 2500 years old.

The rose garden has 1624 colour co-ordinated rose bushes. Salt-tolerant local flora and exotic plants separated into geographical zones are also part of the collections. There is also a rockery.

== Operations ==
An independent garden, it is operated by a committee of management. Its operations rely on donations and "in kind" services. The gardens are tended by paid staff and the Friends of AIBG. It is a member of the Council of Heads of Australian Botanic Gardens, and Botanic Gardens Conservation International. It is the lead partner of the Barkindji Biosphere Reserve.

Water, under pressure and on demand, comes from Murray River. A flag, monitored by NSW Department of Agriculture, indicates underground water level. A rabbit- and kangaroo-proof fence surrounds the gardens. Weeds are left undisturbed to protect from soil erosion. Mulch is provided through local wineries and from a saw mill. Blue-topped pegs are found in a grid pattern on the ground to identify locations.

Open daily, admission is free of charge. There is no indoor exhibition space and no plants are offered for sale. Plans are underway for an interpretation centre in conjunction with the biosphere.

== Education ==
The Bush Chapel, which acknowledges the ideas of one of the CSIRO scientists, doubles as classroom space for visiting students.

Sunraysia Institute of TAFE students perform practical work assignment at the gardens as part of their education. There are plans by La Trobe University to use the facility for research projects.

A Green Corps environmental leadership training program, hosted and accredited by Greening Australia, was established at AIBG in 2008.

On the first Sunday of each month, a tractor/train tour is available for visitors.

At least 38 different bird species have been identified at the gardens by the Bird Observers Club.

== See also ==
- Gardening in Australia
- List of botanical gardens in Australia
