= Young County =

Young County may refer to:

- Young County, Texas
- Young County, New South Wales
- County of Young, South Australia
