= Boeill Creek =

Coordinates: 34°08′36″S 142°07′12″E

- Town
- Country: Australia
- State: New South Wales
- LGA: Wentworth Shire
- Location: 1,022 km (635 mi) from Sydney; 807 km (501 mi) from Canberra; 15 km (9.3 mi) from Mildura; 288 km (179 mi) from Broken Hill

Government
  - Federal division: Farrer

Population
  - Total: 89 (SAL 2021)
- Postcode: 2739

Boeill Creek is a locality in New South Wales, Australia, located approximately 15 km north of Mildura, Victoria.
