= Barkindji Biosphere Reserve =

Biosphere reserve in Australia

- Interactive map of Barkindji Biosphere Reserve
- Location: Australia
- Nearest city: Mildura
- Coordinates: 34°10′S 142°10′E
- Area: 1,918.23 km^{2} (740.63 sq mi)
- Established: 2005
- Visitors: 133 (in 2016 (estimate))
- Website: http://www.platform09.com/bbs_site5/home.html

Barkindji Biosphere Reserve is a biosphere reserve located in the Australian states of New South Wales and Victoria on land adjacent to the Murray River and within 80 kilometres (50 mi) of the city of Mildura.

The biosphere reserve was described by UNESCO in 2016 as:

Located in Southeast Australia, the Barkindji Biosphere Reserve lies within the largest river basin of Australia — the Murray-Darling Basin. Eleven land systems spread across dunes, sand plains, wetlands, floodplains and along the Murray River characterize the topography of the reserve. Subdued mountain ranges surround Barkindji, except for the southwestern area. In addition, a rich variability in soils can be found within the reserve: red earths, grey and brown clays, and calcareous and siliceous sands represent just a few examples. Moreover, sudden changes from wetland to shrubland and semi-arid forest highlight Barkindji’s diversity of soils and habitats.

It was established in July 2005 and includes the following government-owned and privately owned land:

- Neds Corner Station which is located on the south side of the river to the west of Mildura
- Culpra forest and Kamendoc Nature Reserve (sic) on the north side of the river to the south-east of Mildura.
- Properties around and to the immediate north of Mildura including the Australian Inland Botanic Gardens.

The managing authorities for the biosphere reserve consist of the following organizations and individuals:

- Private sector organisations - Barkindji Biosphere Ltd and the Australian Inland Botanic Gardens.
- Government agencies - the Department of Infrastructure, Planning and Natural Resources (New South Wales), the Department of Sustainability and Environment (Victoria), the Trust for Nature (Victoria) and Lower Murray Water (Victoria).
- Individuals - Mr. Terry Hill and Mr. Dudley Marrows.

== See also ==
- List of biosphere reserves in Australia
