= PS Rodney =

- Location within New South Wales Location within Australia
- 33°13′00″S 142°22′07″E
- Location: Darling River, Polia Station, Pooncarie, Wentworth Shire, New South Wales, Australia

History
- Built: 1875
- Demolished: 27 August 1894

Site notes
- Architect(s): Captains Dorward and Davies
- Owner: Department of Trade & Investment, Regional Infrastructure & Services

New South Wales Heritage Register
- Official name: Rodney - paddle steamer; PS Rodney
- Type: State heritage (archaeological-maritime)
- Designated: 23 November 2007
- Reference no.: 1776
- Type: Vessel - harbour & river
- Category: Transport - Water
- Builders: Thomas McDonald

PS Rodney is a heritage-listed paddle steamer shipwreck on the Darling River at Polia Station, Pooncarie in the Wentworth Shire, New South Wales, Australia. It was designed by Captains Dorward and Davies and built by Thomas McDonald. The property is owned by Department of Trade & Investment, Regional Infrastructure & Services, an agency of the Government of New South Wales. It was added to the New South Wales State Heritage Register on 23 November 2007.

== History ==
The remains of the river paddle steamer Rodney encapsulate much of the regional history of the Darling River and the Western Plains: pastoralism, the river trade, the water-frontage stations, the tensions with the shearer's union and the uncertainties of the Darling flow.

Rodney was burnt by unionist shearers during the 1894 Australian shearers' strike in protest at it being used as a strike breaker during an industrial dispute. The 1890s shearers' strikes marked a turning point in Australian politics and the development of a politicised labour movement. Rising costs, job losses associated with new technologies, and a country that was headed towards an economic depression were combined with a growing sense of nationalism. The 1891 strike at Barcaldine, Queensland led to the election of the first labour representative in parliament the following year. It is also regarded as the birth of the Labor Party. The 1894 strike was shorter and, though by some accounts less hostile, was accompanied by the dramatic burning and destruction of Rodney on the lower reaches of the Darling River.

On 26 August 1894, Capt Dickson was in command of Rodney carrying 45 non-union labourers upstream to work in the wool sheds at Tolarno Station. Rodney was also hauling a barge carrying goods and supplies for the stations en route.

On 28 August, the steamer reached a woodpile two miles above Moorara Station. Up to 150 striking shearers commandeered the steamer and surrounds. Having moved the passengers and crew to the riverbank, bags of chaff in the fore and aft holds were torn apart, soaked in kerosene and set alight. Rodney was soon ablaze from end to end and let go down the river. Eventually the vessel burnt almost to the water line and was destroyed. The incident was described in the press as "the very worst outrage that has yet been perpetuated by shearers in these colonies". A reward was offered for the capture of those involved in the destruction of Rodney, but no one was ever convicted.

The hull of PS Rodney was reported to be "irretrievably damaged so it was broken up and the debris was drawn out of the fairway of the river".

In early 1895 the steamer Nile, itself now a wreck in the Darling River at Bourke, assisted in salvaging material from the wreck. The boiler and machinery were removed and a quantity of tools and ironwork recovered. The boiler was allegedly later taken back to Echuca and used to power machinery at the local Freezing Works. It is not known what became of the engine.

Rodney was built at Echuca in 1875 for Captains Dorward and Davies. Constructed by Thomas McDonald at his yard near "Mackintosh Mills", the 121-tonne (133-short-ton) vessel was 32 metres (106 ft) in length, 6.4 metres (21 ft) in beam, and depth of just over 2.1 metres (7 ft). Rodney was powered by a horizontal direct acting steam engine of 52 kilowatts (70 hp), built by Robinson Brothers of Melbourne.

Framed with angle iron (British Register of Ships), the hull was planked with river red gum. Fitted out with a single deck, cabin and upper saloon, the vessel was believed to be worth about A£3,000.

At the time of the loss in 1894, Rodney was owned by Permewan, Wright & Co and was said to be one of the most powerful steamers on the river. It was elsewhere described as "one of the finest of the river boats".

== Description ==
The shipwreck is located low down in the bed of the Darling River and adjacent to Polia Station about 40 kilometres (25 mi) north of the river town Pooncarie, about 107 kilometres (66 mi) south of Menindee and some 100 kilometres (62 mi) north of Wentworth. The wreckage is orientated east–west on the southern bank of the river. The Rodney was 32 metres (106 ft) in length, 6.4 metres (21 ft) in beam, and depth of just over 2.1 metres (7 ft). The frames of the vessel are angle iron; the hull planking, stingers and keel timbers are river red gum. Access to the site is via a riverbank track 7 to 8 kilometres (4.3 to 5.0 mi) east-southeast of Polia Homestead. Even during severe drought when the river level is about 1.2 metres (3 ft 11 in), (a depth described as "pooling" depth, i.e. with little or no flow), the lower hull remains of the vessel are partly submerged. The river bank is composed of light grey loam and the surrounding land is sparsely vegetated with river red gum and other Eucalypt species.

=== Condition ===
As at 22 November 2005, the wreck lies in an east–west orientation in the bed of a bend in the Darling River and up against the southern bank.

Although Rodney was substantially destroyed by fire in 1894 and has been subject to many years of periodic inundation and exposure, the lower structure of the vessel, from stem to stern, has survived relatively intact. As an archaeological site there are sufficient remains to develop a model of the hull structure of what was one of the largest paddle steamers to operate on the river.

The exposed ends of the iron framing are heavily corroded with the extremities of these frames being extremely fragile. The red gum planking however is generally very well preserved, particularly in the permanently inundated lower hull area which is still beneath "pooling" level in extreme drought conditions

The remains of the hull of Rodney, recognising the loss attributed to fire and salvage copntemproary to the loss of the vessel, retain a high degree of integrity of its fabric. The site retains a high degree of integrity due to the presence of original fabric and the esteem with which it is held as a part of the history of the Darling River and the Shearer's Strike.

== Heritage listing ==
As at 19 November 2009, the Rodney Historic Shipwreck site was significant as a physical marker to a violent episode in the Shearer's Strikes of the 1890s and as a symbol of the politicisation of the Australian labour movement. Burnt to the water line in an 1894 protest by unionist shearers, the archaeological remains provide a tangible link to this colourful era of riverboat activity on the Darling River. Community interest in the historic shipwreck is demonstrated by the significant centenary celebrations. A vessel renowned locally for its size, the Rodney was an established steamer that provided a critical service to pastoralists and the river towns that it frequented.

The PS Rodney was listed on the New South Wales State Heritage Register on 23 November 2007 having satisfied the following criteria.

The place is important in demonstrating the course, or pattern, of cultural or natural history in New South Wales.

The PS Rodney is associated with a significant activity and historical phase. The seizure and burning to "Rodney" was directly related to the endeavours of unionists to counter the attempts by the owners of the sheep stations along the Darling River to circumvent the effectiveness of the Shearer's Strike. At that time of the seizure and burning of the Rodney, the work of the riverboat steamers was a vital transport component of the wool industry. Control of river transport was a key issue during the 1890s Shearer's Strike, itself a highly significant event in the history of Australian industrial relations.

The existence of recognizable remains of the paddle steamer involved in the Shearer's dispute provides a strong sense of continuity with the process of industrial relations associated with a key economic activity of the Darling River - an economic activity that has spanned the time since the 1890s dispute to the present day.

The place has a strong or special association with a person, or group of persons, of importance of cultural or natural history of New South Wales's history.

The PS Rodney is directly associated with the industrial dispute between graziers and shearers in the last decade of the 19th century and, in particular. The use of the Rodney to carry non-union labour demonstrates the determination of the graziers to break the strike utilising the only significant transport available at that time. Equally, the destruction of the Rodney by the unionists, the only recorded act of industrial espionage of this nature, demonstrates the ferocity with which the dispute was being fought.

The place is important in demonstrating aesthetic characteristics and/or a high degree of creative or technical achievement in New South Wales.

The PS Rodney shows and is associated with, creative or technical innovation or achievement and exemplifies a particular taste, style or technology. The Rodney demonstrates the essential technological character of broad, shallow draft river boats that served the inland river trade in the late 19th century. It is one of the few surviving original hull assemblages that show composite construction of iron frames and River Redgum planks, keel and stem/stern post.

The timbers, fastenings and iron frames that survive substantively intact to the turn of the bilge document inland shipbuilding traditions of the latter nineteenth century.

The place has a strong or special association with a particular community or cultural group in New South Wales for social, cultural or spiritual reasons.

The PS Rodney is important for its associations with an identifiable group and is important to a community's sense of place. The site epitomises the empathy of local Darling River port towns with their historical links to the river and the earlier paddle steamer era.

The 1994 commemoration and re-enactment event that drew over 700 people to this remote location on the Darling River demonstrated the importance of the Rodney particularly to the communities along the Darling River. The interest in the history of the Rodney continues to be shared by unionists and station owners, as demonstrated by the cross section of people you attended and supported the event.

The place has potential to yield information that will contribute to an understanding of the cultural or natural history of New South Wales.

The PS Rodney is an important benchmark or reference site or type. The Rodney is an important reference type to the character and construction of late 19th century riverboats in New South Wales. It fills a gap in the archival records, few of which document construction details. Its original fabric retains a high degree of integrity unlike a number of other shipwrecks along the Murray and Darling which have been recovered and disassembled and the original fabric largely replaced in order to construct working vessels that are effectively only indicative of the original boat.

The place possesses uncommon, rare or endangered aspects of the cultural or natural history of New South Wales.

The ps Rodney provides evidence of a defunct custom, way of life or process and shows rare evidence of a significant human activity important to a community. The Rodney provides evidence of a defunct transportation system that operated along the Darling River.

The integrity of the original fabric in the hull is unusually accurate evidence of the riverboat boatbuilding skills used in the late 19th century. The remains of the Rodney are the only known, undisturbed, archaeological remains of a composite built river boat that was built for and operated on the Darling River.

The Rodney is the only recorded riverboat, coastal or ocean-going vessel to have been destroyed in the context of any industrial dispute in Australia. As such it is of high significance to the history of industrial relations in this country.

The place is important in demonstrating the principal characteristics of a class of cultural or natural places/environments in New South Wales.

The PS Rodney has the principal characteristics of an important class or group of items, is part of a group which collectively illustrates a representative type and is outstanding because of its integrity or the esteem in which it is held. The remains of the Rodney retain the principle characteristics of the inland riverboats in terms of their broad beams, shallow draft and use of indigenous timbers, particularly the River Redgum.
