= Neds Corner Station =

Coordinates: 34°08′27″S 141°19′39″E

Neds Corner Station is a 30,000 ha nature reserve owned by the Trust for Nature. It is a former sheep grazing property on a pastoral lease abutting the Murray River and the Murray-Sunset National Park in the Mallee region of north-western Victoria, south-eastern Australia.

== Description ==
The reserve lies at the confluence of the arid and semi-arid zones. It contains strips of river red gum forest and black box floodplain woodlands along the Murray and its associated wetlands. Much of the rest of the property consists of flat alluvial plains with mallee woodlands, chenopod shrublands, semi-arid grasslands and ephemeral lignum wetlands.

== History and environmental decline ==
For thousands of years prior to European settlement, the Ngintait people, the traditional owners, inhabited and cared for the land surrounding Neds Corner. Following European colonisation and the displacement of Aboriginal communities, the site became a pastoral station and was farmed for over a century. Agricultural operations involved widespread land clearing, crop production, irrigation, and heavy stocking with sheep and cattle.

The station was established in 1849 by Edward Meade ("Ned") Bagot, son of Charles Hervey Bagot, a wealthy South Australian pastoralist and parliamentarian. Bagot first visited the area in late 1847 when he retrieved the body of his friend Fred Handcock, a fellow pastoralist, who had drowned nearby. Bagot started by grazing cattle but soon switched to sheep, using riverboats on the Murray to transport the wool. The property was named after Ned, a shepherd on the property. In 1876, the pastoral lease was sold to Robert Barr Smith. In 1920, the lease was taken over by the Neds Corner Pastoral Company. In 1946, the lease was sold to the Kidman Pastoral Company, owned by Sir Sidney Kidman.

By the end of the 20th century, intensive pastoral use of the land had caused serious environmental damage. The area suffered from compacted earth, exposed sand dunes, rampant rabbit populations, heightened soil salinity, and reduced water quality resulting from Murray River water diversions.

In 2002, the property was purchased by the Trust for Nature, to be managed for conservation.

== Cultural heritage and significance ==
Neds Corner Station encompasses a rich cultural landscape featuring numerous protected First Nations heritage sites. Documented Indigenous cultural features across the property include:

- Burial grounds: graves of First Nations ancestors
- Modified trees: specimens bearing trunk scars from bark harvested for watercraft, defence equipment, and everyday domestic items
- Domestic and occupation sites: earth mounds from ancient cooking hearths, fireplaces, and heaps of discarded river shells
- Worked stone: artifacts crafted for cutting, processing, and hunting

Traditional owners maintain a continuous connection to their ancestral lands and integrate Indigenous ecological knowledge into reserve management alongside Trust for Nature and the First People of the Millewa-Mallee Aboriginal Corporation.

== Habitat restoration and conservation ==
Trust for Nature purchased Neds Corner Station in 2002 to rehabilitate its depleted ecosystems. Working alongside traditional owners, community volunteers, philanthropic supporters, and research partners, key restoration initiatives have included:

- Grazing cessation: All domestic cattle and sheep were removed to allow topsoil stabilization and native plant regeneration.
- Flora re-establishment: Native bluebush and saltbush vegetation was reintroduced across eroded sand dunes and hardpan clay soils.
- Invasive species mitigation: Structured eradication programs were launched to control invasive pests, primarily feral foxes and rabbits.

These actions successfully turned a degraded agricultural enterprise into a thriving ecological refuge. In 2022, Trust for Nature formally announced plans to return legal title of Neds Corner Station to the traditional owners.

== Wildlife and botanical diversity ==
The reserve provides a sanctuary for nearly 1,000 species of native plants and animals in north-western Victoria.

=== Native fauna ===
Regional environmental change eliminated at least 18 native small mammal species from the surrounding country; today, Neds Corner Station serves as a sanctuary for the remaining five. Recorded native wildlife includes:

- Avifauna: more than 120 bird species
- Reptiles: 24 distinct species
- Amphibians: a key habitat for the nationally vulnerable growling grass frog

Native fauna recovery is bolstered by ongoing eradication efforts directed at foxes, feral cats, and rabbits.

== Flora and scientific discoveries ==
Field botanical inventories across the station have recorded 77 flora species at risk of extinction. Additionally, scientific expeditions on site have identified 21 plant taxa previously unrecorded anywhere, among them an undescribed fungal organism and a daisy native to Victoria, dubbed the large hard-head daisy.

== See also ==
- Barkindji Biosphere Reserve
