= Titabaira, New South Wales =

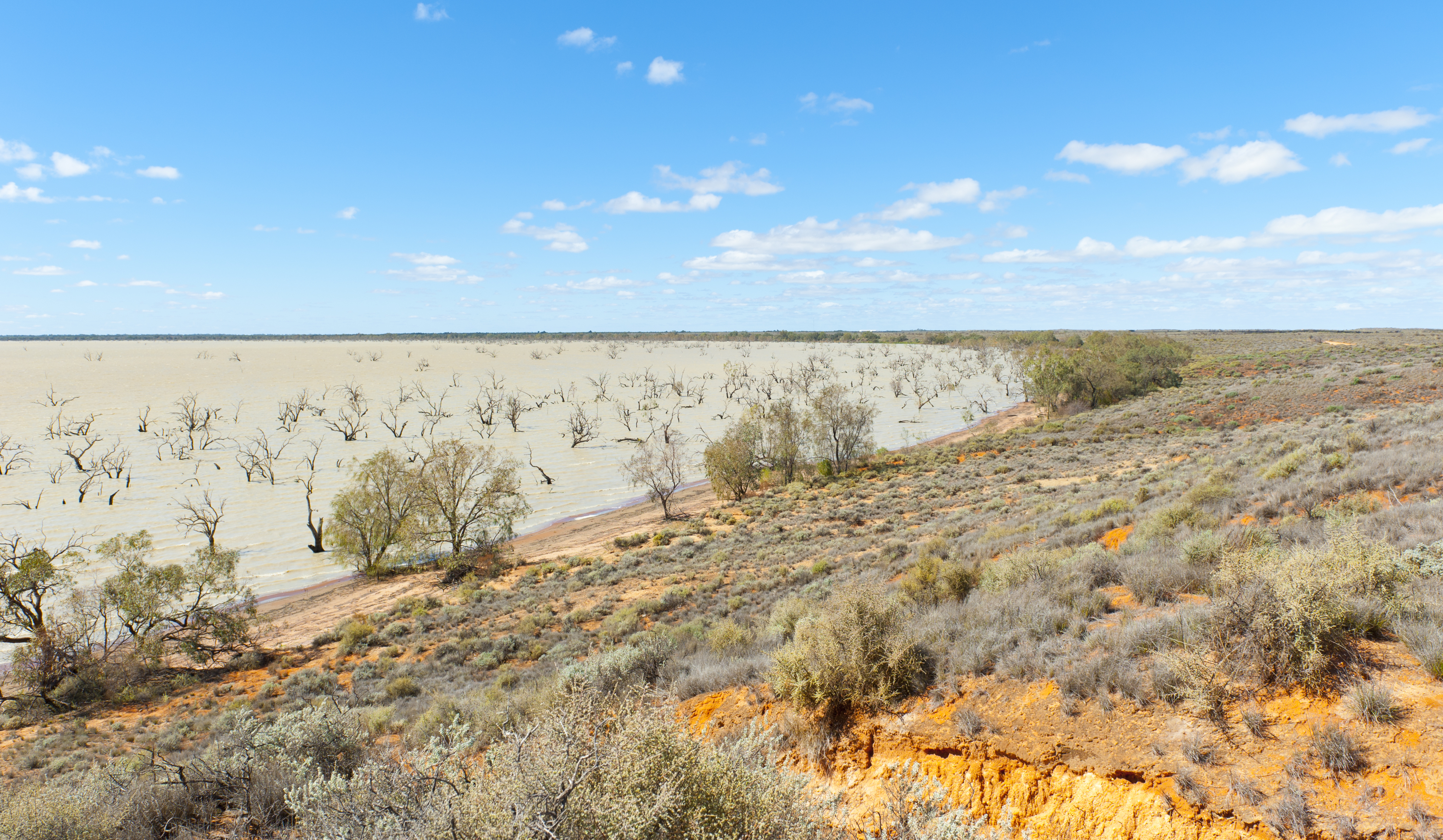
Lake Pamamaroo, in the parish

Titabaira, New South Wales is a remote rural locality of Central Darling Shire and civil parish of Tandora County located at 32°15′01″S 142°28′48″E on the Menindee Lakes. It is located to the northwest of the Darling River, to the area to the north of Menindee.
