= Sunraysia Institute of TAFE =

Coordinates: 34°12′12.29″S 142°10′3.95″E

- Other names: SuniTAFE
- Former names: Sunraysia College of TAFE
- Type: Technical and further education
- Established: 1980
- Location: Mildura, Victoria, Australia
- Website: https://www.sunitafe.edu.au

The Sunraysia Institute of TAFE, also known as SuniTAFE, is a vocational education and training services provider in north-west Victoria, Australia. Founded in 1980, it has campuses in Mildura and Swan Hill, and a training farm in Cardross.

== History ==
The institute was established in 1980 as the Sunraysia College of TAFE. Sunraysia College of TAFE was the first purpose designed TAFE college in Victoria. It was renamed to the Sunraysia Institute of TAFE on 2 October 1995.

From its inception the Institute aimed to provide training to meet the needs of the local community, including more remote locations in the region such as Ouyen, Manangatang and Werrimull. The institute was also established with a tri-state focus due to its unique location near the border of the three states of Victoria, New South Wales and South Australia.

== Campuses ==
The institute has two main campuses located at Mildura and Swan Hill, .

There were formerly campuses at Robinvale and Horsham, which appear to have closed down by January 2022.

The service the Institute provides extends over a large geographic area, generally bounded by Pooncarie in NSW (150 km to the North); Balranald in NSW (200 km to the east); the Riverland region in SA (150 km to the west); Murrayville in Victoria (230 km to the south west on the SA border); and in a region 375 km south and south east of Mildura including the communities of Ouyen, Robinvale, Sea Lake, Swan Hill, Ultima and Kerang.

== Courses ==
Study areas offered by the Institute in its first years of operation included Automotive Studies, Business Studies, Engineering, and Rural Studies. Today the institute offers training in areas of Automotive, Transport & OHS, Health and Wellbeing, Business & Environment, Education and Media, Hospitality & Personal Services, Industry & Energy & Environment and Language, Literacy & Work Skills.

Some modules include providing services at the nearby Australian Inland Botanic Gardens.
