= Dareton, New South Wales =

Dareton
- Town
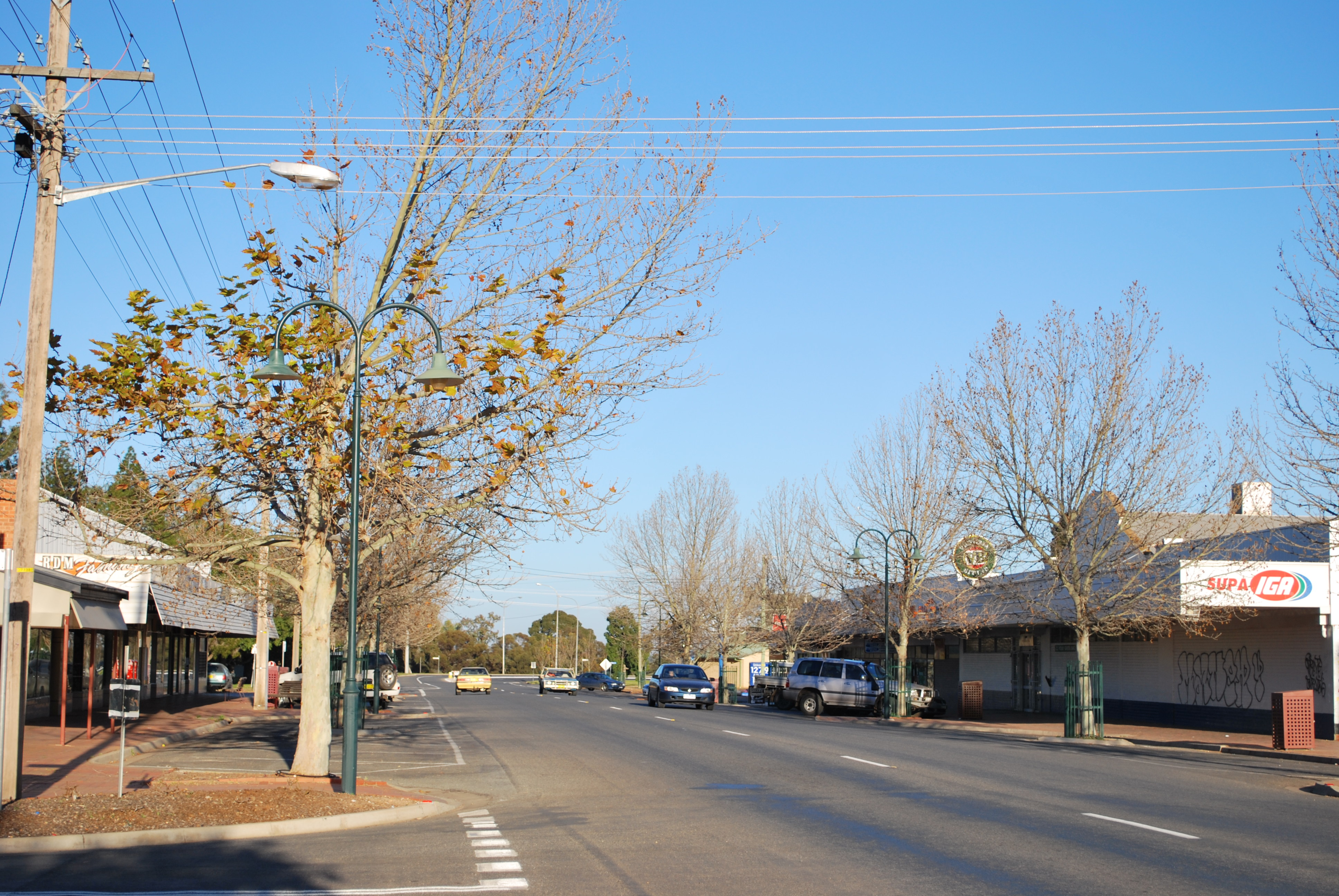
- Tapio Ave, the main street of Dareton

- Coordinates: 34°05′0″S 142°01′0″E
- Country: Australia
- State: New South Wales
- LGA: Wentworth Shire
- Location: 1,021 km (634 mi) from Sydney; 402 km (250 mi) from Adelaide; 562 km (349 mi) from Melbourne; 13 km (8.1 mi) from Wentworth; 20 km (12 mi) from Mildura (Vic.)
- Established: 1922

Government
  - State electorate: Murray
  - Federal division: Farrer

Population
  - Total: 501 (2016 census)
- Postcode: 2717

Dareton is a town in the far west of New South Wales, Australia. The town is located on the Silver City Highway, 1,025 kilometres west of the state capital, Sydney and 20 kilometres from the regional centre, Mildura, across the border in Victoria. Part of the Wentworth Shire local government area, at the 2011 census, Dareton had a population of 516.

Located on the Murray River, the town is at the heart of the Coomealla Irrigation Area. Dareton was once home to an Aboriginal mission, which is now a residential area for Aboriginal people. Australian Test cricket captain Mark Taylor spent part of his early life in Dareton.

== History ==
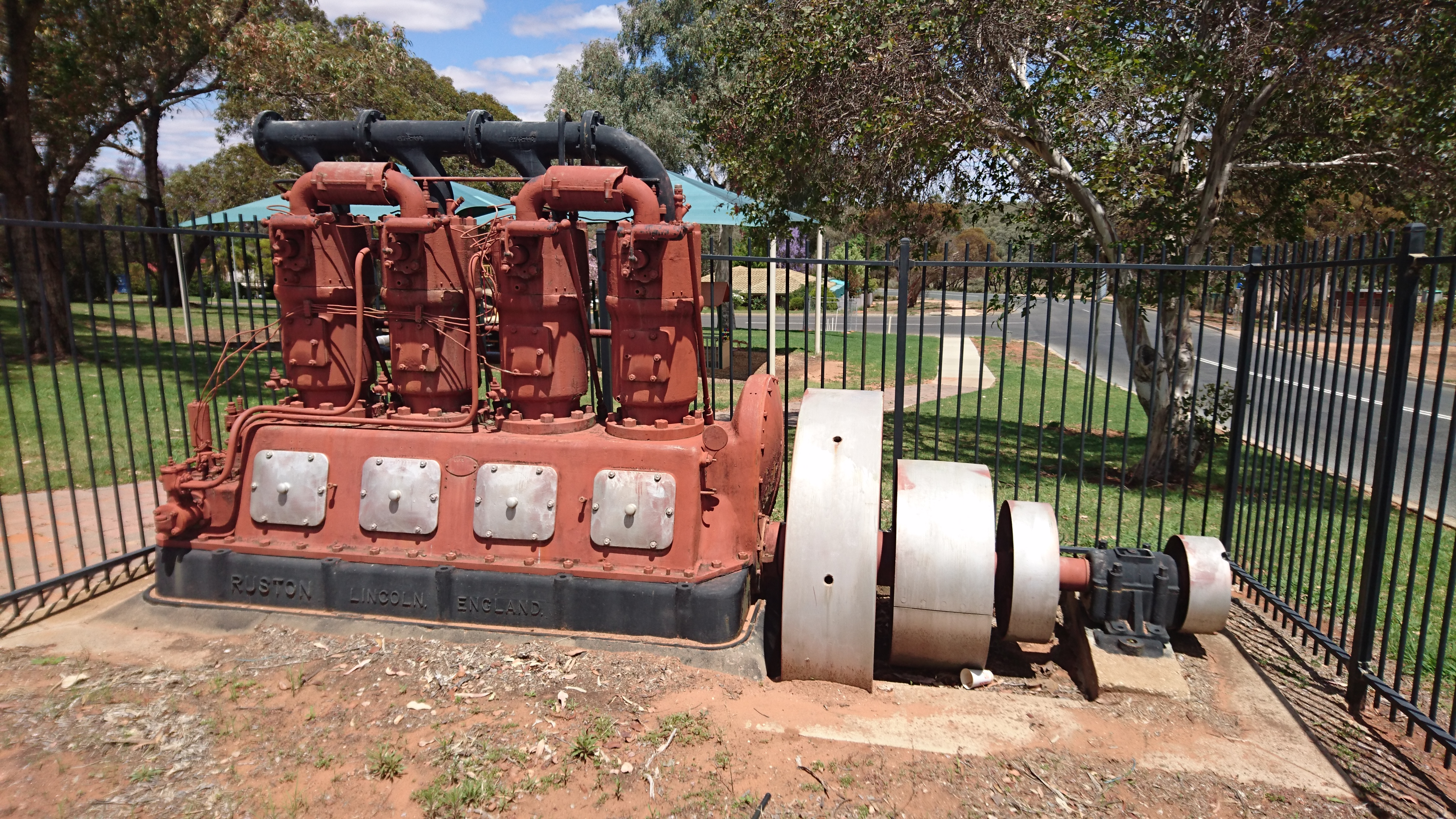
Rushton 4cyl oil-diesel engine. This ran as an engine driving an irrigation pump to draw water from the Murray River for the Coomealla Irrigation Area. It is now an exhibit in a park in the town.

Dareton had its genesis in 1922 with the recommendation to establish irrigation in the area. Pioneering settlers moved to the district soon after, but it was not until after World War II and the establishment of soldier settler farms that Dareton began to prosper. Dareton is named for the then Water Conservation and Irrigation Commissioner Henry Dare, who was a strong advocate for the irrigation scheme.

In April 1979 the Shire decided to close a camp site for about 10 Indigenous people which had been there for over 15 years. The Shire said they had remove the people as they could potentially contaminate the water supply. It was reported that the Shire wanted the site to establish a caravan park. The trucks collected everything at the site and dump it east of town on Namatjira avenue a reserve for Indigenous families. This reserve had 12 houses occupied by approximately 100 people when the trucks arrived there was no available accommodation. There were funds available to build three more houses at the time 49 people were awaiting housing of which 26 had been identified as emergency cases.

George Kolsky a local trustee of the National Aboriginal Conference who own the Namatjira site said that it was the most cruel and disgusting thing he had even seen. and that its like the dog catchers chasing stray dog. The council was asked what provision had been made to rehouse the people, their response was that they dont have any, and that this was humane option.

== Today ==
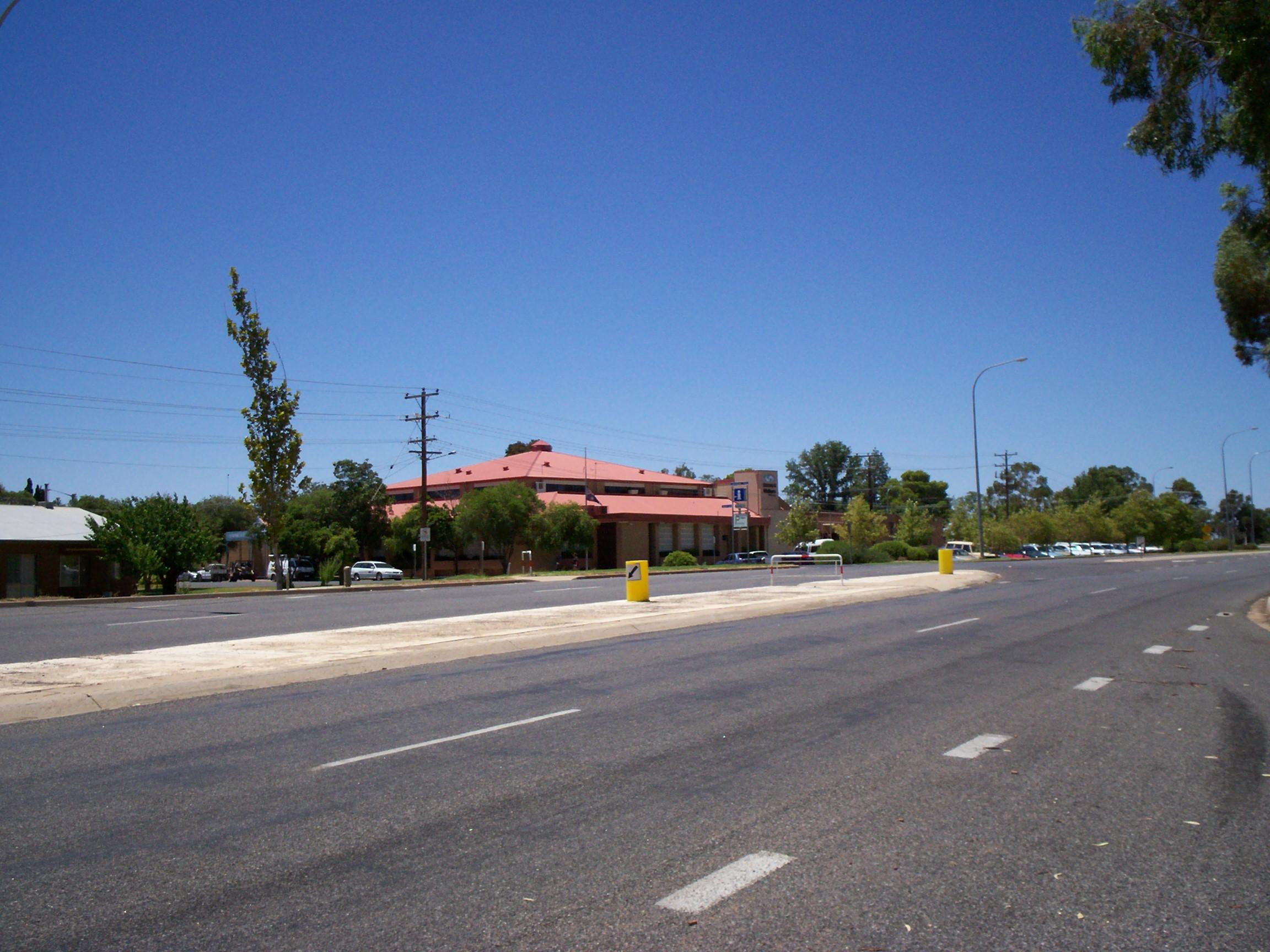
The Coomealla Memorial Sporting Club, on the Silver City Highway in Dareton

Dareton today is a producer of grapes and dried fruit. It boasts a championship golf course and is a popular location for fishing and camping.

A major local entity is the Coomealla Memorial Sporting Club. It operates a large gambling and social facility, plus various sporting facilities (including a golf course). The club was immensely popular with South Australians and Victorians looking for a pokies venue when they were unavailable in those states.

Schools include Dareton Public School, Coomealla High School and the Coomealla Campus of the Riverina Institute.
