= Dry Lake, New South Wales =

Dry Lake is an ephemeral body of water in Young County, New South Wales, Australia, north of Wilcannia, New South Wales.

Dry Lake has a Köppen climate classification of BWh (Hot desert).

Dry Lake should not be confused with The Dry Lake, an ephemeral water body between towns of Bourke, New South Wales and Brewarrina and the village of Goodooga, The Dry Lake, when full, covers an area of around 520 hectares. Nor should it be confused with the smaller body called Dry Lake south of Hay, New South Wales.
