= Menindee County =

Menindee New South Wales
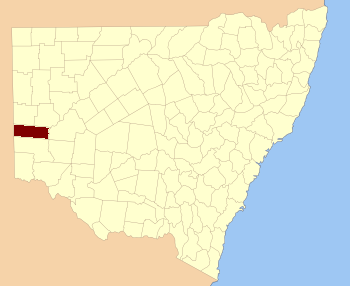
- Location in New South Wales
Lands administrative divisions around Menindee:
South Australia	Yancowinna	Tandora
South Australia	Menindee	Livingstone
South Australia	Windeyer	Perry

Menindee County is one of the 141 cadastral divisions of New South Wales. It is located between the Darling River and the South Australian border. Menindee is at its north-eastern edge. The Menindee Lakes are located there.

The name Menindee is of unknown origin.

== Parishes within this county ==
A full list of parishes found within this county; their current LGA and mapping coordinates to the approximate centre of each location is as follows:

Parish	LGA	Coordinates
Bintullia	Unincorporated	32°40′32″S 142°11′08″E
Buckalow East	Unincorporated	32°38′22″S 141°15′12″E
Buckalow West	Unincorporated	32°33′51″S 141°05′00″E
Buckalow	Unincorporated	32°33′35″S 141°13′43″E
Burta	Unincorporated	32°30′00″S 141°04′59″E
Caari	Unincorporated	32°29′07″S 141°48′34″E
Cawndilla	Central Darling Shire	32°27′28″S 142°11′24″E
Coonalhugga	Central Darling Shire	32°41′36″S 142°19′44″E
Coultra	Unincorporated	32°15′35″S 141°04′04″E
Doon	Unincorporated	32°20′27″S 141°12′56″E
Enmore	Unincorporated	unknown
Ita	Unincorporated	32°39′33″S 141°26′12″E
Kinchega	Central Darling Shire	32°31′07″S 142°19′39″E
Laidley	Central Darling Shire	32°25′10″S 142°18′07″E
Mitta	Unincorporated	32°41′56″S 142°00′07″E
Mundybah	Unincorporated	32°19′53″S 141°55′44″E
Naloira	Central Darling Shire	32°34′22″S 142°20′32″E
Nettlegoe	Unincorporated	32°33′10″S 142°00′55″E
Paringi	Unincorporated	32°22′03″S 142°08′06″E
Perry	Central Darling Shire	32°20′55″S 142°21′31″E
Pinnelco	Central Darling Shire	32°37′41″S 142°18′37″E
Putta	Unincorporated	32°25′28″S 141°12′03″E
Rantyga	Unincorporated	32°18′09″S 141°36′13″E
Tandou	Central Darling Shire	32°32′32″S 142°12′05″E
Waneba	Unincorporated	32°37′08″S 141°37′28″E
Wanga	Unincorporated	32°26′05″S 141°18′54″E
Wendi	Unincorporated	32°30′19″S 141°35′55″E
West Mitta	Unincorporated	32°40′44″S 141°48′33″E
West Wendi	Unincorporated	32°25′59″S 141°27′09″E
