= Hume Parish, New South Wales =

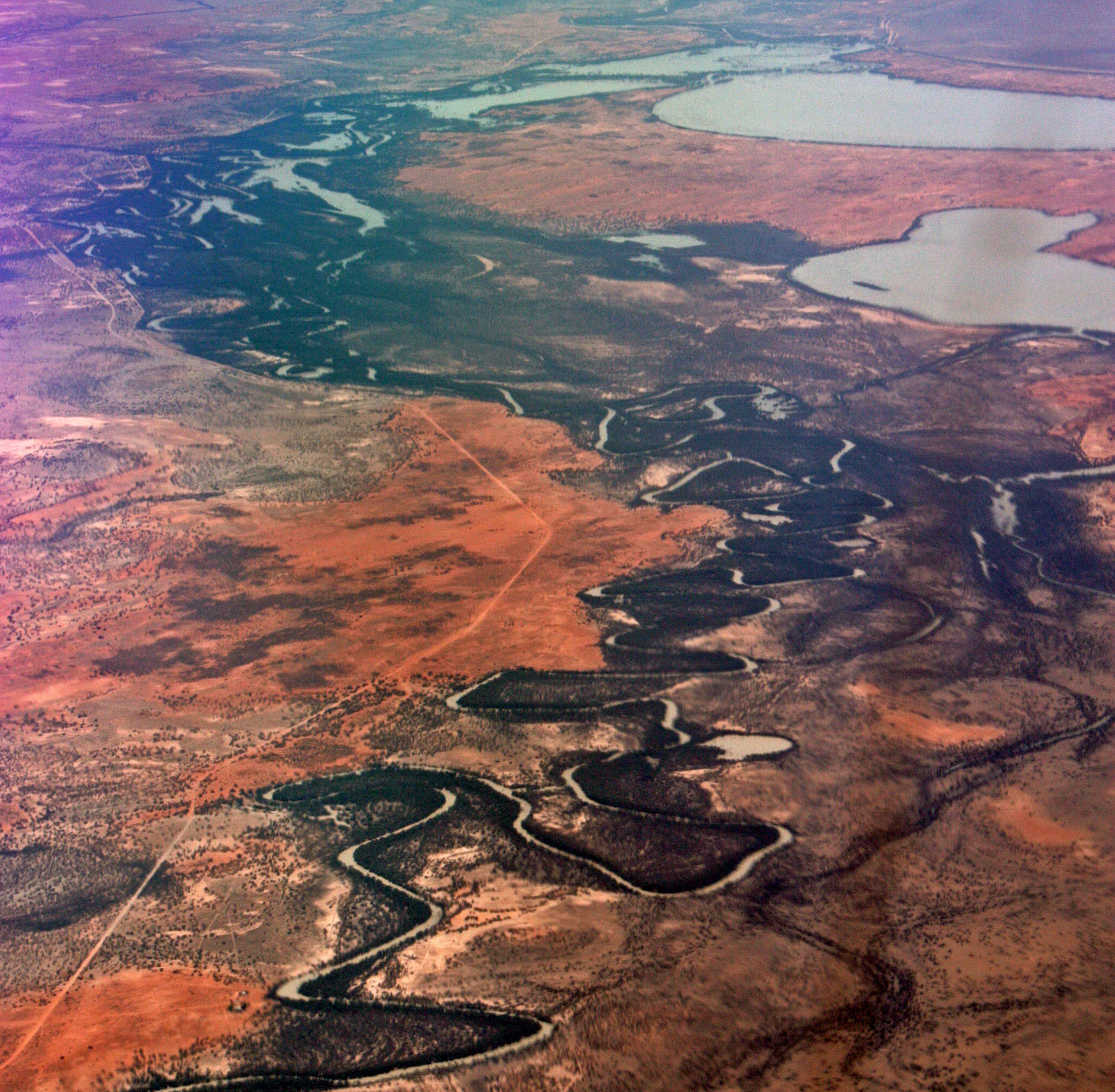
Menindee Lakes

Hume Parish, New South Wales is a cadastral parish of Tandora County in Central Darling Shire in New South Wales, Australia. The parish is located at 32°18′43″S 142°22′37″E and includes land at Lake Menindee.
