= Little Topar, New South Wales =

Little Topar
- Town
- Coordinates: 31°46′48″S 142°13′38″E
- Country: Australia
- State: New South Wales
- LGA: Unincorporated Far West Region

Government
  - State electorate: Barwon
  - Federal division: Parkes

Population
  - Total: 19 (2021 census)
- Postcode: 2880

Little Topar is a village on the Barrier Highway in Western New South Wales, between Broken Hill and Wilcannia, New South Wales.

The village is in the Tandora County.

The locality, which consisted of little more than a hotel and now a roadhouse, is named after Topar, a young Indigenous Australian man who guided Charles Sturt into the Barrier Ranges in 1844.

The roadhouse has closed its doors January 28. FB page says they still have 24/7 fuel.
