= Livingstone County, New South Wales =

Livingstone New South Wales
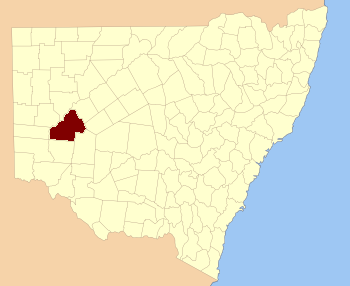
- Location in New South Wales
Lands administrative divisions around Livingstone:
| Tandora | Young | Werunda |
| Menindee | Livingstone | Woore |
| Windeyer | Perry | Manara |

Livingstone County is one of the 141 cadastral divisions of New South Wales. The Darling River is the western and north-western boundary, near Menindee.

Livingstone County was named in honour after the African missionary and explorer David Livingstone (1813–1873).

== Parishes within this county ==
A full list of parishes found within this county; their current LGA and mapping coordinates to the approximate centre of each location is as follows:

| Parish | LGA | Coordinates |
|---|---|---|
| Albemarle | Central Darling Shire | 32°19′13″S 142°39′40″E |
| Arlington | Central Darling Shire | 32°27′30″S 143°45′32″E |
| Ashbourne | Central Darling Shire | 32°19′46″S 143°23′35″E |
| Berangabah | Central Darling Shire | 32°29′45″S 143°31′58″E |
| Billitong | Central Darling Shire | 32°08′26″S 143°10′52″E |
| Bindi | Central Darling Shire | 32°27′48″S 143°12′01″E |
| Blenalben | Central Darling Shire | 32°22′43″S 143°49′06″E |
| Blenheim | Central Darling Shire | 32°21′22″S 142°31′28″E |
| Boliva | Central Darling Shire | 32°38′00″S 142°51′31″E |
| Boolaboolka | Central Darling Shire | 32°36′04″S 143°12′44″E |
| Boomery | Central Darling Shire | 32°16′03″S 143°13′47″E |
| Boonditti | Central Darling Shire | 32°21′29″S 142°56′52″E |
| Boonoona | Central Darling Shire | 32°38′47″S 143°01′52″E |
| Boothingalla | Central Darling Shire | 32°11′41″S 143°02′23″E |
| Brainerd | Central Darling Shire | 31°59′37″S 143°10′19″E |
| Brunker | Central Darling Shire | 31°56′48″S 143°04′41″E |
| Burndoo | Central Darling Shire | 32°09′35″S 143°41′52″E |
| Clifford | Central Darling Shire | 31°52′13″S 143°10′58″E |
| Connulpie | Central Darling Shire | 32°39′58″S 143°22′18″E |
| Conolly | Central Darling Shire | 32°36′22″S 142°36′31″E |
| Coveney | Central Darling Shire | 32°04′06″S 143°19′15″E |
| Cowary | Central Darling Shire | unknown |
| Culpaulin | Central Darling Shire | unknown |
| Dromore | Central Darling Shire | 32°23′21″S 143°34′20″E |
| Gemini | Central Darling Shire | 32°24′40″S 142°40′21″E |
| Gordon | Central Darling Shire | 32°25′40″S 142°50′09″E |
| Haribel | Central Darling Shire | 32°00′24″S 143°20′00″E |
| Huco | Central Darling Shire | 32°35′03″S 143°02′22″E |
| Hudson | Central Darling Shire | 32°17′53″S 143°44′48″E |
| Liddell | Central Darling Shire | 32°12′38″S 142°43′30″E |
| Makingah | Central Darling Shire | 32°32′52″S 142°37′02″E |
| Mandy | Central Darling Shire | 32°41′50″S 142°45′01″E |
| Marlborough | Central Darling Shire | 31°48′33″S 143°16′31″E |
| Marle | Central Darling Shire | 32°02′18″S 143°32′31″E |
| Minden | Central Darling Shire | 32°09′47″S 143°22′24″E |
| Mourte | Central Darling Shire | 32°31′02″S 142°46′30″E |
| Mundy | Central Darling Shire | 32°17′01″S 142°51′56″E |
| Newcome | Central Darling Shire | 32°11′14″S 142°51′16″E |
| Pysant | Central Darling Shire | 32°18′14″S 143°03′13″E |
| Repton | Central Darling Shire | 32°01′13″S 143°01′40″E |
| Sadlier | Central Darling Shire | 32°23′27″S 143°03′42″E |
| Steel | Central Darling Shire | 32°25′11″S 142°30′49″E |
| Surbiton | Central Darling Shire | 32°08′45″S 142°53′14″E |
| Talyawalka | Central Darling Shire | 32°28′57″S 142°27′25″E |
| Teryawinya | Central Darling Shire | 32°28′07″S 143°22′21″E |
| Tintinalogy | Central Darling Shire | 32°09′12″S 143°02′11″E |
| Toorincaca | Central Darling Shire | 32°32′21″S 142°52′20″E |
| Undeathi | Central Darling Shire | 32°31′18″S 142°27′11″E |
| Victoria | Central Darling Shire | 32°36′24″S 143°24′08″E |
| Wambah | Central Darling Shire | 32°24′38″S 142°25′22″E |
| Wanalla | Central Darling Shire | 32°15′34″S 143°33′20″E |
| Weatherly | Central Darling Shire | 32°04′56″S 143°09′24″E |
| Widgera | Central Darling Shire | 32°21′48″S 143°12′55″E |
| Yenda | Central Darling Shire | unknown |
