= Mulga Gaari, New South Wales =

Mulga Gaari
- Coordinates: 31°57′37.0″S 142°41′32.0″E
- Country: Australia
- State: New South Wales
- Region: Far West
- LGA: Central Darling Shire

Mulga Gaari, New South Wales is a cadastral parish of Tandora County in Central Darling Shire, Australia. Mulga Gaari is located at 31°57'37.0"S 142°41'32.0"E.
