= Worungil, New South Wales =

Rural locality in Australia

Worungil, New South Wales is a remote rural locality and civil parish of Tandora County in far West New South Wales. Worungil is located at 31°43′42″S 142°32′56″E on the Barrier Highway east of Broken Hill.
