= Quondong, New South Wales =

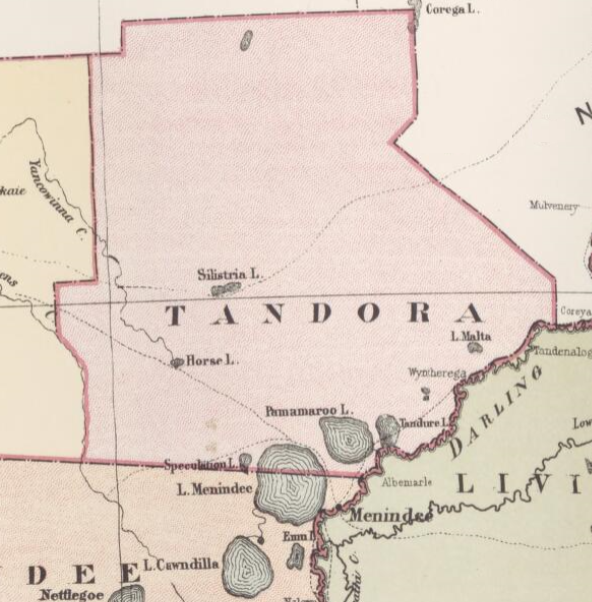
Tandora County NSW as shown on John Sands 1886 map)

Quondong, New South Wales is a remote rural locality and civil parish of Tandora County, a cadasteral division of far North West New South Wales.

Quondong, New South Wales is located at 32°16'02.0"S 141°58'40.0"E midway between Broken Hill and Menindee, New South Wales.
