= Gol Gol, New South Wales =

Gol Gol New South Wales
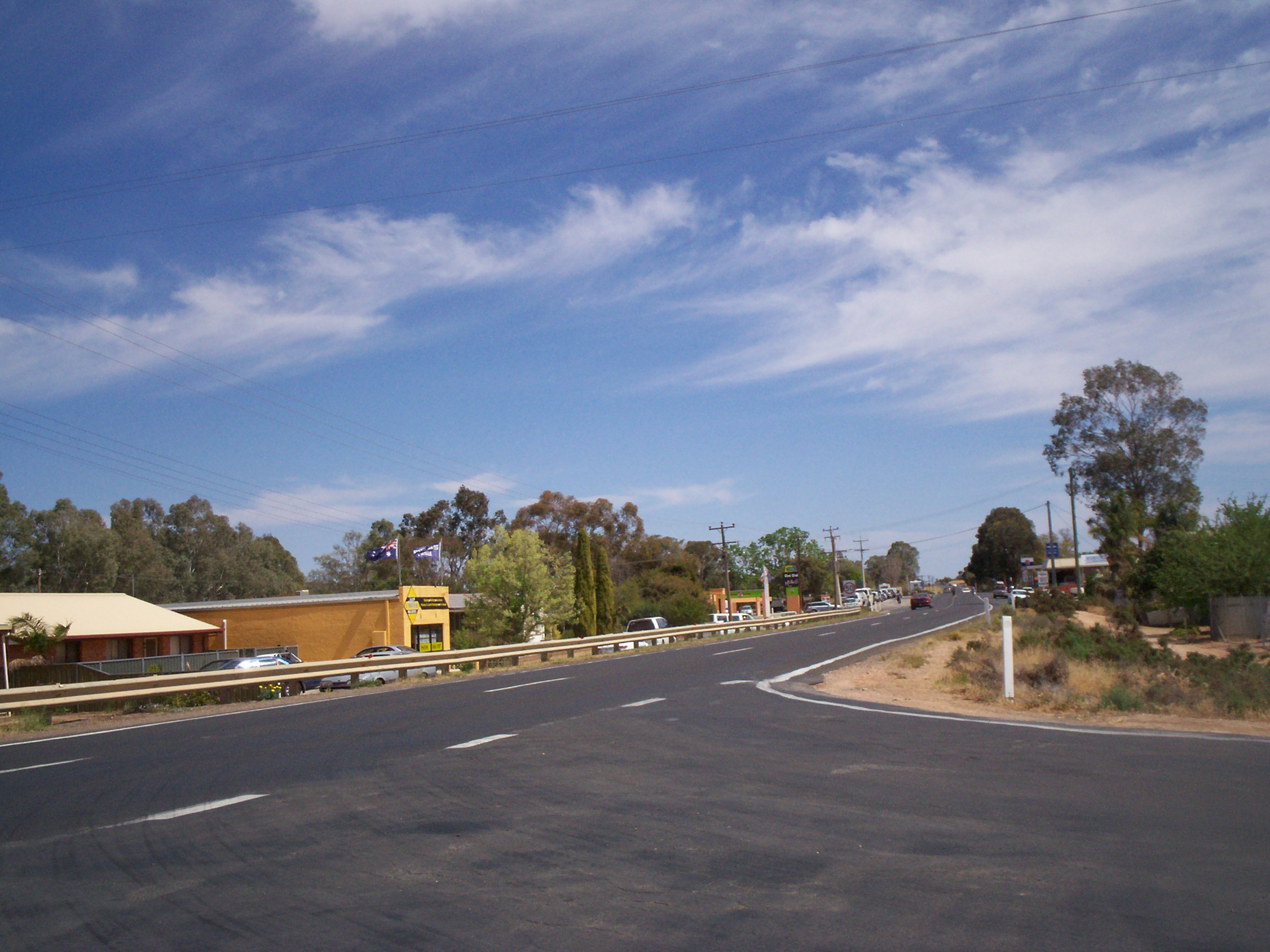
- The Sturt Highway, passing through Gol Gol

- Coordinates: 34°10′S 142°13′E
- Population: 1,956 (2021 census)
  - Density: 99.29/km^{2} (257.2/sq mi)
- Postcode(s): 2738
- Elevation: 45 m (148 ft)
- Area: 19.7 km^{2} (7.6 sq mi)
- Location: 8 km (5 mi) E of Mildura
- LGA(s): Wentworth Shire
- Region: Sunraysia
- County: Wentworth
- State electorate(s): Murray
- Federal division(s): Farrer
Localities around Gol Gol:
Buronga	Wentworth	Mallee
Buronga	Gol Gol	Mallee
Mildura	Nichols Point	Trentham Cliffs

Gol Gol is a small country town in the Wentworth Shire, in the far western region of New South Wales, Australia. It is situated on the banks of the Murray River, within the Sunraysia region. In the fifteen years from 2006 to 2021, the population of Gol Gol increased from 663 to 1,956.

The Sturt highway, an important road link for the transport of passengers and freight between Sydney and Adelaide passes through Gol Gol.

== History ==
The area has a long history of Aboriginal occupation, and was the traditional land of the Kureinji people. A well-preserved midden can be seen at Drings Hill Reserve.

On 17 March 1836, the surveyor and explorer, Thomas Mitchell, set out on an expedition from Boree Station (west of Orange), with 25 men, 2 boats, a train of bullock carts and a herd of at least 100 cattle, which were to be used for food when wild animals were scarce.

On his arrival at the site of the future village, the local Aboriginals informed Mitchell that the area next to the Murray River was called Gol Gol, meaning meeting place. Mitchell generally used Aboriginal names when marking his maps because he felt that a map was more useful if settlers could ask the local inhabitants for help. When Mitchell returned to his base camp on 4 June 1836 he passed on the name of Gol Gol to his superiors.

== Township development ==
In 1865, a survey was initiated to determine the site for the township of Gol Gol, which was completed in February 1866. The area proclaimed as the site for the township of Gol Gol was notified in the Government Gazette on 15 June 1886. Although Government land sales began in March 1871, it was almost a decade before allotments in the village were occupied. A Post Office was opened in 1877 and closed in 1879. Subsequently, a Post Office existed from 1885 to 1887, 1902 to 1919, then from 1927 until the present.

Early settlers lived along the banks of the river in crude dwellings made from Mallee boughs and branches covered with mud and bags. Others lived in tents, struggling to earn a living due to the harsh conditions.

Gradually facilities improved with the progress of communication and transport making necessary goods and materials more readily available.

In October 1881, Gol Gol was described as an under-developed township on the river Murray, populated by six families with about 25 children. The population increased steadily, especially after 1907 as a result of development of irrigation works in the area and the expansion of nearby Mildura in Victoria.

By 1917, Gol Gol and the community continued to progress and become less isolated.

== Gol Gol today ==
Gol Gol currently has a population of about 2000 people. Within the township there is a hotel, garage, general store, primary school and pre-school. The major industry of the area is irrigated horticulture, with the primary crops being citrus, vegetables and grapes.

Gol Gol has an Australian rules football team competing in the Millewa Football League.

Gol Gol also has a cricket team located at the Alcheringa Oval with excellent facilities composing 4 senior men’s cricket teams and 1 senior women’s cricket team, competing in the Sunraysia Cricket Association. The club has been extremely successful in recent years winning 7 two day premiership titles within the past 5 years.

== See also ==
- List of reduplicated Australian place names
