= Tandora County =

Tandora New South Wales
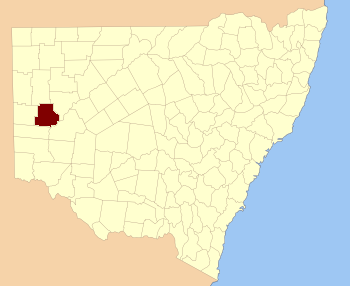
- Location in New South Wales
Lands administrative divisions around Tandora:
| Mootwingee | Mootwingee | Young |
| Yancowinna | Tandora | Livingstone |
| Menindee | Menindee | Livingstone |

Tandora County is one of the 141 cadastral divisions of New South Wales. It is located to the north west of the Darling River, to the area to the north (but not including) Menindee.

The name Tandora is of unknown origin.

== Parishes within this county ==
A full list of parishes found within this county; their current LGA and mapping coordinates to the approximate centre of each location is as follows:

| Parish | LGA | Coordinates |
|---|---|---|
| Bellar | Unincorporated | 32°08′34″S 142°16′15″E |
| Burke | Unincorporated | 31°56′18″S 142°24′03″E |
| Burnayto | Unincorporated | 31°44′00″S 142°13′48″E |
| Eckerboon | Unincorporated | 31°34′55″S 142°24′09″E |
| Hartung | Unincorporated | 32°17′21″S 142°05′46″E |
| Herbert | Unincorporated | 32°00′56″S 142°24′28″E |
| Hume | Central Darling Shire | 32°18′43″S 142°22′37″E |
| Kars | Unincorporated | 32°15′05″S 142°13′34″E |
| Maiden | Central Darling Shire | 32°08′50″S 142°26′36″E |
| Malakoff | Unincorporated | 31°52′42″S 142°35′02″E |
| Malta | Unincorporated | 31°56′28″S 142°03′24″E |
| Mulga Gaari | Central Darling Shire | 31°57′37″S 142°41′32″E |
| Mulga | Unincorporated | 32°03′22″S 142°16′15″E |
| Mutlow | Unincorporated | 31°34′59″S 142°33′08″E |
| Nadbuck | Unincorporated | 31°34′53″S 142°13′53″E |
| Nelia Gaari | Central Darling Shire | |
| Pamamaroo | Central Darling Shire | 32°05′29″S 142°35′06″E |
| Patterson | Unincorporated | 31°56′36″S 142°13′40″E |
| Quondong | Unincorporated | 32°16′02″S 141°58′40″E |
| Silistria | Unincorporated | 32°08′46″S 142°05′15″E |
| Sturt | Unincorporated | 31°43′56″S 142°24′07″E |
| Tandore | Central Darling Shire | 32°15′43″S 142°36′27″E |
| Titabaira | Central Darling Shire | 32°15′01″S 142°28′48″E |
| Topar | Unincorporated | 31°44′57″S 142°03′07″E |
| Weinteriga | Central Darling Shire | 32°10′01″S 142°39′54″E |
| Wills | Unincorporated | 31°36′18″S 142°03′32″E |
| Worungil | Unincorporated | 31°43′42″S 142°32′56″E |
