= Weinteriga, New South Wales =

Rural locality in New South Wales, Australia

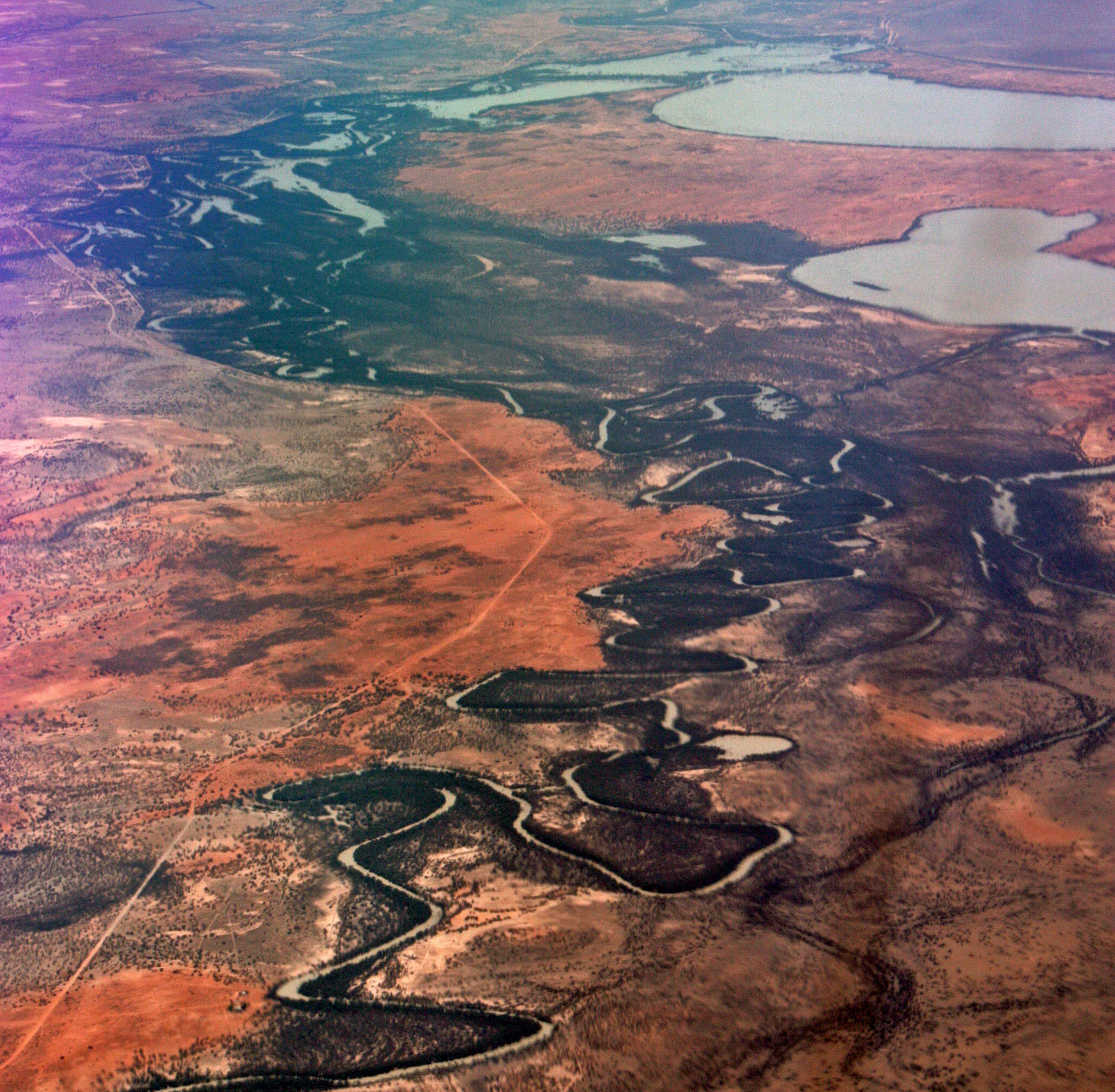
Tandore center photo

Weinteriga, New South Wales is a remote rural locality of Central Darling Shire and civil parish of Tandora County. It is located on the Menindee Lakes to the north west of the Darling River, to the area to the north of Menindee.
