= Topar =

Indigenous Australian explorer

Topar (1826 – ?) was an Indigenous Australian of the Barkandji people from the Menindee Lakes region of the Darling River.

As a child in 1835 he witnessed the British exploratory group led by Thomas Mitchell enter his country and kill at least three of his kin in a dispute over a kettle.

In 1844, at the age of eighteen, he volunteered to lead another explorer, Charles Sturt, into the barren region northwest of the Darling River.

Topar led Sturt's group into the Barrier Ranges locating watersources and food. Sturt had an ambivalent attitude toward Topar, whom he admired for his youthful confidence and physical dexterity, but also disparaged for his impulsiveness and pilfering.

British colonists were soon able to exploit Topar's path into the Barrier Ranges, allowing pastoralists to establish the Mount Gipps Station and other runs. The mining industry later became prominent with the foundation of the world famous Broken Hill mines.

Topar Hill, Topar pastoral station and the locality of Little Topar east of Broken Hill are named in his honour.

== See also ==
- List of Indigenous Australian historical figures
