= Pooncarie =

- Town
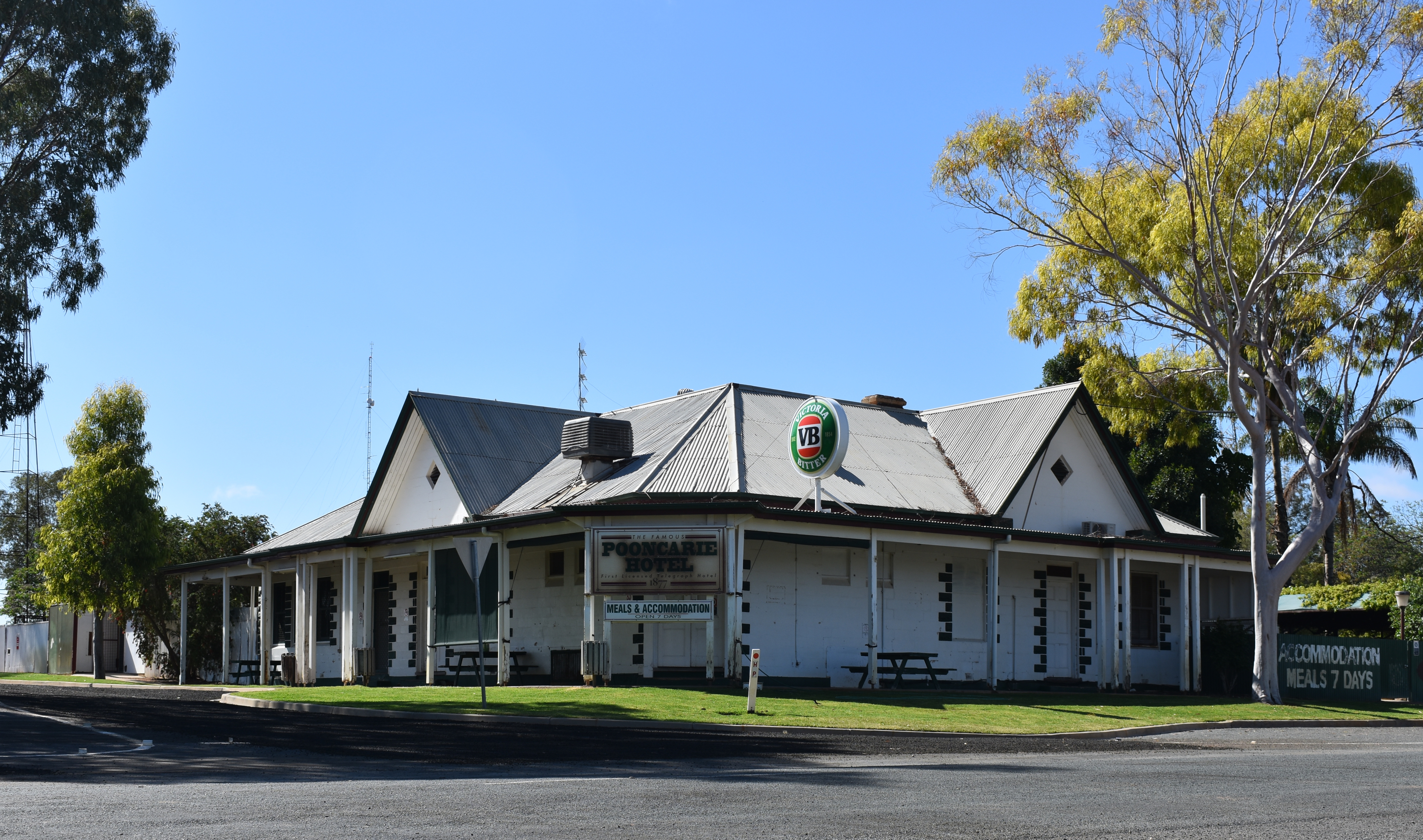
- Pooncarie Hotel, 2021

- Coordinates: 33°23′S 142°34′E
- Country: Australia
- State: New South Wales
- LGA: Wentworth Shire
- Location: 1,159 km (720 mi) from Sydney; 230 km (140 mi) from Broken Hill; 152 km (94 mi) from Mildura; 120 km (75 mi) from Wentworth
- Established: 1863

Government
  - State electorate: Murray
  - Federal division: Farrer
- Elevation: 56 m (184 ft)

Population
  - Total: 226 (2021 census)
- Postcode: 2648

Pooncarie is a village in south-western New South Wales, Australia in Wentworth Shire. It is on the eastern side of the Darling River between Wentworth and Menindee. The surrounding region of Pooncarie is semi-arid with an outback landscape rich in eucalypt woodlands. At the 2021 census, Pooncarie had a population of 226 people.

== History ==
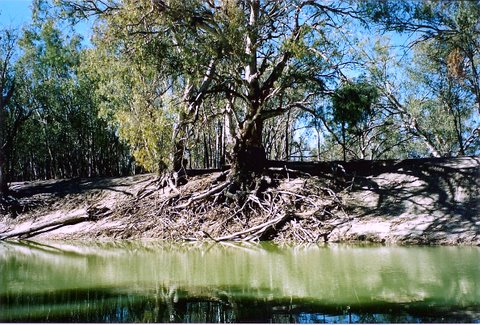
Darling River at Pooncarie, river height 1.5 metres

The region was first settled by Europeans during the 1840s when they took up illegal grazing runs on crown land. During the 1860s the government formalised these illegal (and unfenced) claims in an attempt to gain control of the region. As more settlers followed the town became a service hub for outlying stations. In the mid-19th century, the town's Darling River wharf was very active as paddle-steamers carried wool from north-western NSW and south-western Queensland, travelling through the port on the way to South Australia.

The Burke and Wills expedition passed through Pooncarie on their journey across Australia from Melbourne to the Gulf of Carpentaria. They reached the Darling River near Tarcoola Station to the south of town on Wednesday, 26 September 1860 and the next day made Camp XXX (their thirtieth camp since leaving Melbourne) at what is now Bilbarka Park. The expedition stayed here until the morning of 11 October 1860 when they headed north to Menindee.

In 1863 the town was originally gazetted as "Pooncaira".

Popiltah station, 80 km north-west of Pooncarie, was the relocation site of Nanya and his family, one of the last peoples to live by traditional indigenous means in New South Wales.

Pooncarie is approximately 40 kilometres (25 mi) east of, and the closest centre to, the burgeoning BEMAX Resources Ginkgo Mineral Sands mine on Malara Station. The mine commenced partial operations in December 2005.

Today the village has a postal centre and Centrelink office (which is housed in the former Pooncarie police station), a school, a cafe (situated overlooking the Darling river at the historic Old Wharf site), a hotel, a golf course, a tennis court, a general store, a cemetery, and a racecourse, where the Pooncarie Cup - held on Labour Day (NSW and SA) - attracts a crowd of over 1,500 enthusiasts.

Pooncarie is the closest centre to Mungo National Park which is 88 kilometres (55 mi) away, and fuel is available at the store which reopened in July 2013.

== Heritage listings ==
Wentworth Shire has a number of heritage-listed sites, including:

- Darling River, Polia Station, Pooncarie: PS Rodney

== Climate ==
Pooncarie has a hot desert climate (BWh) under the Köppen climate classification, featuring very hot, dry summers and short, cool winters. The annual average rainfall is 267.7 millimetres (10.5 in).

Climate data for Pooncarie Mail Agency (2002–2026)
Month	Jan	Feb	Mar	Apr	May	Jun	Jul	Aug	Sep	Oct	Nov	Dec	Year
Record high °C (°F)	49.7 (121.5)	47.6 (117.7)	43.0 (109.4)	40.5 (104.9)	30.3 (86.5)	27.0 (80.6)	27.2 (81.0)	31.0 (87.8)	39.0 (102.2)	40.5 (104.9)	46.2 (115.2)	47.3 (117.1)	49.7 (121.5)
Mean daily maximum °C (°F)	35.9 (96.6)	34.5 (94.1)	30.9 (87.6)	26.3 (79.3)	21.0 (69.8)	17.3 (63.1)	17.3 (63.1)	19.3 (66.7)	23.4 (74.1)	27.3 (81.1)	30.9 (87.6)	33.7 (92.7)	26.5 (79.7)
Mean daily minimum °C (°F)	19.3 (66.7)	18.3 (64.9)	15.3 (59.5)	11.3 (52.3)	7.4 (45.3)	5.1 (41.2)	4.4 (39.9)	5.4 (41.7)	7.9 (46.2)	11.1 (52.0)	14.5 (58.1)	16.9 (62.4)	11.4 (52.5)
Record low °C (°F)	8.0 (46.4)	9.6 (49.3)	6.8 (44.2)	2.0 (35.6)	−1.8 (28.8)	−3.0 (26.6)	−3.7 (25.3)	−2.2 (28.0)	−0.8 (30.6)	0.9 (33.6)	1.5 (34.7)	7.0 (44.6)	−3.7 (25.3)
Average precipitation mm (inches)	22.8 (0.90)	22.6 (0.89)	17.9 (0.70)	18.2 (0.72)	25.6 (1.01)	25.3 (1.00)	21.8 (0.86)	22.7 (0.89)	21.8 (0.86)	26.1 (1.03)	21.7 (0.85)	21.2 (0.83)	267.7 (10.54)
Average precipitation days	2.6	2.5	2.6	2.9	4.5	5.4	5.5	5.4	4.4	4.3	3.6	3.0	46.7
Source: Bureau of Meteorology

== See also ==
- Burke and Wills expedition
