= Arumpo =

- Town
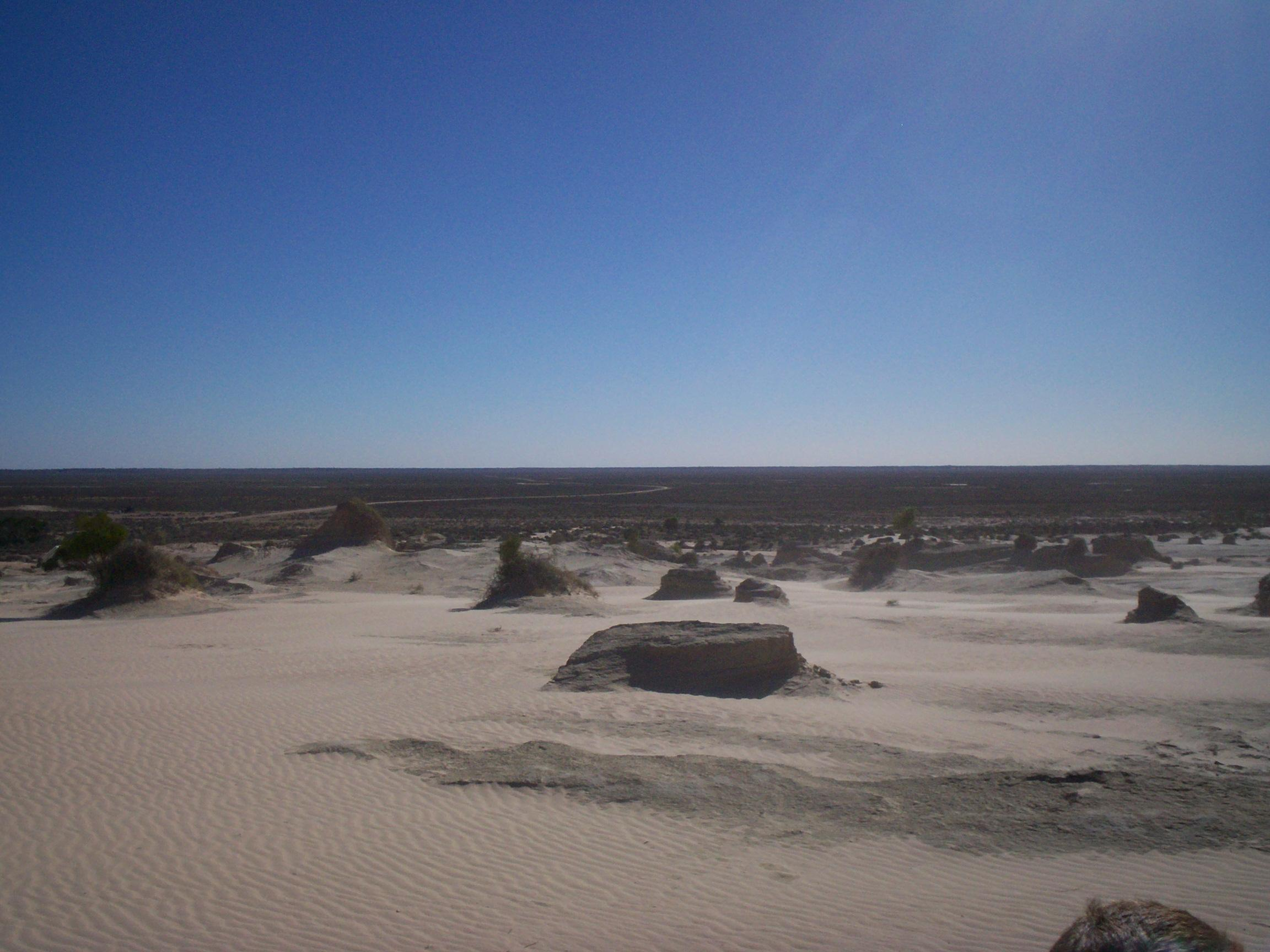
- Mungo National Park, looking south towards Arumpo and Mildura

- Coordinates: 33°52′S 142°53′E
- Country: Australia
- State: New South Wales
- LGA: Wentworth Shire
- Location: 1,092 km (679 mi) from Sydney; 877 km (545 mi) from Canberra; 86 km (53 mi) from Mildura; 108 km (67 mi) from Wentworth

Government
  - State electorate: Murray
  - Federal division: Farrer

Population
  - Total: 40
- Postcode: 2715

Arumpo is a locality in New South Wales, Australia, approximately 86 kilometres (53 mi) north-east of Mildura, Victoria. The Willandra Lakes Region, including Mungo National Park, is near Arumpo. The Tronox titanium/mineral sand mine is located 16 km south of Arumpo, trucking ore to freight trains at Ivanhoe, New South Wales.
