= Mourquong =

- Town
- Coordinates: 34°08′19″S 142°09′46″E
- Country: Australia
- State: New South Wales
- LGA: Wentworth Shire

Government
  - Federal division: Farrer

Population
  - Total: 79
- Postcode: 2739

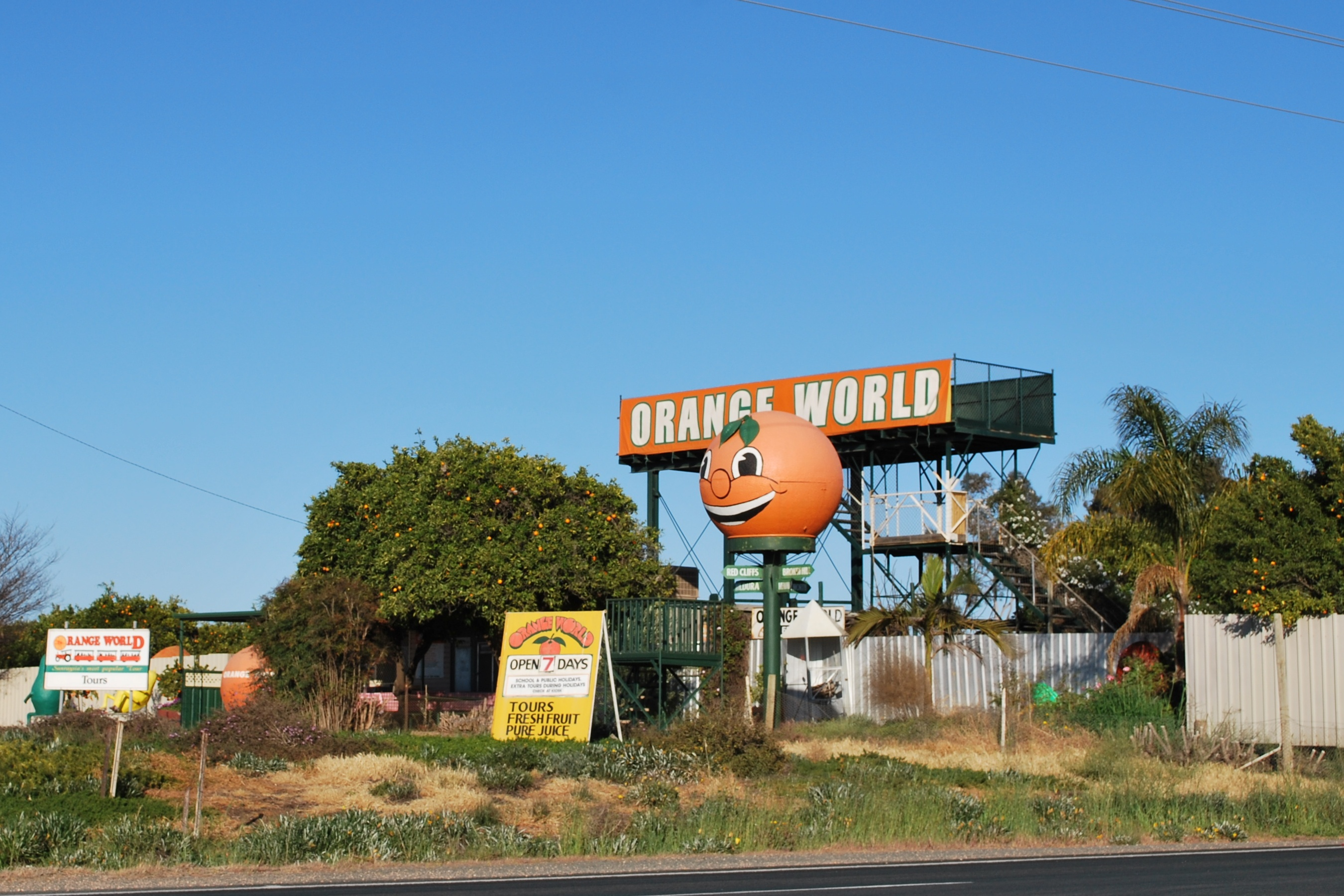
Orange World at Mourquong.

Mourquong is a locality in New South Wales, Australia on the Murray River just over the bridge from Mildura, Victoria, near Buronga.

Major public sites in Mourquong are often described as being in Buronga, when officially they are not. "Mourquong" is an older name for the broader area, while "Buronga" was a name given to the township that later formed on the other side of the Murray River from Mildura (hence its earlier name "Mildura Bridge").

The Mourquong Irrigation Area is a distinct area, though without well-known infrastructure like a shop or school.

== Attractions ==
Orange World, the Australian Inland Botanic Gardens and The Big Wine Cask are all located in Mourquong.

There are also two large wineries (Buronga Hill and Stanley Wines), though neither have cellar doors open to the public. "Sunraysia Cellar Door", a business in Mildura, stocks their wines.
