= Trust for Nature =

- Founded: 1972
- Type: not-for-profit
- Purpose: Protection of native plants and wildlife in Victoria
- Location: Victoria
- Website: www.trustfornature.org.au
- Formerly called: Victorian Conservation Trust

Trust for Nature is a not-for-profit organisation in the Australian state of Victoria which protects native plants and wildlife in co-operation with private landowners. The Trust was established under the Victorian Conservation Trust Act 1972 to enable people to contribute permanently to nature conservation by donating land or money. Trust for Nature has since evolved into one of Victoria's primary private land conservation organisations.

== Purpose ==
The Trust's mission states, 'Trust for Nature exists to achieve more and better private land conservation in Victoria'.

Trust for Nature's vision is 'a future where Victoria’s nature is valued, protected, and thriving'.

== Conservation tools ==
Trust for Nature has several mechanisms to achieve conservation gains on private land:

1. Conservation covenants: Private landowners protect quality native vegetation on their land by placing a covenant on the title, legally protecting the land in perpetuity. Trust for Nature developed conservation covenants in 1978 as a tool to protect native plants and wildlife on private land. Conservation covenants are backed by Victorian State legislation through the Victorian Conservation Trust Act 1972. The Trust currently has more than 1,800 conservation covenants in effect which protect more than 82,000 hectares of private land. As of 1 January 2024, land covered by a Trust for Nature conservation covenant is exempt from land tax in Victoria.
2. Stewardship program: Land management advice and information is provided to landowners who own a property protected by a conservation covenant. In 2026, the Trust launched a statewide small grants program exclusively dedicated to assisting landholders with a conservation covenant.
3. Revolving Fund: The Trust purchases land of high vegetation quality and on-sells the property with a covenant attached. Proceeds from the sale go back into the Revolving Fund. The Trust has purchased and preserved more than 55 properties across Victoria through its Revolving Fund.
4. Land acquisition: Trust for Nature acquires land of high conservation value and manages it with the help of volunteers. Trust-owned properties are often used for open days and education purposes, demonstrating land conservation practices. Private landholders regularly donate properties (both with and without natural values) to the Trust to support its mission.
5. Conservation reserves owned by the Trust: The Trust currently owns and manages over 40 properties that cover over 36,000 hectares of Victoria, including Neds Corner Station - the largest private conservation property in Victoria.
6. Nature Markets: The Trust administers native vegetation offset agreements between private landowners and proponents who have an offset requirement. Landowners receive a payment from the proponent to improve native vegetation quality on their land. Trust for Nature is collaborating with Cassinia Environmental on the $77M Bushbank program, restoring over 20,000 hectares of land across Victoria to create biodiverse habitat and capture carbon, funded by the Victorian Government. Trust for Nature permanently protects the land being restored with conservation covenants to secure and steward this significant investment.

== Regions ==
Trust for Nature operates within Victoria's ten catchment areas, often in partnership with the region's Catchment Management Authority (CMA).

The 10 CMA regions covering Victoria are:

- Corangamite
- East Gippsland
- Glenelg Hopkins
- Goulburn Broken
- Mallee
- North Central
- North East
- Port Phillip and Westernport
- West Gippsland
- Wimmera

== Chairs of Trust for Nature ==
No.	Chair	Term	Notes	Ref.
1	Unknown	1972–?		
2	Unknown	?–?		
3	Unknown	?–?		
4	Brian Snape	c.1980s	Oversaw the organisation during its early development and was involved in the adoption of the name Trust for Nature in 1985.	
	Janet Limb	2004 - 2006		
	Jim Hondros	2006 - 2008		
	Tom Tootell	2008 - 2009		
	Camilla Graves	2009 - 2015		
	Max Ervin	2015 - 2017		
	Geoff Driver	2017 - 2019		
	Gayle Austen	2019 - 2023		
	Andrew Brookes	2023 - 2025		
