= Young County, New South Wales =

Young New South Wales
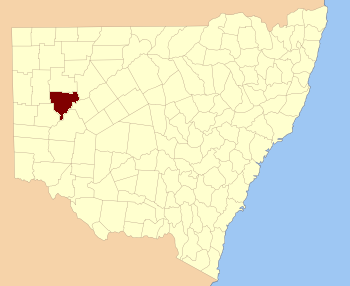
- Location in New South Wales
Lands administrative divisions around Young:
Mootwingee	Yungnulgra	Killara
Mootwingee	Young	Werunda
Tandora	Livingstone	Livingstone

Young County is one of the 141 cadastral divisions of New South Wales. It includes the area to the west of Wilcannia. The Darling River is the south-eastern boundary.

Young County was named in honour of the twelfth Governor of New South Wales, Sir John Young, First Baron Lisgar (1807–1876).

Most, but not all of the country is incorporated with the seat of local government being located at Willcannia.

== Parishes within this county ==
A full list of parishes found within this county; their current LGA and mapping coordinates to the approximate centre of each location is as follows:

Parish	LGA	Coordinates
Ardennes	Unincorporated	31°24′20″S 142°38′27″E
Barbston	Central Darling Shire	31°11′21″S 143°02′42″E
Baroorangee	Unincorporated	31°13′50″S 142°28′52″E
Blanche	Unincorporated	31°13′56″S 142°35′44″E
Blumenthal	Central Darling Shire	31°31′12″S 143°07′00″E
Bonley	Central Darling Shire	31°49′31″S 143°05′13″E
Brougham	Central Darling Shire	31°27′37″S 143°13′52″E
Broughton	Unincorporated	31°38′06″S 142°39′29″E
Bungaroo	Unincorporated	31°30′37″S 142°31′49″E
Cameron	Central Darling Shire	31°18′36″S 143°13′05″E
Clayton	Unincorporated	31°38′42″S 142°45′23″E
Cobrilla	Central Darling Shire	
Comarto	Central Darling Shire	31°25′18″S 142°46′55″E
Corega	Central Darling Shire	32°03′16″S 142°55′10″E
Coromerry	Central Darling Shire	31°38′59″S 143°17′48″E
Culpaulin	Central Darling Shire	
Cuthowara	Unincorporated	31°35′39″S 142°45′22″E
Dalglish	Central Darling Shire	31°41′22″S 142°52′10″E
Darling	Central Darling Shire	31°22′10″S 143°19′26″E
Daubeny	Unincorporated	31°16′07″S 142°41′50″E
Desailly	Central Darling Shire	31°34′39″S 143°12′57″E
Dickens	Central Darling Shire	31°30′32″S 143°00′26″E
Dry Lake	Central Darling Shire	31°24′59″S 143°12′40″E
Evelyn	Central Darling Shire	31°21′01″S 143°25′14″E
Garland	Central Darling Shire	31°38′55″S 143°11′50″E
Goode	Central Darling Shire	31°09′32″S 143°29′01″E
Greville	Unincorporated	31°33′09″S 142°39′27″E
Griffiths	Unincorporated	31°18′46″S 142°39′49″E
Jennings	Central Darling Shire	31°34′33″S 142°52′41″E
Kambula	Central Darling Shire	31°16′32″S 143°32′44″E
King	Central Darling Shire	31°49′01″S 142°58′29″E
Kopago	Central Darling Shire	31°14′39″S 143°26′55″E
Loftus	Unincorporated	31°23′26″S 142°29′20″E
Mackenzie	Central Darling Shire	31°44′12″S 143°00′07″E
Mitchell	Central Darling Shire	31°23′22″S 142°54′12″E
Moorabin	Central Darling Shire	31°29′51″S 143°29′48″E
Moorguinnia	Central Darling Shire	31°16′52″S 142°55′04″E
Morriset	Central Darling Shire	31°29′47″S 142°53′19″E
Mulga	Central Darling Shire	31°42′58″S 143°07′52″E
Mulyenery	Central Darling Shire	31°54′05″S 142°57′12″E
Murchison	Central Darling Shire	31°24′02″S 143°19′25″E
Netallie	Central Darling Shire	31°41′00″S 143°15′48″E
Paradise	Central Darling Shire	31°50′58″S 142°44′14″E
Parkes	Central Darling Shire	31°46′03″S 142°51′34″E
Peveril	Central Darling Shire	31°13′04″S 142°48′38″E
Robinson	Central Darling Shire	31°37′07″S 142°59′33″E
Sutherland	Central Darling Shire	31°36′00″S 143°06′22″E
Tallandra	Central Darling Shire	31°24′11″S 143°40′25″E
Ultimo	Central Darling Shire	31°52′57″S 142°51′11″E
Waltragalda	Central Darling Shire	31°26′19″S 143°24′40″E
Wilcannia	Central Darling Shire	31°29′02″S 143°21′22″E
Willis	Central Darling Shire	31°39′36″S 143°00′43″E
Wood	Central Darling Shire	31°18′03″S 143°06′52″E
Woore	Central Darling Shire	31°21′05″S 143°32′56″E
Woorungil	Unincorporated	31°46′14″S 142°37′33″E
Woytchugga	Central Darling Shire	
Young	Central Darling Shire	31°21′09″S 142°47′12″E
Yungnulgra	Central Darling Shire	31°23′38″S 143°00′38″E
