= Trentham Cliffs =

Coordinates: 34°13′S 142°15′E

- Town
- Country: Australia
- State: New South Wales
- Location: 1,001 km (622 mi) from Sydney; 786 km (488 mi) from Canberra; 10 km (6.2 mi) from Mildura; 60 km (37 mi) from Wentworth

Government
  - Federal division: Farrer

Population
  - Total: 85 (SAL 2021)
- Postcode: 2738

Trentham Cliffs is a locality in New South Wales, Australia, located approximately 10 km north-east of Mildura, Victoria.
