= Tolarno Station =

Agricultural station in New South Wales

Tolarno station is a station in west New South Wales situated about 440 km east-northeast of Adelaide, about 800 km west of Sydney. Peppora is at an altitude of approximately 57m. Tolarno Station is one of the westernmost homesteads in New South Wales.

== History ==
Tolarno Stations is on the traditional land of the Barkindji people.

The first selectors arrived in the Tolarno and Peppora region in the late 1830s and by the 1890s a small town had grown on near by Tolarno Station, that included, with outer offices, stores, stables, a blacksmith shop, saddlers shop, cart shed, chaff stores, shearing shed and shearers quarters, bachelors quarters and a large fruit and vegetable garden to feed the community.

A school was developed to educate the children station workers, and those on neighbouring stations. At its peak, the Station was also home to 3 hotels.

During the 1894 shearers strike, workers from the station were involved in a number of violent actions in Moorara Station (45 km downstream).

During the 2019 drought the station ran out of water amid fears of degraded water quality in the river.

== See also ==
- Ross T. Reid
