= Palinyewah =

- Town
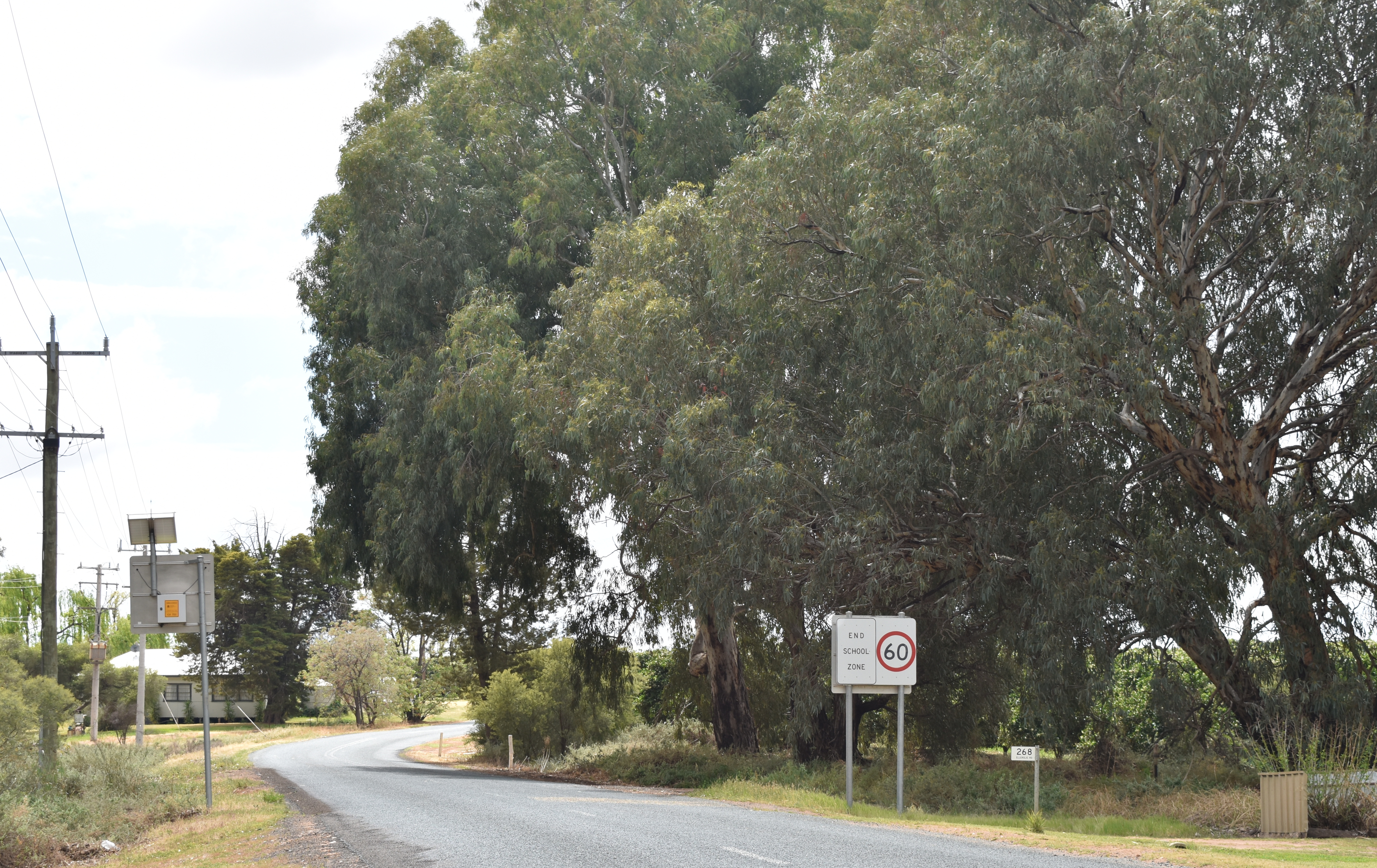
- Entering Palinyewah along Ellerslie Road

- Coordinates: 33°50′0″S 142°1′0″E
- Country: Australia
- State: New South Wales
- LGA: Wentworth Shire
- Location: 1,085 km (674 mi) from Sydney; 870 km (540 mi) from Canberra; 78 km (48 mi) from Mildura; 47 km (29 mi) from Wentworth

Government
  - State electorate: Murray
  - Federal division: Farrer

Population
  - Total: 82 (2016 census)
- Postcode: 2648
Localities around Palinyewah
9
Palinyewah

Palinyewah (also known as Ellerslie) is a locality in New South Wales, Australia, located approximately 47 km north-east of Wentworth, New South Wales. The area is largely devoted to citrus fruit production.

The Palinyewah Public School opened in May, 1954, starting out in a small shed on a nearby farm.
