= Wentworth Shire =

- Local government area
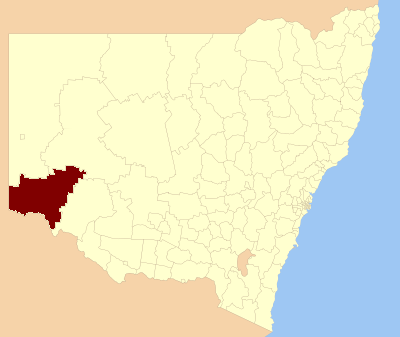
- Location in New South Wales

- Interactive map of Wentworth Shire
- Coordinates: 34°05′S 141°54′E
- Country: Australia
- State: New South Wales
- Region: Far West
- Established: 23 January 1879
- Council seat: Wentworth

Government
  - Mayor: Daniel Linklater (Independent)
  - State electorate: Murray
  - Federal division: Farrer

Area
  - Total: 26,269 km^{2} (10,143 sq mi)

Population
  - Total: 7,453 (LGA 2021)
  - Density: 0.26/km^{2} (0.67/sq mi)
- Website: Wentworth Shire
LGAs around Wentworth Shire
OACDT (SA)	Unincorporated Far West	Central Darling
OACDT (SA)	Wentworth Shire	Balranald
Renmark Paringa (SA)	Mildura (Vic)	Mildura (Vic)

Wentworth Shire is a local government area in the far south-west Riverina region of New South Wales, Australia. This Shire is located adjacent to the Murray and Darling Rivers. The Shire's major roads are the Sturt and the Silver City Highways. The Shire includes the towns of Wentworth, Buronga, Gol Gol, Dareton and Pooncarie. The shire's namesake is explorer and politician William Wentworth.

The mayor of Wentworth Shire Council is Daniel Linklater, an independent politician.

== Heritage listings ==
Wentworth Shire has a number of heritage-listed sites, including:

- Darling River, Polia Station, Pooncarie: PS Rodney
- Wentworth, 112 Beverley Street: Wentworth Gaol
- Wentworth, 30 Caddell Street: St Ignatius School
- Wentworth, Darling Street: St John's Anglican Church, Wentworth
- Wentworth, 1122a Low Darling Road: Avoca Homestead Complex

== Council ==
The area of Wentworth was proclaimed a municipality on 23 January 1879. The first Mayor was Mr. W. Gunn who held office from 1879 to 1880.

=== Current composition and election method ===
Wentworth Shire Council is composed of nine councillors elected proportionally as a single ward. All councillors are elected for a fixed four-year term of office. The mayor is elected by the councillors at the first meeting of the council. The most recent election was held on 4 December 2021 and the current makeup of the council is as follows:

Party	Councillors
Independents	6
Independent National	2
Vacant	1
Total	9

One seat is vacant following the death of councillor Stephen Heywood on 7 February 2024.

The current council, elected in 2021, in order of election, is:

Councillor	Party	Notes
Peter Crisp	Independent National	
Steve Cooper	Independent	
Tim Elstone	Independent	
Daniel Linklater	Independent National	Mayor 2023–
Susan Nichols	Independent	Deputy Mayor 2023–
Greg Evans	Independent	
Brian Beaumont	Independent	
Jo Rodda	Independent	

== Election results ==
=== 2024 ===
2024 New South Wales local elections: Wentworth
Party	Candidate	Votes	%	±%
Independent National	Daniel Linklater (elected)	1,496	44.9	+19.8
Independent National	Peter Crisp (elected)	416	12.5	−2.4
Independent	Tim Elstone (elected)	384	11.5	−0.3
Independent	Jo Rodda (elected)	170	5.1	+1.0
Independent	Susan Nichols (elected)	151	4.5	−1.4
Independent	Michael Weeding (elected)	130	3.9	
Independent	Brian Beaumont	114	3.4	−1.9
Independent National	Bill Wheeldon	111	3.3	−1.0
Independent National	Jon Armstrong (elected)	105	3.2	
Independent	Greg Evans (elected)	103	3.1	−0.7
Independent	Jody Starick (elected)	78	2.3	
Independent	Ivan Behsmann	76	2.3	
Total formal votes		3,334	96.3	
Informal votes		127	3.7	
Turnout		3,461	73.7	

== Localities ==
Locality population	2016	2021
Arumpo	34	40
Buronga	1,212	1,252
Curlwaa	393	496
Dareton	501	456
Ellerslie	82	56
Gol Gol	1,523	1,596
Mourquong	79	75
Pomona	161	167
Pooncarie	166	226
Wentworth	1,437	1,577
