= Bambill South =

Coordinates: 34°30′36″S 141°30′07″E

Bambill South Victoria
- Postcode(s): 3496
- Location: 537 km (334 mi) from Melbourne; 90 km (56 mi) from Mildura; 19 km (12 mi) from Tarrango; 6 km (4 mi) from Kurnwill
- LGA(s): Rural City of Mildura
- Region: Millewa
- State electorate(s): Mildura
- Federal division(s): Mallee

Bambill South is a locality situated on the Bambill South Road in the Sunraysia region. The place by road, is about 6 kilometres east from Kurnwill and 19 kilometres west from Tarrango. Many farmers such as Mangans, Stanbrooks, and Hards settled in the area.

== See also ==
- Werrimull, Victoria
