= Morkalla railway line =

Former railway line in Victoria, Australia

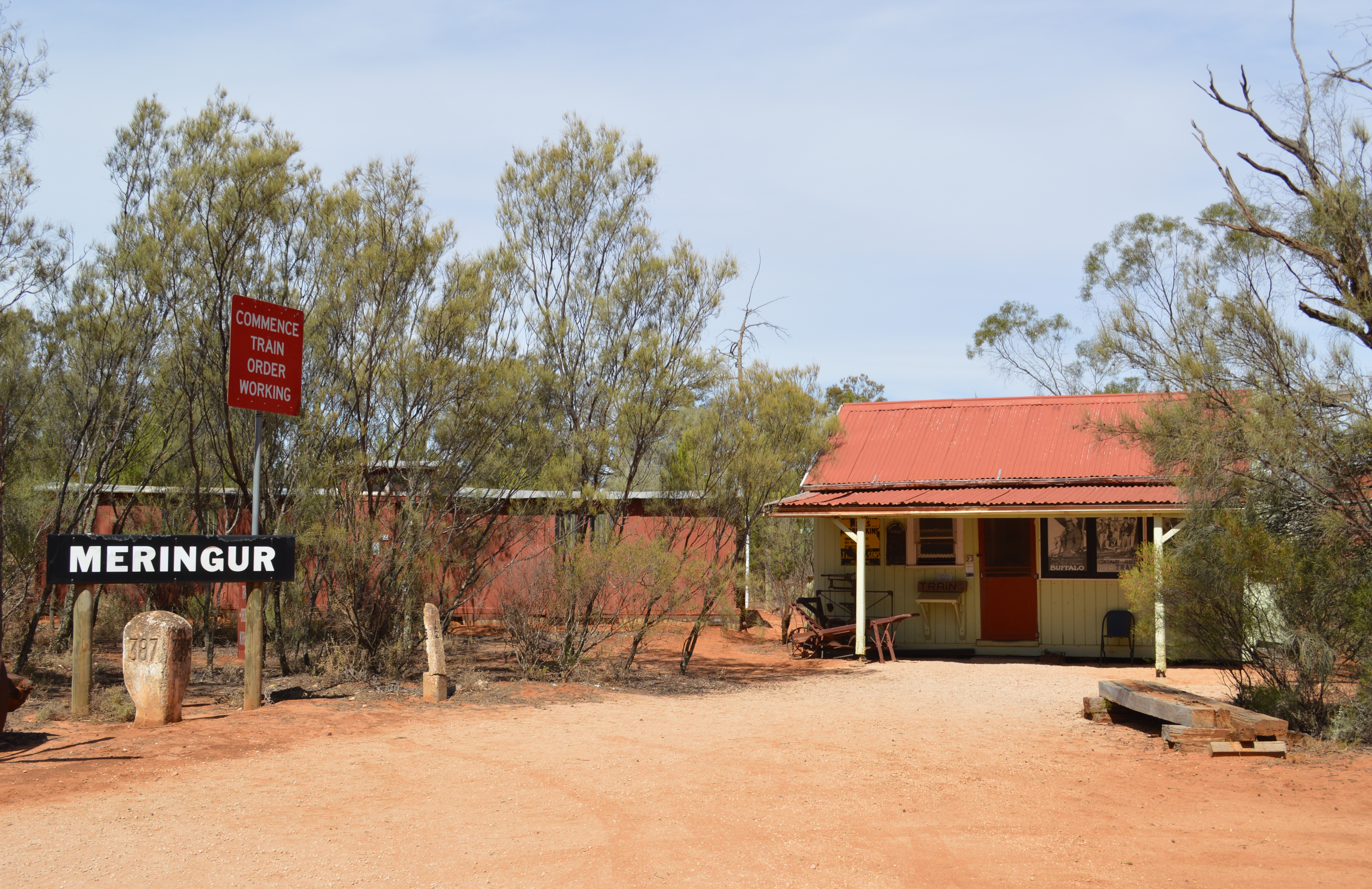
- Meringur Railway Station, relocated to Meringur Pioneer Village

Overview
- Status: Closed
- Owner: Victorian Railways
- Locale: Millewa
- Coordinates: 34°18′28″S 142°11′10″E
- Termini: Red Cliffs; Morkalla

History
- Opened: 10 April 1924 (to Werrimull)
- Extended to Meringur: October 1925
- Extended to Morkalla: 1931
- Closed: 1988

Technical
- Line length: 97.4 km (60.5 mi)
- Number of tracks: Single track
- Track gauge: 1,600 mm (5 ft 3 in)

The Morkalla railway line was a railway in the Millewa region of north-western Victoria, Australia. It extended west from Red Cliffs railway station on the Mildura railway line into wheat farming areas established as soldier settlements after World War I.

The line opened initially with limited services to Karawinna in 1923. An extension to Werrimull was officially opened to general traffic on 10 April 1924, and it was further extended to Meringur in October 1925. The final extension was to Morkalla, which opened in June 1931. As the towns along the line shrank, due to reduced populations caused by increasing farm size and mechanisation, the line became used only on a seasonal basis, and was closed completely in 1988. The Red Cliffs to Meringur section was dismantled during 1990 and 1991.

A 2-kilometre (1.2 mi) section of the line near Red Cliffs has been rebuilt in a 610 mm (2 ft) narrow gauge by the Red Cliffs Historical Steam Railway, which operates monthly tourist services, using heritage locomotives.

There were several proposals to extend the line across the border into South Australia to connect with the South Australian Mallee railways, either joining the line to Renmark near Paringa, or as an extension of the Peebinga railway line. There was support from South Australians in the Riverland region to achieve the connection, but it appears not to have been supported by the state government of the day.

== Route ==
The line began at Red Cliffs, 16 kilometres (9.9 mi) south of Mildura. It ran roughly west, 10–12 km south of what is now the Sturt Highway.

Towns and settlements along the line included:

- Thurla
- Benetook
- Pirlta
- Merrinee
- Karawinna
- Werrimull
- Bambill
- Yarrara
- Meringur
- Karween
- Morkalla
