= Benetook =

Coordinates: 34°22′0″S 142°0′0″E

Benetook Victoria
- Postcode(s): 3496
- Elevation: 70 m (230 ft)
- Location: 545 km (339 mi) northwest of Melbourne; 25 km (16 mi) southwest of Mildura; 9 km (6 mi) west of Thurla; 8 km (5 mi) east of Pirlta
- LGA(s): Rural City of Mildura
- Region: Sunraysia
- State electorate(s): Mildura
- Federal division(s): Mallee

Benetook is a locality in the Sunraysia region about 9 kilometres west of Thurla and 8 kilometres east of Pirlta.

The Post Office opened around 1925. The building was destroyed by fire in 1929, and the office was closed in 1946. Benetook was on the Morkalla railway line. The station opened with the first section of the line in 1924, with facilities for passengers, goods and grain. It closed in 1970.
