= Yelta, Victoria =

Yelta
- Town
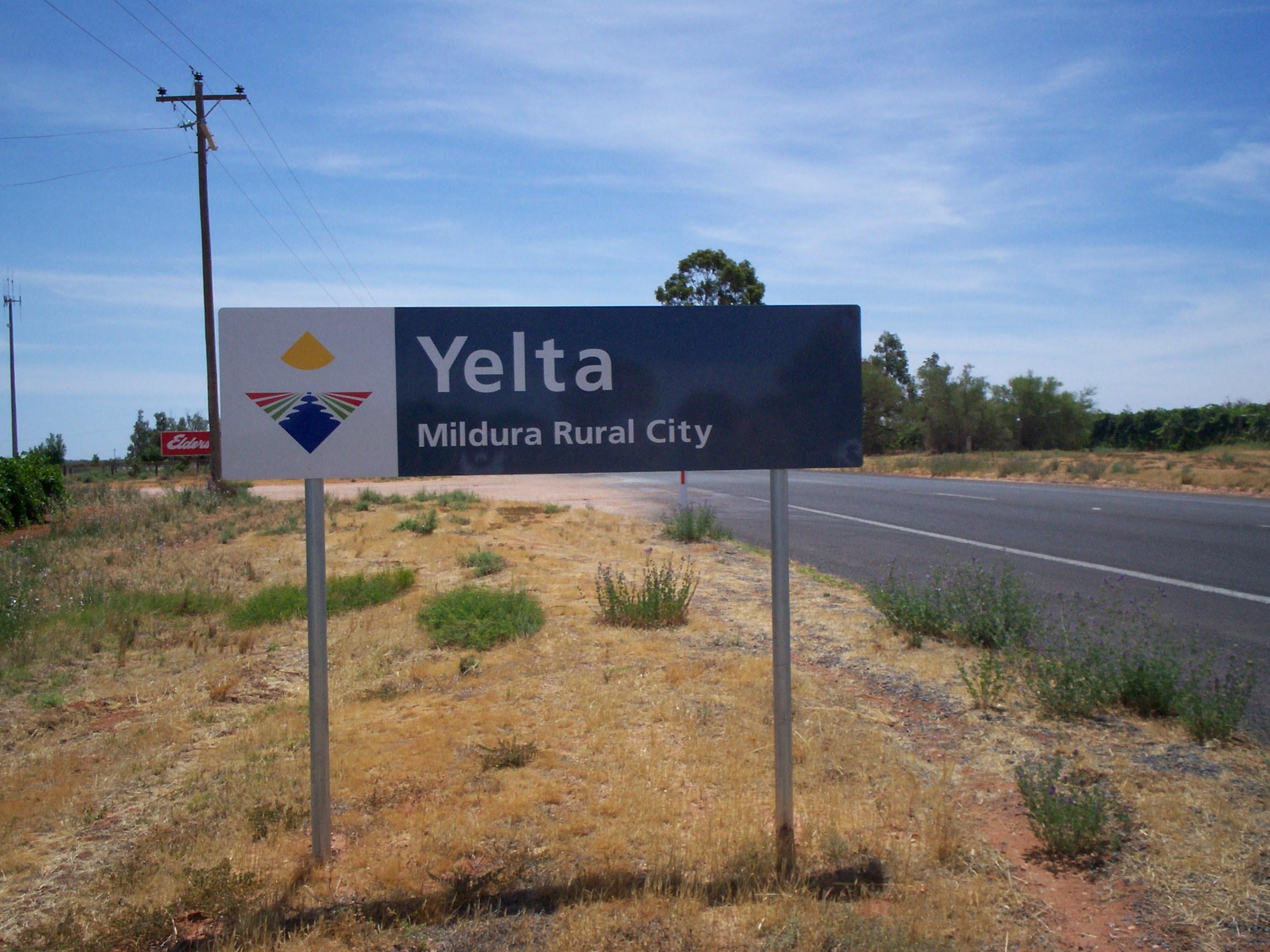
- Entry sign

- Coordinates: 34°07′S 141°59′E
- Country: Australia
- State: Victoria
- LGA: Rural City of Mildura
- Location: 563 km (350 mi) NW of Melbourne; 24 km (15 mi) W of Mildura; 9 km (5.6 mi) NW of Merbein; 3 km (1.9 mi) S of Curlwaa (NSW)

Government
  - State electorate: Mildura
  - Federal division: Mallee

Population
  - Total: 325 (2021 census)
- Postcode: 3505
Localities around Yelta
New South Wales	New South Wales	New South Wales
New South Wales	Yelta	New South Wales
Wargan	Merbein West	Merbein

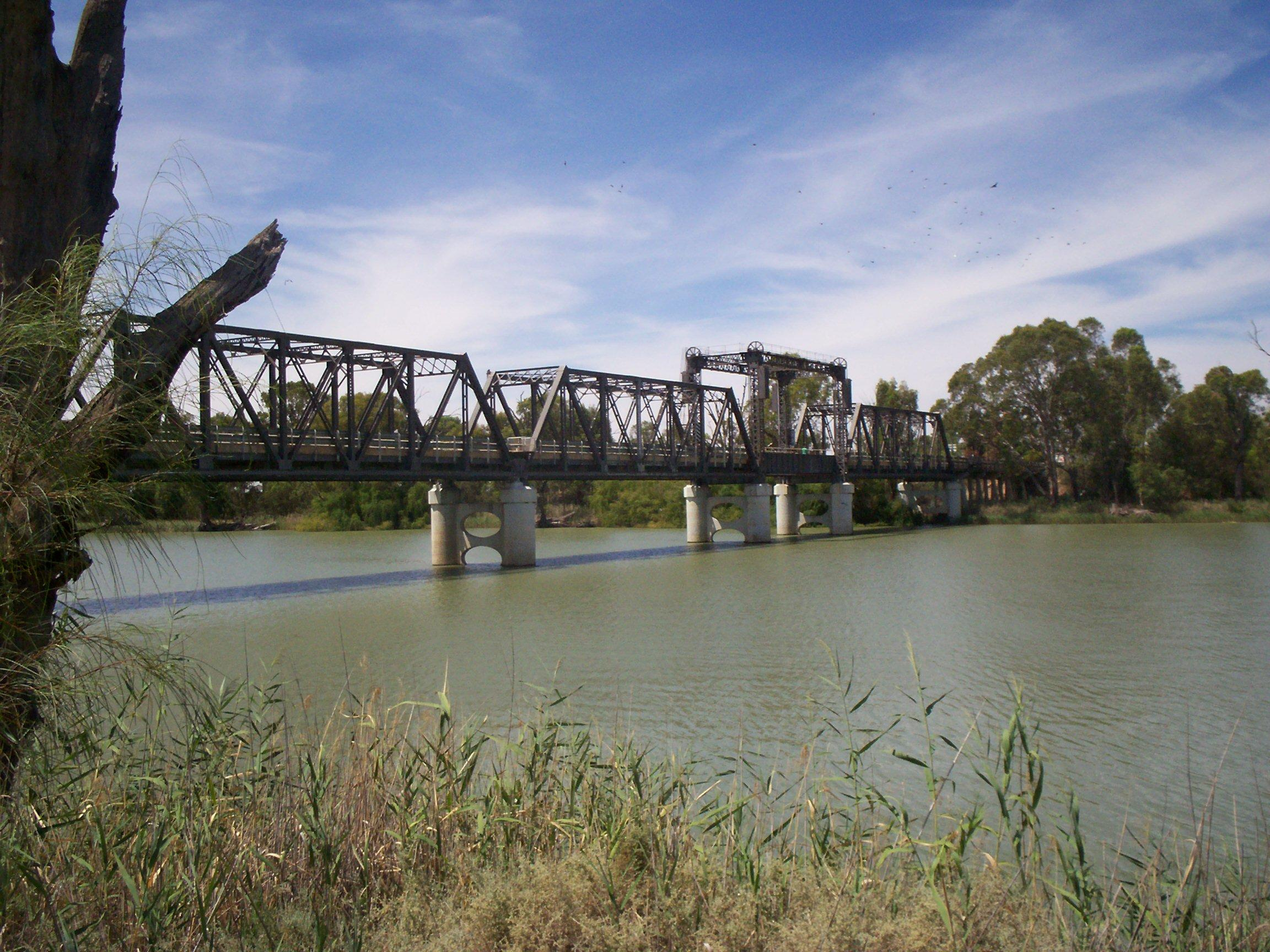
The Abbotsford Bridge

Yelta is a locality in Victoria, Australia. It was for a short time in the 1870s and 1880s the Victorian administrative centre of what is now Sunraysia and the Millewa. This role was then taken over by Mildura. At the 2011 census, Yelta and the surrounding area had a population of 281.

It is notable for containing the terminus of the Melbourne-Mildura railway line.

== History ==
Yelta Aboriginal Mission (1855–1868) was established by the Church of England on the banks of the Murray River Local aboriginal people called a small billabong near the site of the mission, Yelta.

== Military history ==
During World War II, Yelta was the location of RAAF No.29 Inland Aircraft Fuel Depot (IAFD), completed in 1942 and closed on 14 June 1944. Usually consisting of 4 tanks, 31 fuel depots were built across Australia for the storage and supply of aircraft fuel for the RAAF and the US Army Air Forces at a total cost of £900,000 ($1,800,000).
