= Tunart =

Coordinates: 34°28′07″S 141°14′31″E

- Town
- Country: Australia
- State: Victoria
- Region: Sunraysia
- LGA: Rural City of Mildura
- Location: 551 km (342 mi) from Melbourne; 114 km (71 mi) from Mildura; 15 km (9.3 mi) from Kurnwill; 10 km (6.2 mi) from Karween

Government
  - State electorate: Mildura
  - Federal division: Mallee
- Postcode: 3496

Tunart is a locality situated on the Tarrango-Tunart Road in the Sunraysia region. The place, by road, is situated about 10 kilometres south of Karween and 15 kilometres west of Kurnwill.
