= Bambill =

Coordinates: 34°24′20″S 141°30′07″E

Bambill Victoria
- Postcode(s): 3496
- Location: 529 km (329 mi) from Melbourne; 82 km (51 mi) from Mildura; 9 km (6 mi) from Werrimull; 6 km (4 mi) from Yarrara
- LGA(s): Rural City of Mildura
- Region: Sunraysia
- State electorate(s): Mildura
- Federal division(s): Mallee

Bambill is a locality situated on the Redcliffs-Meringur Road in the Sunraysia region. It is about 6 kilometres east from Yarrara and 9 kilometres west from Werrimull. The area was settled in the 1920s, the Post Office opening on 20 April 1926 (closing in 1959). The railway opened in 1925, and the station was closed in 1977.

Bambill has an Australian rules football team competing in the Millewa Football League, however the club now trains and plays in Mildura.
