= Millewa Football League =

Australian rules football league

- Current season, competition or edition: 2026
- Sport: Australian rules football
- Founded: 1926; 100 years ago
- No. of teams: 6
- Country: Australia
- Most recent champion: Bambill (2026)
- Most titles: Bambill (31)

The Millewa Football League is an Australian rules football league with teams based in north-western Victoria and south-western New South Wales, Australia.

The clubs are mostly based within the same area as the clubs in the Sunraysia Football League, but generally represent smaller towns and communities. Clubs only field one senior football team and up to five netball teams.

== History ==
The Millewa Football Association was reformed in 1925. At this time it had teams representing Lock 9, Lake Cullulleraine and Werrimull, and a team called "the Kangaroos". Lake Cullulleraine were the premiers that year. A fortnight after the grand final, a combined association team played the Mildura Football Club in a charity match.

In 1932, the now Millewa Football League contained teams from Bambill, Karawinna, Meringur, Merinee, Pirlta and Werrimull.

Due to World War II, the league went into recess between 1942 and 1945. Media coverage of this league was non-existent between 1940 and 1960. Regular scores did not start appearing in the press until the mid-1970s. Meringur went into recess prior to the 2012 season due to lack of players attributed to the population decline in the district, however returned in 2013. Euston merged with Robinvale of the Sunraysia Football League before the beginning of the 2015 to play in that competition.

=== The McDonald Medal ===
The McDonald Medal is an annual award presented to the best and fairest player in the Millewa Football League. Established in memory of Donald McDonald, a prominent figure in the league's history, the medal is awarded by his family.

Donald McDonald served as president of the Millewa Football League from 1946, following its reformation after World War II, until 1962. His contributions to the league were recognised by the Victorian Country Football League, which awarded him the Recognition of Service Medal.

After his death in 1962, his family initiated the presentation of the McDonald Medal in his honour. The inaugural medal was awarded in the same year and was shared by David Finn of Bambill and Bill Woods of Werrimull. Over the decades, many talented players have received this prestigious medal, highlighting their achievements within the Millewa League.

== Clubs ==
=== Locations ===
Locations of the Millewa FL clubs

=== Current ===
Club	Jumper	Nickname	Home Ground	Former League	Est.	Years in MFL	MFL Senior Premierships	
Club	Jumper	Nickname	Home Ground	Former League	Est.	Years in MFL	Total	Years
Bambill		Saints	Mildura Senior College, Mildura, Victoria	–	1920s	1927–	31	1935, 1938, 1939, 1949, 1965, 1966, 1967, 1968, 1970, 1971, 1976, 1980, 1985, 1986, 1987, 1988, 1996, 1998, 2000, 2002, 2007, 2009, 2011, 2014, 2015, 2016, 2019, 2022, 2023, 2024, 2026
Cardross		Lions	Cardross Recreational Reserve, Cardross, Victoria	SFNL	1948	1962–	3	1962, 1963, 1972
Gol Gol (Alcheringa 1980–98)		Hawks	Alcheringa Oval, Gol Gol, New South Wales	–	1980	1980–	11	1982, 1983, 1984, 1991, 1992, 1999, 2001, 2004, 2005, 2006, 2010
Meringur (Meringur-South Merbein 1988–95)		Kangaroos	Johansen Memorial Reserve, Cullulleraine, Victoria	–	1926	1926–36, 1949–2011, 2013–	9	1950, 1952, 1956, 1957, 1958, 1959, 1960, 1961, 1964
Nangiloc		Demons	Nangiloc Recreational Reserve, Nangiloc, Victoria	–	1975	1975–	8	1978, 1989, 1990, 1993, 1994, 1995, 2017, 2018
Werrimull		Magpies	Johansen Memorial Reserve, Cullulleraine, Victoria	–	1926	1926–	20	1926, 1927, 1928, 1929, 1930, 1947, 1948, 1951, 1954, 1955, 1973, 1974, 1975, 1977, 1979, 1981, 2003, 2012, 2013, 2025

=== Past Clubs ===
Club	Jumper	Nickname	Home Ground	Former League	Est.	Years in MFL	MFL Senior Premierships		Fate
Club	Jumper	Nickname	Home Ground	Former League	Est.	Years in MFL	Total	Years	Fate
Benetook				M&DJFL	1920s	1931	0	-	Returned to Mildura & District Junior FL after 1931 season
Coomealla		All-Blacks	George Gordon Oval, Dareton	SFNL	1920s	1981–1989	0	-	Merged With Wentworth District in the Sunraysia FL.
Euston		Bombers	Euston Recreation Reserve, Euston	MFL	1920s	1999–2014	1	2008	Merged with Robinvale following 2014 season to form Robinvale-Euston in Sunraysia FL
Karawinna				–	1920s	1926–1936	0	-	Folded
Karween				–	1920s	1932–1934	0	-	Merged with Morkalla in 1935 to form Morkalla-Karween
Karween-Karawinna		Tigers	Johansen Memorial Reserve, Cullulleraine, Victoria	–	1954	1954–1998	1	1997	Folded after 1998 season
Merinee				MPFA	1920s	1928–1949	9	1931, 1932, 1933, 1934, 1936, 1937, 1940, 1941, 1946	Folded
Morkalla-Karween				–	1935	1935–1953	1	1953	Merged with Karawinna in 1954 to form Karween-Karawinna
Nichols Point			Nichols Point Reserve, Nichols Point	–	1977	1977–1982	0	-	Folded
Pirlta				–	1920s	1929–1932	0	-	Folded
South Merbein		Swans	Merbein South Recreation Park, Merbein South	SFNL	1919	1960–1987	0	-	Merged with Meringur in 1988 to form Meringur-South Merbein
Yarrara	Light with dark band			–	1920s	1926–1937	0	-	Folded

== General statistics ==
General Information
Founded	1926
Records
Highest Score	382 — Gol Gol 59.28.382 (v Meringur 4.1.25) – 2022
Most premierships	30 – Bambill
Most goals in a game	33 - Adam Thomson (Gol Gol Vs Meringur) – 2022
Most goals in a season	149 – Rex Handy (Coomealla) – 1986
Most flags in a row	6 – Meringur – 1956–1961
Most wins in a row	50 – Nangiloc – 1993–1996
Most losses in a row	38 – Meringur – 2019–2023

== McDonald Medallists ==
Year	Player	Votes
1962	David Finn (Bambill) and Bill Woods (Werrimull)	
1963		
2007	Ben Casey (Bambill)	
2008	Anthony Albert (Gol Gol)	
2009	Denny Fox (Bambill) and Tim Robinson (Gol Gol)	
2010	Ben Ransome (Cardross)	
2011	Joseph Denaro (Euston)	
2012	Graeme Mentiplay (Werrimull) and Clinton Burdett (Gol Gol)	
2013		
2014	Clinton Burdett (Gol Gol)	
2015	Luke Stanbrook (Bambill)	
2016	Sam Curran (Gol Gol)	
2017	Mark Thomson (Werrimull)	
2018	Luke Coates (Bambill)	
2019	Jayden Kitt (Cardross) and Mark Thomson (Werrimull)	14
2020	MFNL in recess > COVID-19	
2021		
2022		
2023	Logan McKinnon	15
2024	Mark Thomson (Werrimull)	16
2025		
2026	Jason Hura (Bambill)	

== Leading Goal Kickers ==
Year	Player	H&A goals	Finals goals	Total Goals
1976	Ian Hobbs (Bambill) / Denis Coburn (Nangiloc)	60 / 60	5 / 5	65 / 65
1977	Les Hazel (Nangiloc)	75	10	85
1978	John Sheahan(Werrimull)	106	15	121
1979				
1980				
1981	Owen Evans (Werrimull)	73	5	78
1982	Don Cooke (Meringur)	100	11	111
1983	Rex Handy (Coomealla)	107	0	107
1984	Geoff Lucas (Alcheringa)	118	0	118
1985	Ron Jackson (Bambill)	139	9	148
1986	Rex Handy (Coomealla)	120	29	149
1987				
1988	Jerry Vuik (Bambill)	79	2	81
1989	Jerry Vuik (Bambill)	89	3	92
1990	Glenn Mitchell (Werrimull)	41		
1991	Frank Oldfield (Alcheringa)	123	0	123
1992	Frank Oldfield (Alcheringa)	108	0	108
1993	Grenville Dietrich (KK)	118	7	125
1994	Grenville Dietrich (KK)	123	0	123
1995	Grenville Dietrich (KK)	105	0	105
1996	Grenville Dietrich (KK)	112	3	115
1997	Brett Robertson (Bambill)	55	0	55
1998	Daryl Fisher (Cardross)	73	0	73
1999	David McDonnell (Gol Gol)	51	0	51
2000	Brett Haase (Euston)	103	5	108
2001	Matt Leeder (Werrimull)	105	1	106
2002	Mark Fitzgerald (Mer)	81	0	81
2003	Shane Ruyg (Werrimul)	83	11	94
2004	Bradley Brooks (GG)	90	16	106
2005	Bradley Brooks (GG)	85	2	87
2006	Mark Duscher (Werrimull)	76	0	76
2007	David Hall (Bambill)	71	7	78
2008	Mahino Paola(Euston)	71	0	71
2009	Kaleb Sherwell (Gol Gol)	81	7	88
2010	Brett Haase (Bambill)	92	0	92
2011	Jason Bell (Gol Gol)	83	19	102
2012	Robert Lindsey (Gol Gol)	117	16	133
2013	Luke Stanbrook (Bambill)	69	9	78
2014	Isaiah Johnson (Werrimull)	79	5	84
2015	Luke Stanbrook (Bambill)	67	6	73
2016	Luke Hubble (Bambill)	68	0	68
2017	David Keens (Nangiloc)	67	4	71
2018	David Hall (Bambill)	57	2	59

== Recent Grand Finals ==
- 1960 Meringur 11 13 79 Defeated Werrimull 4 6 30
- 1961 Meringur 8 15 63 Defeated Werrimull 8 4 52
- 1962 Cardross 11 12 78 Defeated Meringur 11 9 75
- 1963 Cardross 10 10 70 Defeated Meringur 10 9 69
- 1964 Meringur 13 21 99 Defeated Bambill 13 3 81
- 1965 Bambill 8 10 58 Defeated Meringur 5 10 40
- 1966 Bambill 14 13 97 Defeated Cardross 14 4 88
- 1967 Bambill 9 13 67 Defeated Meringur 5 15 45
- 1968 Bambill 12 10 82 Defeated Werrimull 7 10 52
- 1969 South Merbein 11 11 77 Defeated Karween-Karawinna 6 11 47
- 1970 Bambill 13 8 86 Defeated Cardross 8 12 60
- 1971 Bambill 14 15 99 Defeated Karween-Karawinna 11 12 78
- 1972 Cardross 17 14 116 Defeated Werrimull 12 18 90
- 1973 Werrimull 9 11 65 Defeated Bambill 7 6 48
- 1974 Werrimull 17 18 120 Defeated South Merbein 17 11 113
- 1975 Werrimull 15 18 108 Defeated Bambill 14 10 94
- 1976 Bambill 14 12 96 Defeated Nangiloc 4 17 41
- 1977 Werrimull 15 15 105 Defeated Nangiloc 13 13 91
- 1978 Nangiloc 19 10 124 Defeated Meringur 18 9 117
- 1979 Werrimull 16 22 118 Defeated Bambill 16 18 114
- 1980 Bambill 15 12 102 Defeated Werrimull 11 11 77
- 1981 Werrimull 19 12 126 Defeated Alcheringa 12 11 83
- 1982 Alcheringa 31 21 207 Defeated Cardross 14 8 92
- 1983 Alcheringa 27 10 172 Defeated Bambill 14 10 94
- 1984 Alcheringa 18 17 125 Defeated Bambill 15 10 100
- 1985 Bambill 15 11 101 Defeated Alcheringa 11 9 75
- 1986 Bambill 15 8 98 Defeated Alcheringa 13 10 88
- 1987 Bambill 26 14 170 Defeated Alcheringa 15 8 98
- 1988 Bambill 7 18 60 Defeated Meringur South Merbein 3 9 27
- 1989 Nangiloc 17 18 120 Defeated Alcheringa 13 12 90
- 1990 Nangiloc 15 15 105 Defeated Alcheringa 10 13 73
- 1991 Alcheringa 16 11 107 Defeated Bambill 9 8 62
- 1992 Alcheringa 12 7 79 Defeated Bambill 7 13 55
- 1993 Nangiloc 13 8 86 Defeated Bambill 8 17 65
- 1994 Nangiloc 14 16 100 Defeated Bambill 12 8 80
- 1995 Nangiloc 15 16 106 Defeated Bambill 10 10 70
- 1996 Bambill 15 19 109 Defeated Nangiloc 11 11 77
- 1997 Karween-Karawinna 16 10 106 Defeated Bambill 14 12 96
- 1998 Bambill 20 12 132 Defeated Werrimull 6 9 45
- 1999 Gol Gol 17 15 117 Defeated Nangiloc 13 14 92
- 2000 Bambill 18 19 127 Defeated Gol Gol 11 10 76
- 2001 Gol Gol 19 16 130 Defeated Werrimull 5 8 38
- 2002 Bambill 24 11 155 Defeated Euston 5 10 40
- 2003 Werrimull 19 12 126 Defeated Gol Gol 18 17 125
- 2004 Gol Gol 12 12 84 Defeated Bambill 6 10 46
- 2005 Gol Gol 20 15 135 Defeated Meringur 4 8 32
- 2006 Gol Gol 22 18 150 Defeated Cardross 1 12 18
- 2007 Bambill 19 13 127 Defeated Cardross 4 9 33
- 2008 Euston 13 10 88 Defeated Gol Gol 6 12 48
- 2009 Bambill 13 14 92 Defeated Gol Gol 11 5 71
- 2010 Gol Gol 14 15 89 Defeated Bambill 5 18 48
- 2011 Bambill 24 14 158 Defeated Werrimull 14 5 89
- 2012 Werrimull 20 23 143 Defeated Gol Gol 4 5 29
- 2013 Werrimull 18 16 124 Defeated Bambill 13 8 86
- 2014 Bambill 19 21 135 Defeated 9 8 62
- 2015 Bambill 16 14 110 Defeated Werrimull 8 13 61
- 2016 Bambill 11 9 75 Defeated Gol Gol 6 9 45
- 2017 Nangiloc 9 10 64 Defeated Gol Gol 7 13 55
- 2018 Nangiloc 11 6 72 Defeated Werrimull 8 9 57
- 2019 Bambill 10 13 73 Defeated Nangiloc 10 10 70
- 2020 Season cancelled due to COVID-19 pandemic
- 2021 Finals cancelled due to COVID-19 pandemic
- 2022 Bambill 16 17 113 Defeated Cardross 7 8 50
- 2023 Bambill 12 12 84 Defeated Gol Gol 11 5 71
- 2024 Bambill 15.14 104 Defeated Cardross 7.7 49
- 2025 Werrimull 11.6 72 Defeated Bambill 6.8 44
- 2026 Bambill 15.13 103 Defeated Cardross 14.6 90

== Premierships ==
- 1926 Werrimull
- 1927 Werrimull
- 1928 Werrimull
- 1929 Werrimull
- 1930 Werrimull
- 1931 Merinee
- 1932 Merinee
- 1933 Merinee
- 1934 Merinee
- 1935 Bambill
- 1936 Merinee
- 1937 Merinee
- 1938 Bambill
- 1939 Bambill
- 1940 Merinee
- 1941 Merinee
- 1942 No competition due to WWII
- 1943 No competition due to WWII
- 1944 No competition due to WWII
- 1945 No competition due to WWII
- 1946 Merinee
- 1947 Werrimull
- 1948 Werrimull
- 1949 Bambill
- 1950 Meringur
- 1951 Werrimull
- 1952 Meringur
- 1953 Karween
- 1954 Werrimull
- 1955 Werrimull
- 1956 Meringur
- 1957 Meringur
- 1958 Meringur
- 1959 Meringur
- 1960 Meringur
- 1961 Meringur
- 1962 Cardross
- 1963 Cardross
- 1964 Meringur
- 1965 Bambill
- 1966 Bambill
- 1967 Bambill
- 1968 Bambill
- 1969 South Merbein
- 1970 Bambill
- 1971 Bambill
- 1972 Cardross
- 1973 Werrimull
- 1974 Werrimull
- 1975 Werrimull
- 1976 Bambill
- 1977 Werrimull
- 1978 Nangiloc
- 1979 Werrimull
- 1980 Bambill
- 1981 Werrimull
- 1982 Alcheringa
- 1983 Alcheringa
- 1984 Alcheringa
- 1985 Bambill
- 1986 Bambill
- 1987 Bambill
- 1988 Bambill
- 1989 Nangiloc
- 1990 Nangiloc
- 1991 Alcheringa
- 1992 Alcheringa
- 1993 Nangiloc
- 1994 Nangiloc
- 1995 Nangiloc
- 1996 Bambill
- 1997 Karween Karawinna
- 1998 Bambill
- 1999 Gol Gol
- 2000 Bambill
- 2001 Gol Gol
- 2002 Bambill
- 2003 Werrimull
- 2004 Gol Gol
- 2005 Gol Gol
- 2006 Gol Gol
- 2007 Bambill
- 2008 Euston
- 2009 Bambill
- 2010 Gol Gol
- 2011 Bambill
- 2012 Werrimull
- 2013 Werrimull
- 2014 Bambill
- 2015 Bambill
- 2016 Bambill
- 2017 Nangiloc
- 2018 Nangiloc
- 2019 Bambill
- 2020 In recess > COVID-19
- 2021 No finals > COVID-19
- 2022 Bambill
- 2023 Bambill
- 2024 Bambill
- 2025 Werrimull
- 2026 Bambill

== 2022 Ladder ==
Millewa	Wins	Byes	Losses	Draws	For	Against	%	Pts	Final	Team	G	B	Pts	Team	G	B	Pts
Bambill	15	0	0	0	2901	447	648.99%	60	1st Semi	Gol Gol	27	20	182	Nangolic	10	7	67
Cardross	11	0	4	0	1704	1247	136.65%	44	2nd Semi	Bambill	23	17	155	Cardross	5	4	34
Gol Gol	10	0	5	0	2030	875	232.00%	40	Preliminary	Cardross	11	10	76	Gol Gol	10	15	75
Nangolic	6	0	9	0	1504	1575	95.49%	24	Grand	Bambill	16	17	113	Cardross	7	8	50
Werrimull	3	0	12	0	1199	1939	61.84%	12									
Meringur	0	0	15	0	137	3392	4.04%	0									

== 2023 Ladder ==
Millewa	Wins	Byes	Losses	Draws	For	Against	%	Pts	Final	Team	G	B	Pts	Team	G	B	Pts
Bambill	13	0	2	0	1997	631	316.48%	52	1st Semi	Cardross	8	15	63	Nangolic	10	10	70
Gol Gol	11	0	4	0	2028	761	266.49%	44	2nd Semi	Bambill	11	10	76	Gol Gol	7	9	51
Cardross	11	0	4	0	1882	852	220.89%	44	Preliminary	Gol Gol	11	9	75	Nangolic	7	10	52
Nangolic	7	0	8	0	1277	1061	120.36%	28	Grand	Bambill	12	12	84	Gol Gol	11	5	71
Werrimull	2	0	13	0	709	2223	31.89%	8									
Meringur	1	0	14	0	492	2857	17.22%	4									

== 2024 Ladder ==
Millewa	Wins	Byes	Losses	Draws	For	Against	%	Pts	Final	Team	G	B	Pts	Team	G	B	Pts
Bambill	14	0	1	0	1979	543	364.46%	56	1st Semi	Nangolic	11	12	78	Gol Gol	10	11	71
Cardross	11	0	4	0	1518	853	177.96%	44	2nd Semi	Bambill	17	14	116	Cardross	6	4	40
Nangolic	9	0	6	0	1284	1057	121.48%	36	Preliminary	Cardross	13	13	91	Nangolic	11	5	71
Gol Gol	7	0	8	0	1617	963	167.91%	28	Grand	Bambill	15	14	104	Cardross	7	7	49
Werrimull	4	0	11	0	1012	1366	74.08%	16									
Meringur	0	0	15	0	329	2957	11.13%	0									

== 2026 Finals ==
Millewa	Wins	Losses	Draws	Final	Team	G	B	Pts	Team	G	B	Pts
Bambill	13	2	0	1st Semi	Meringur	11	7	73	Gol Gol	9	14	68
Cardross	11	4	0	2nd Semi	Bambill	11	5	71	Cardross	6	13	49
Meringur	8	7	0	Preliminary	Cardross	13	13	91	Meringur	9	9	63
Gol Gol	8	7	0	Grand	Bambill				Cardross			
Werrimull	5	10	0									
Nangiloc	0	15	0									
