= Red Cliffs railway station =

Former railway station in Victoria, Australia

Red Cliffs
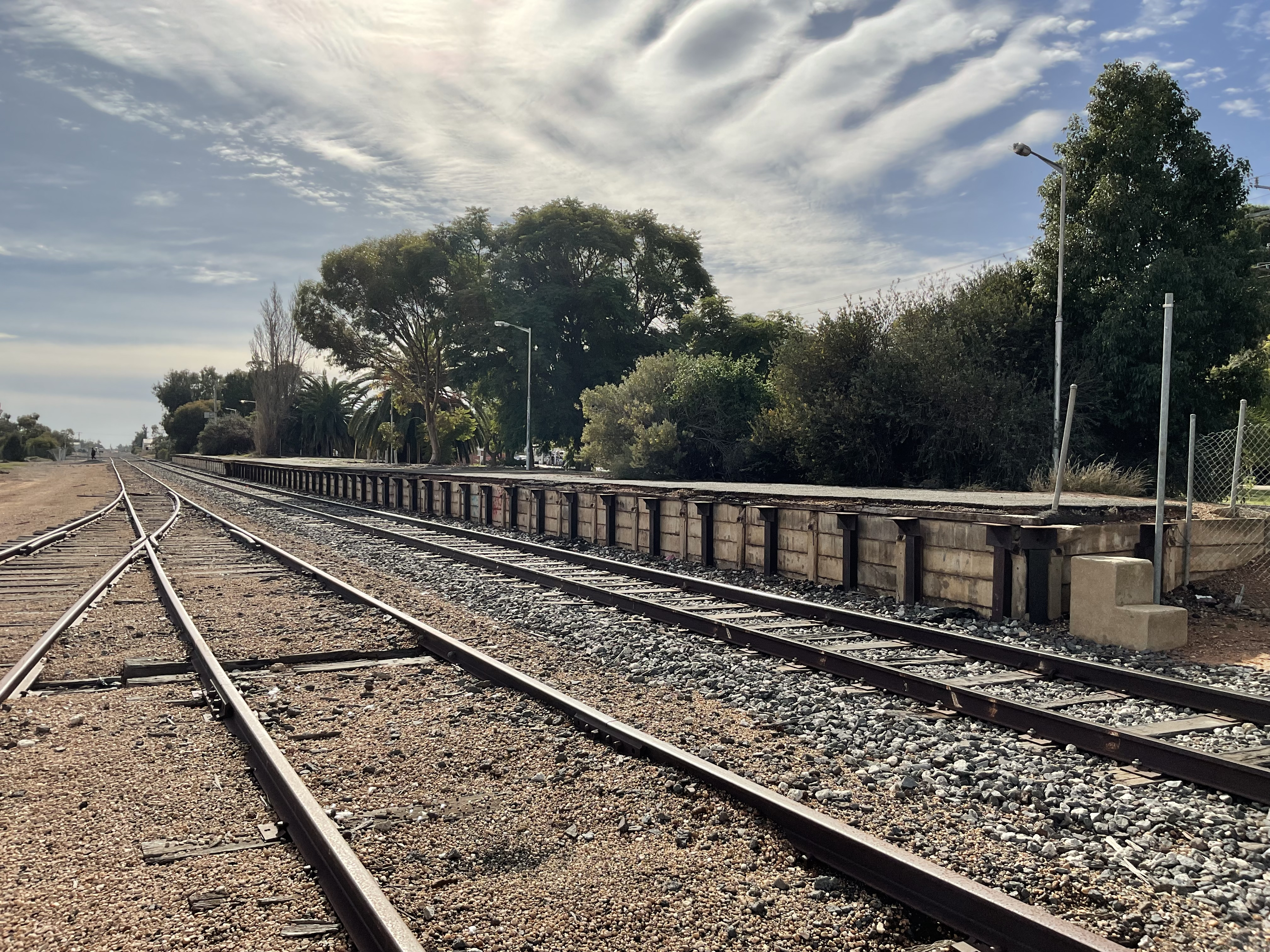
- Northbound view of the station in June 2023

General information
- Coordinates: 34°18′28″S 142°11′10″E
- Line: Mildura
- Platforms: 1
- Tracks: 1

Other information
- Status: Closed

History
- Opened: 1920
- Closed: 12 September 1993

Services
Preceding station	Disused railways	Following station
Ouyen	Mildura line	Irymple
Junction	Morkalla line	West to Morkalla
	List of closed railway stations in Victoria	
Location
- Location within Victoria

Red Cliffs is a closed railway station in the town of Red Cliffs, on the Mildura line, in Victoria, Australia. It was established as a passenger station in 1920, with a loop siding being provided around this time. In 1922, a railmotor service commenced between Mildura and Red Cliffs, and a railmotor turntable was provided. The service ended in 1928. In April 1924, the Red Cliffs – Werrimull branch line opened, heading west, and was later extended to Meringur and Morkalla.

By 1938, the station had a four-road yard with a goods shed, and private sidings serving a fruit co-op and the State Rivers and Water Supply Commission of Victoria. A new platform and station building were also provided, on the Melbourne side of the previous one.

In 1975, flashing light signals were provided at the Fitzroy Avenue level crossing, located nearby in the down direction of the station. In 1988, the branch line to Meringur was closed. A number of track alterations took place in 1991, and two years later, the interlocking was abolished, and the station became a plain siding.

In early 1994, the station was leased to the Shire of Mildura for a period of 10 years.

On the 19th of October 2026, the Victorian Liberals and Nationals committed to restoring V/Line passenger rail service to Red Cliffs by 2029 if they won the November 2026 Victorian election.

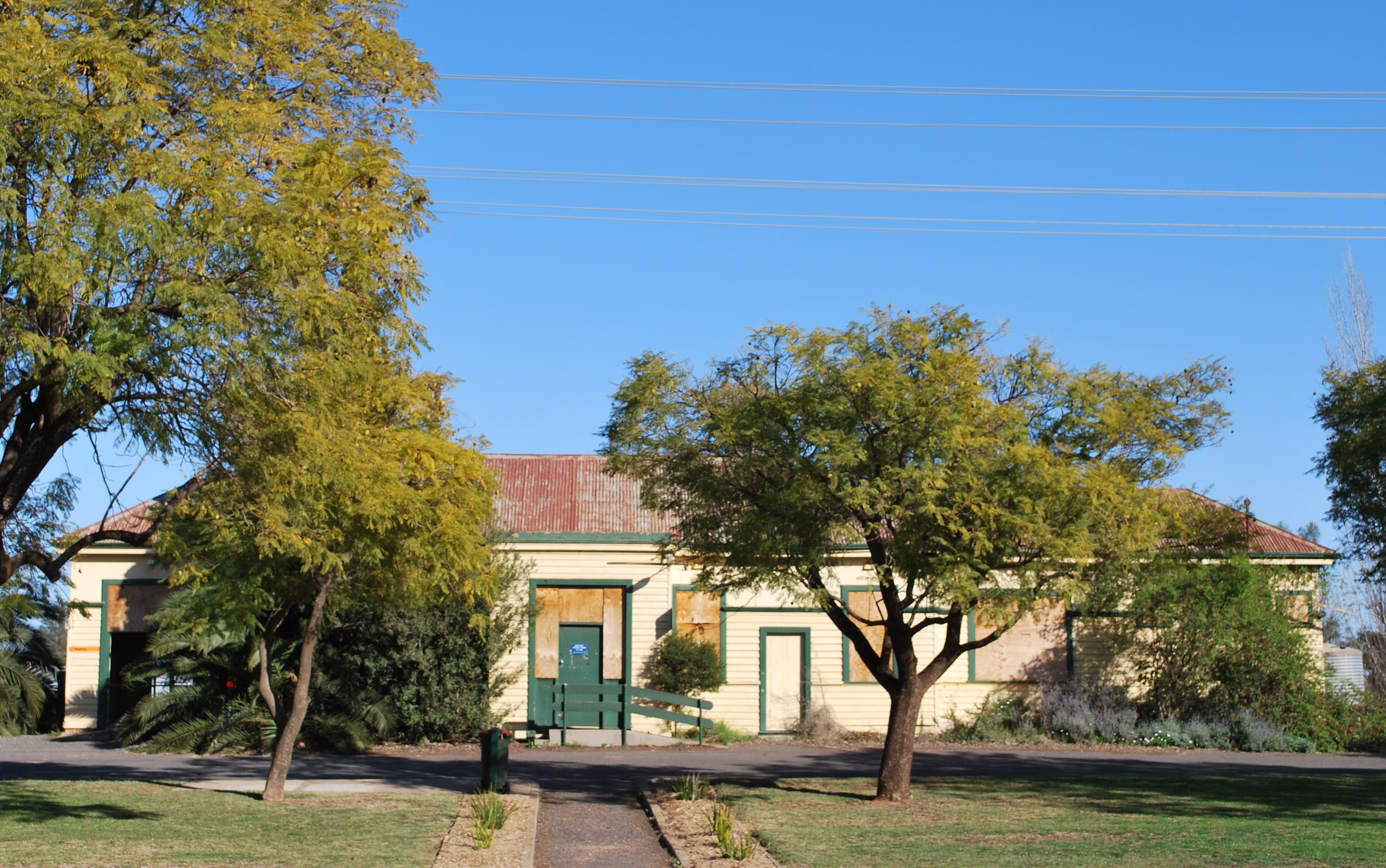
Red Cliffs station building in 2009, now demolished

== Demolition of station building ==
In 2011, VicTrack was given permission to demolish the station building, despite local protests. That was completed in April of that year, with the passenger platform being retained.
