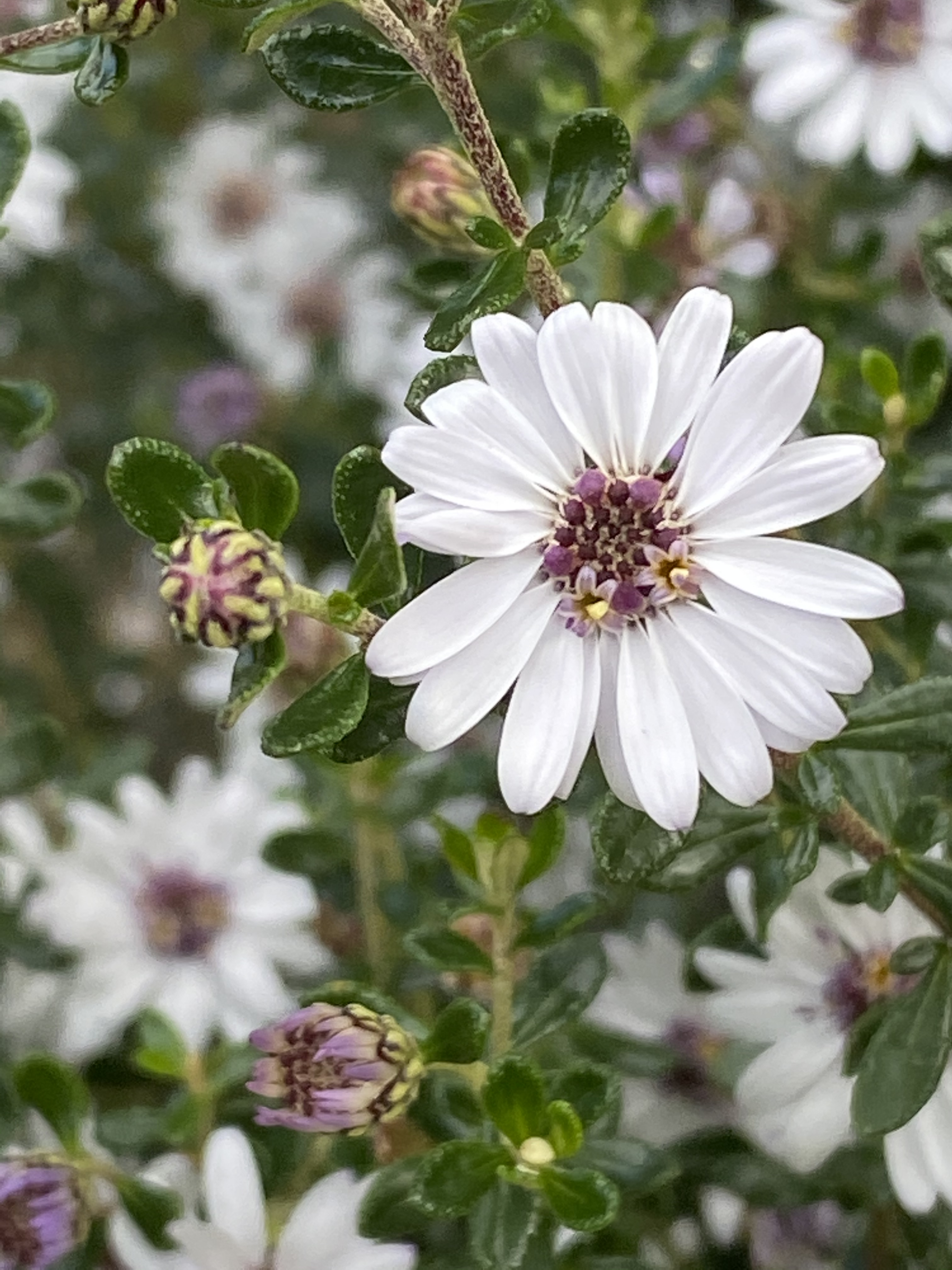

Scientific classification
- Kingdom: Plantae
- Clade: Embryophytes
- Clade: Tracheophytes
- Clade: Angiosperms
- Clade: Eudicots
- Clade: Asterids
- Order: Asterales
- Family: Asteraceae
- Genus: Olearia
- Species: O. minor

Binomial name
- Olearia minor (Benth.) Lander

Synonyms
- Olearia pimeleoides var. minor Benth.

= Olearia minor =

Species of flowering plant

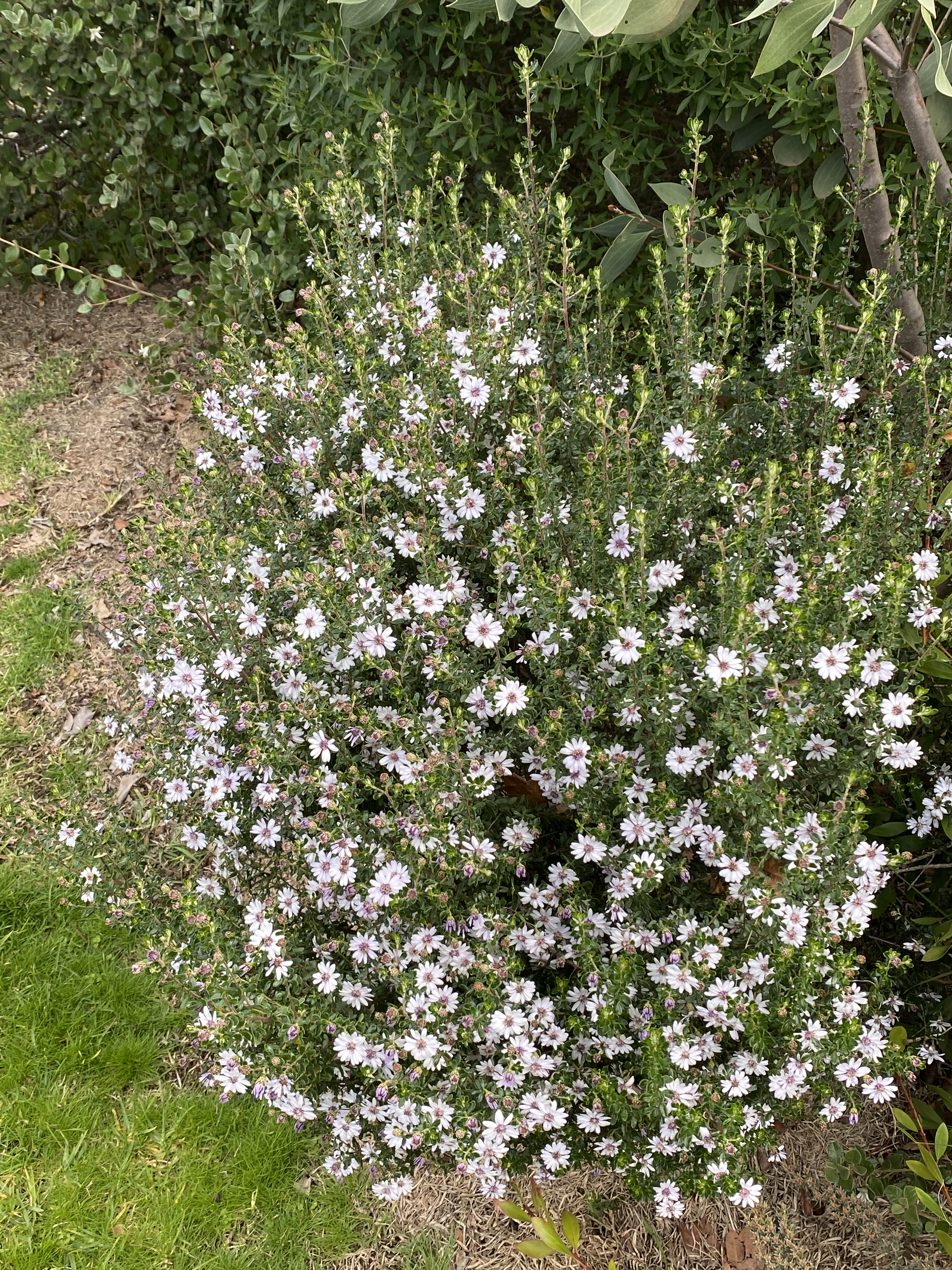
Olearia minor habit

Olearia minor, is a small flowering shrub in the family Asteraceae. It has alternate leaves and white to pale mauve daisy-like flowers from winter to December. It grows in Western Australia, South Australia, New South Wales, and Victoria.

== Description ==
Olearia minor is a small shrub to 1.5 m (4 ft 11 in) high, branchlets and leaf underside thickly covered with whitish, cottony hairs. The leaves are elliptic or egg-shaped, 1.5–8 mm (0.059–0.315 in) long, 1–2.5 mm (0.039–0.098 in) wide, arranged alternately, rounded or broadly pointed, green upper surface, occasional cobweb appearance when young, smooth or rough with short hairs. The single flowers are densely clustered, 12–22 mm (0.47–0.87 in) in diameter and borne at the end of branches, attached either with or without a stalk. The 7-12 white to pale mauve ligules (petals) 5.5–11 mm (0.22–0.43 in) long and the flower disc yellow or mauve. The 4-5 bracts are conical shaped, 4–6 mm (0.16–0.24 in) long, arranged in rows, smooth near the base, densely or sparingly covered with short, soft hairs near the either rounded or pointed apex. The dry, one-seeded fruit are narrowly oval shaped, about 1–2 mm (0.039–0.079 in) long, slightly ribbed, smooth or with dense, silky, flattened hairs. Flowering occurs from June to December.

== Taxonomy ==
This daisy was first formally described in 1867 by George Bentham who gave it the name Olearia pimeleoides var. minor in Flora Australiensis. In 1991, Nicholas Lander raised the variety to species status as Olearia minor and the change was published in the journal Telopea.

== Distribution and habitat ==
This species grows in mallee or open scrubland on loam or yellow brown sand or rocky slopes mostly around Balranald district, Dubbo and the Budawang Range in New South Wales. In Victoria a scattered distribution on loamy soils with mallee in the north-west near Bambill to near the Little Desert and dry forest in the northern Brisbane Ranges and Werribbee Gorge. In South Australia, this daisy-bush is widely distributed in the south of the state, including on Kangaroo Island. In Western Australia it grows in sandstone, limestone, sand dunes or rocky slopes amongst mallee or scrubland near Coolgardie, Esperance and the wheatbelt.
