= Karawinna, Victoria =

Coordinates: 34°22′39″S 141°41′51″E

Karawinna Victoria
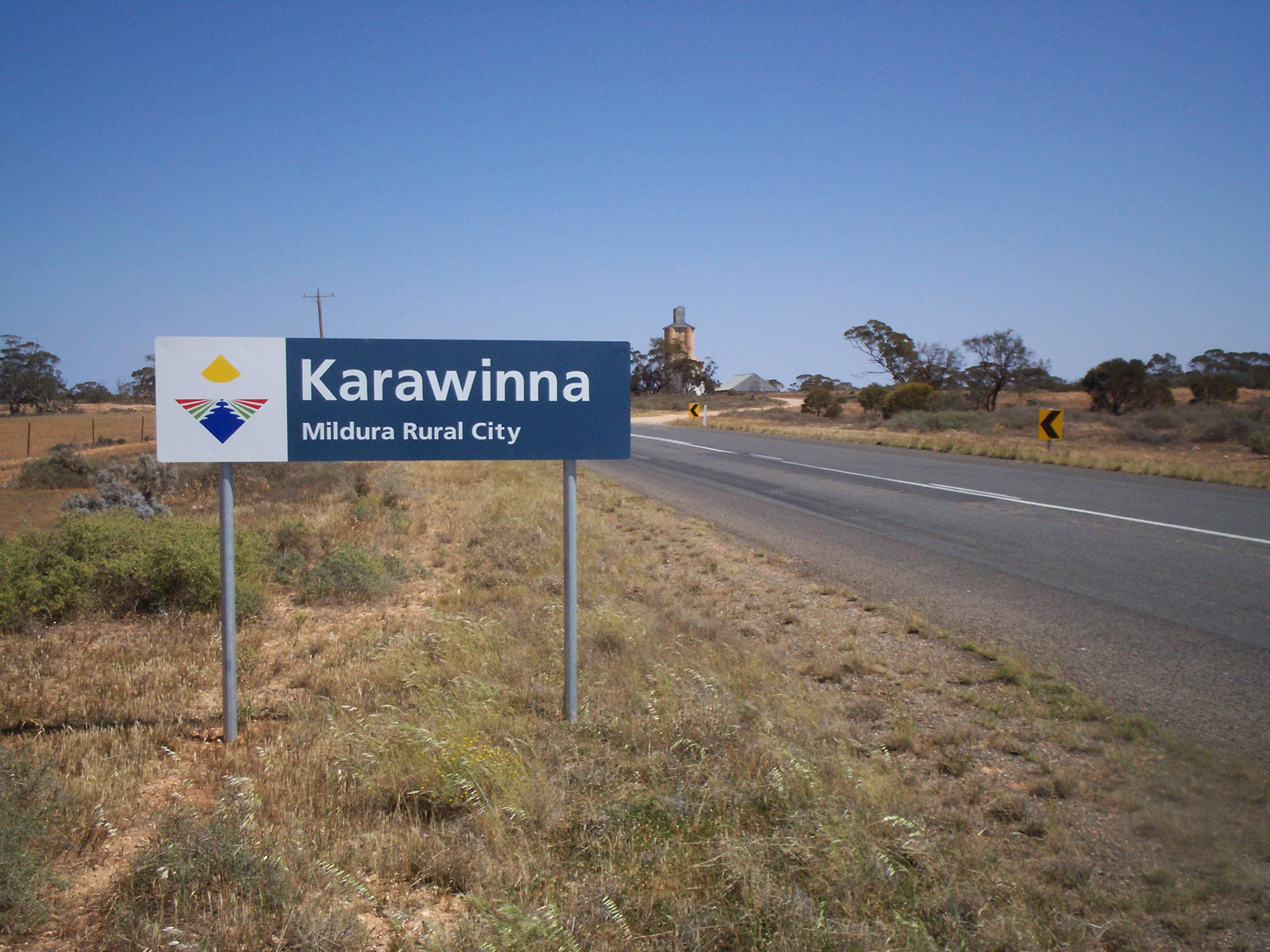
- Karawinna
- Postcode(s): 3496
- Location: 571 km (355 mi) from Melbourne; 69 km (43 mi) from Mildura; 11 km (7 mi) from Merrinee; 10 km (6 mi) from Werrimull
- LGA(s): Rural City of Mildura
- Region: Sunraysia
- State electorate(s): Mildura
- Federal division(s): Mallee

Karawinna is a locality situated in the Sunraysia region. The place by road, is situated about 11 kilometres west from Merrinee and 10 kilometres east from Werrimull. It was served by the Morkalla railway line from 1924 until it closed.

== Karawinna North ==
Situated on the Sturt Highway, north of Karawinna. Consisted of basic residency and a post office, which was serviced by the council of Karrawinna. Local children attended Walpolla state school situated on the Sturt Highway. The main local industry consisted of wheat and sheep farming.
