= Birdwoodton =

- Town
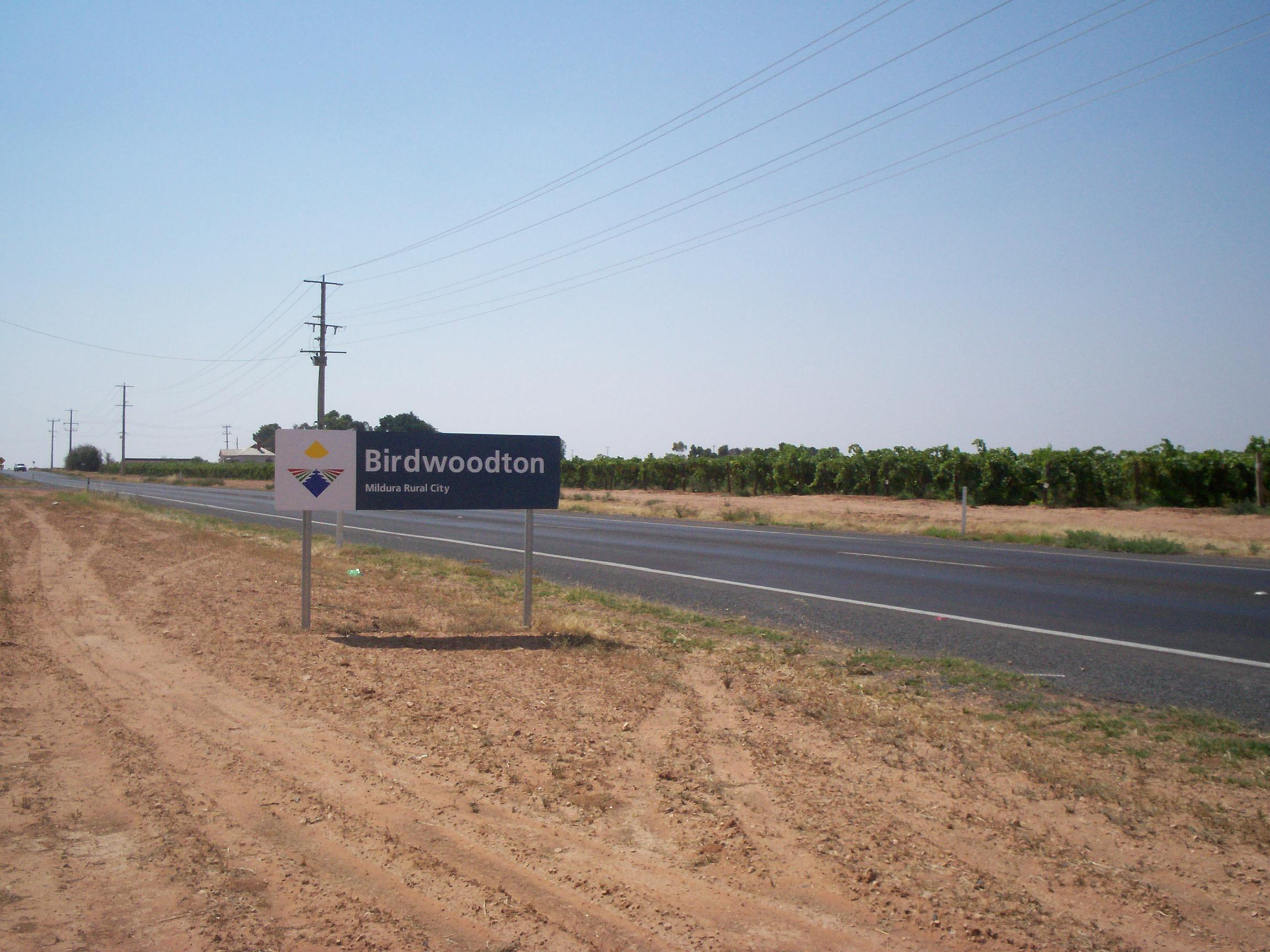
- Entering Birdwoodton

- Coordinates: 34°11′47″S 142°03′31″E
- Country: Australia
- State: Victoria
- Region: Sunraysia
- LGA: Rural City of Mildura
- Location: 548 km (341 mi) from Melbourne; 14 km (8.7 mi) from Mildura; 15 km (9.3 mi) from Irymple; 4 km (2.5 mi) from Merbein

Government
  - State electorate: Mildura
  - Federal division: Mallee

Population
  - Total: 748 (2021 census)
- Time zone: UTC+10 (AEST)
  - Summer (DST): UTC+11 (AEST)
- Postcode: 3505
Localities around Birdwoodton
Merbein	Merbein	New South Wales
Merbein South	Birdwoodton	Cabarita
Merbein South	Koorlong	Mildura

Birwoodton is a locality situated in the Sunraysia region, in north western Victoria, Australia. The place by road, is situated about 4 kilometres south of Merbein and 14 kilometres northwest of Mildura.

Named after William Birdwood, 1st Baron Birdwood, leader of the ANZAC forces at the Battle of Gallipoli, it was established as an agricultural soldier settler scheme soon after World War I. The Post Office opened on 19 July 1920 (closed in 1978).

The locality is predominantly devoted to grape production.

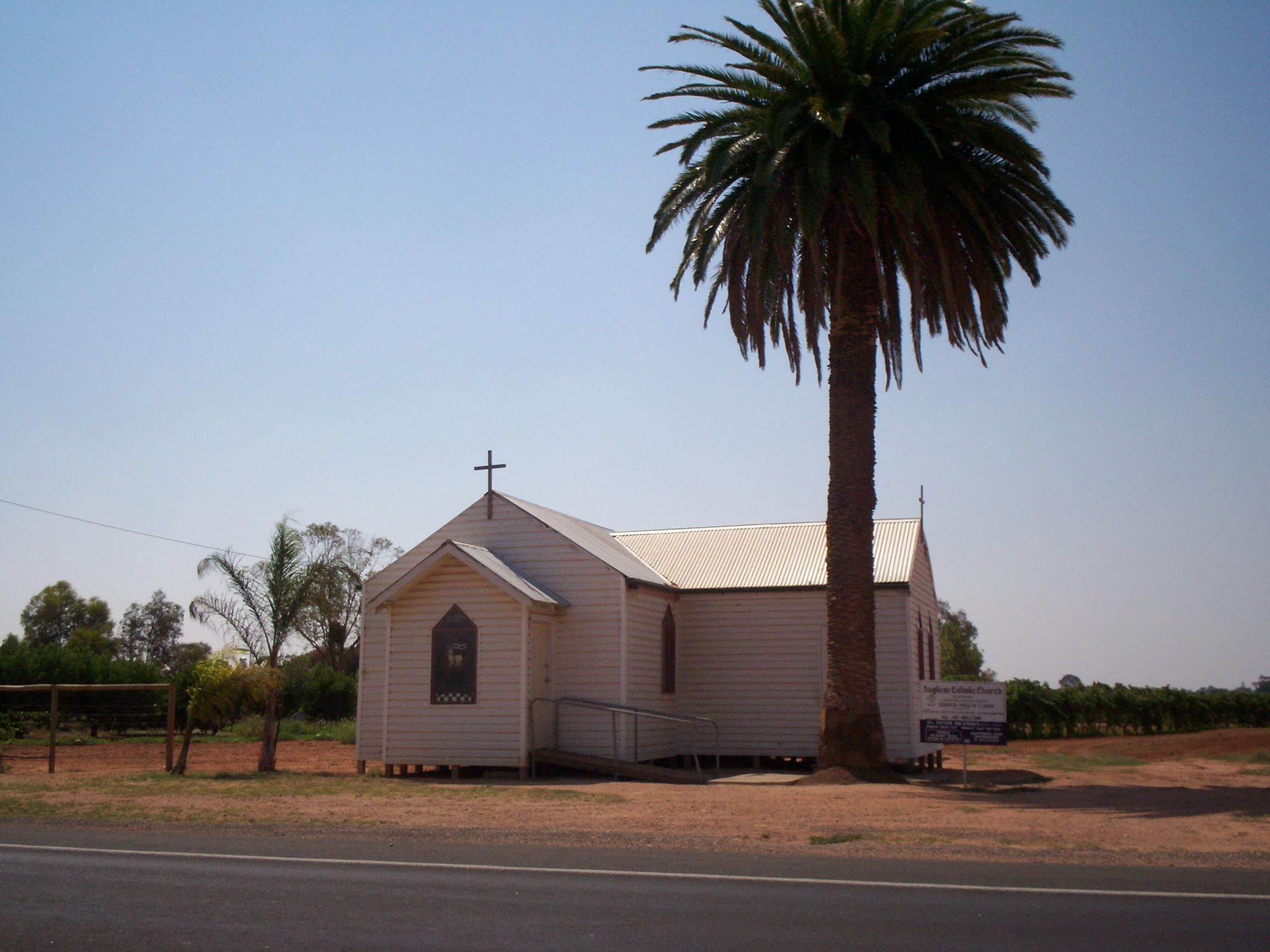
The Anglican Catholic church in Birdwoodton
