= Morkalla =

Morkalla Victoria
- Coordinates: 34°22′16″S 141°10′8″E
- Postcode(s): 3496
- Location: 560 km (348 mi) from Melbourne; 113 km (70 mi) from Mildura; 31 km (19 mi) from Yamba; 9 km (6 mi) from Karween
- LGA(s): Rural City of Mildura
- Region: Sunraysia
- State electorate(s): Mildura
- Federal division(s): Mallee
Localities around Morkalla:
	Murray-Sunset	Neds Corner
Murray-Sunset	Morkalla	Karween
	Murray-Sunset

Morkalla is a locality in the Sunraysia region of Victoria, situated at the farthest west point on the Redcliffs-Meringur Road. It is about 31 km south-east of Yamba in South Australia and 9 km west of Karween, and is 11 km due south of the Sturt Highway.

After World War I, the area was opened up to soldier settlers. To support them, the railway was extended to Morkalla in 1931. Passenger facilities at Morkalla were removed in 1939, and the line was closed in 1964, having only been used on a seasonal basis for a number of years, to transport the wheat harvest.
