= Jacinta Duncan =

Australian science educator

- Born: Millewa, Victoria, Australia
- Education: Master of Education by Research
- Occupation: Director
- Scientific career
- Fields: Science education
- Workplaces: Gene Technology Access Centre

Jacinta Duncan is an Australian science educator who grew up on marginal farming land in the Millewa area in the top North West of Victoria. Working alongside her father, Duncan learned animal husbandry, and how to crop wheat and barley while her mother, a primary school teacher, taught her music, French and took her to learn ballet. Duncan says "the importance of an inquisitive mind and a robust education has always been at the forefront of my life".

== Education and career ==
Completing a Bachelor of Biological Sciences at the La Trobe University, Duncan majored in Biochemistry and Botany. Her Honours year research focussed on a natural defence mechanism in plants, the production of phytoalexins to halt the growth of invasive fungi.

Her career in science began with a position as a molecular biologist in the population genetics laboratories of the inspirational Professor Ary Hoffman. She investigated the natural spread of a bacterial infection in fruit fly. This Wolbachia infection is transmitted through the female line. When infected males mate with uninfected females the progeny do not survive. In this way, the infection spreads quickly. Recently scientists have managed to use Wolbachia bacteria to control outbreaks of dengue fever. Mosquitoes are a vector for the virus that causes dengue. Scientists have manipulated Wolbachia so it blocks the growth of virus inside the mosquito. As a result, transmission of the disease is stopped. Releasing these infected mosquitoes has resulted in the wild mosquito population becoming infected, lowering the incidence of dengue fever.

Duncan then transitioned to a research role in the Department of Agriculture where her project focussed on the biological control of red legged earth mites. While holidaying overseas, Duncan made a life-turning decision to return to Australia and complete a Diploma of Education at the University of Melbourne. She says "Nothing can describe that moment when you realise you have found your life calling."

== Recent career ==
After seven years teaching biology, chemistry, science and mathematics in a variety of secondary schools, including three years teaching in a local school in Indonesia, Duncan joined the Gene Technology Access Centre as an Education Officer, designing and delivering programs that showcase contemporary life sciences. During this time, she wrote chapters for the Nelson VCE Biology text book. She also introduced learning resources that enable Victorian students to access the bioinformatics tools and databases used by scientists in their research.

Since 2012, Duncan has been the Director of the Gene Technology Access Centre, a specialist Science and Mathematics Centre, funded by the Victorian Government Department of Education and Early Childhood Development. The centre offers a suite of programs that immerse students in the study of contemporary life sciences. Students investigate cells, immunology, disease, medicine, agriculture, evolution and forensic science and become aware of the cutting-edge research emerging from Victoria's research institutes, such as the Walter and Eliza Hall Institute.

The mission of GTAC is to provide engaging experiences for students and help teachers keep their curriculum contemporary. Duncan says "We hope to engage the next generation of scientists and promote a society that will participate in informed debate."
