= Merrinee =

- Town
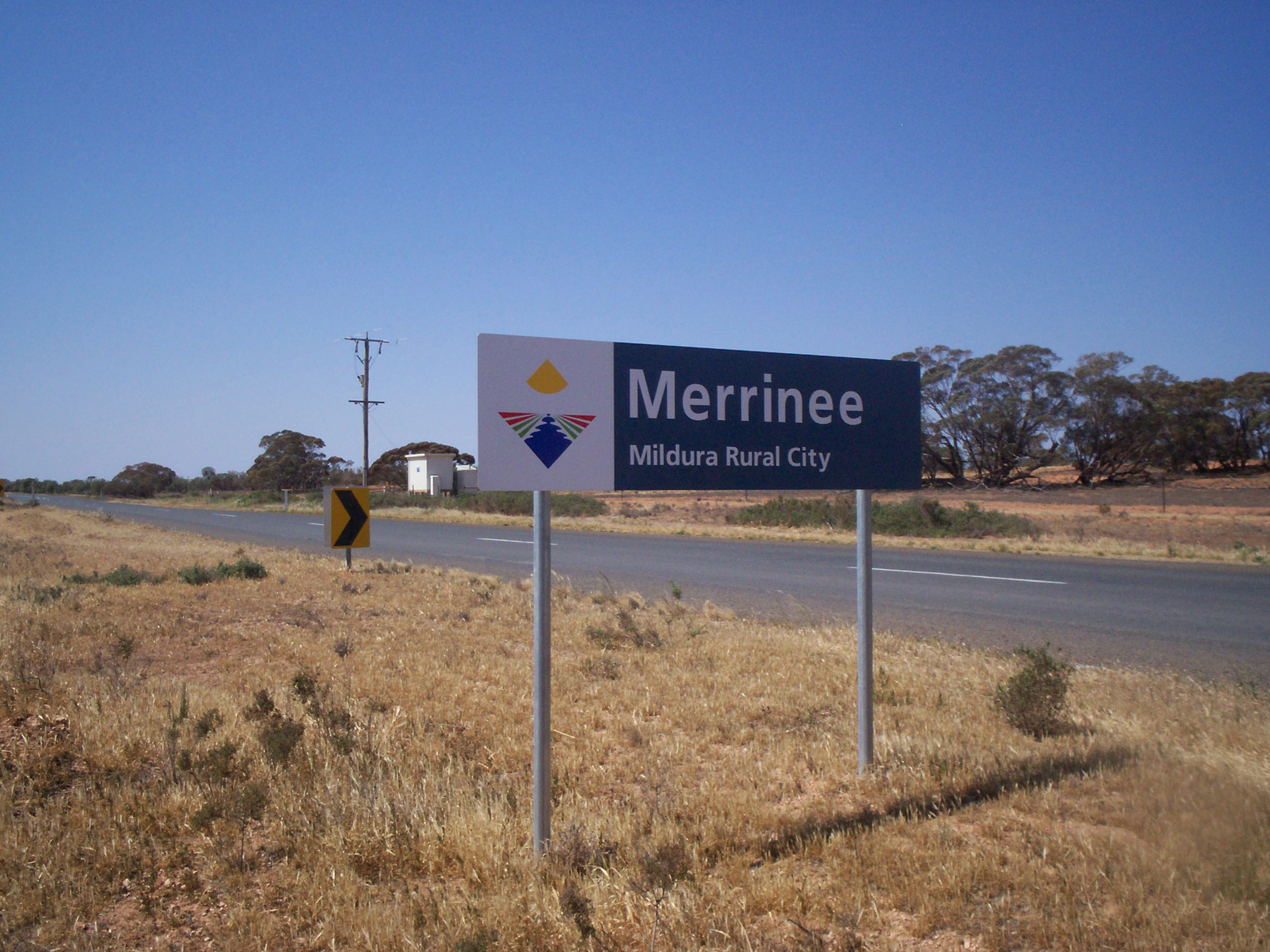
- Merrinee

- Coordinates: 34°22′17″S 141°48′03″E
- Country: Australia
- State: Victoria
- Region: Sunraysia
- LGA: Rural City of Mildura
- Location: 560 km (350 mi) from Melbourne; 58 km (36 mi) from Mildura; 11 km (6.8 mi) from Karawinna; 7 km (4.3 mi) from Pirlta

Government
  - State electorate: Mildura
  - Federal division: Mallee

Population
  - Total: 48 (2016 census)
- Postcode: 3496
Localities around Merrinee
Cullulleraine	Wargan	Merbein South
Werrimull	Merrinee	Koorlong, Carwarp
Murray-Sunset	Murray-Sunset	Murray-Sunset

Merrinee is a locality situated in the Sunraysia region. It is situated about 7 kilometres west of Pirlta and 11 kilometres east of Karawinna, on the Red Cliffs-Meringur Road.

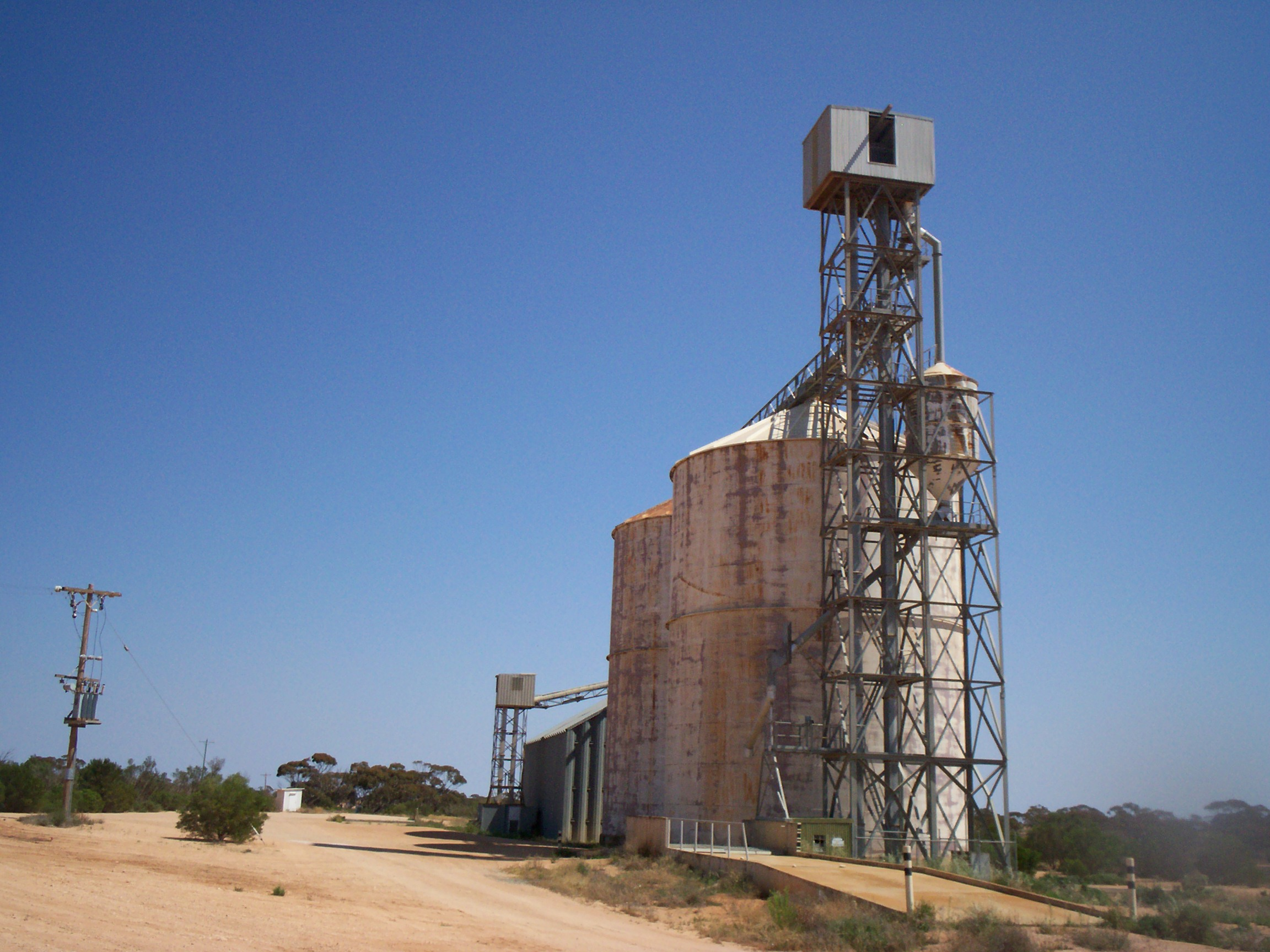
Defunct silo in Merrinee.

The Morkalla railway line opened on 10 April 1924 with a goods, grain and passenger siding, followed by the post office on 30 May 1924. The railway closed in 1988.

The general area contains a number of previous localities which existed when the population was larger, namely Thurla 34°22′S 142°06′E which had a post office open from 1925 until 1940, Benetook 34°22′00″S 142°00′00″E with a post office from 1925 until 1946 and Pirlta 34°21′55″S 141°53′59″E with a post office from 1911 until 1961.
