= Cabarita, Victoria =

Cabarita
- Town
- Coordinates: 34.20°S 142.083°E
- Country: Australia
- State: Victoria
- LGA: Rural City of Mildura
- Location: 546 km (339 mi) from Melbourne; 10 km (6.2 mi) from Mildura; 105 km (65 mi) from Ouyen; 18 km (11 mi) from Red Cliffs

Government
  - State electorate: Mildura
  - Federal division: Mallee

Population
  - Total: 488 (2016 census)
- Postcode: 3505
Localities around Cabarita
Birdwoodton	Birdwoodton	Mildura
Birdwoodton	Cabarita	Birdwoodton
Birdwoodton	Mildura	Mildura

Cabarita is a suburb of Mildura, Victoria, Australia, located approximately 10 km from the CBD. At the 2016 census, Cabarita had a population of 488.

The Post Office opened on 1 July 1925 and was known for some months as Lake Hawthorn before being renamed Cabarita.
