= Neds Corner =

- Town
- Coordinates: 34°17′S 141°16′E
- Country: Australia
- State: Victoria
- LGA: Rural City of Mildura
- Location: 622 km (386 mi) from Melbourne; 87 km (54 mi) from Mildura; 54 km (34 mi) from Renmark; 31 km (19 mi) from Cullulleraine

Population
  - Total: 0 (2021 census)
- Postcode: 3496
Localities around Neds Corner
| Murray-Sunset | New South Wales | New South Wales |
| Murray-Sunset | Neds Corner | Cullulleraine |
| Meringur | Meringur | Werrimull |

Neds Corner is a locality in Victoria, Australia. It is located approximately 31 km from Cullulleraine, Victoria and bordered to the north by the Murray River.

Within the area of the locality is the smaller area of Kulnine, and Lock 9 on the Murray which had a Post Office open from 1923 until 1969.

== See also ==
Neds Corner Station
