= Merbein West =

Merbein West Victoria
- Coordinates: 34°09′56″S 142°00′30″E
- Population: 190 (2016 census)
- Postcode(s): 3505
- LGA(s): Rural City of Mildura
- State electorate(s): Mildura
- Federal division(s): Mallee
Localities around Merbein West:
Wargan	Yelta	Yelta
Wargan	Merbein West	Merbein
Wargan	Merbein South	Merbein

Merbein West is a locality in the Rural City of Mildura, Victoria, Australia. Merbein West post office opened on 1 July 1919 and was closed on 30 June 1971.
