= Kurnwill =

Coordinates: 34°28′02″S 141°25′38″E

Kurnwill Victoria
- Postcode(s): 3496
- Location: 536 km (333 mi) from Melbourne; 99 km (62 mi) from Mildura; 15 km (9 mi) from Tunart; 6 km (4 mi) from Bambill South
- LGA(s): Rural City of Mildura
- Region: Sunraysia
- State electorate(s): Mildura
- Federal division(s): Mallee

Kurnwill is a locality situated on the Tarrango-Tunart Road in the Sunraysia region. The place by road, is situated about 15 kilometres eas from Tunart and 6 kilometres west from Bambill South.Kurnwill had a school operating in the 20s and thirties. The original building can be found at the Meringur Pioneer Village in full working order.
