= Wargan =

- Town
- Coordinates: 34°16′S 141°57′E
- Country: Australia
- State: Victoria
- LGA: Rural City of Mildura
- Location: 558 km (347 mi) from Melbourne; 26 km (16 mi) from Mildura; 44 km (27 mi) from Werrimull; 417 km (259 mi) from Bendigo

Government
  - State electorate: Mildura
  - Federal division: Mallee

Population
  - Total: 53 (2021 census)
- Postcode: 3505
Localities around Wargan
New South Wales	New South Wales	Yelta
Cullulleraine	Wargan	Merbein West
Werrimull	Merrinee	Merbein South

Wargan is a locality in Victoria, Australia, located approximately 26 km from Mildura, Victoria. At the 2021 census, Wargan had a population of 53.
