= Karween =

Karween Victoria
- Coordinates: 34°22′32″S 141°14′19″E
- Postcode(s): 3496
- Location: 551 km (342 mi) from Melbourne; 104 km (65 mi) from Mildura; 9 km (6 mi) from Morkalla; 6 km (4 mi) from Meringur
- LGA(s): Rural City of Mildura
- Region: Sunraysia
- State electorate(s): Mildura
- Federal division(s): Mallee

Karween is a locality situated on the Redcliffs-Merringur Road in the Sunraysia region, south of the Sturt Highway. It is about 9 kilometres (about 5.6 miles) east from Morkalla and 6 kilometres (about 3.7 miles) west from Meringur. The railway arrived soon after the area was settled by returned servicemen after World War I, in 1931, and closed in 1964. Karween had a progress association operating in the 1930s.
