= Yarrara =

Coordinates: 34°20′17″S 141°27′05″E

- Town
- Country: Australia
- State: Victoria
- Region: Sunraysia
- LGA: Rural City of Mildura
- Location: 535 km (332 mi) from Melbourne; 88 km (55 mi) from Mildura; 10 km (6.2 mi) from Meringur; 6 km (3.7 mi) from Bambill

Government
  - State electorate: Mildura
  - Federal division: Mallee
- Postcode: 3496

Yarrara is a locality situated on the Redcliffs-Merringur Road and the former Morkalla railway line in the Sunraysia region of Victoria. It is about 10 kilometres east from Meringur and 6 kilometres west from Bambill.
