= Merbein =

- Town
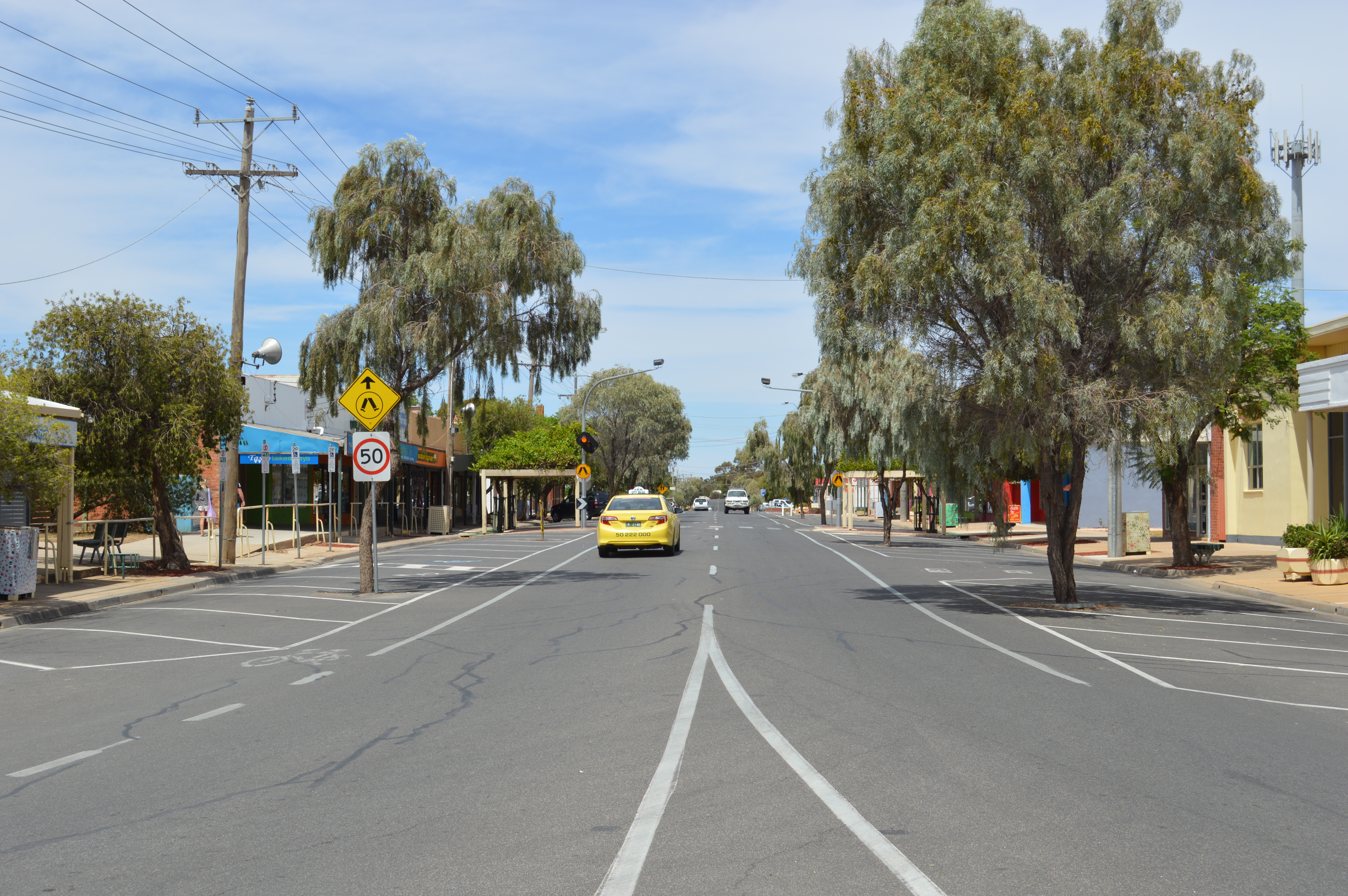
- Commercial Street, the main street of Merbein

- Coordinates: 34°10′S 142°03′E
- Country: Australia
- State: Victoria
- LGA: Rural City of Mildura
- Location: 553 km (344 mi) northwest of Melbourne; 12 km (7.5 mi) northwest of Mildura
- Established: 1912

Government
  - State electorate: Mildura
  - Federal division: Mallee
- Elevation: 56 m (184 ft)

Population
  - Total: 4,976 (2021 census)
- Postcode: 3505
- Mean max temp: 23.7 °C (74.7 °F)
- Mean min temp: 9.7 °C (49.5 °F)
- Annual rainfall: 285.1 mm (11.22 in)
Localities around Merbein
Yelta	New South Wales	New South Wales
Merbein West	Merbein	New South Wales
Merbein South	Merbein South	Birdwoodton

Merbein is a town in the Rural City of Mildura, Victoria, Australia. It is on the Calder Highway between Mildura and the Murray River crossing at the Abbotsford Bridge to Curlwaa. At the 2016 census, the town had a population of 1,981. Merbein is 12 kilometres from Mildura, 553 kilometres (344 mi) from Melbourne and 389 kilometres (242 mi) from Adelaide.

The town is known for farming and is part what is informally called the "fruit bowl" or "food bowl", the growing region roughly made of the Coomealla and Sunraysia irrigation districts fed by the Darling and Murray rivers. Produce farmed in Merbein include grapes, citrus, mushrooms, green beans, asparagus and pistachios.

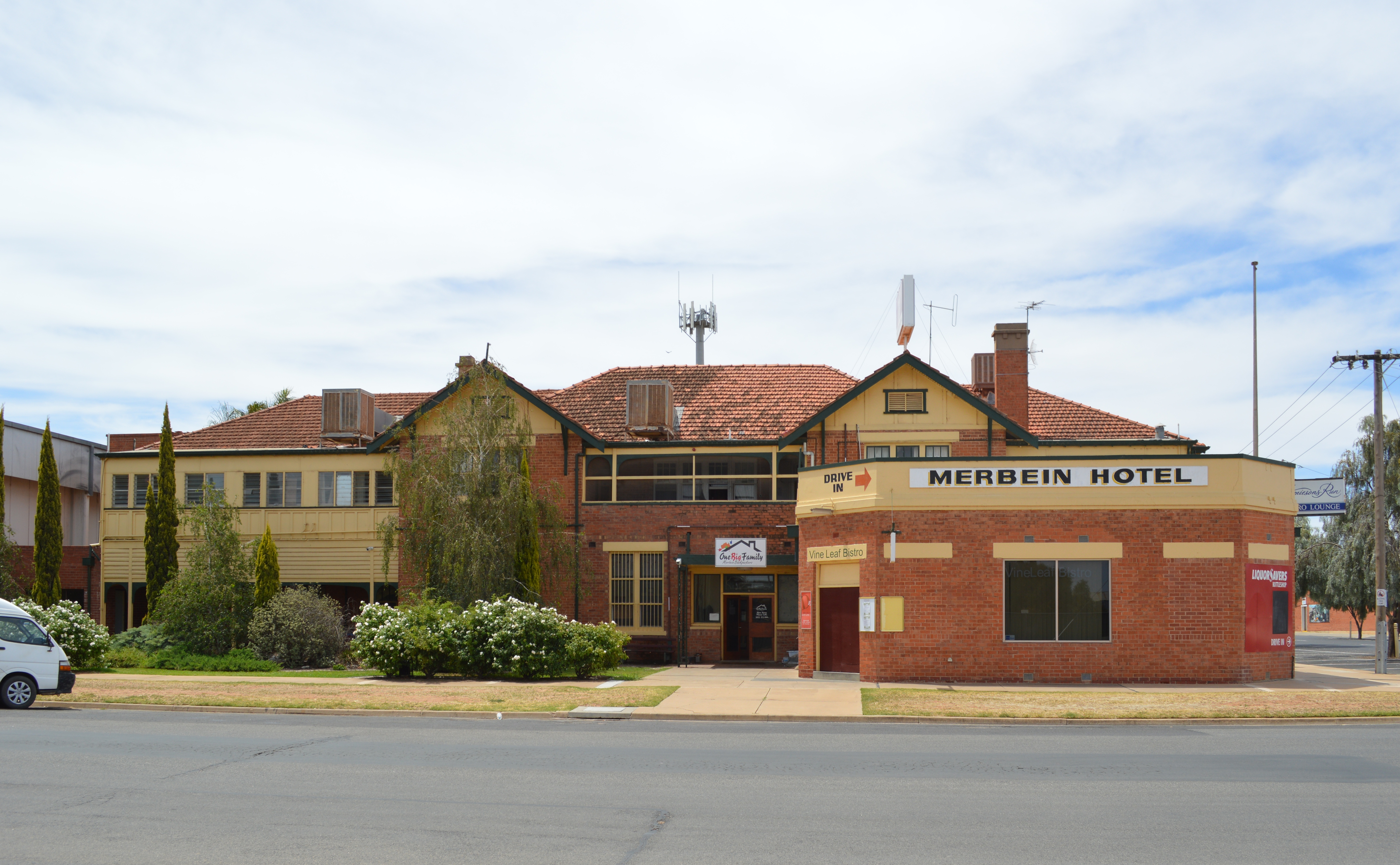
Merbein Hotel

Merbein is also home of Mildura Wines, a winery W. B. Chaffey built in 1913 for the first intake of grapes in 1914. The winery, originally known as the Mildura Distillery and Winery, stands on a 30-metre sandstone cliff near Pump Hill.

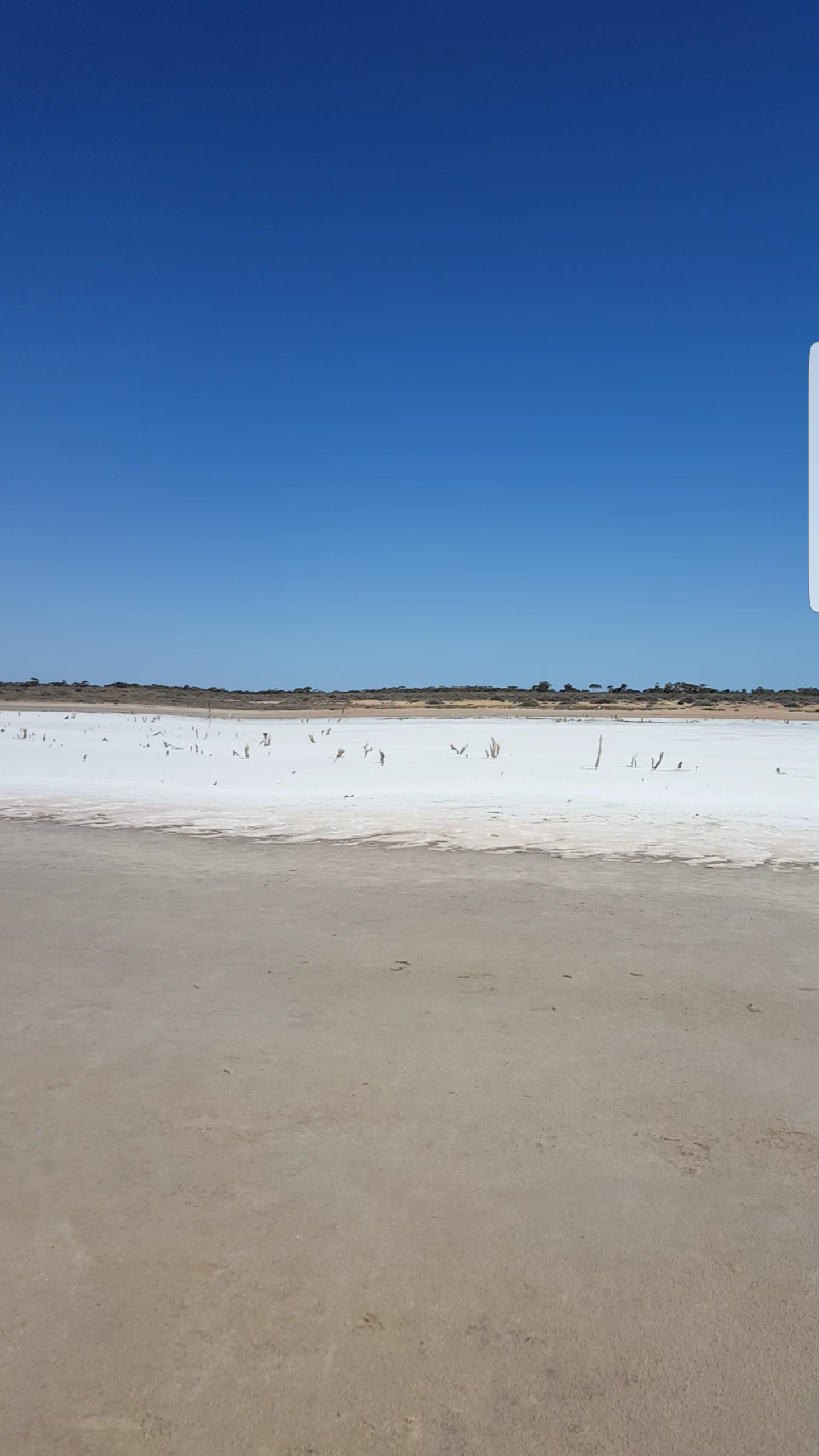
Salt lake at Merbein, October 2024.

== History ==
Merbein is the most northern Victorian town and celebrated 100 years as an irrigation settlement in 2009. The Merbein irrigation settlement, originally known as White Cliffs for its river cliffs, was established on a pastoral holding in 1909. It was one of the first state-owned pumped irrigation settlements in Victoria. A Rotary Club of Merbein sign states: "Irrigation commenced in 1910 originally for pasture and grain crops, but quickly assumed its present economy of vineyard and orchard culture."

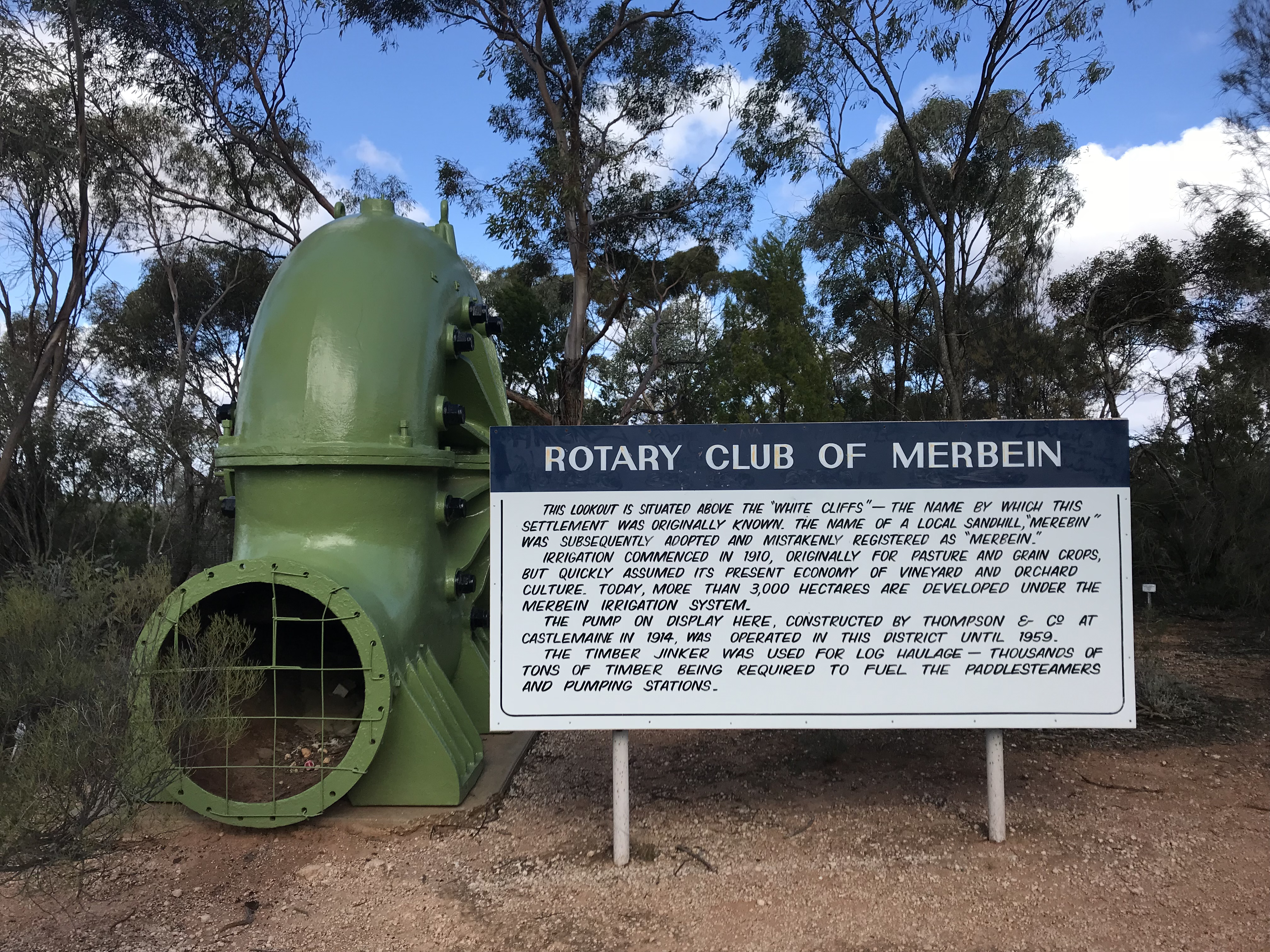
Sign found at the cliffs near Mildara winery

The settlement was originally known as White Cliffs because of its river white cliffs. It was intended to be renamed "Merebin", reputedly an Aboriginal name of a local sandhill, but it was mistakenly registered as "Merbein" instead.

The post office opened on 16 August 1909. In 1912 the irrigation settlement's name was officially changed to Merbein.

E. J. Kenny was the first Officer in Charge of the State Rivers & Water Supply Commission of Victoria Irrigation Area established in 1909. The hot climate and the distance from markets saw the settlement quickly change from dairying to the growing of the less perishable crops of citrus and grapes for drying and spirit making.

Soldier settlement blocks were established in Birdwoodton and Merbein West during and after WW1 and many streets were named after local soldiers who died in WW1. The district's horticulture and viticultural industries also attracted many European immigrants to the area.

Kenny died suddenly in 1925 and his contribution to the success of the settlement was acknowledged with the naming of Kenny Park. Today, Merbein continues to be an irrigation district, diversifying from the growing of dried grapes and citrus to a wide variety of wine and table grapes, asparagus, almonds, mushrooms and vegetables. As well as a wine bottling and packaging industry and a vegetable juicing facility, Merbein has also developed as a regional transport hub for the export of district products.

== Sport ==
The town has an Australian Rules football team competing in the Sunraysia Football League.

Sporting clubs include the Merbein Football and Netball Club (Magpies) based at Kenny Park, the Merbein South Cricket Club and Saints Baseball Club both based at Chaffey Park, Mildura City Soccer Club, as well as the Merbein Cobras Basketball club. Merbein also has recreational and sporting facilities such as football, cricket and soccer grounds, a swimming pool, lawn bowling and croquet greens, tennis and netball courts, a golf club and formed walking tracks at the Merbein Common. Other sporting groups are located in the area including tennis, swimming, Tae Kwon Do, and soccer.

Golfers play at the Merbein Golf Club course on McEdward Street.

The Merbein Cobras is the town club in the MBA (Mildura Basketball Association) that trains at Merbein P-10 College.

== Education ==
Students from Prep through to year 10 attend Merbein P-10 College. The school underwent improvements after it was converted in 2013 from a High school (years 7 to year 10), into a Prep to year 10. Prior to the redevelopment there were three small primary school campuses, located at Merbein, Merbein West, Merbein South. These sites have since been abandoned, and all students are located at the previous Merbein Secondary College Campus.

== Events ==
Merbein was holder of the Great Australian Vanilla Slice Triumph from 2011 to 2016, but since 2017 its home has been Mildura's Langtree mall after Mildura City Heart took over with the help from Mildura Rural City Council. It was held by Ouyen for 14 years previously.

In September, Merbein holds the Merbein Community Rodeo at Kenny Park.

== Notable institutions ==
- In 1911, the Fisher family founded Fishers Supermarkets with its first shop on the corner of Commercial St and Railway Ave. But in 2015, fourth-generation owner Alan Fisher sold what came to be the second biggest independent supermarket group in Victoria to Ritchies IGA, Australia’s biggest independent supermarket group.
- Up until 2012, the CSIRO Plant Research Division had a base at Merbein South focussing on grape and citrus industries.
- Rail freight services to Melbourne run from Merbein along the Mildura railway line from a terminal operated by Wakefield Transport.
- Merbein was the closest town to Cowra station, 18 miles (29 km) from Mildura, for many years managed by Elliott Crozier and his family.

== Notable people ==
- Hassa Mann - Melbourne Footballer
- Adam Goodes - Sydney Swans footballer
- Matthew Knights - Richmond Tigers footballer
- Colin Sylvia - Melbourne Footballer
- Tania Zaetta - actress and TV personality
