= Merbein South =

- Town
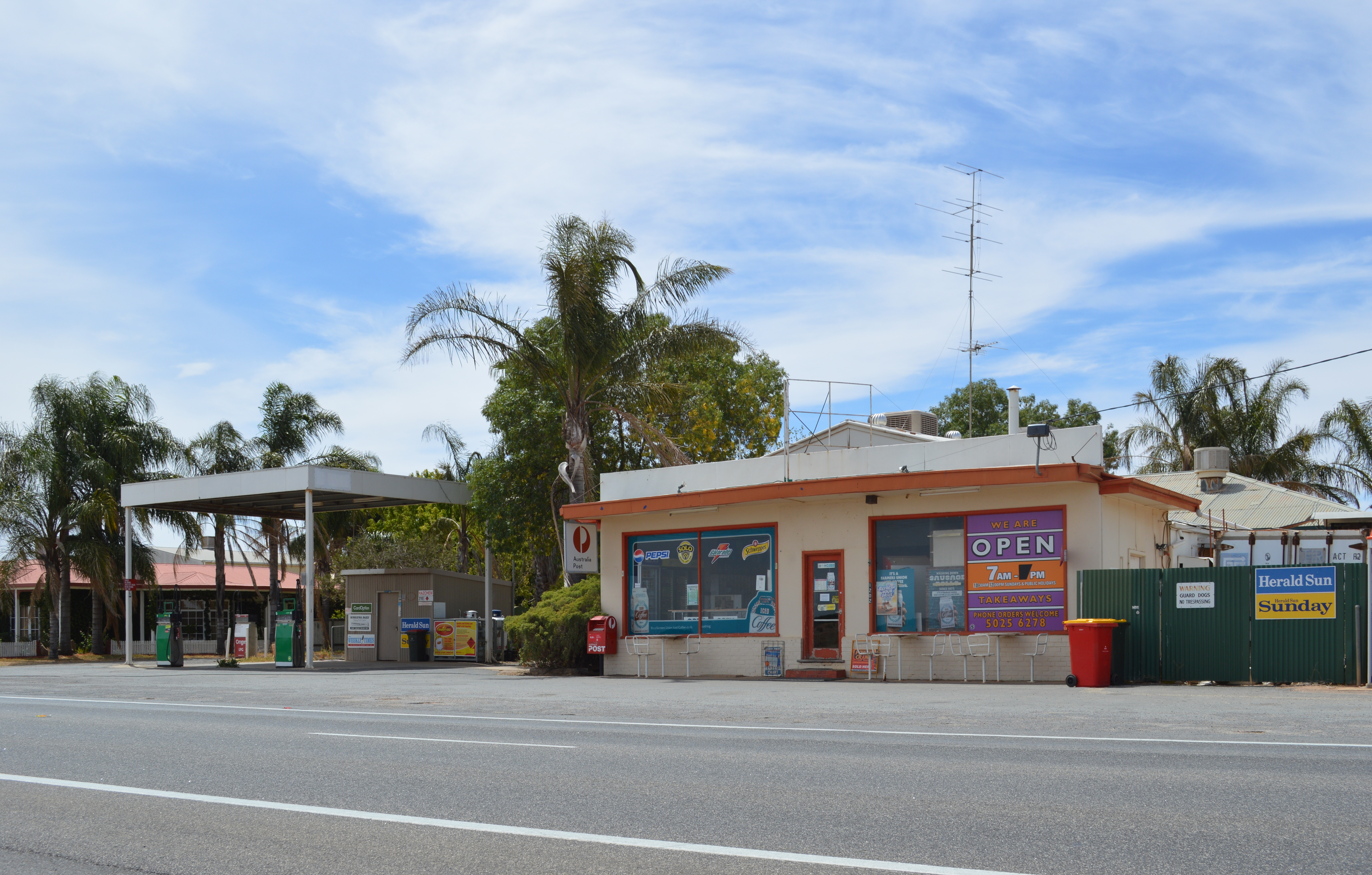
- General store

- Coordinates: 34°13′S 142°02′E
- Country: Australia
- State: Victoria
- LGA: Rural City of Mildura
- Location: 550 km (340 mi) from Melbourne; 384 km (239 mi) from Adelaide; 16 km (9.9 mi) from Mildura; 23 km (14 mi) from Wentworth

Government
  - State electorate: Mildura
  - Federal division: Mallee

Population
  - Total: 405 (2016 census)
- Postcode: 3505
Localities around Merbein South
Merbein West	Merbein	Merbein
Wargan	Merbein South	Birdwoodton
Merrinee	Koorlong	Koorlong

Merbein South is a locality in Victoria, Australia, located approximately 16 kilometres (9.9 mi) from Mildura. At the 2016 census, Merbein South had a population of 405.

The Post Office opened on 14 September 1915.
