= Tarrango, Victoria =

Coordinates: 34°29′58″S 141°47′59″E

Tarrango is a parish in the Mallee region of Victoria, Australia. It is approximately 460km northwest of Melbourne and is close in proximity to the Murray-Sunset National Park.

The Tarrango grape variety, released by the CSIRO in 1975, was named after this Parish.
