= Werrimull =

- Town
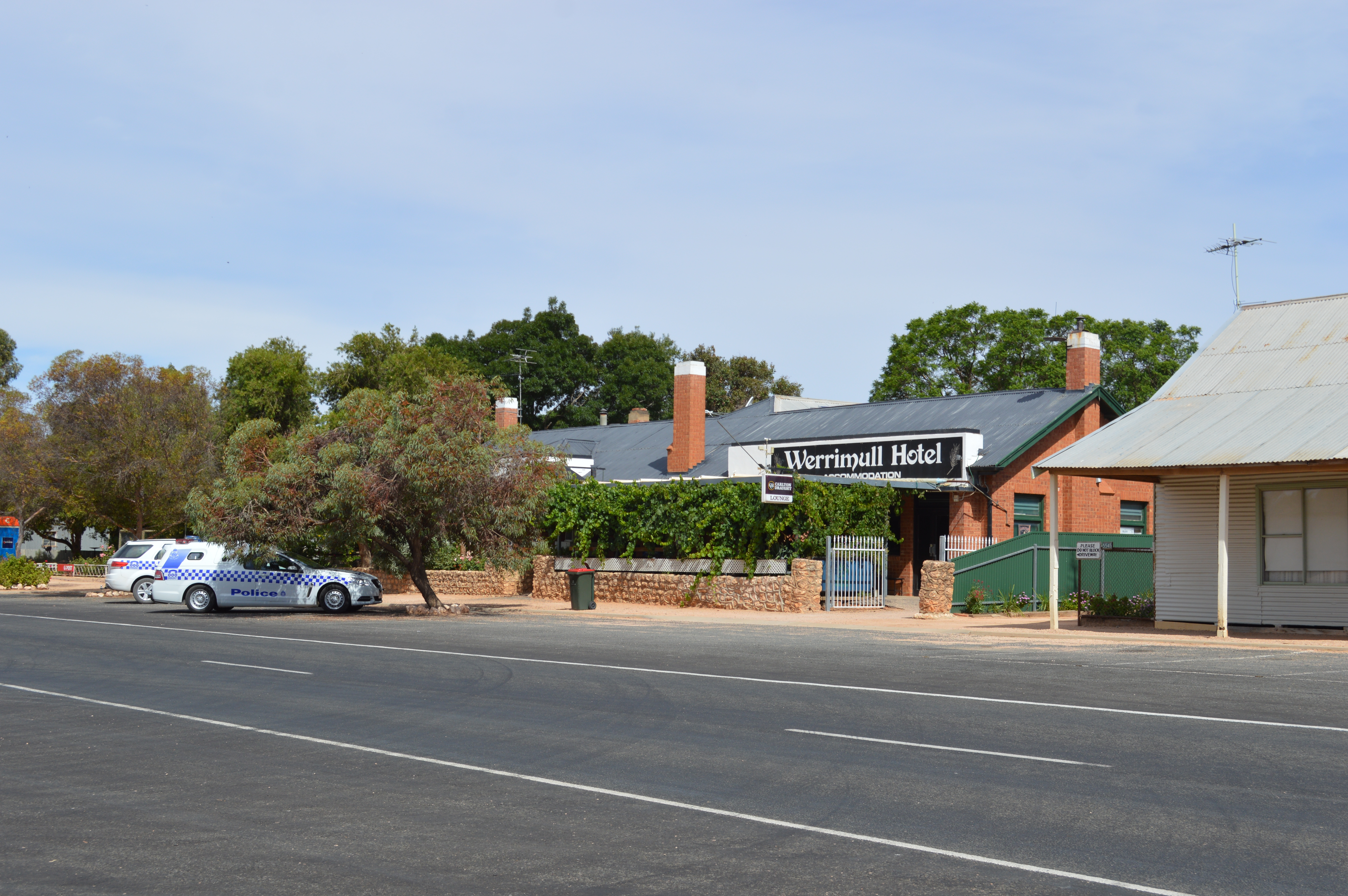
- Werrimull Hotel

- Coordinates: 34°23′S 141°36′E
- Country: Australia
- State: Victoria
- Region: Sunraysia
- LGA: Rural City of Mildura
- Location: 571 km (355 mi) from Melbourne; 79 km (49 mi) from Mildura; 10 km (6.2 mi) from Bambill; 10 km (6.2 mi) from Karawinna

Government
  - State electorate: Mildura
  - Federal division: Mallee

Population
  - Total: 97 (2021 census)
- Postcode: 3496
Localities around Werrimull
Neds Corner	Cullulleraine	Wargan
Meringur	Werrimull	Merrinee
Murray-Sunset	Murray-Sunset	Murray-Sunset

Werrimull town in the Rural City of Mildura, Victoria, Australia. The place by road, is situated about 10 kilometres west of Karawinna and 10 kilometres east of Bambill. It is 79 kilometres (49 mi) west southwest of Mildura, 13 kilometres south of the Sturt Highway opposite Lake Cullulleraine. At the 2016 census, Werrimull and the surrounding area had a population of 112, declining from 320 in 2011.

Werrimull is an indigenous Australian word believed to mean Eagle. Werrimull is sometimes misspelt Werrimul possibly because it is confused with an indigenous group from the Horsham region.

== History ==
The Millewa was opened up to farming in the 1920s, the Post Office opening on 24 June 1924. The railway reached Werrimull in 1923, officially opened 1924, but closed by 1989. Much of the native Eucalyptus trees were cleared to make way for farming. This has given rise to soil salinity in the area.

Most of the Werrimull area was a Soldier Settlement with blocks of approximately 1-square-mile (2.6 km^{2}) allocated. This was found to be too small and many were unable to make a living in this region. The population of the Millewa has been in steady decline over many years.

The area of the locality contains a number of previous localities which existed when the population was larger, namely Bambill which had a post office open from 1926 until 1959, Bambill South with a post office from 1928 until 1930, Karawinna with a post office from 1924 until 1970, Karawinna North on the Sturt Highway with a post office from 1928 until 1951, Yarrara with a post office from 1926 until 1978 and Yarrara North on the Sturt Highway.

== The town today ==
The main industry in Werrimull and the Millewa is the harvesting of grains such as wheat, barley and oats. There is also a strong sheep and cattle industry.

Werrimull is also a stop-over for a small number of tourists that visit the Millewa Pioneer Forest.

Werrimull has an Australian rules football team competing in the Millewa Football League that was strong in the 1920s and 1970s. Their most recent premiership win was in 2013.

Werrimull P-12 School, the main school in the Millewa, caters for students from the ages of 5 to 18.
