= Pirlta =

Coordinates: 34°21′55″S 141°53′59″E

- Town
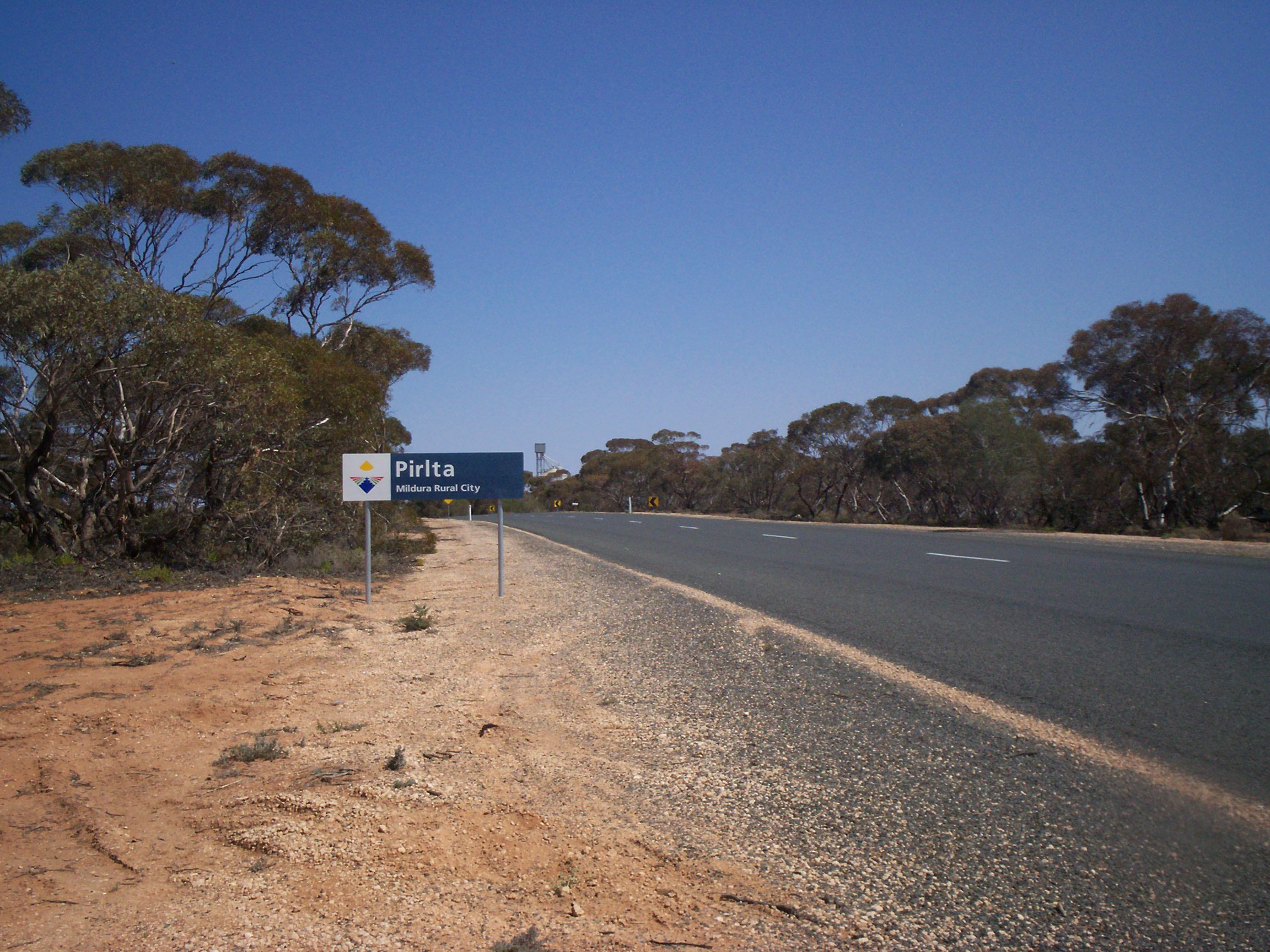
- Pirlta
- Country: Australia
- State: Victoria
- Region: Sunraysia
- LGA: Rural City of Mildura
- Location: 553 km (344 mi) from Melbourne; 51 km (32 mi) from Mildura; 8 km (5.0 mi) from Benetook; 7 km (4.3 mi) from Merinee

Government
  - State electorate: Mildura
  - Federal division: Mallee
- Postcode: 3496

Pirlta is a locality situated in the Sunraysia region in Australia. The place by road, is situated about 8 kilometres west from Benetook and 7 kilometres east from Merrinee. The Post Office opened on 14 August 1924 (closing in 1964).
