= Millewa =

Region of Victoria, Australia

The Millewa is a region of north western Victoria in Australia.

== History ==
The County of Millewa was proclaimed in the area in the nineteenth century. In the 1960s the then dryland farming areas of Nangiloc and Colignan were irrigated. Subsequently, they became less seen as being in the Millewa, and more being part of Sunraysia. In the late 1990s, irrigation came to northern Millewa towns like Cullulleraine. These still remain firmly "Millewa" however.

== Geography ==
It covers the triangular area north of the Sunset Country and south of the diagonal Murray River that grows wheat and other dryland crops. The part of this triangle that is irrigated is known as Sunraysia.

The major centres of the region are Werrimull, Meringur, Cullulleraine and Hattah. Sometimes Nangiloc and Colignan are included in the region.

The Millewa is often considered part of the Victorian outback.

== Culture and sport ==
The main binding force of the region is the Millewa Football League, which still has clubs named for many towns in the region. However, many of their players now come from Sunraysia.

There is also a cricket team that plays in the Red Cliffs Cricket Association, and a newsletter.

== Notable people ==
Notable people from or who have lived in Millewa include:

- Jacinta Duncan, science educator and molecular biologist
