= Cullulleraine =

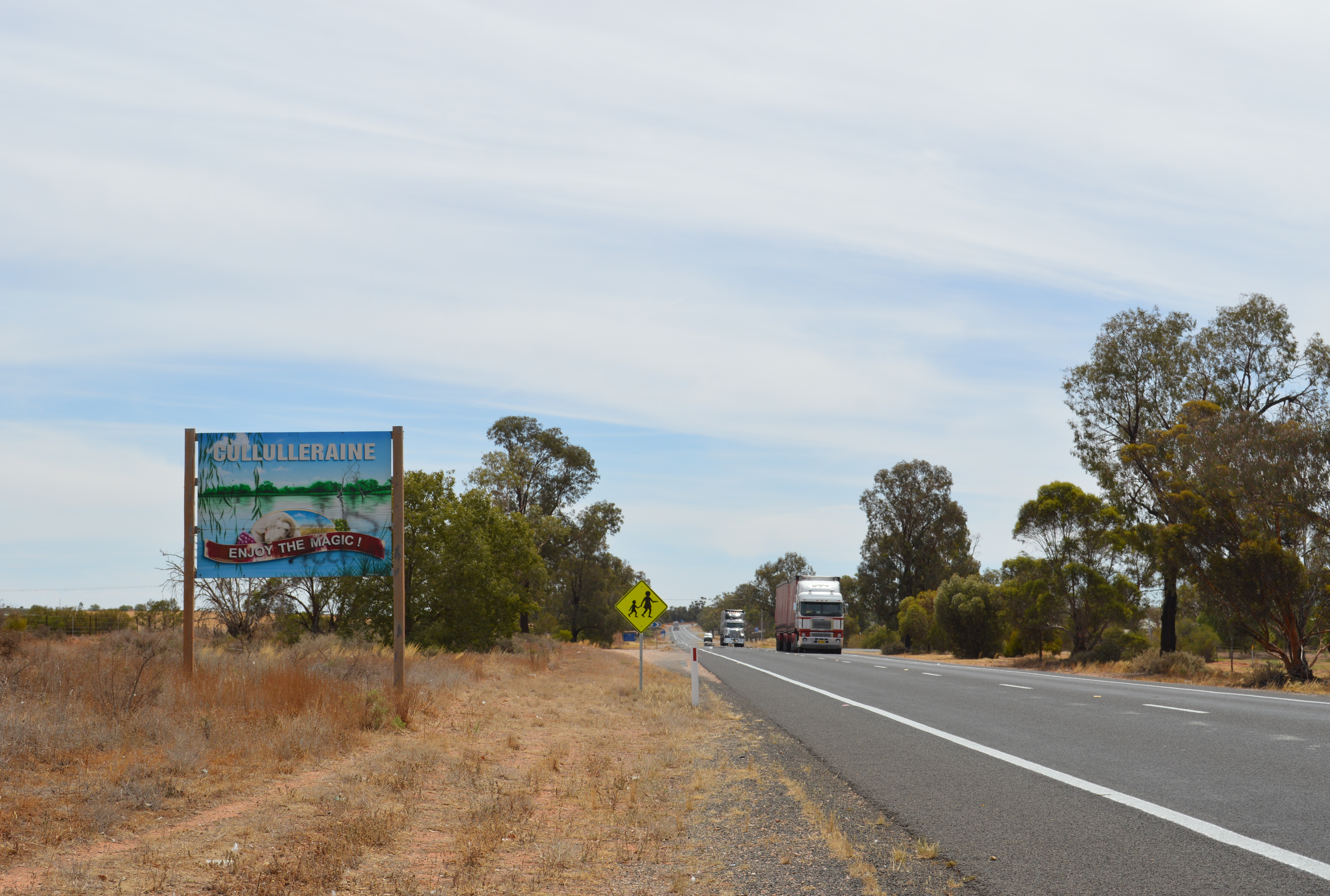
- Sturt Highway passing through Cullulleraine

- Coordinates: 34.280°S 141.598°E
- Country: Australia
- State: Victoria
- Region: Millewa
- LGA: Rural City of Mildura
- Location: 16 km (9.9 mi) N of Werrimull; 56 km (35 mi) W of Mildura

Government
  - State electorate: Mildura
  - Federal division: Mallee

Population
  - Total: 81 (2021 census)
- Postcode: 3496
Localities around Cullulleraine
New South Wales	New South Wales	New South Wales
New South Wales	Cullulleraine	Wargan
Werrimull	Werrimull	Merrinee

Cullulleraine is a locality on the Sturt Highway in northwestern Victoria, Australia, 56 kilometres (35 mi) west of Mildura and 16 kilometres (10 mi) north of Werrimull.

The local business Golden Grain Flour Mills Pty Ltd is a major employer in the rural community.

The Cullulleraine Post Office opened on 17 November 1924.
