= Meringur =

- Town
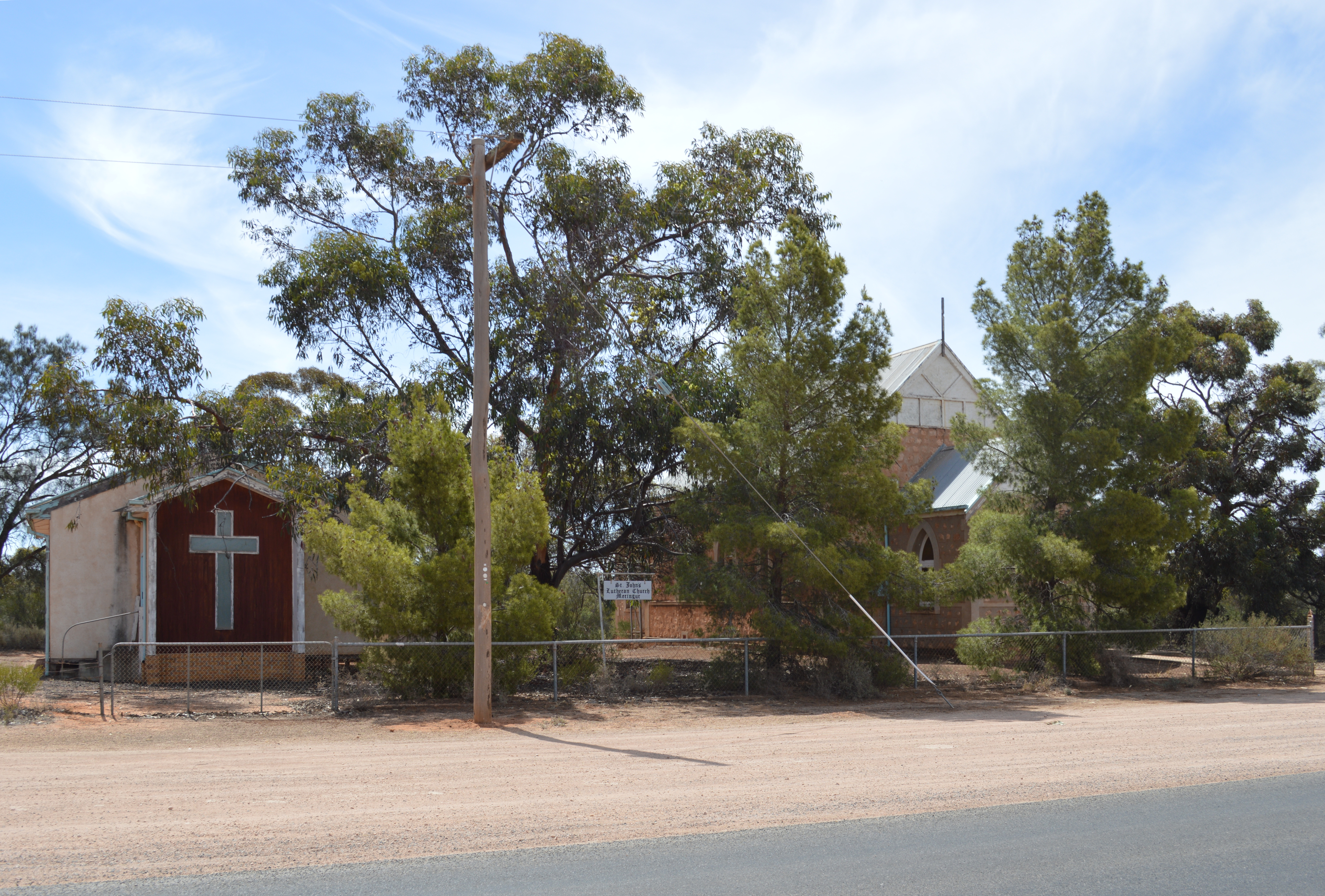
- St John the Evangelist's Lutheran church, built in a style similar to those in South Australia

- Coordinates: 34°23′S 141°21′E
- Country: Australia
- State: Victoria
- LGA: Rural City of Mildura
- Location: 637 km (396 mi) NW of Melbourne; 98 km (61 mi) W of Mildura; 71 km (44 mi) E of Renmark (SA)

Government
  - State electorate: Mildura
  - Federal division: Mallee

Population
  - Total: 70 (2021 census)
- Postcode: 3496
Localities around Meringur
| Murray-Sunset | Neds Corner | Neds Corner |
| Murray-Sunset | Meringur | Werrimull |
| Murray-Sunset | Murray-Sunset | Murray-Sunset |

Meringur is a locality to the west of Mildura in northwestern Victoria, Australia. At the 2016 census, Meringur and the surrounding area had a population of 67 down from 128 in 2011. It is located in the Millewa region at the end of the Red Cliffs-Meringur Road towards the South Australian border.

The Post Office opened on 2 February 1926. The railway opened in 1925, and the station had facilities to handle passengers, sheep and grain. The line was extended to Morkalla in 1931, but the extension closed in 1965. The entire line was closed by 1988.

The Millewa Pioneer Forest and Historical Village open-air museum is in Meringur.

Meringur has an Australian rules football team competing in the Millewa Football League, although in recent years the team has been based in Mildura. It went into recess in 2011 due to lack of players but has since reformed.
