= Sunraysia =

Region of Australia

Coordinates: 34°12′22.17″S 142°08′08.61″E

- Region
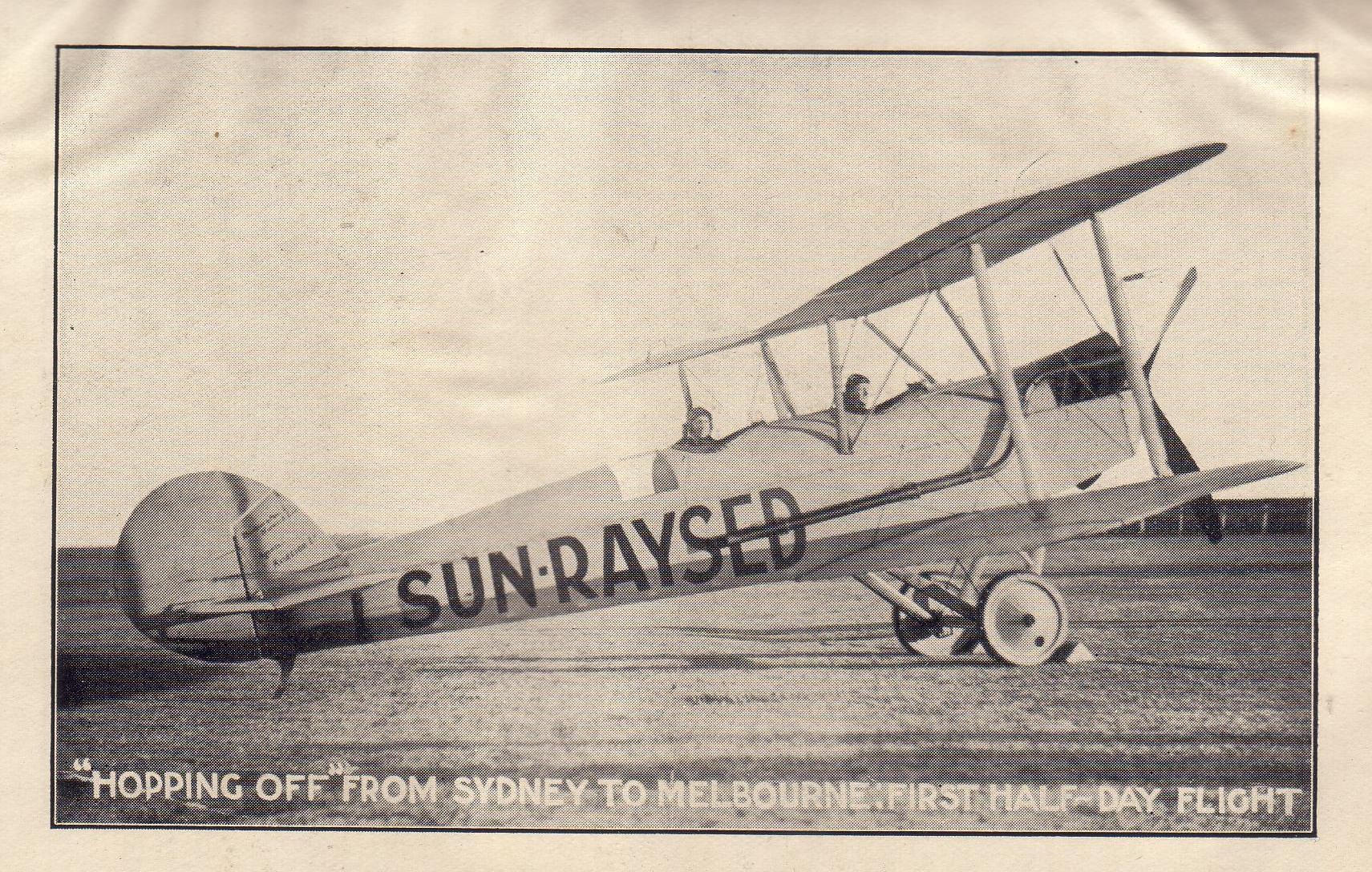
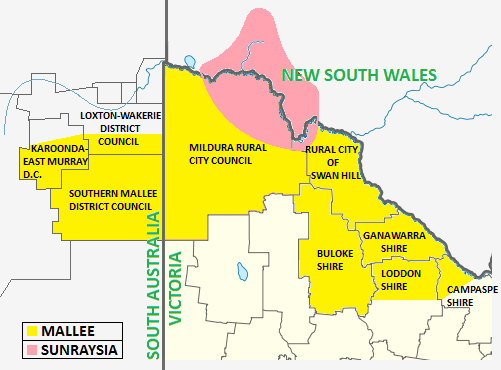
- Jack De Garis promoting "Sun-Raysed", a coined word which later generated "Sunraysia". An image showing the outline of the Mallee and Sunraysia district (red circle) which is predominantly contained within the Rural City of Mildura.
- Country: Australia
- State: Australia
- LGAs: Mildura (Vic) (Note: The current and historically irrigated areas are most often considered to be Sunraysia.); Wentworth (NSW) (Note: The Wentworth township and the irrigated areas of the Shire are most often considered to be Sunraysia.); Swan Hill (Vic) (Note: Only the Robinvale/Boundary Bend area is sometimes considered to be Sunraysia.); Balranald (NSW) (Note: Only the Euston area is sometimes considered to be Sunraysia.)

Government
  - State electorates: Mildura (Vic); Murray (NSW)
  - Federal divisions: Farrer (NSW); Mallee (Vic)
Regions around Sunraysia
Western Division	Western Division	Western Division
Millewa	Sunraysia	Riverina
Millewa	Mallee	Mid-Murray

Sunraysia is a region located in northwestern Victoria and southwestern New South Wales in Australia. The region is renowned for its sunshine-intensive horticulture including grapes and oranges. Its main centre is Mildura, Victoria.

The area of Victoria to the west of Sunraysia is known as the Millewa, the main distinction being that Sunraysia is the irrigated area and the Millewa is the dryland cropping area.

Sunraysia is sometimes incorrectly referred to as an economic region. The area around Mildura, Victoria and Wentworth, New South Wales is also known as the Murray outback.

== Etymology ==
The name Sunraysia derives from a contest that entrepreneur Jack De Garis held in 1919, as part of a promotion on behalf of the Australian Dried Fruits Association. The public were invited to submit a name to describe the dried fruits grown in the Mildura area. The winning name was Sun-Raysed, which was modified as Sunraysia to describe the district as a whole. In 1920, De Garis started a newspaper in Mildura called the Sunraysia Daily, helping to establish the name.

== Pest Free Area ==
The Greater Sunraysia district forms part of the Fruit Fly Free Exclusion Zone, a Pest Free Area (PFA) that was created in 2007 located between north-west Victoria and south-west New South Wales. It is renowned for the production of high value horticultural crops including citrus, table grapes and stone fruit. The PFA is aligned to this production area to provide greater fruit fly control measures. The Victorian Department of Environment and Primary Industries (DEPI) and New South Wales Department of Primary Industries (DPI) have implemented stringent legislative controls on the movement of host fruit and vegetables into the PFA to keep it free from the Queensland fruit fly (QFF) and maintain high value markets, which are worth millions of dollars to local industries. The PFA enables commercial horticultural products to be marketed without postharvest chemical treatments for QFF. The PFA follows the course of the Murray River from Kerang to Wentworth and the Darling River from Wentworth to Pooncarie.

== Major settlements ==
In addition to Mildura, the other major settlements in the district are Robinvale, Irymple, Red Cliffs, Merbein, Wentworth, Dareton and Buronga-Gol Gol.

== Education facilities ==
The Mildura campuses of Sunraysia Institute of TAFE (SuniTAFE) and La Trobe University are located on Benetook Ave between 11th and 14th Streets. SuniTAFE has an additional site in Cardross. The Coomealla Campus of TAFE NSW is in Dareton.

== Media ==
The main newspaper that services the region is the Sunraysia Daily, and is published on Monday, Wednesday, Friday, and Saturday. Sunraysia was also serviced by two free papers; the Sunraysia Life and the Mildura Weekly were published on Fridays. The Mildura Independent was another free weekly, published on Sundays from 1982 to 2007. My Mildura was a free monthly magazine. There are also a number of paid weeklies covering smaller areas within Sunraysia.

Local radio stations include ABC Mildura Swan Hill, RIVER1467 (1467AM 3ML), Triple M 97.9, Hit 99.5, and Hot FM.

Television stations in Sunraysia include ABC Victoria, Channel Nine Mildura (part of the WIN Television network), and 7 Mildura.

== Gallery ==
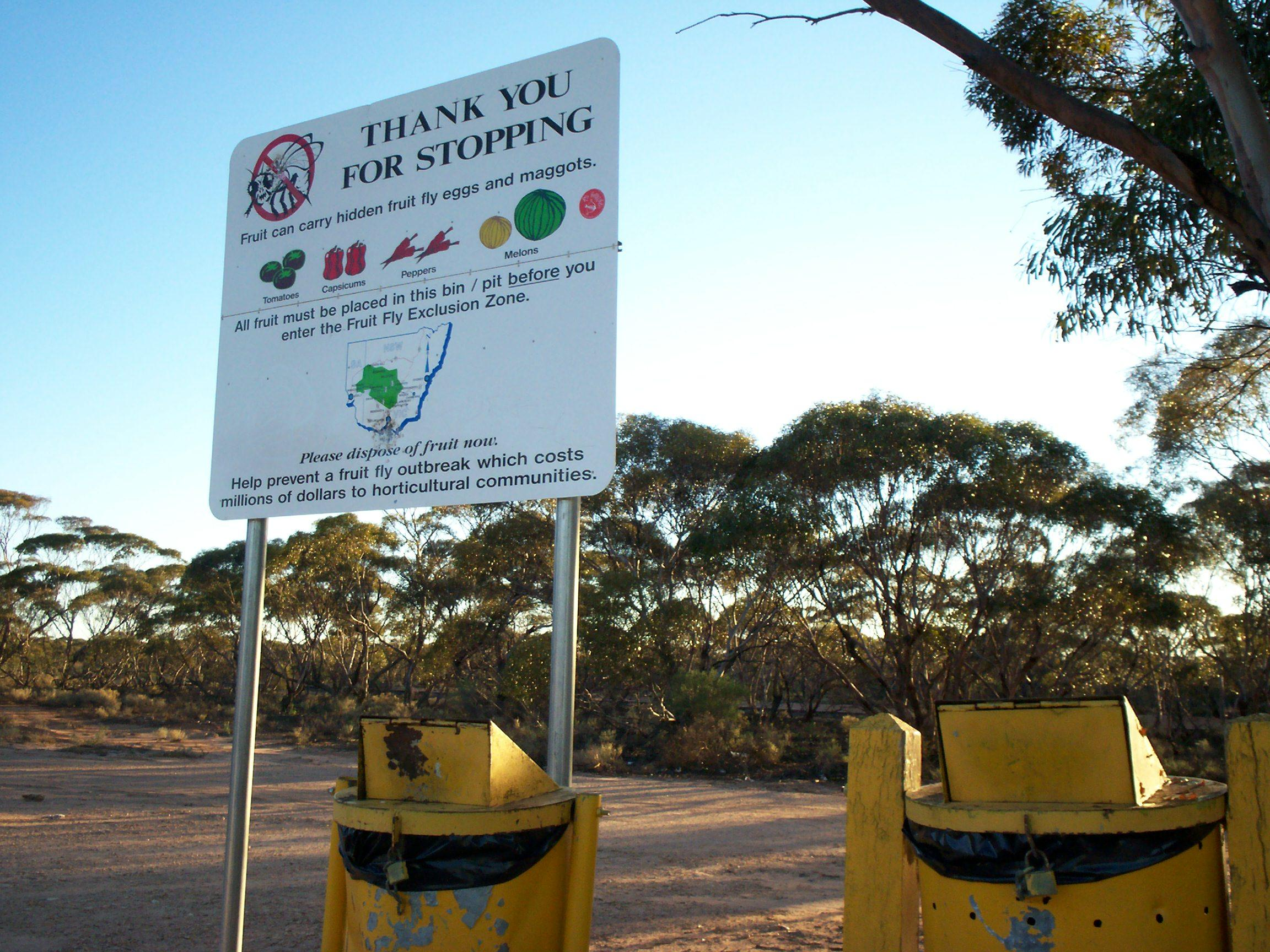
Fruit disposal bins and warning signs along the Calder Highway, approaching Mildura.

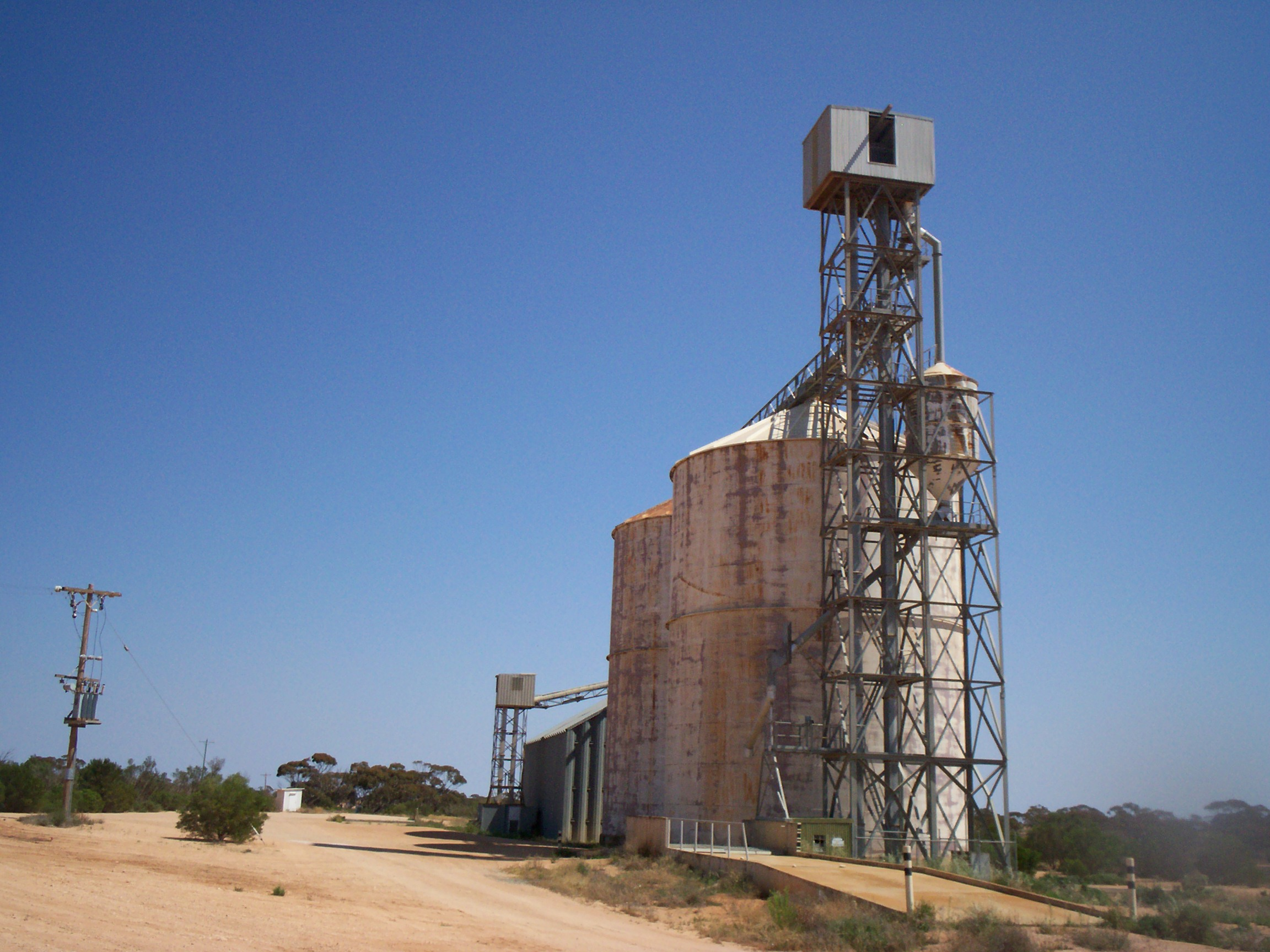
Storage silo at Merrinee, Victoria.

== See also ==
- Geography of Victoria
- Mallee
- Regions of Victoria
- Regions of New South Wales
- Riverina
