= Cardross (disambiguation) =

Cardross is a village in Argyll and Bute, Scotland.

Cardross may also refer to:

== Places ==
- Cardross, Victoria, Australia
  - Cardross Lakes, an irrigation drainage basin system near the town
- Cardross, Saskatchewan, Canada

== People ==
- John Erskine of Cardross (1662–1743), Scottish soldier and politician

== Other ==
- Cardross road crash, resulted in the deaths of six teenagers near Cardross, Victoria in 2006
