= Nichols Point =

- Town
- Coordinates: 34°12′50″S 142°11′10″E
- Country: Australia
- State: Victoria
- Region: Sunraysia
- LGA: Rural City of Mildura
- Location: 540 km (340 mi) from Melbourne; 4 km (2.5 mi) from Mildura; 98 km (61 mi) from Ouyen; 14 km (8.7 mi) from Red Cliffs

Government
  - State electorate: Mildura
  - Federal division: Mallee

Population
  - Total: 1,723 (2021 census)
- Postcode: 3501
- County: Karkarooc
Localities around Nichols Point
| Mildura | New South Wales | New South Wales |
| Mildura | Nichols Point | New South Wales |
| Irymple | Irymple | Irymple |

Nichols Point is a town in Victoria, Australia, located approximately 4 km from Mildura, Victoria. The Post Office opened on 8 April 1908 although known as Nicholl's Point until around 1949. The Post Office includes a small general store and bottle shop. In the 2021 census, Nichols Point had a population of 1,723.

The town has a Primary School with over 300 students. The Nichols Point School opened in May 1892, and classes were initially held in a "bough shelter" structure until the local Methodist Church was leased in July 1892 (on the corner of 5th Street and Koorlong Avenue). In 1907, the school moved into a brick building in Fifth Street. In 2007, a complete new school was opened in Koorlong Avenue.

The area is predominantly irrigated farmland.

Golfers play at the course of the Riverside Golf Club on Park Street.

Nearby is the Kings Billabong Wildlife Reserve, managed by Parks Victoria. Bordered by a wide stretch of the Murray River, home to majestic River Red Gums and a fantastic variety of birdlife, Kings Billabong Reserve is an ideal place to discover nature and history within minutes of Nichols Point and Mildura.

Nichols Point Reserve ground gets used all year round by multiple sporting clubs. Nichols Point Cricket Club (Summer), Nichols Point Soccer Club & Mildura Tigers Rugby Club (Winter). It also gets used by the Nichols Point Primary School during interschool competitions.
