= Abbotsford Bridge =

Bridge in New South Wales, Australia

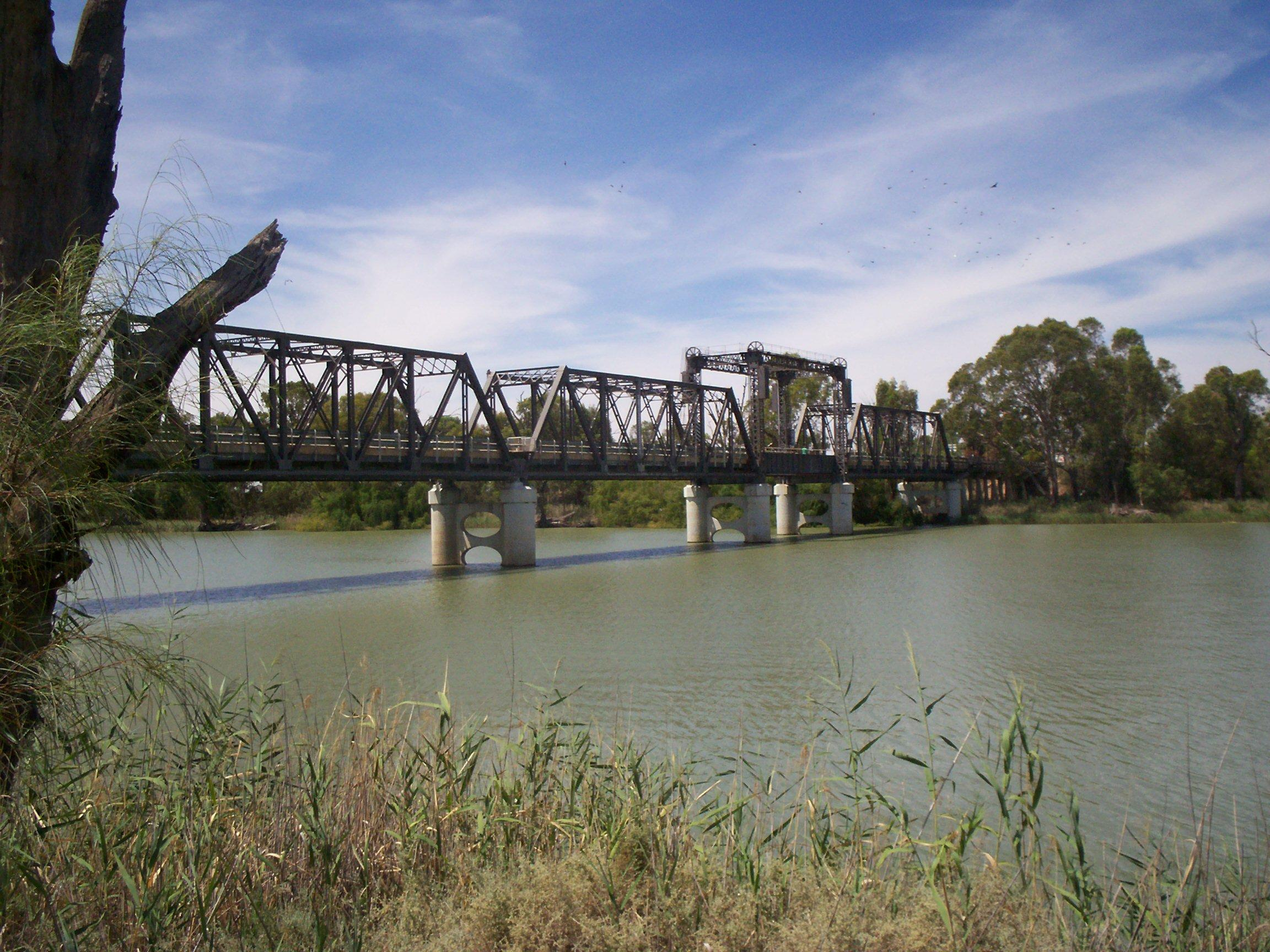
- Abbotsford Bridge from the Victorian riverbank
- Coordinates: 34°06′51″S 141°59′16″E
- Carries: Silver City Highway
- Crosses: Murray River
- Begins: Curlwaa, New South Wales
- Ends: Yelta, Victoria
- Owner: Transport for NSW
- Preceded by: George Chaffey Bridge
- Followed by: Paringa Bridge

Characteristics
- Design: Allan truss vertical-lift bridge
- Material: Steel
- Total length: 240 m (790 ft)
- Clearance below: 7.1 m (23.3 ft) (closed); 16.0 m (52.5 ft) (open)
- No. of lanes: One (controlled by traffic lights)

History
- Constructed by: NSW Department of Public Works
- Construction cost: A£78,000
- Opened: 14 April 1928
- Inaugurated: 28 July 1928
- Replaces: Abbot's Ford punt

Location
- Interactive map of Abbotsford Bridge

Abbotsford Bridge is a steel Allan truss-type road bridge that carries the Silver City Highway across the Murray River, between Curlwaa in New South Wales, and Yelta, Victoria in Australia. It is the only remaining steel truss bridge with a lift span that crosses the Murray. Opened in 1928, the bridge was built by the NSW Department of Public Works and was designed by Percy Allan. It was the second last vertical-lift bridge to be built over the river, the last being the Nyah Bridge, which opened in 1941.

The bridge was constructed over a three-year period from 1925. The project was not originally planned to take as long, but there were delays due to problems with a contractor, and industrial action. The bridge was designed to carry the Mildura railway line over the Murray River and into New South Wales, to service significant cross-border traffic arising from the fruit-growing industry, but the line was never extended beyond the terminus at Yelta. The bridge currently carries a single lane of road controlled by traffic lights.

In 1931, there was a major accident at the bridge when a paddle steamer clipped the lift span, tearing apart the upper deck of the boat.

== Description ==
Abbotsford Bridge is a steel Allan truss bridge that is about 240 m (790 ft) in length. The bridge also contains a single lift span about 20 m (66 ft) in length, which is still in working order. It is two lanes wide through most of its length, but the lift span is only capable of carrying a single lane. The entire bridge has been marked with a single lane and has traffic lights on both ends to control vehicular flow.

The bridge was completed in 1928 by the NSW Department of Public Works and, although opened as a traffic bridge, it was designed to carry the loads required for a railway, once the Mildura railway line had been extended over the bridge. The line was never extended beyond Yelta, where the terminus remains to this day. The location of the bridge was thought to be convenient, as it provided a link to the Sturt Highway without travelling farther upstream to Mildura. It is the only remaining steel truss bridge with a lift span on the Murray, although other lifting bridges still exist along the river. The bridge was built after the decline in commercial river traffic on the Murray. Due to its significance to the local area, it has been listed on the NSW State Heritage Register.

== History ==
The nearby town of Wentworth was an important river port from which wool was shipped to the coast, and as such there was a variety of traffic in the area. In the 1890s, irrigated farming greatly expanded in Sunraysia region which is known for its fruit production, and traffic volumes increased further. It was decided to install a punt at this location (then known as Abbot's Ford).

New South Wales and Victoria had signed an agreement towards constructing bridges for railways over the Murray to serve the settlements on the northern side. In 1923, a report was released that recommended going ahead with the building of four bridges, one of those being the future Abbotsford Bridge. It was said a bridge in this area would benefit Curlwaa, Wentworth, and a proposed irrigation scheme to the north. The cost was estimated at £78,000. It had been considered that it might be appropriate to combine these four bridges with locks, but this idea was rejected due to siting concerns.

In 1924, residents of nearby settlements urged construction of the railway line to the proposed bridge site, but they were told this extension of the line was to be delayed. Within that year it was decided that a bridge was to be constructed due to increased traffic volume, and tenders were let for manufacture of the bridge spans, construction of abutments and piles, and transport of materials to the future construction site.

Early in 1925, a foundation pile and some tents could be found at the site of the future bridge. Men in the region were also awaiting employment on the structure, and by the middle of the year unemployment problems were becoming a serious issue. Similarly government debt was increasing, although it was still expected the railway line to Abbotsford Bridge would be completed. In November, construction started and it was expected that the bridge would be opened around 25 September the following year.

During May 1926, the approach road between Wentworth and the bridge was being progressively metalled, but could not be completed in its entirety until construction of the bridge itself was complete. In June, construction was halted due to contract requirements not being met.

By February the next year, construction had resumed. On 8 April 25 men working on the bridge went on strike. This was of concern due to time dependent concreting being undertaken at that time. As the construction was considered unemployment relief, the constructing authority began to look for men who would do the work in their places. By 13 April, further details had emerged; the number of the men on strike was actually 32, and it had been caused by the alleged wrongful dismissal of three men who had left for their lunch break early. The strike continued until at least 21 April. Work had resumed by early May, and the bridge was reported as being a little over half completed at that time.

It was reported in mid-May that construction work was in progress on the last two piers of the bridge, though low river levels meant that staging could not be installed to allow further work on the bridge framework. The estimated time of completion at this point was by the end of the year. It was noted in early September that the extension of the railway from Yelta was expected to occur once the bridge was completed.

The bridge was still under construction in January 1928, and at that time the estimated date of completion was only a month away. The bridge finally opened to traffic on 14 April. The official opening of the bridge by the Governor of New South Wales Dudley de Chair occurred on 10 July, and was celebrated by the cutting of the ribbon and an opening of the gates at each end of the lift span. In return he was presented with a silver cigarette case.

A major accident occurred at the bridge in August 1931. The paddle steamer E.R.O. struck the lift span of the bridge. The span had not been raised to a high enough level, causing it to clip the top of the steamer's funnel and rip apart the upper deck. High pressure steam was released during the accident causing some onlookers to believe the boat was on fire. It was at first thought the captain would be found amongst the wreckage of the upper deck, but he had been navigating the boat from the lower deck at that time. The captain displayed considerable skill; he immediately realised that further raising of the span despite being given the all clear meant it was not quite high enough. And through his actions as the boat progressed downstream caught in the current, he prevented the boat becoming stuck at the bridge.

Much like in its early days, the bridge still carries a lot of traffic related to the fruit production industry, especially during picking and harvesting seasons. Bridge lifts are timed to try to avoid traffic delays. Some in the local community consider that the capacity of the bridge is inadequate and impedes commercial activity.

Next crossing upstream	Murray River	Next crossing downstream
George Chaffey Bridge	Abbotsford Bridge	Paringa Bridge
