= George Chaffey Bridge =

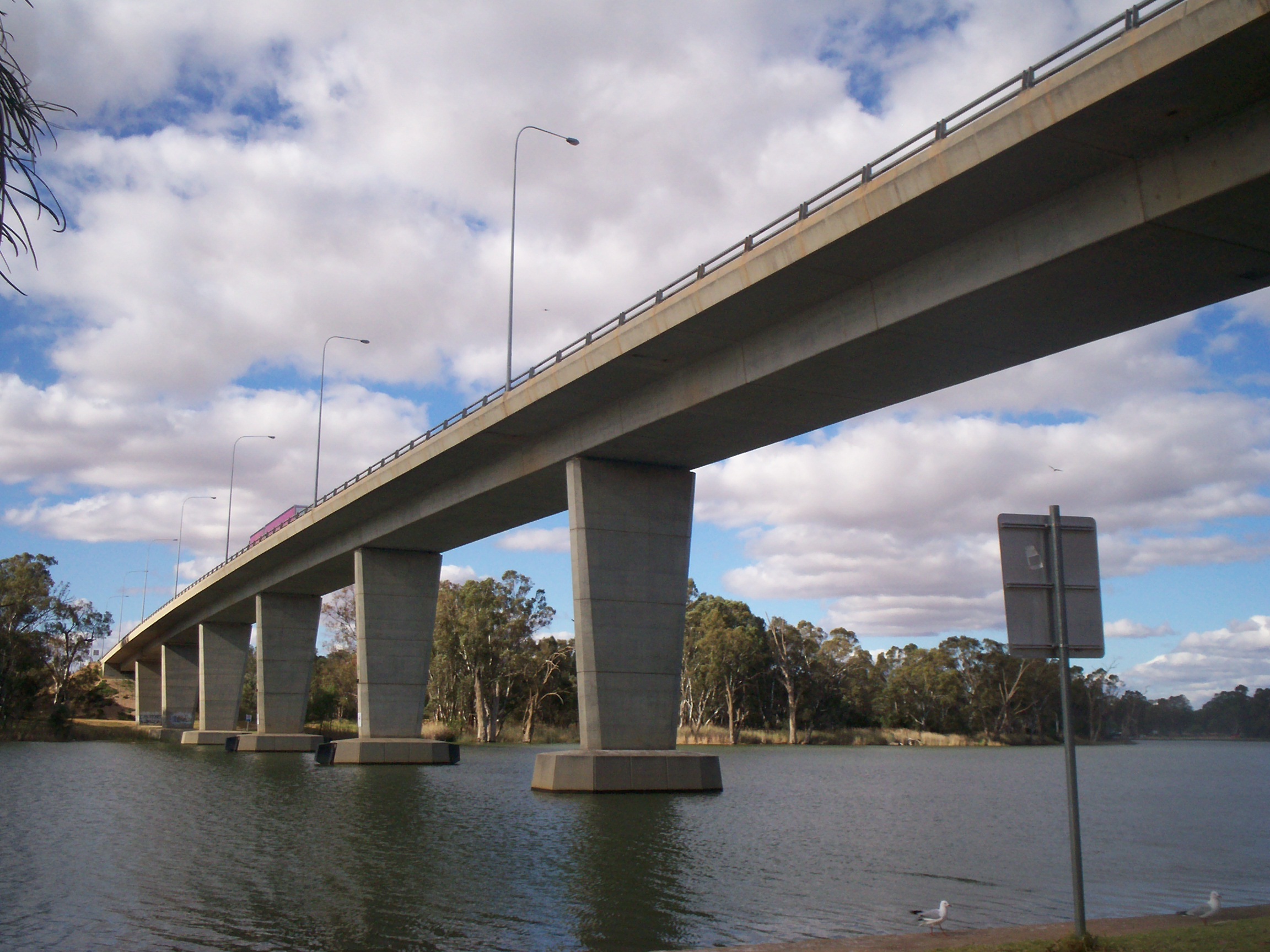
- George Chaffey Bridge from Mildura in 2007
- Coordinates: 34°11′3″S 142°10′23″E
- Carries: Sturt Highway
- Crosses: Murray River
- Begins: Buronga, New South Wales
- Ends: Mildura, Victoria
- Named for: George Chaffey
- Owner: Transport for NSW
- Preceded by: Robinvale Bridge
- Followed by: Abbotsford Bridge

Characteristics
- Material: Concrete
- Total length: 331 metres (1,086 ft)
- Width: 9.8 metres (32 ft)
- No. of spans: 9
- Piers in water: 5

History
- Opened: 12 March 1985
- Replaces: Mildura Bridge (1927–1985)

Location
- Interactive map of George Chaffey Bridge

The George Chaffey Bridge is a road bridge in Australia that carries the Sturt Highway across the Murray River from Buronga to Mildura.

== History ==
=== Old Mildura Bridge ===
The previous Mildura Bridge was opened on 22 October 1927. The design allowed for it to carry both road and railway traffic, but railway tracks were never laid. It was a lift-span bridge supported by concrete pylons, with two approach spans on each side. Two of the truss spans and the lift span are now in the Mildura Marina.

=== Current bridge ===
Named in honour of engineer George Chaffey, the current bridge was opened on 12 March 1985, by Federal, New South Wales and Victorian transport ministers Peter Morris, Laurie Brereton and Steve Crabb. The project was funded under the Australian Bicentennial Road Development Programme, constructed at a cost of $14 million.

The nine-span, 331 metres (1,086 ft) long and 9.8 metres (32 ft) wide, prestressed concrete bridge was designed and constructed by the Department of Main Roads. The Victorian approach is 500 metres (1,600 ft) long, with a six-span, high-strength reinforced concrete I-beam floodway bridge, 80.4 metres (264 ft) long. The New South Wales approach to the main bridge crossing is 1.3 kilometres (0.81 mi) long, and includes three floodway bridges.

== See also ==
- List of bridges in Australia
- List of crossings of the Murray River

Next bridge upstream	Murray River	Next bridge downstream
Robinvale Bridge	George Chaffey Bridge	Abbotsford Bridge
