= Curlwaa, New South Wales =

Curlwaa
- Town
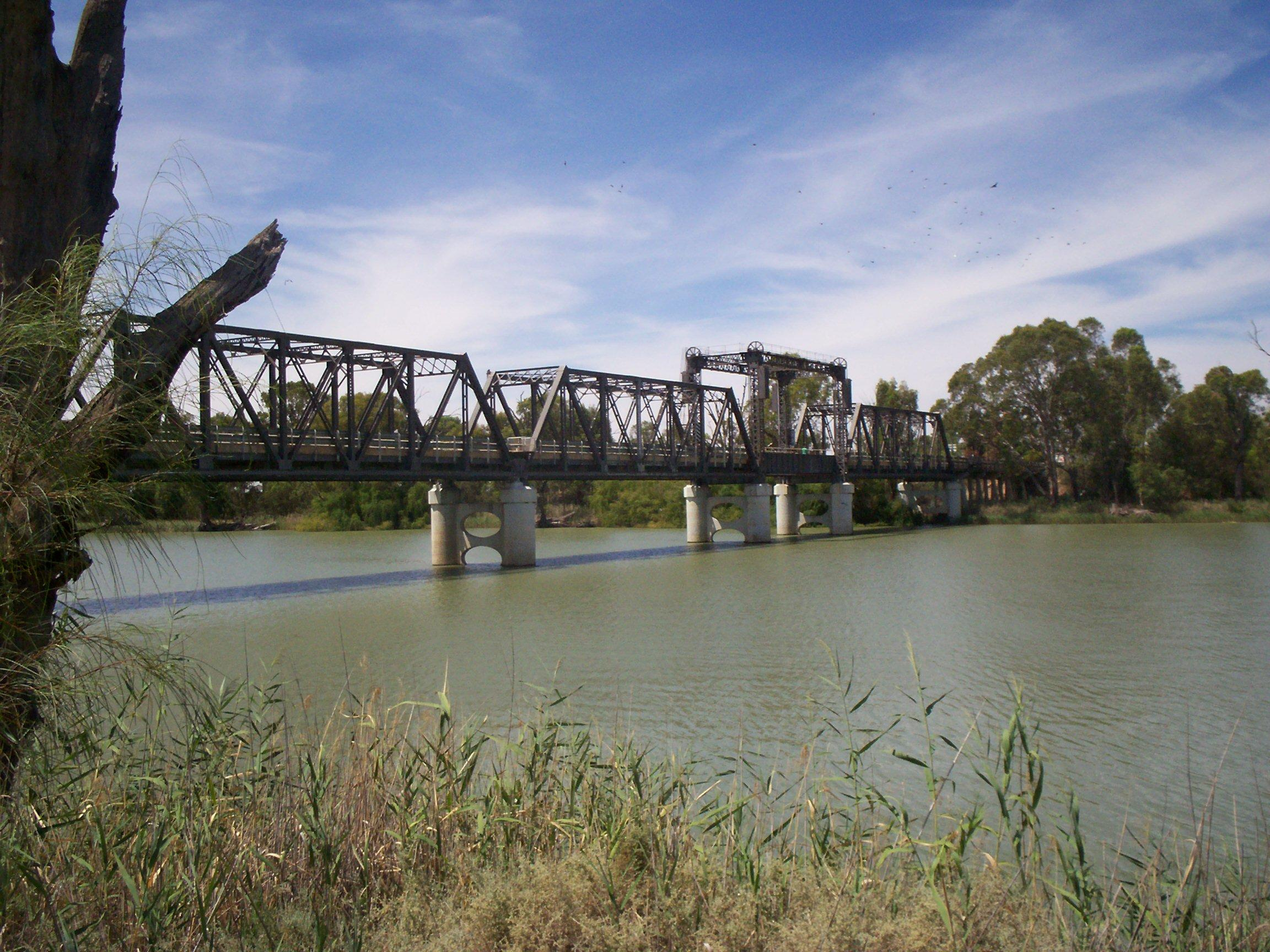
- Abbotsford Bridge

- Coordinates: 34°06′S 141°58′E
- Country: Australia
- State: New South Wales
- LGA: Wentworth Shire
- Location: 4 km (2.5 mi) east of Wentworth

Government
  - State electorate: Murray
  - Federal division: Farrer

Population
  - Total: 393 (2016 census)
- Postcode: 2648

Curlwaa is a small locality on the New South Wales side of the Murray River. It also hosts the historical Abbotsford Bridge, and has the Silver City Highway and Calder Highway along it. Its great access to the Calder Hwy makes it easy to reach from the Victorian city of Mildura.

== Overview ==
Curlwaa is an irrigation settlement a few kilometres upstream of Wentworth on the Murray River in far southwestern New South Wales. It is the first Government irrigation scheme in New South Wales, established in 1890.

== Abbotsford Bridge ==
The Abbotsford Bridge spans the Murray River between Yelta, Victoria and Curlwaa, New South Wales. It is the northernmost point to cross the River as well as the final crossing point before the South Australia border, approximately 109 kilometers (67 miles) to the west. The name, Abbotsford, is derived from the punt service that previously operated at the site of the bridge. This was known as Abbot's Ford. Over time, this area of the river northwest of Merbein became known as Abbotsford.

The bridge was opened on 10 July 1928 by the Admiral Sir Dudley de Chair KCB KBE MVO, Governor of New South Wales.
