= Cardross, Victoria =

Cardross
- Town
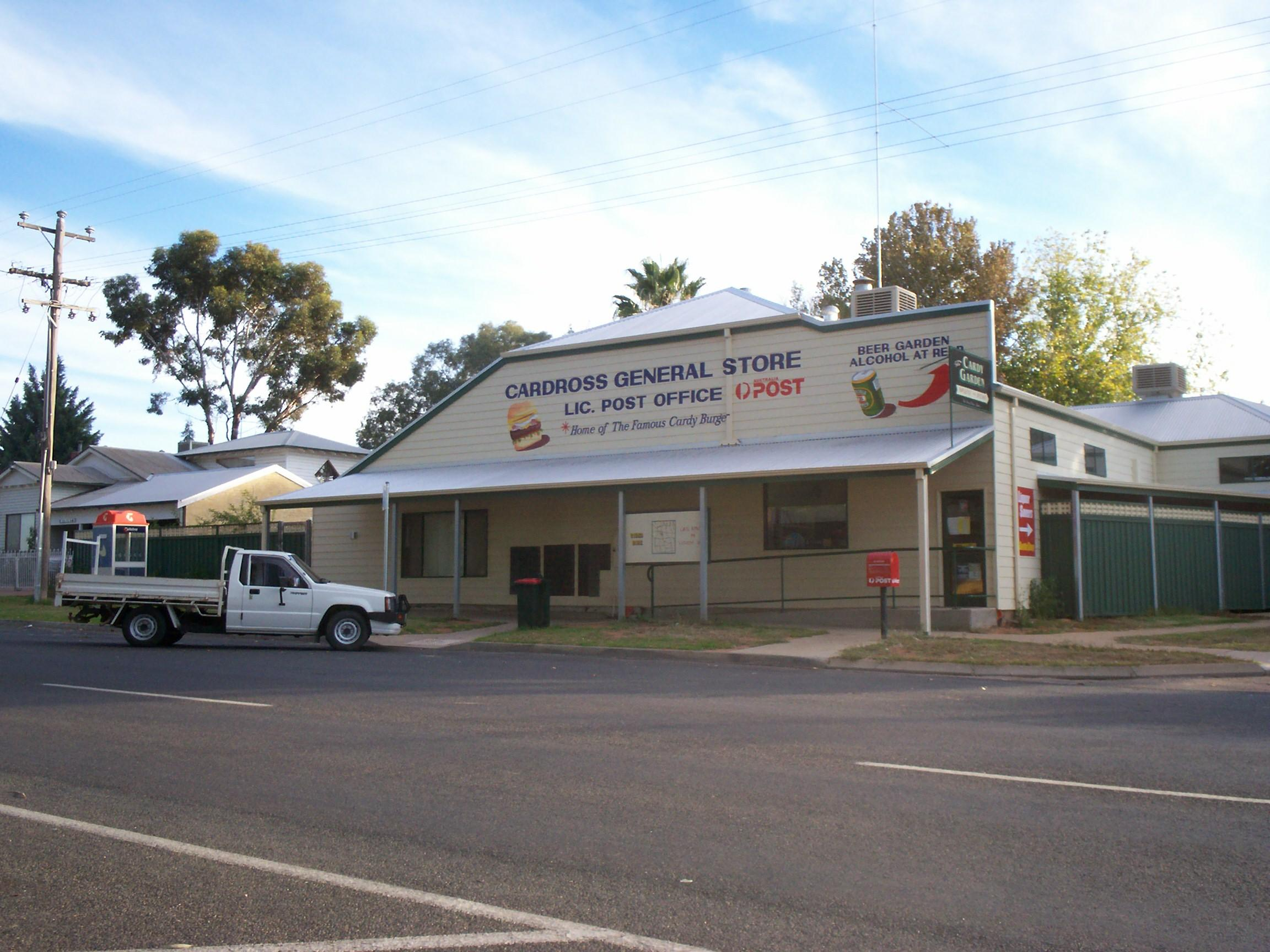
- Cardross General Store

- Coordinates: 34°18′23″S 142°07′33″E
- Country: Australia
- State: Victoria
- Region: Sunraysia
- LGA: Rural City of Mildura
- Location: 533 km (331 mi) NW of Melbourne; 15 km (9.3 mi) S of Mildura; 9 km (5.6 mi) S of Irymple; 7 km (4.3 mi) W of Red Cliffs

Government
  - State electorate: Mildura
  - Federal division: Division of Mallee

Population
  - Total: 847 (2021 census)
- Postcode: 3496
Localities around Cardross
| Koorlong | Irymple | Irymple |
| Koorlong | Cardross | Red Cliffs |
| Koorlong | Red Cliffs | Red Cliffs |

Cardross is a town approximately 15 km south east of Mildura, in north western Victoria, Australia. At the 2021 census, Cardross and the surrounding area had a population of 847. It was the site of a road fatality in February 2006, in which six teenagers were killed in a hit-run crash.

Cardross named after the Scottish village was established as a farming community in the 1920s, the Post Office opening on 15 June 1925.

Cardross has an Australian Rules football team competing in the Millewa Football League.

Cardross Lakes are southwest of the township.

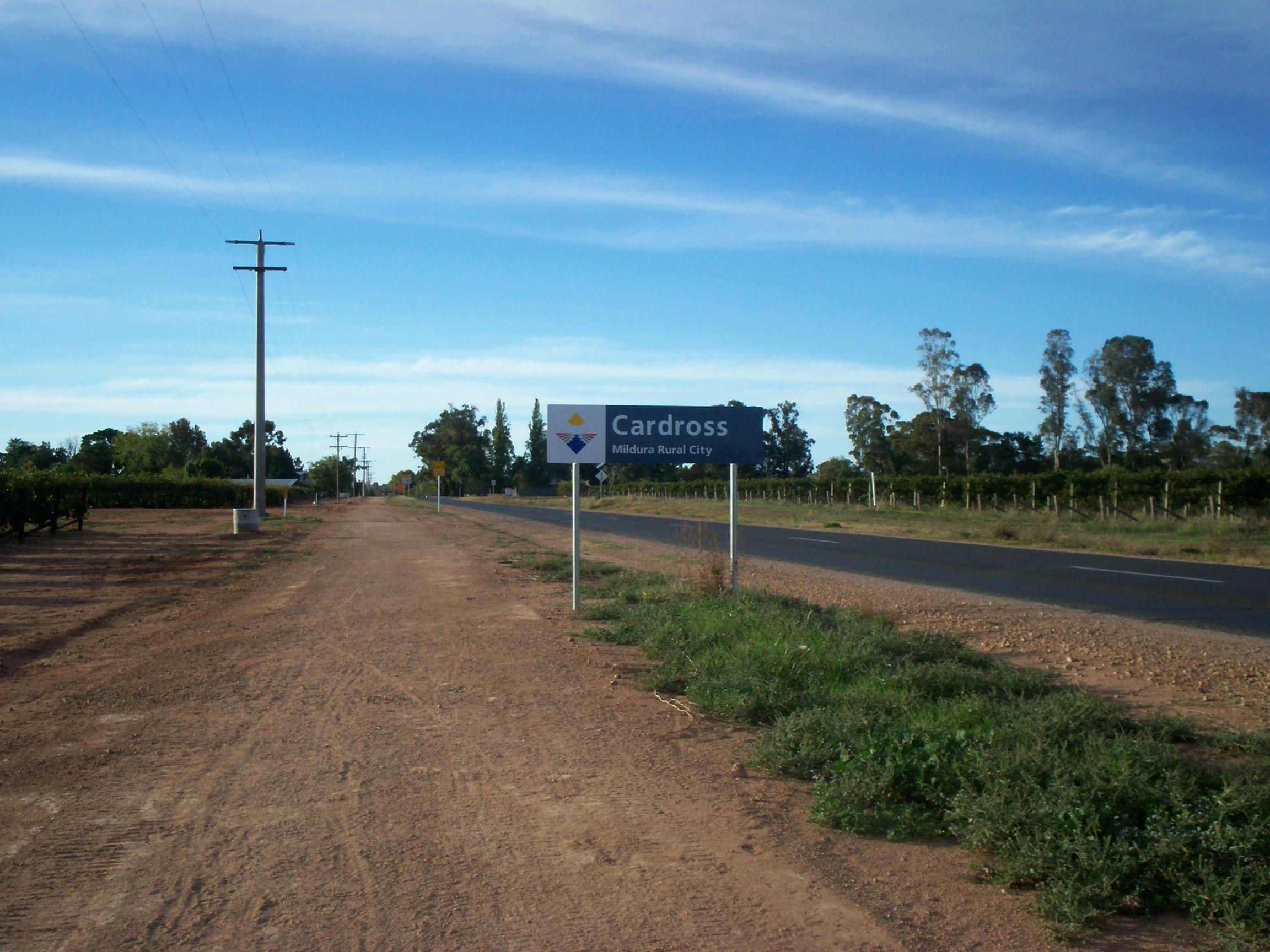
Entering Cardross
