= Koorlong =

- Town
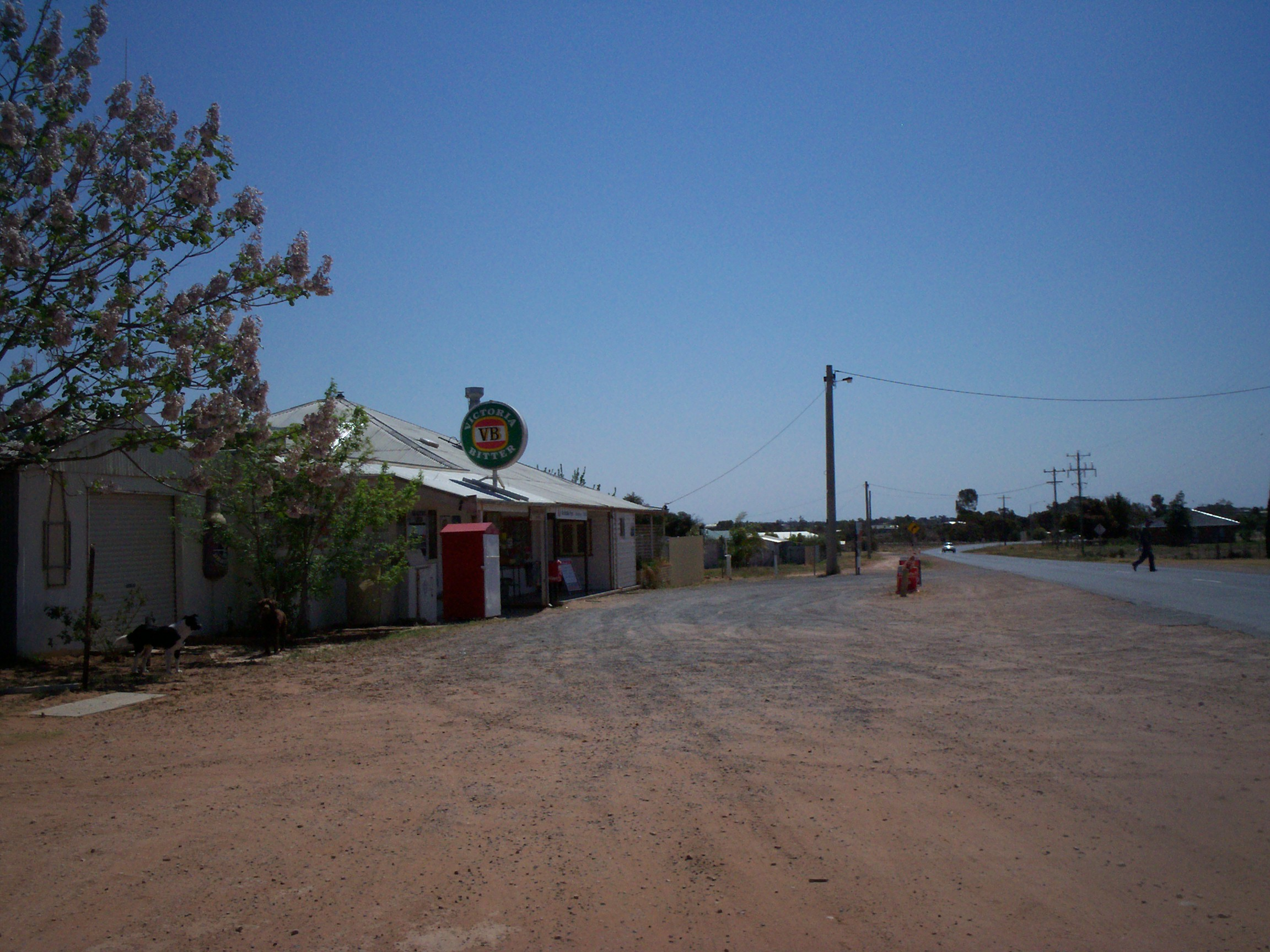
- Store at Koorlong

- Coordinates: 34°17′S 142°05′E
- Country: Australia
- State: Victoria
- Region: Sunraysia
- LGA: Rural City of Mildura
- Location: 15 km (9.3 mi) from Mildura; 539 km (335 mi) from Melbourne; 53 km (33 mi) from Werrimull

Government
  - State electorate: Mildura
  - Federal division: Mallee

Population
  - Total: 397 (2021 census)
- Postcode: 3501
Localities around Koorlong
Merbein South	Birdwoodton	Mildura
Merrinee	Koorlong	Irymple, Cardross
Merrinee	Carwarp	Red Cliffs

Koorlong is a locality in Victoria, Australia, located approximately 15 km south west of Mildura. At the 2021 census, Koorlong had a population of 397.

Located in Koorlong is the 1/8-mile Sunset Strip dragstrip, the Jambaroo Park motorcycle sports complex and the Koorlong Primary School. The Post Office opened on 1 January 1912 and continues to operate alongside Koorlong Store.

== 1943 mid-air collision ==
On 21 January 1943, two RAAF Wirraway trainers collided over the town. Three crew members were killed, with only the instructor of one aircraft surviving.
