= Irymple, Victoria =

Irymple
- Town
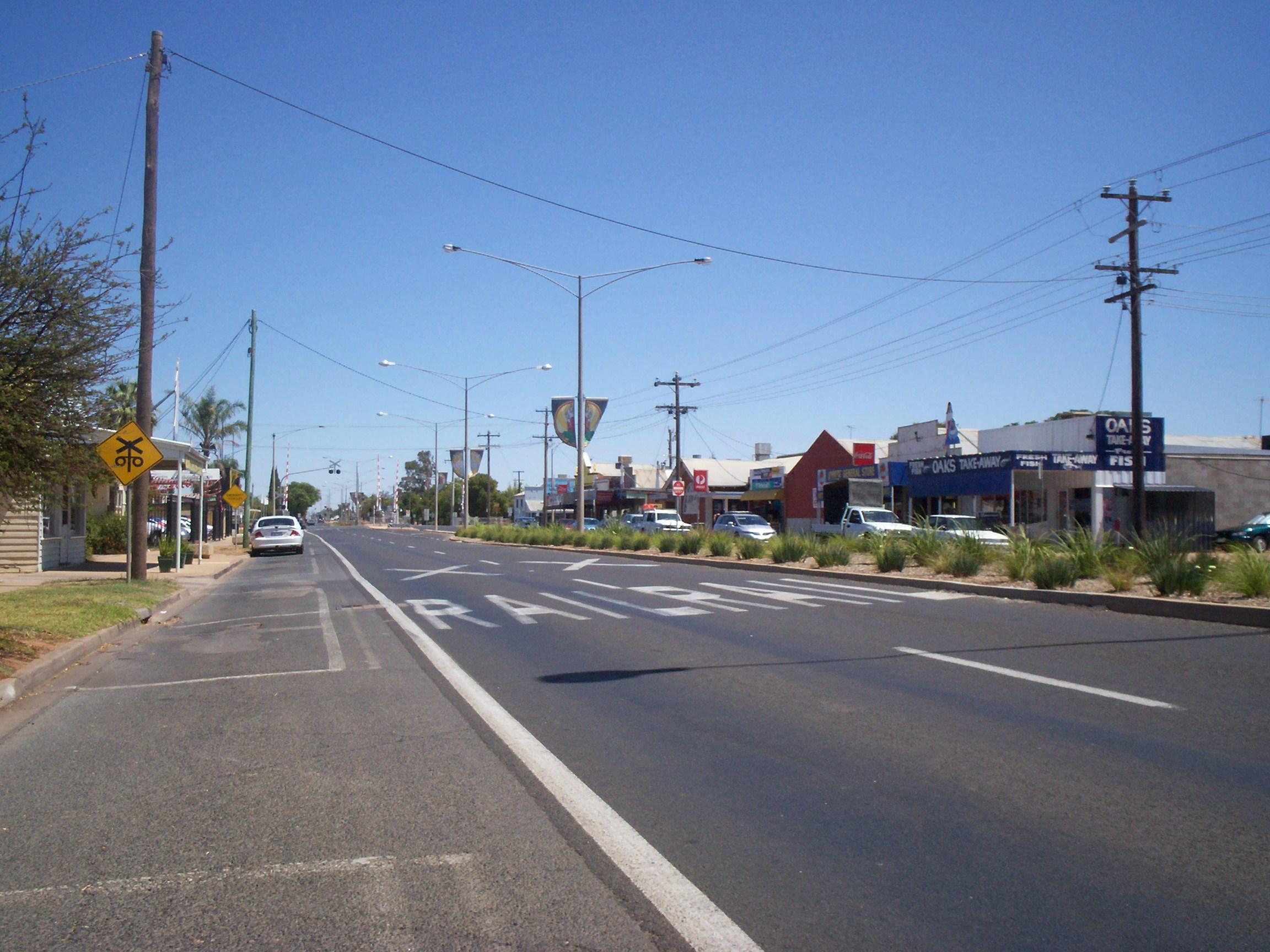
- The Calder Highway, passing through Irymple. Approaching the level crossing on the Mildura Line.

- Interactive map of Irymple
- Coordinates: 34°14′0″S 142°10′0″E
- Country: Australia
- State: Victoria
- Region: Sunraysia
- LGA: Rural City of Mildura
- Location: 535 km (332 mi) NW of Melbourne; 6 km (3.7 mi) S of Mildura

Government
  - State electorate: Mildura
  - Federal division: Mallee
- Elevation: 50 m (160 ft)

Population
  - Total: 5,977 (2021 census)
- Postcode: 3498
Localities around Irymple
Mildura	Mildura	Nichols Point
Mildura	Irymple	New South Wales
Koorlong	Cardross	Red Cliffs

Irymple (/ˈaɪərɪmpəl/ EYE-rim-pəl) is a suburb of Mildura in the state of Victoria in Australia. Located in the region of Sunraysia in the far North-West Victoria, Irymple is 6 km south of Mildura and 550 km northwest of Melbourne. At the 2021 census, Irymple and the surrounding area had a population of 5,977.

The township was established soon after Mildura, the Post Office opening on 17 February 1892.

== Features ==
The township has one kindergarten (Irymple Kindergarten), two primary schools (Irymple Primary School and Irymple South Primary School), one secondary school (Irymple Secondary College, years 7–10) and two P-10 schools (the Baptist Mildura Christian College and the Adventist Henderson College).

Irymple has a football and netball club competing in the Sunraysia Football Netball League, a soccer club, a lawn bowls club, a bocce club, a swimming club and a basketball association, all of which have home grounds located in the township. During 2017, Irymple Football and Netball Club won 4 of the 6 possible grand finals in the Sunraysia Football Netball League.
