= Cardross road crash =

2006 hit and run in Victoria, Australia

Victims of the Cardross crash, from top left to right, Shane Hirst, 16; Abby Hirst, 17; Cassandra Manners, 16; Stevie-Lee Weight, 15; Cory Dowling, 16; Josephine Calvi, 16.

The Cardross road crash was a hit and run crash at Cardross, Victoria, Australia at 9:50 p.m. on 18 February 2006, where the driver of a Ford EA Falcon station wagon struck a group of thirteen teenage pedestrians, killing five immediately and injuring eight more. The teenagers were walking along Myall Street, Cardross to a party in nearby Red Cliffs after being dropped by a taxi driver at an incorrect address.

Cassandra Manners, 16, Stevie-Lee Weight, 15, Cory Dowling, 16, Abby Hirst, 17 and her 16-year-old brother Shane Hirst all died at the scene. Josephine Calvi, 16, died the following day at the Royal Adelaide Hospital.

On 20 February 2006, Thomas Graham Towle, an unemployed 35-year-old father of six from Red Cliffs, appeared in the Mildura Magistrates Court facing 17 charges, including six of culpable driving, five of negligently causing serious injury and one of failing to stop after a collision. On 31 March 2008, Towle was found guilty in the Supreme Court of Victoria and sentenced to 10 years jail with a minimum of seven years, of which he had already served two years. He completed his sentence on 16 May 2016.

== Aftermath ==
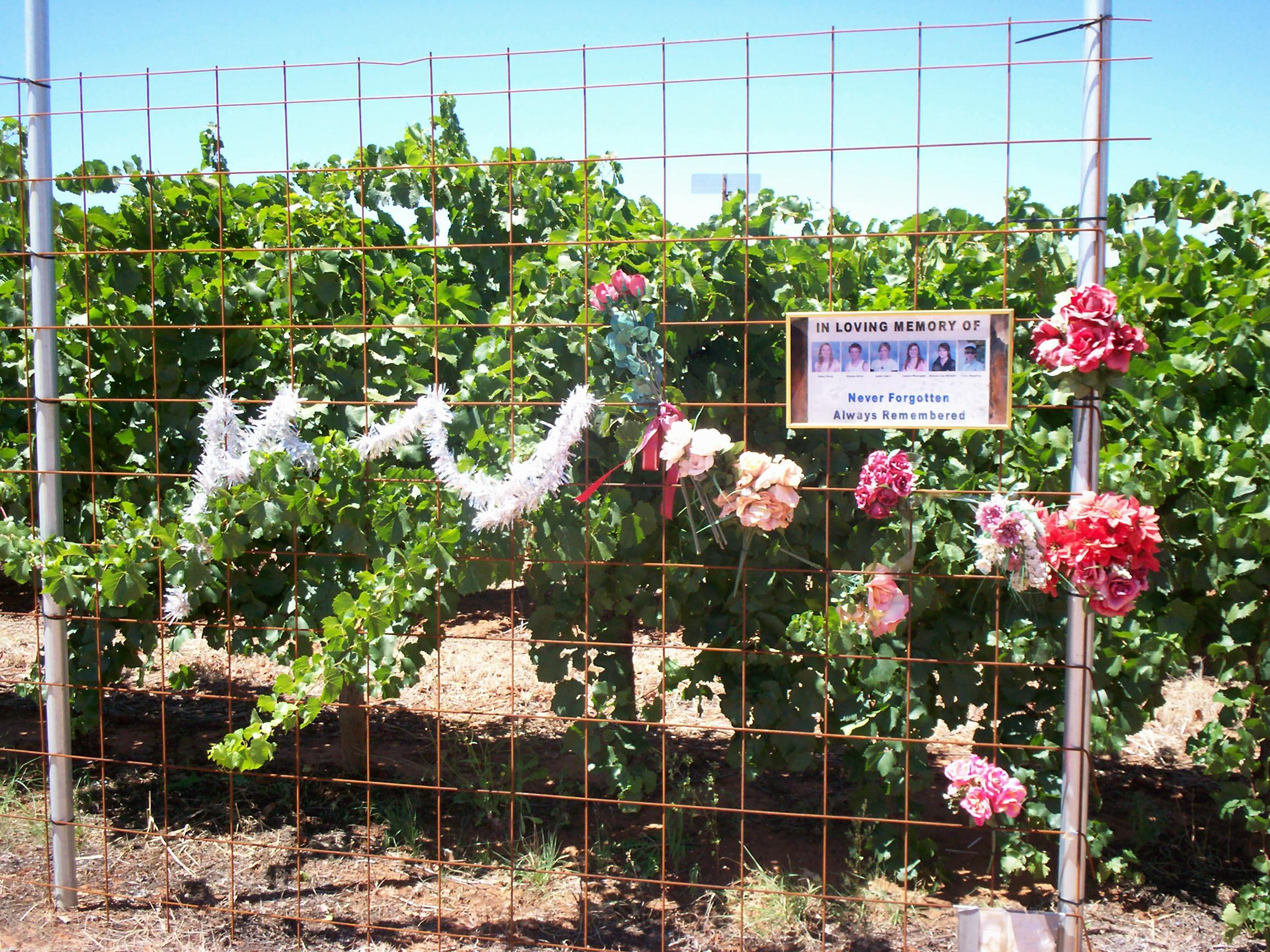
Temporary roadside memorial in Myall St, Cardross

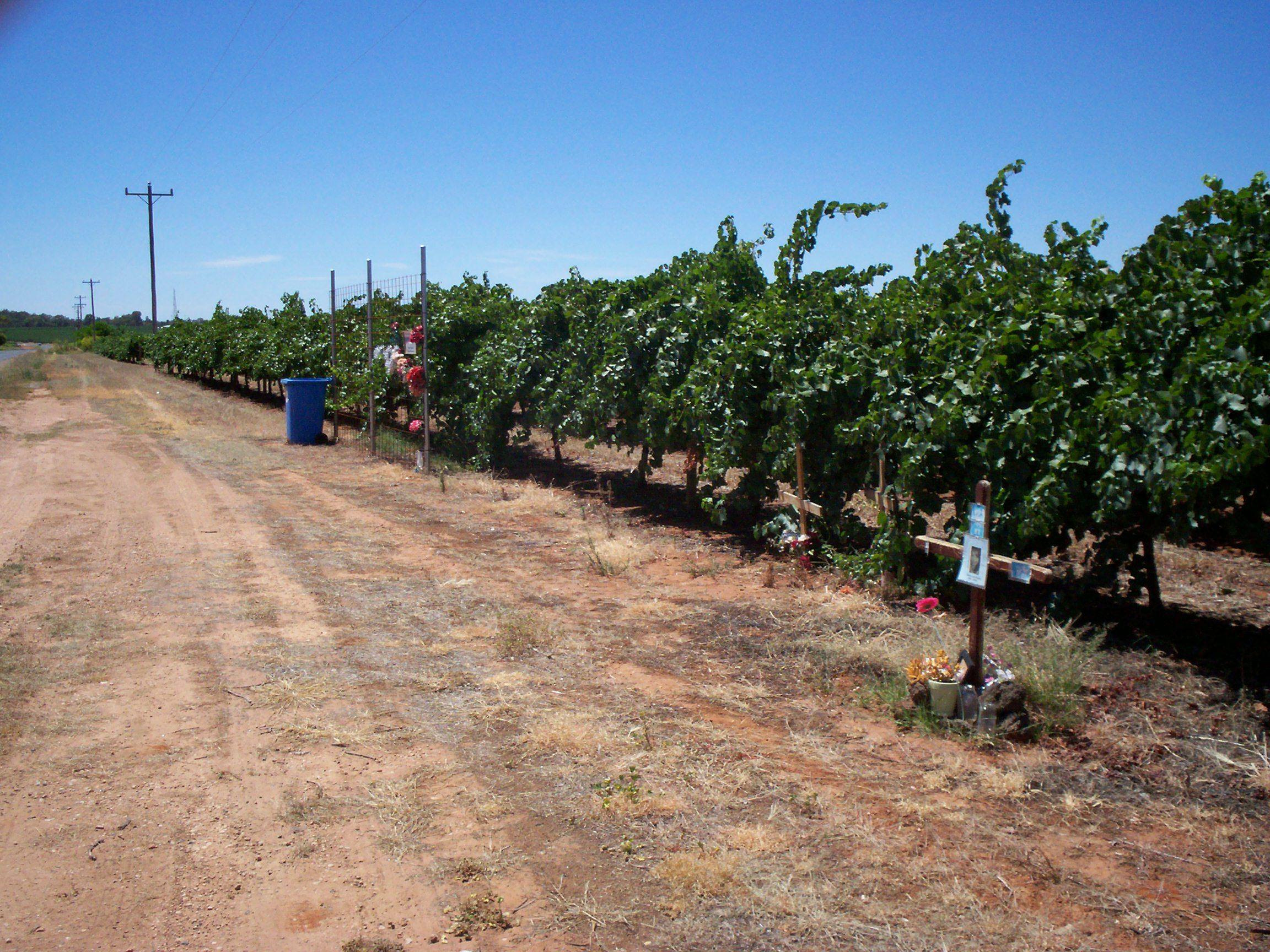
Roadside memorials

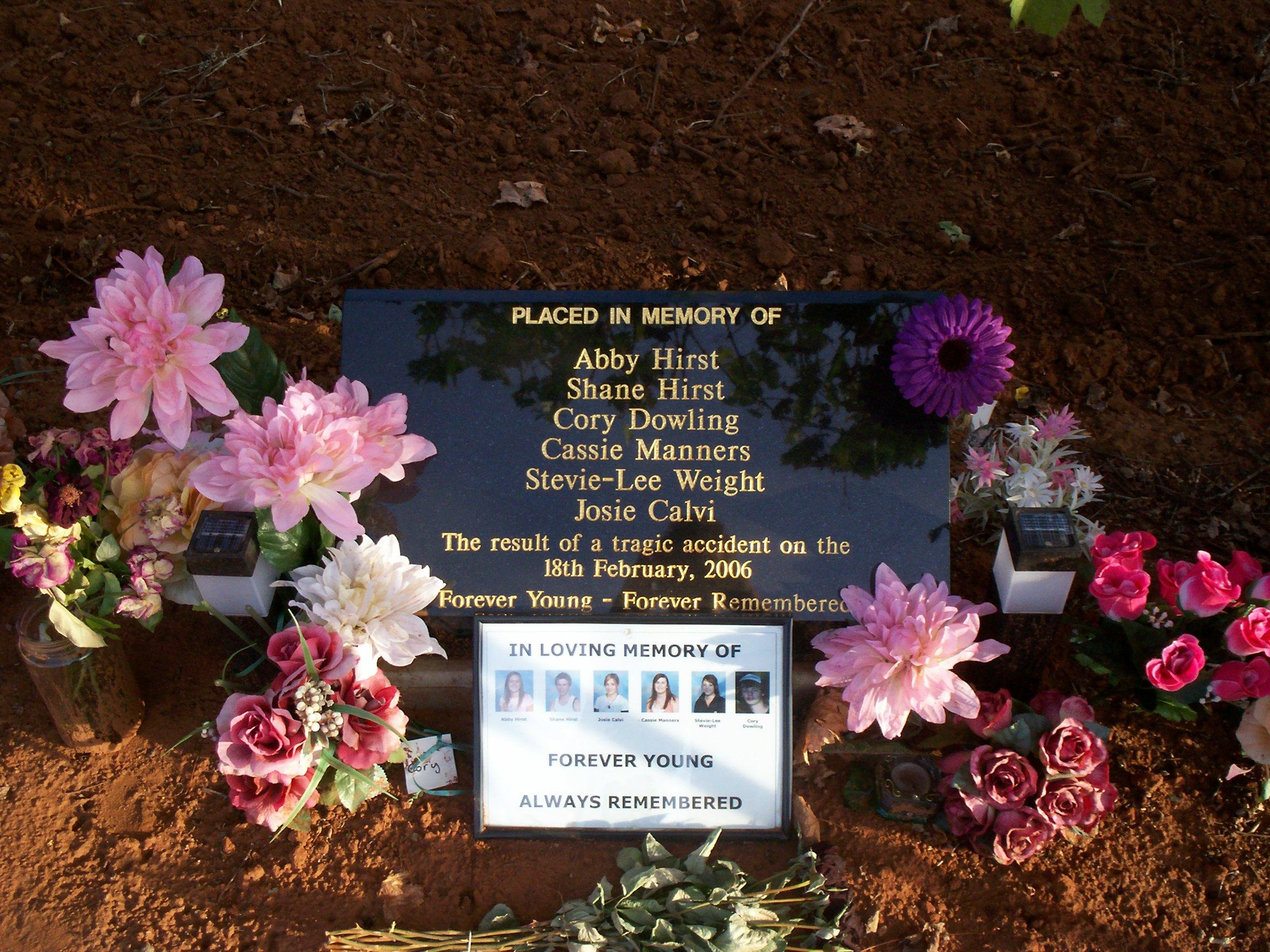
Permanent roadside memorial

Peter Gallagher, a family member of victim Cory Dowling, read a statement on behalf of the victims' families to a crowd of over 600 mourners gathered on the lawns at the Mildura Base Hospital on the night of the crash,

"We are now aware that we have lost our beautiful children overnight. In a moment of time, our lives have been changed forever. No words can describe what we are and will be going through.

The Government of Victoria announced it would provide A$40,000 for counselling of victims and relatives.

Prime Minister, John Howard, then issued a statement,

"It is just such a tragic loss of young lives. It is heartbreaking. Young kids out on a Saturday night to enjoy themselves and something like this happens. I, like all other Australians, (am) dreadfully sorry. I can't do more than express my profound sympathy and condolences to those who have lost their children and their friends in this terrible accident."

Michael Jeffery, the Governor-General of Australia, also sent a message of condolence to the Mildura community, which he had visited during 2005.

Two minutes silence was observed at the Lock Rock Music Festival held in Mildura a week after the crash, on 25 February 2006. The festival was hosted by radio announcer and former Red Cliffs resident, Myf Warhurst.

Towle's family, including his children, reported receiving threats from members of the community, forcing police to make an announcement appealing for calm. Acting Inspector Michael Talbot of the Major Collision Investigation Unit was quoted as saying,

"Creating more tensions is not going to help them. It's not going to help their families come to grips with what has happened. We, as the community, the police, the people of Mildura, all need to work together to keep calm on this and ensure that everything's done smoothly, properly and there's no trouble caused."

The father of the accused, Graham Towle, offered his condolences, saying

"... with pain and tears, I want everyone to know I feel so sorry for the families and friends of the grieving and dreadful loss that has happened. The community has rallied around all concerned and I, as the father and grandfather, publicly thank them for their kindness and words of compassion."

On 18 February 2007, a memorial service was held at Mildura's Henderson Park to mark the first anniversary of the crash. A permanent roadside memorial was erected at the scene of the crash in early 2007.

== Committal hearing ==
A committal hearing began in Mildura before Magistrate Donna Bakos on 19 March 2007. A total of 42 witnesses, including 28 children, were called during the two-week hearing. Towle was not required to attend the committal hearing due to concerns for his safety, and appeared briefly via video link at the beginning of committal proceedings.

It was alleged Towle drank bourbon whiskey mixed with Coca-Cola earlier in the day and allowed his four-year-old child to sit on his lap while driving at speeds of up to 150 kilometres per hour (93 mph) shortly before the crash occurred. Witness Matthew Orsini denied the group had been walking on the road.

Towle told police he was travelling at approximately 90 kilometres per hour (56 mph), and that the corner "just jumped out at him".

"By the time I was at the corner, it was pretty sharp, I put me foot on the brake and lost control of the car and then it went sideways into a group of people ... so close to the road."

Towle described the scene to police as "absolute horror".

"People laying down were saying, 'please help me'. I went over to one lady who was unconscious and said are you all right and someone said 'you just get away from them', then I thought with the other fellas on the road, you know, I better get out of here. There was two cars that had pulled up so I knew that there was help on its way, I just didn’t leave them stranded."

Towle fled the scene, leaving his four-year-old son and ten-year-old daughter behind. He telephoned police to notify them of his whereabouts five hours after the crash. Andrew Arden, a teenager present at the crash scene, denied threatening to kill Towle immediately after the crash, but admitted during committal hearing proceedings that he yelled at Towle, saying, "You f****n' bastard, what have you done?" and then threw a beer bottle at him.

Towle was reported to be hysterical and suicidal in the hours following the crash. On advice from his lawyer, Towle also refused to provide a blood sample to police. Towle later told police:

"I don't believe I did – I did anything wrong. It was a complete accident ... no driver in the world would have been able to control that corner, not even Michael Schumacher ... unless there were was a speed sign saying to slow down as the corner was approaching."

Defence lawyer for Towle, Brendan Murphy, QC said the legal rights of his client had been damaged, saying,

"It will be demonstrated throughout this committal that there has been carried out by Victorian police investigators a sanitisation of statements of witnesses and as a result there has been an exclusion of important factors and this could have the result of depriving the defendant in this case a fair go."

The vehicle allegedly involved in the crash was sent to Japan for scrap metal without the consent of the defendants' defence team. ABC TV's Media Watch highlighted a front page article in The Age newspaper where previous court attendances of the defendant were listed, an action Media Watch suggests could influence a jury.

On 27 March 2007, Magistrate Donna Bakos ordered Towle to stand trial in the Supreme Court of Victoria, and to appear for a directions hearing in the Supreme Court on 5 June 2007. Towle was formally refused bail, with Magistrate Bakos saying he was an unacceptable risk of fleeing.

== Trial ==
The trial of Thomas Graham Towle began on 4 February 2008 before the Supreme Court. On 31 March 2008, he was found guilty and sentenced to 10 years in prison, with a minimum non-parole period of seven years (of which Towle had already served two years on remand). Towle subsequently appealed the sentence, but the original judgement was upheld.

Towle was freed on parole in June 2013.

In September 2015, Towle was returned to jail after the Adult Parole Board cancelled his parole amid fears of an "escalation of risk to the community." It did not reveal how he had breached the conditions of his parole. He completed his sentence and was released on 16 May 2016.

== See also ==
- Lists of traffic collisions
- List of disasters in Australia by death toll
