= Cardross Lakes =

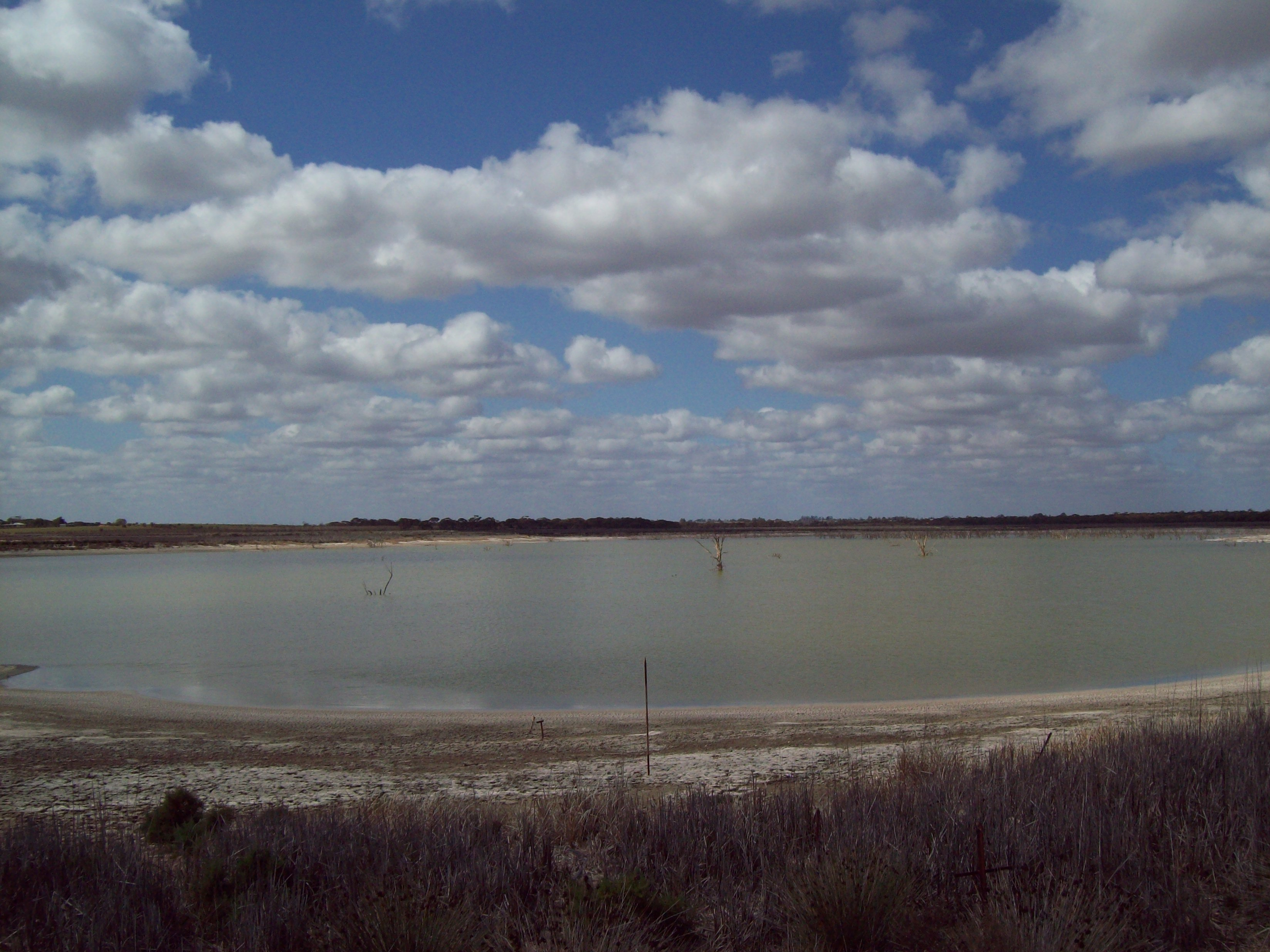
- Cardross Lakes, September 2008

- Location in Victoria
- Location: Mallee, Victoria
- Coordinates: 34°18′S 142°05′E
- Lake type: Artificial lake
- Basin countries: Australia
- Surface area: 360 ha (890 acres)

The Cardross Lakes are an irrigation drainage basin system located approximately 15 kilometres (9.3 mi) south-west of Mildura, in the Mallee region of Victoria, Australia. The lakes are notable for being the only known occurrence within Victoria of the Southern Purple Spotted Gudgeon (Mogurnda adspersa), discovered in 1995, believed to be extinct in Victoria since the 1930s. The Murray hardyhead (Craterocephalus fluviatilis) can be found in the Cardross Basin.
