= Red Cliffs, Victoria =

Red Cliffs
- Suburb
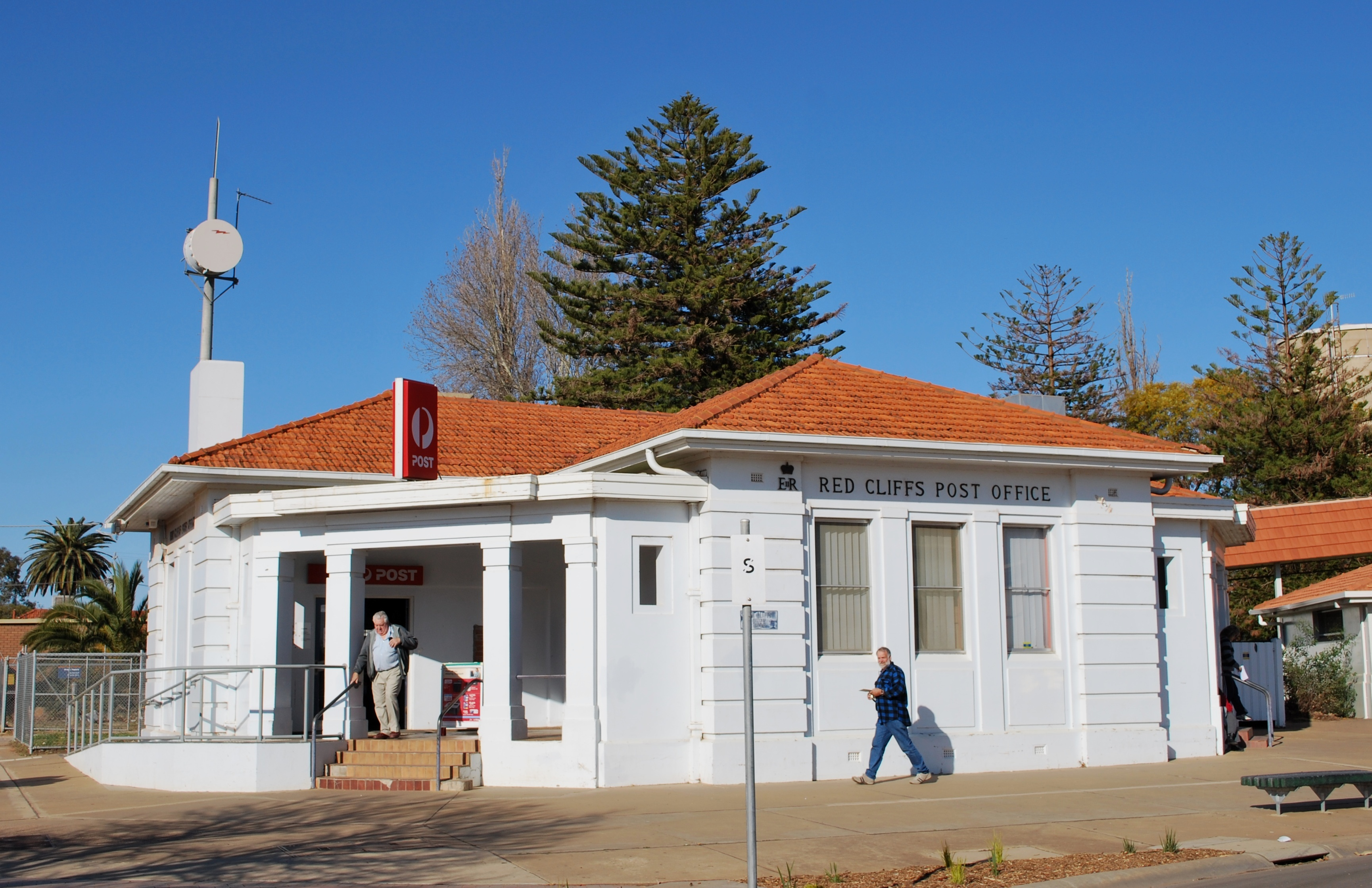
- Post office

- Coordinates: 34°18′27″S 142°11′17″E
- Country: Australia
- State: Victoria
- Region: Sunraysia
- LGA: Rural City of Mildura
- Location: 544 km (338 mi) from Melbourne; 16 km (9.9 mi) from Mildura; 86 km (53 mi) from Ouyen; 387 km (240 mi) from Bendigo

Government
  - State electorate: Mildura
  - Federal division: Mallee

Population
  - Total: 6,138 (2021 census)
- Postcode: 3496
Suburbs around Red Cliffs
Irymple	New South Wales	New South Wales
Cardross	Red Cliffs	New South Wales
Koorlong	Carwarp	Iraak

Red Cliffs is a town in Victoria, Australia in the Sunraysia region. It is located on the Calder Highway, 16 km south of Mildura and 544 km north-west of Melbourne.

At the 2016 census, Red Cliffs had a population of 5,060. The main industry is the growing of grapes and citrus. Red Cliffs takes its name from the 70 m cliffs 4.5 km east of the town that have a red/orange colour.

== History ==
Following the First World War, over 700 soldiers settled in the town, and began work on establishing the vineyards which would become the town's chief industry. The post office opened on 4 August 1920. The town and surrounding irrigation district was officially opened in 1921, and had its centenary celebration over the Melbourne Cup weekend in 2021.

The Red Cliffs Magistrates' Court closed on 1 January 1990.

In April 2022 Red Cliffs celebrated its centenary, postponed from November 2021 due to the pandemic.

== Culture ==
=== Schools ===
Red Cliffs has three primary schools, Red Cliffs Primary School, Red Cliffs East Primary School and St. Joseph's Primary School and one secondary school, Red Cliffs Secondary College.

=== Sport ===
The town has an Australian rules football team competing in the Sunraysia Football League.

Golfers play at the course of the Red Cliffs Golf Club on 22nd Street.

The town also has its own cricket association, the RCCA. The association has 2 grades and includes teams from the Sunraysia, Millewa and central Mallee areas.

=== Big Lizzie ===
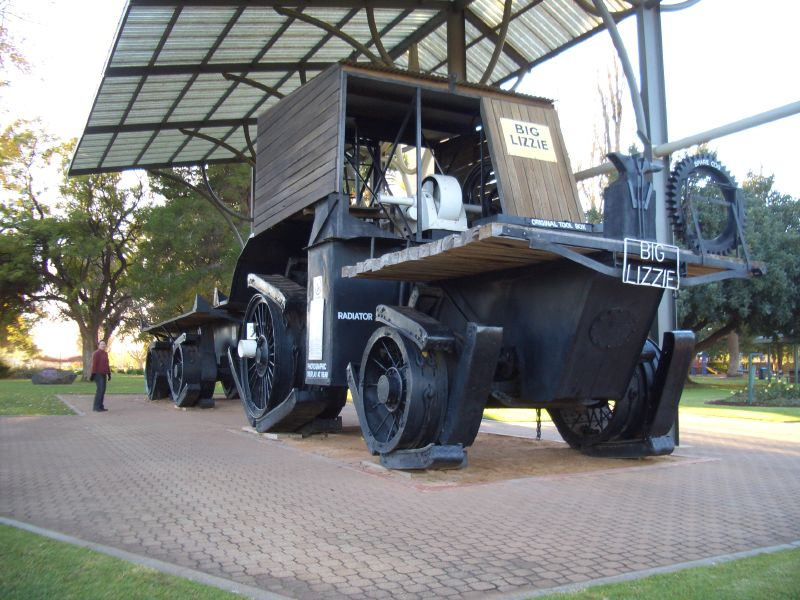
"Big Lizzie", a large tractor

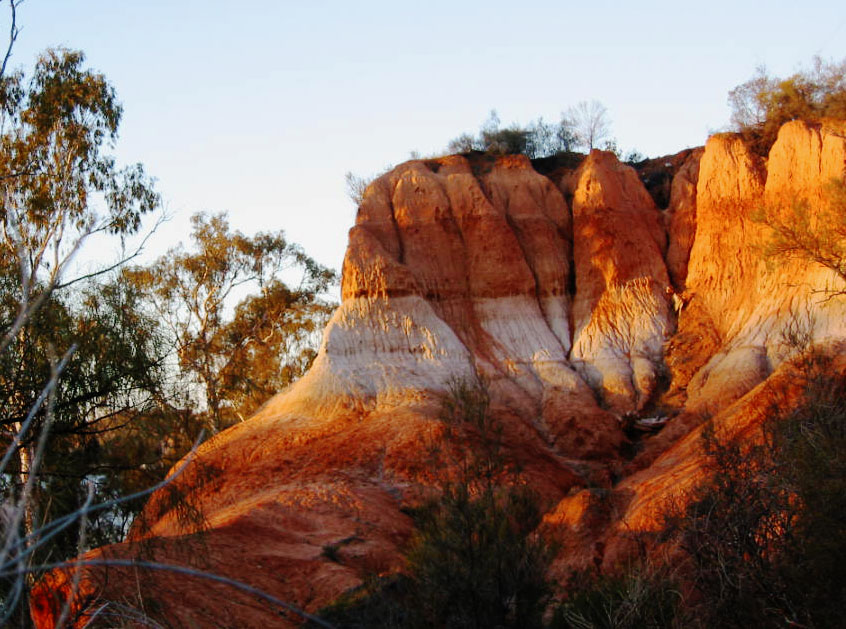
The cliffs at sunrise

Red Cliffs features a permanent public exhibit called Big Lizzie, a large tractor. Frank Bottrill was the designer, builder and operator of "Big Lizzie". One of its features was the use of the Bottrill Dreadnaught wheel which he designed, and which he also fitted to other machines. Bottrill was inspired by his experiences in the 1800s witnessing the suffering of camels carrying heavy loads. The wheel was designed to work in sandy soils. The design was effective but was later superseded by the caterpillar track. When it was built, "Big Lizzie" was the biggest tractor in Australia, and thought to be the biggest in the world, at 34 feet (10 m) high by 18 feet (5.5 m) wide, and weighing 45 tons. It had two trailers also fitted with Bottrill wheels.

The tractor received an Engineering Heritage Marker from Engineers Australia as part of its Engineering Heritage Recognition Program.

The machine was purchased for the town by the Big Lizzie Preservation Committee with help from Red Cliff's service clubs, transported from Glendenning Station (near Balmoral Village), and brought to an operating condition in time for the town's golden jubilee in October 1971.

=== Lunarfest ===
The Red Cliffs Lunarfest was held every March to celebrate the end of the grape harvest. The event included a street parade, musical performances, street market, bicycle race and an evening outdoor film screening. It was organised by the Red Cliffs Rotary Club.

== See also ==
- 1956 Murray River flood
- Red Cliffs railway station
