= Mildura =

Regional city in Victoria, Australia

- City
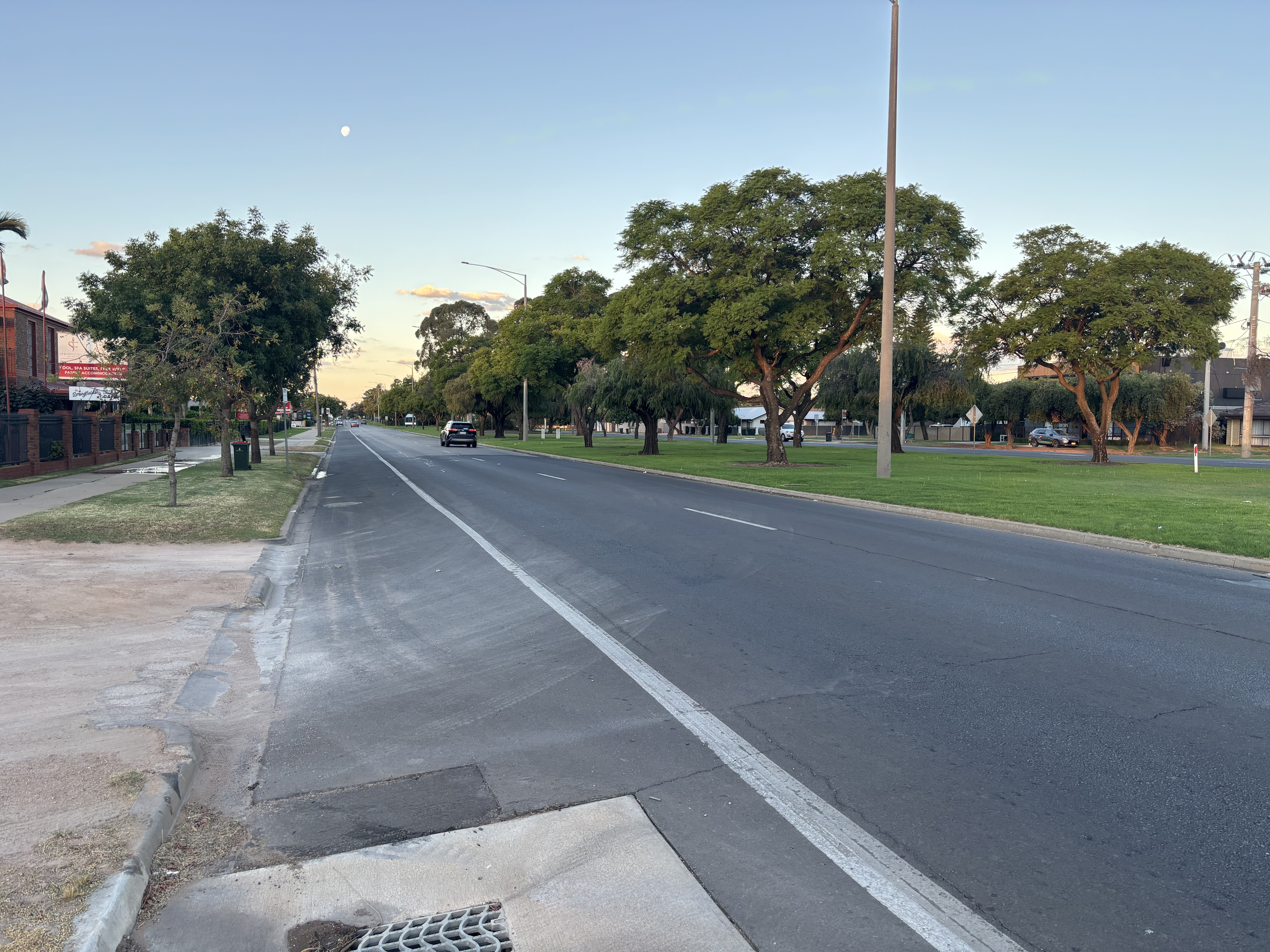
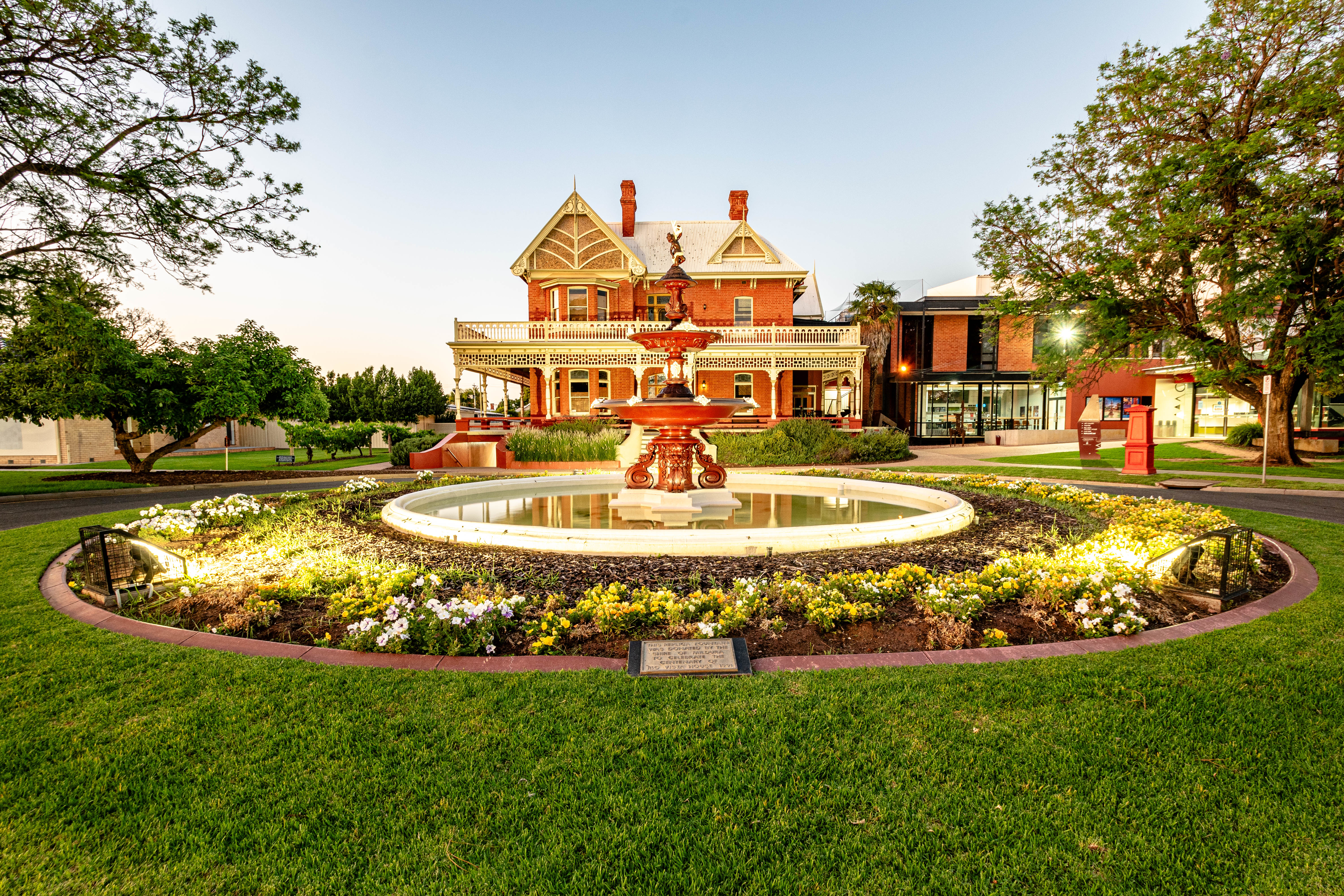
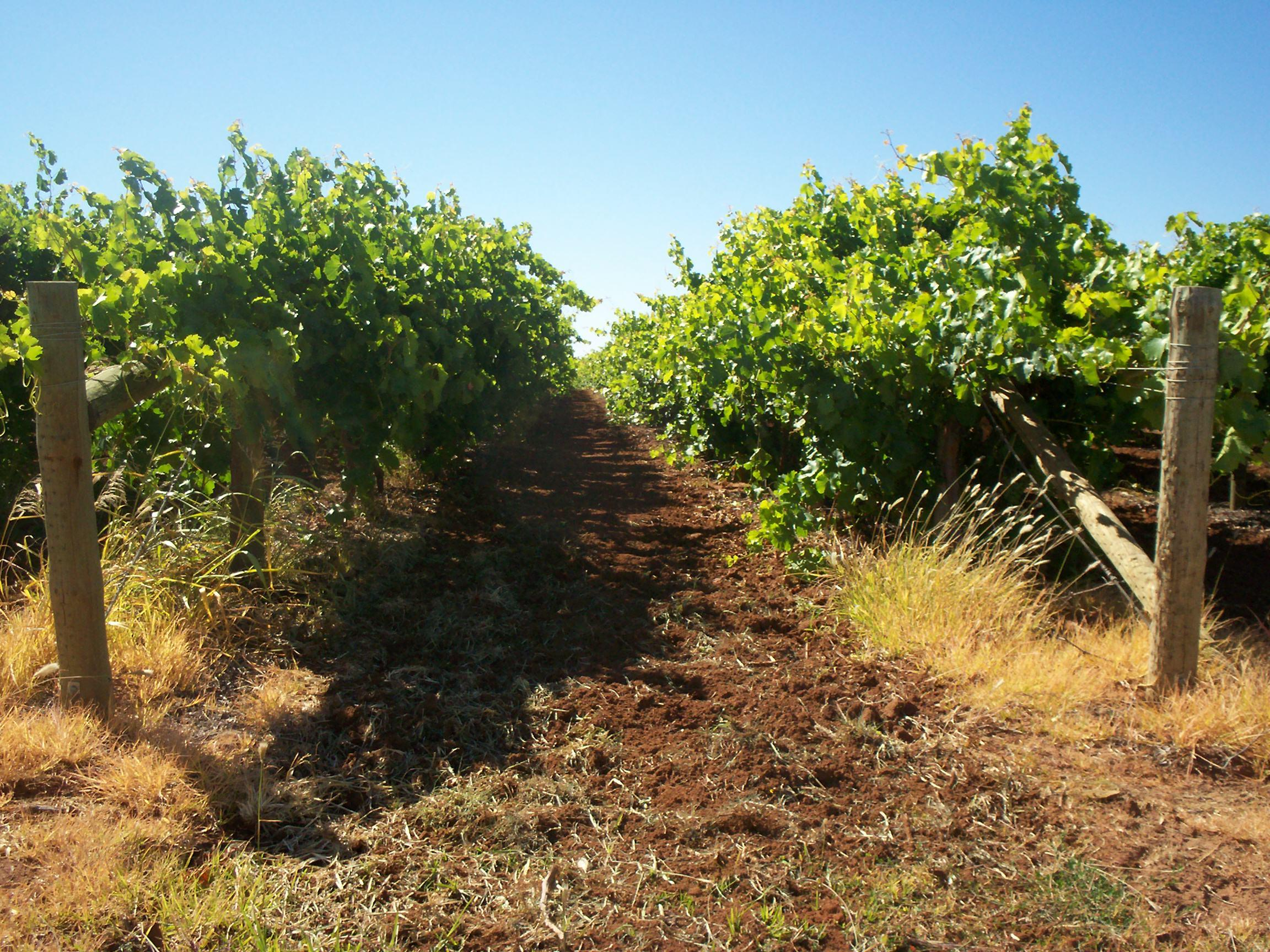
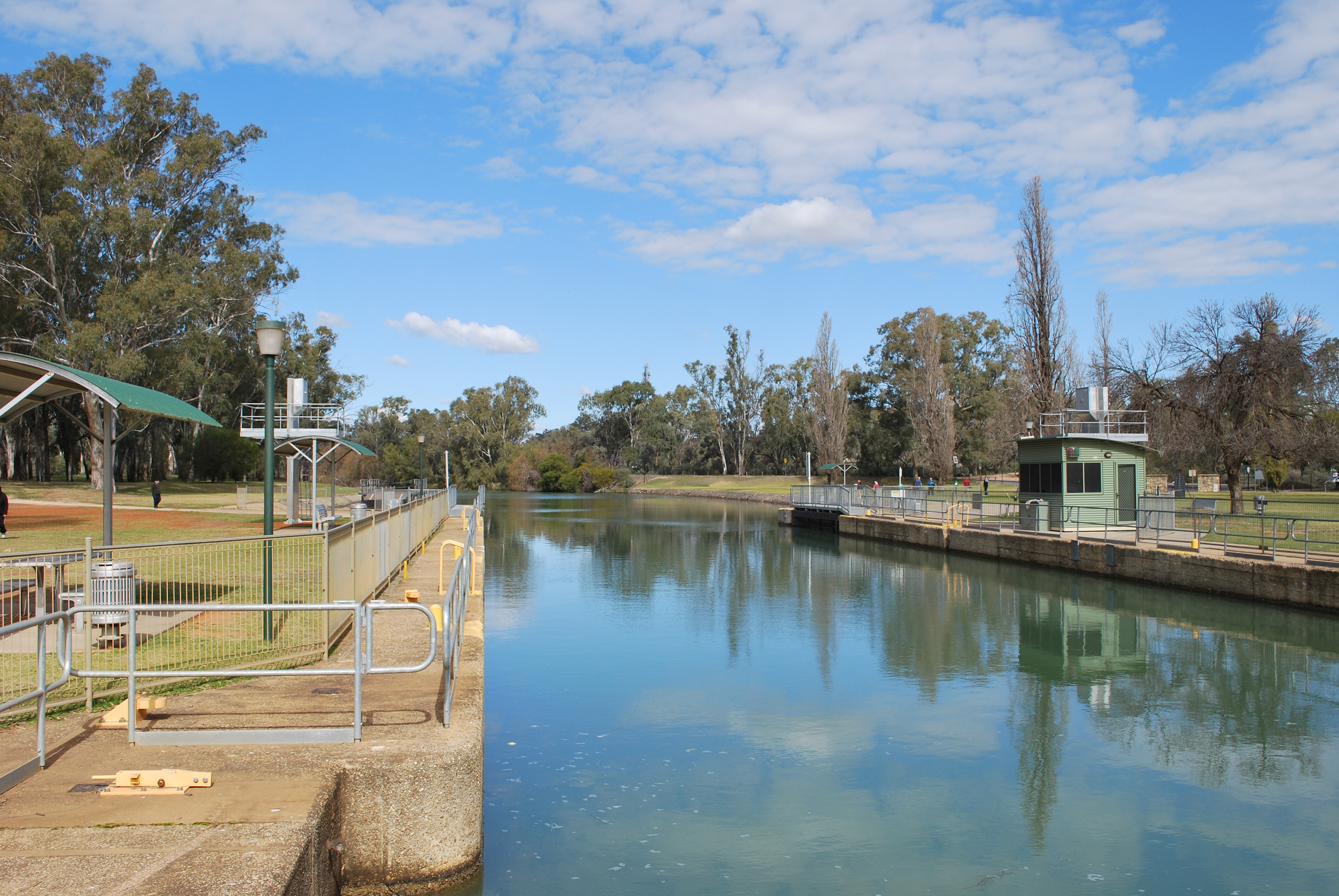
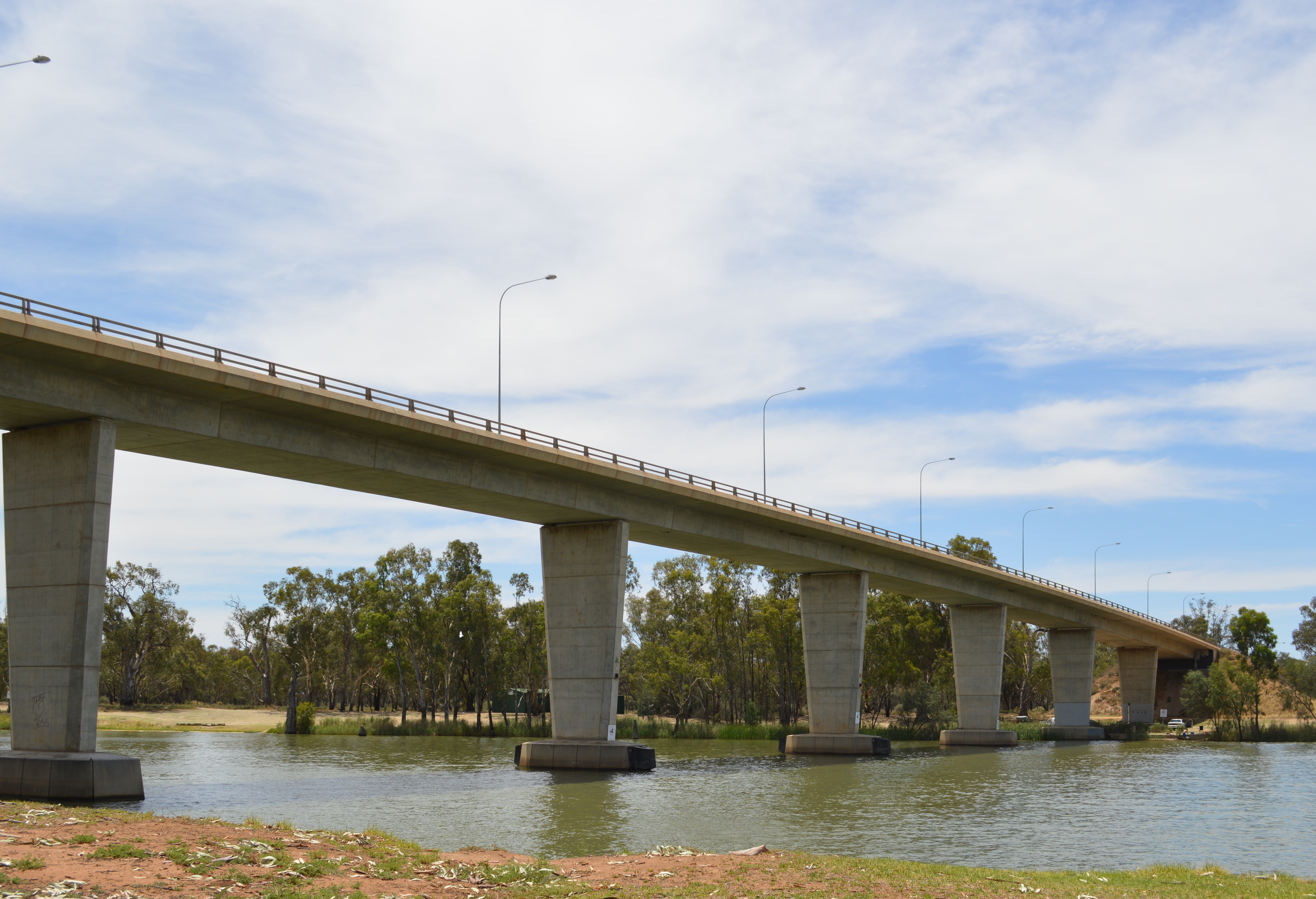
- Deakin Avenue, Mildura's high street. Rio Vista Mildura Vineyards Lock 11 George Chaffey Bridge

- Interactive map of Mildura
- Coordinates: 34°11′20″S 142°09′30″E
- Country: Australia
- State: Victoria
- Region: Sunraysia; Loddon Mallee
- LGA: Rural City of Mildura
- Location: 545 km (339 mi) NNW of Melbourne; 399 km (248 mi) ENE of Adelaide; 1,015 km (631 mi) W of Sydney; 403 km (250 mi) NNW of Bendigo
- Established: 1887

Government
  - State electorate: Mildura
  - Federal division: Mallee

Area
  - Total: 77.5 km^{2} (29.9 sq mi)
- Elevation: 51 m (167 ft)

Population
  - Total: 35,652 (2021 census)
  - Density: 460.03/km^{2} (1,191.5/sq mi)
- Time zone: UTC+10 (AEST)
  - Summer (DST): UTC+11 (AEDT)
- Postcodes: 3500; 3502 (PO Box)
- County: Karkarooc
- Mean max temp: 23.9 °C (75.0 °F)
- Mean min temp: 10.4 °C (50.7 °F)
- Annual rainfall: 289.6 mm (11.40 in)
Localities around Mildura
Birdwoodton	Dareton	Buronga
Cabarita	Mildura	Nichols Point
Koorlong	Irymple	Irymple

Mildura (/mɪlˈdjʊərə/ mill-DEW-rə) is a regional city in north-west Victoria, Australia. Located on the Victorian side of the Murray River, Mildura had a population of 35,652 at the 2021 census. When nearby Wentworth, Irymple, Nichols Point, Merbein and Red Cliffs are included, the combined urban area had a population of 58,914 in 2021, having grown marginally at an average annual rate of 1.3% year-on-year over the preceding five years.

Mildura is the largest settlement in the Sunraysia region, where around 90% of Australia's table grape exports are grown. Likewise, it is a major horticultural centre notable for its overall (table, sultana and wine) grape production, supplying about 80% of Victoria's grapes. Many wineries also source grapes from Mildura. It is very close to the New South Wales border, the Murray River, from which it draws an abundant supply of irrigation water. It is known as Australia's first 'irrigation colony' and is also referred to as an 'oasis in the desert'.

The city's central business district is located just a short distance from the banks of the Murray. Langtree Avenue is the main shopping and dining precinct in Mildura, with the middle section of the street a pedestrian mall. The other major retail precinct is along Fifteenth Street in the Mildura South area, where a mid-sized undercover shopping mall and several big box stores are located. The city's name was taken from the Mildura homestead, an early sheep station which covered most of the area. The urban area of Mildura is surrounded by irrigated horticulture, where the original grape and citrus blocks were located with water irrigated from the Murray River.

== History ==
Mildura has a long history of orange and grape farming, and an even longer history of Aboriginal occupation. This includes the Latje Latje and Ngintait peoples, amongst others, being the original inhabitants of present-day Mildura.

=== Toponymy ===
There are several theories as to the origin of the name Mildura. While it was the name of the sheep station, without precedent in the English language, most historians believe it to have originated from Aboriginal Australian words. However, the etymology of Mildura is not certain, as in several local dialects, the words mill and dura have different meanings. The word dura is generally thought to mean "earth", "sand" or "rock" in the local Ladji Ladji language. However, usage of the word mill varies by dialect and may mean "red" or "water", and thus, interpretations of the name can vary from "red earth" to "water rock".

=== Prehistory and European settlement ===
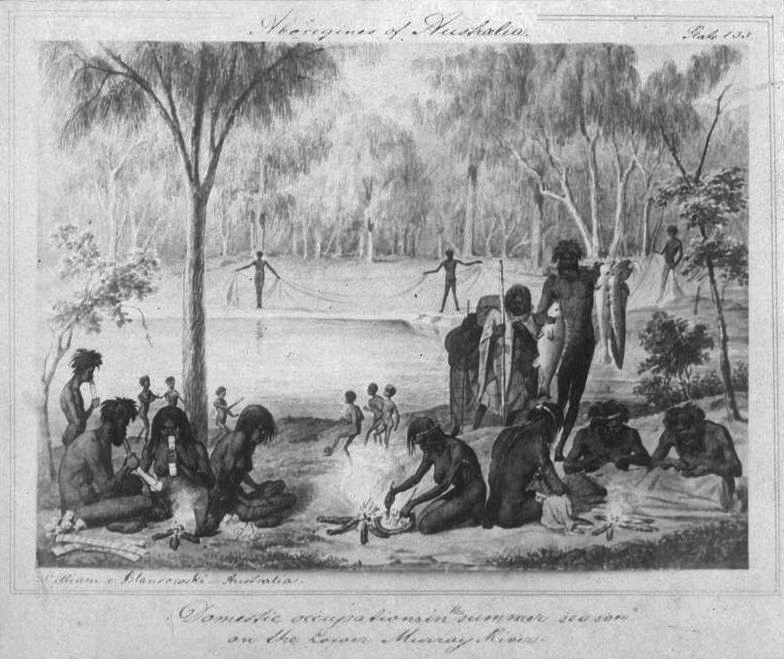
William Blandowski's 1857 depiction of Jarijari (Nyeri Nyeri) people including men hunting, women cooking and children playing near Merbein, Victoria. A form of kick and catch football is apparently being played in the background.

Many Aboriginal people lived around the site of Mildura because of the abundant food. Local tribes included the Latjilatji and Jarijari.

The first Europeans in the area arrived in 1857 and brought sheep to graze the rich pastures.

=== Irrigation settlement ===
A major drought in Victoria from 1877 to 1884 prompted Alfred Deakin, then a minister in the State Government and chairman of a Royal Commission on water supply, to visit the irrigation areas of California. There he met George and William Chaffey.

In 1886, Canadian-American irrigator George Chaffey came to Australia and selected a derelict sheep station known as Mildura as the site for his first irrigation settlement, signing an agreement with the Victorian government to spend at least £300,000 on permanent improvements at Mildura in the next twenty years.

After much political wrangling, the settlement of Mildura was established in 1887. The Post Office opened on 23 January 1888.

=== Growth ===
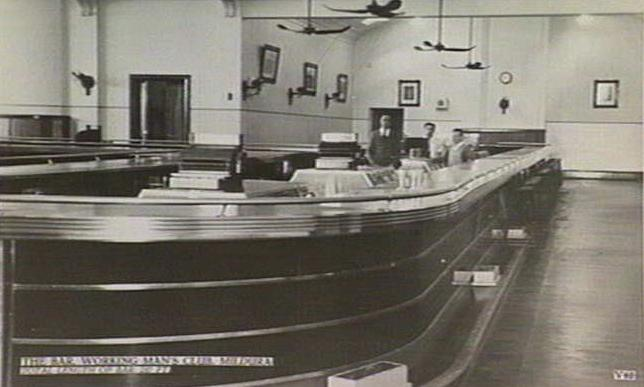
The bar of the Mildura Working Man's Club was noted in the Guinness Book of Records as the longest bar in the world until 1995 when it was removed during renovations.

The nearby towns of Wentworth, Gol Gol, Curlwaa and Yelta sprang up in the mid-to-late 19th century. In the 1890s came the scourge of the rabbit. This devastated the sheep farmers, especially south of the Murray. There was also a financial recession at this time. Combined, these factors restricted growth of the new settlement. In 1908 a Carnegie library opened as one of four in Australia. The building now houses the Mildura and District Historical Society.

After this period, the new settlement grew and grew. It was soon the main town of the district. Suburbs and new satellite towns sprang up. From the 1920s, a number of 'suburban' train services were established to Merbein and Red Cliffs. These were operated by railcars.

In 1934, Mildura was officially proclaimed a city.

Post war Mildura experienced a large influx of migrants particularly from European and Mediterranean countries including Italy and Greece. Many of these migrants were attracted by the opportunities for unskilled labour offered by the fruit picking industry.

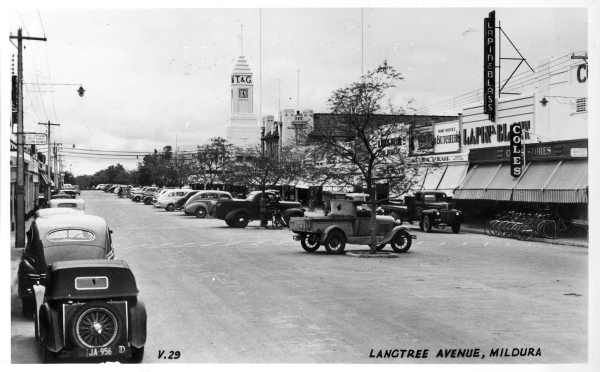
Langtree Avenue, 1950

=== Nowingi toxic waste proposal ===
In 2004, there was a controversial proposal by the Victorian Government to build a state-level Long Term Containment Facility (LTCF) for Industrial Waste in Nowingi, approximately 50 km south of Mildura. The site is a small enclave of state forest surrounded by national park, and contains habitat important to a number of threatened species.

The abandoning of the LTCF proposal was received with jubilation by opponents of the LTCF, not only in the Mildura area and elsewhere in Victoria, but also across the border in South Australia where there were fears that the toxic waste might affect the water supply via the Murray River and thereby the fruit-growing industries of the Riverland and Murraylands.

The Mildura Rural City Council and residents spent almost $2 million fighting the Government's proposal for the LTCF at Nowingi. On 10 January 2007 the Victorian Government did not rule out some form of reimbursement for the council's legal and other costs in opposing the LTCF. "The general rule is that people bear their own costs, that is most likely to apply in this case ... but I've indicated and I am prepared to talk to the council and mayor about the whole issue of how Mildura moves forward and I'll do that," John Thwaites said.

=== World ballooning championships ===
In late June to early July 2004, the 16th World Hot Air Ballooning Championships was held in Mildura,

== Geography ==
=== Topography ===
Mildura is situated on flat land without hills or mountains on the southern bank of the Murray River and surrounded to the west, north and east by lakes and billabongs including Lake Hawthorn, Lake Ranfurly and Lake Gol Gol. Several towns surround Mildura on the flat plains including Merbein to the west as well as Irymple and Red Cliffs to the south which could be considered suburban areas or satellite towns separated by small stretches of open farmland.

While the land along the river and irrigation channels is fertile, much of the land around Mildura is also dry, saline and semi-arid.

=== Urban structure ===
Mildura is a largely low-rise and low density urban area that is overwhelmingly dependent upon private vehicles for transportation. Residential dwellings consist almost solely of single-family detached homes on relatively large allotments. The population has been growing rapidly for several decades with most of the residential growth occurring in the south, south western and more recently the eastern parts of the urban area.

The central business district (CBD) is located at the northern end of the urban area, fronting onto the Murray River. The main shopping street of Mildura is Langtree Avenue, which features a pedestrian mall and shopping centre. The area between Seventh and Eighth Street is known as Feast Street, and is home to many boutique eateries and beverage dispensaries. The combined (CBD) area, known as City Heart, complements the Mildura Central Shopping Centre, located at the opposite end of the urban area on the corner of Fifteenth Street and Deakin Avenue. The latter, so named after Alfred Deakin, 'the Victorian Cabinet Minister who introduced the concept of an irrigated settlement in Australia', itself runs around twelve kilometres in a south-west direction from Seventh Street before terminating in peri-urban farmland. Fifteenth Street is the main strip of big box stores, car dealerships and other commercial enterprises.

The tallest buildings are exemplified by the two-storey 1934 Old Mildura Base Hospital, two-storey Marina Dockside apartments completed in 2010 and the three-storey tower/spire of the 1920s T&G building. Other notable tall structures that serve as literal landmarks in the city include the 'new' water tower, built in the 1950s, and the 'old' water tower, now partially subsumed by a hotel.

=== Climate ===
Mildura has a cold semi-arid climate (Köppen climate classification: BSk) with hot summers and cool winters. It is only about 50 metres above sea level despite being several hundred kilometres from the coast. It enjoys 132.0 clear days annually.

Rainfall totals are about 280 mm a year and are spread evenly across the months and seasons with winter and spring having the most rainy days.

Average maximum temperatures range from a hot 32 °C (90 °F) in summer to a cool 15 °C (59 °F) in winter. Minimum temperatures range from around 17 °C (63 °F) in summer to 4 °C (39 °F) in winter, when frost is common and often destructive to irrigated crops. Mildura experiences some very hot days in summer with temperatures exceeding 40 °C (104 °F) on a number of days per year, however are at times succeeded by cold fronts off the Bight.

Mildura received record daily rainfall on 5 February 2011 with 155 millimetres (6.1 in).

Climate data for Mildura Airport 34.24°S 142.09°E, elev. 50 m (160 ft) (1991–2020, extremes 1946–2025)
Month	Jan	Feb	Mar	Apr	May	Jun	Jul	Aug	Sep	Oct	Nov	Dec	Year
Record high °C (°F)	48.6 (119.5)	46.7 (116.1)	42.5 (108.5)	39.3 (102.7)	29.6 (85.3)	25.4 (77.7)	27.1 (80.8)	29.9 (85.8)	37.7 (99.9)	40.2 (104.4)	45.7 (114.3)	46.8 (116.2)	48.6 (119.5)
Mean daily maximum °C (°F)	33.3 (91.9)	32.5 (90.5)	28.8 (83.8)	24.1 (75.4)	19.5 (67.1)	16.3 (61.3)	15.8 (60.4)	17.8 (64.0)	21.2 (70.2)	25.0 (77.0)	28.5 (83.3)	31.0 (87.8)	24.5 (76.1)
Mean daily minimum °C (°F)	17.4 (63.3)	16.9 (62.4)	13.8 (56.8)	10.0 (50.0)	7.2 (45.0)	5.2 (41.4)	4.4 (39.9)	5.1 (41.2)	7.5 (45.5)	10.0 (50.0)	13.1 (55.6)	15.3 (59.5)	10.5 (50.9)
Record low °C (°F)	7.6 (45.7)	5.2 (41.4)	3.8 (38.8)	0.6 (33.1)	−2.1 (28.2)	−3.7 (25.3)	−4.0 (24.8)	−3.1 (26.4)	−1.1 (30.0)	1.1 (34.0)	3.3 (37.9)	5.3 (41.5)	−4.0 (24.8)
Average rainfall mm (inches)	25.2 (0.99)	23.1 (0.91)	16.2 (0.64)	16.8 (0.66)	18.8 (0.74)	20.3 (0.80)	21.2 (0.83)	21.6 (0.85)	26.1 (1.03)	24.8 (0.98)	27.7 (1.09)	31.9 (1.26)	273.6 (10.77)
Average rainy days (≥ 0.2 mm)	3.8	2.8	2.8	3.6	5.9	8.1	8.7	8.2	6.7	5.6	5.2	4.5	65.9
Average afternoon relative humidity (%)	25	27	30	34	46	54	52	42	37	30	27	25	36
Mean monthly sunshine hours	341.0	288.4	297.6	255.0	204.6	168.0	182.9	222.0	254.2	291.4	297.0	331.7	3,133.8
Source 1: Australian Bureau of Meteorology (sun 1989–2017)
Source 2: Australian Broadcasting Corporation

== Economy ==
=== Fruit and wine production ===
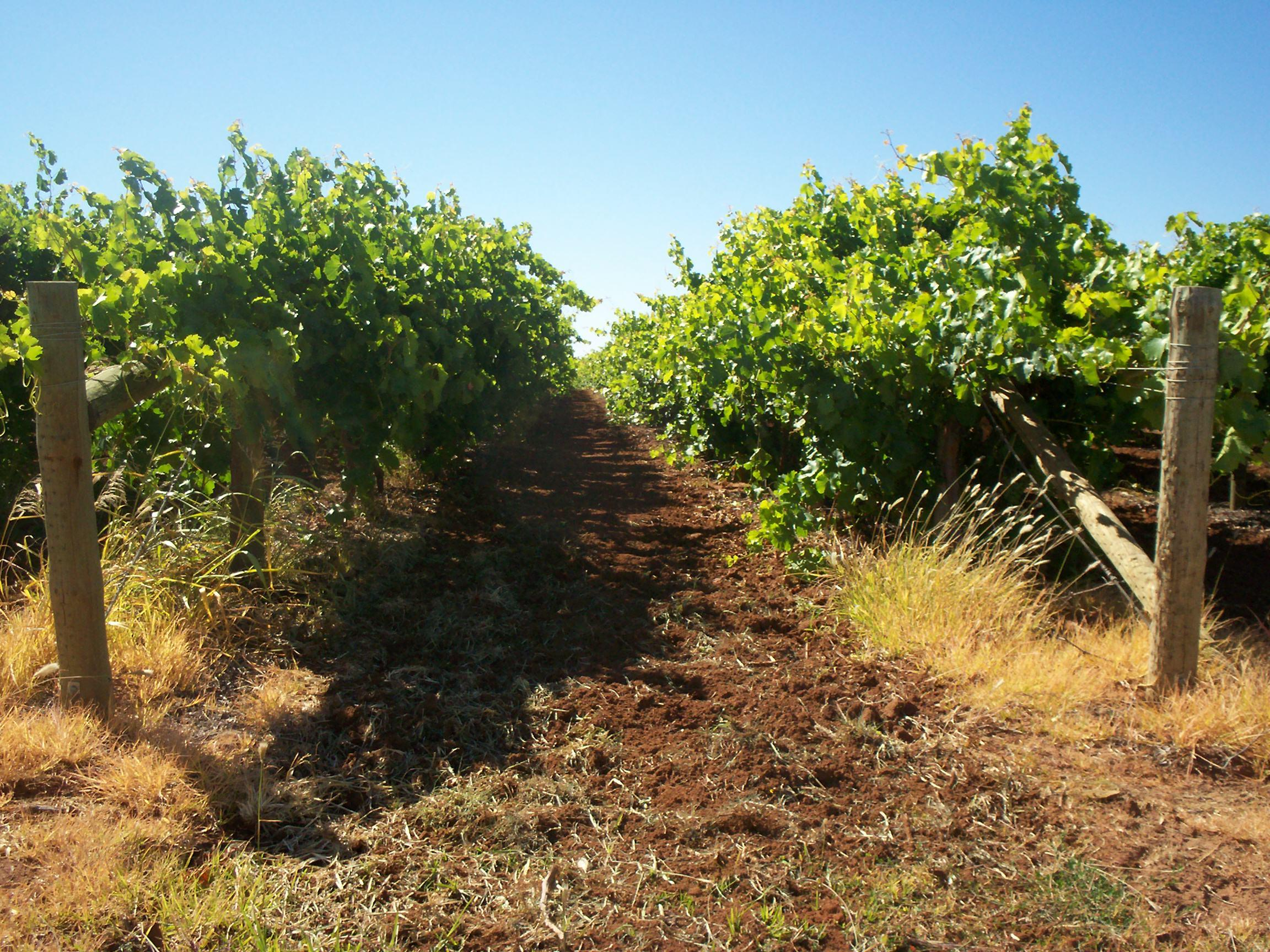
Grape vines growing in Mildura during December 2006.

Mildura is also known as the centre of Victoria's Food Bowl and is a major producer of citrus fruits (especially oranges), and wine. It is also notable for its grape production, supplying 80% of Victoria's grapes. Many wineries also source grapes from Mildura. The local area produces more than 70% of Australia's dried vine fruits.

==== Fruit Fly Exclusion Zone ====
Mildura is part of the Fruit Fly Exclusion Zone, in which fruits or vegetables may not be taken into the area (they can, however, be taken out). This is to stop the Queensland fruit fly from invading crops and plantations which could have a devastating effect on the economy. Disposal bins into which fruit can be disposed of are located along highways entering the zone.

=== Tourism ===
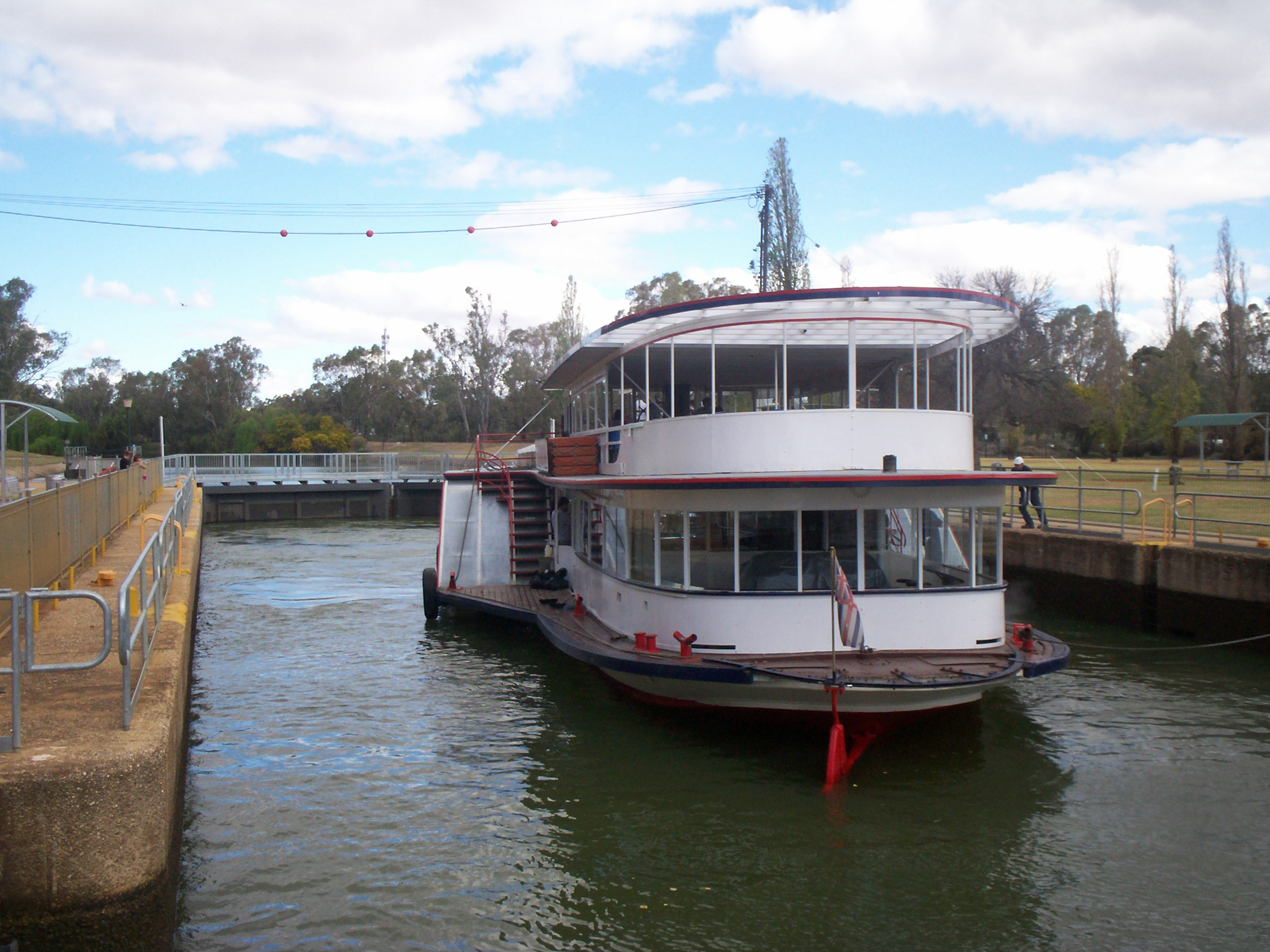
Mildura's paddlesteamers, such as the PS Melbourne, are popular with tourists

Tourism is a A$210 million industry in Mildura. However, a large percentage (30%) are domestic tourists visiting friends or relatives.

The city's situation on the Murray River makes it a hub for watersports, paddlesteamers and boat cruises. The still conditions make Mildura ideal for hot air ballooning and the Mildura International Balloon Fiesta attracts many visitors. The Australian Inland Botanic Gardens, located nearby in Mourquong is another popular attraction which draws visitors to the city.

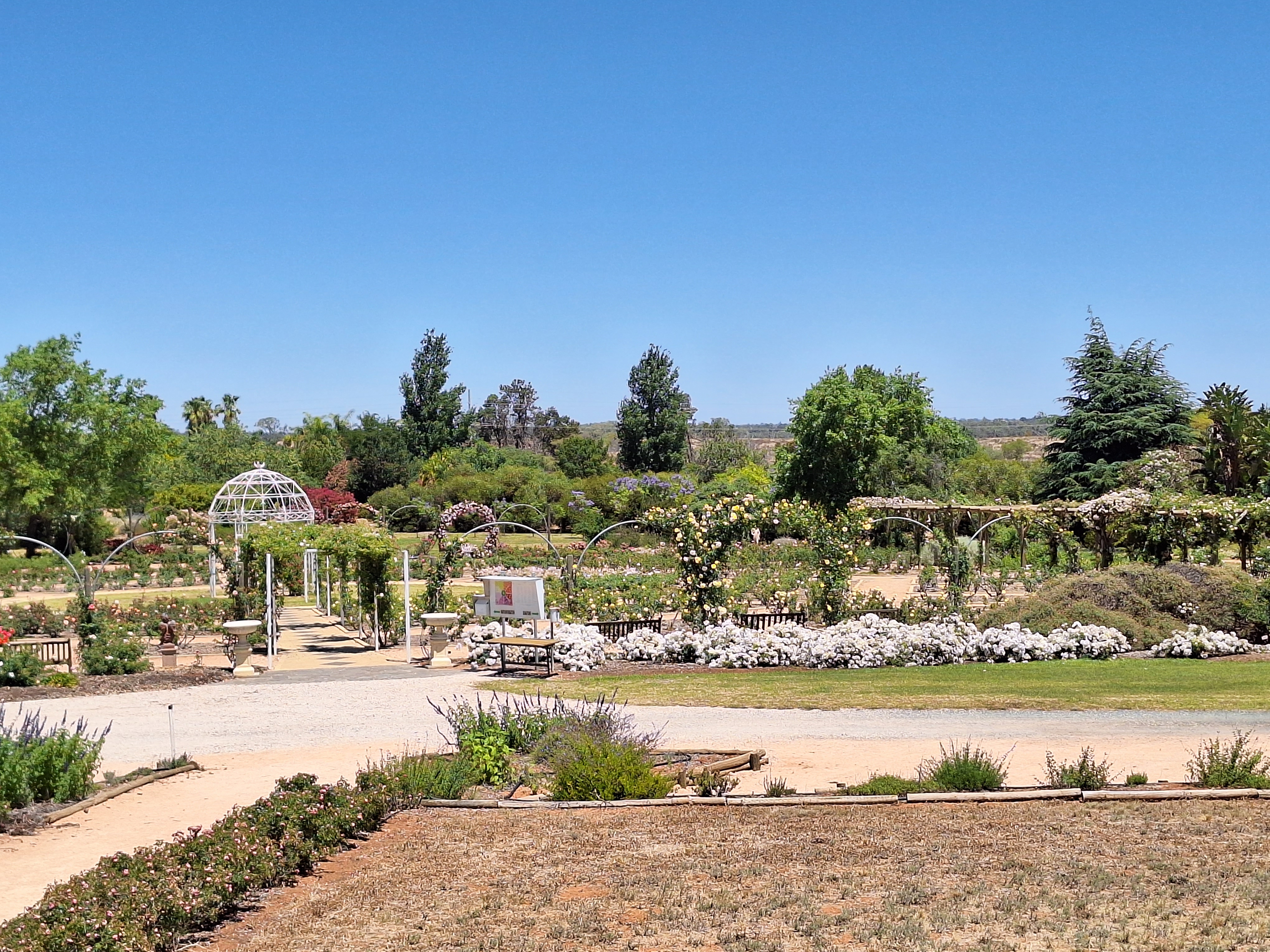
Australian Inland Botanical Gardens

=== Mildura Central ===
Mildura Central's (formerly Centro Mildura) extensive redevelopment in 2005 has positioned the centre as the major shopping destination within the Sunraysia region. Mildura Central is also the only fully enclosed, air-conditioned shopping centre in this area and offers a retail mix including representation from a number of national fashion stores. Serving a primary trade area population of 60,000 residents, Mildura Central also receives consumers from beyond the trade area including the Riverland, Swan Hill, Robinvale and Broken Hill. It includes a large Kmart (formerly an even larger Target), a Big W to the side of Mildura Central, a 19 aisle Woolworths and a Coles supermarket across the road. Other retailers in Mildura Central include JB Hi-Fi, Pandora, Jay Jays and EB Games Australia.

=== Development proposals ===
Mildura's location in Victoria and consistently strong local lobbying have seen the Government of Victoria take an interest in the city as a possible centre for population and industry decentralisation programs. There have been numerous proposals involving the state government for large scale developments and investments, many ambitious and speculative that have been shelved indefinitely.

Given the large amount of sunlight Mildura receives, it is the site for several proposals for large scale solar power in Australia including a massive solar updraft tower proposal in 2004 and 2010. In 2013, Mildura Solar Concentrator Power Station, a 1.5 MW demonstration plant, was commissioned by Silex Systems and it was expected to be expanded to 100 MW by 2017. However, in August 2014, the project was abandoned by Silex, due to lack of commitment to renewable energy by the Abbott government. The government's plans to scrap the praised Renewable Energy Target (RET) in Australia were cited as one of the main reasons for abandoning the project. International scientists criticised this decision extensively, claiming Australia risks being "left behind the rest of the world" if it cuts its plans for renewable energy. The decision to not build the plant may also cause electricity prices to rise significantly in the country.

Another large development which has been controversial was the proposal for Mildura to be the site for Victoria's second casino.

== Culture ==
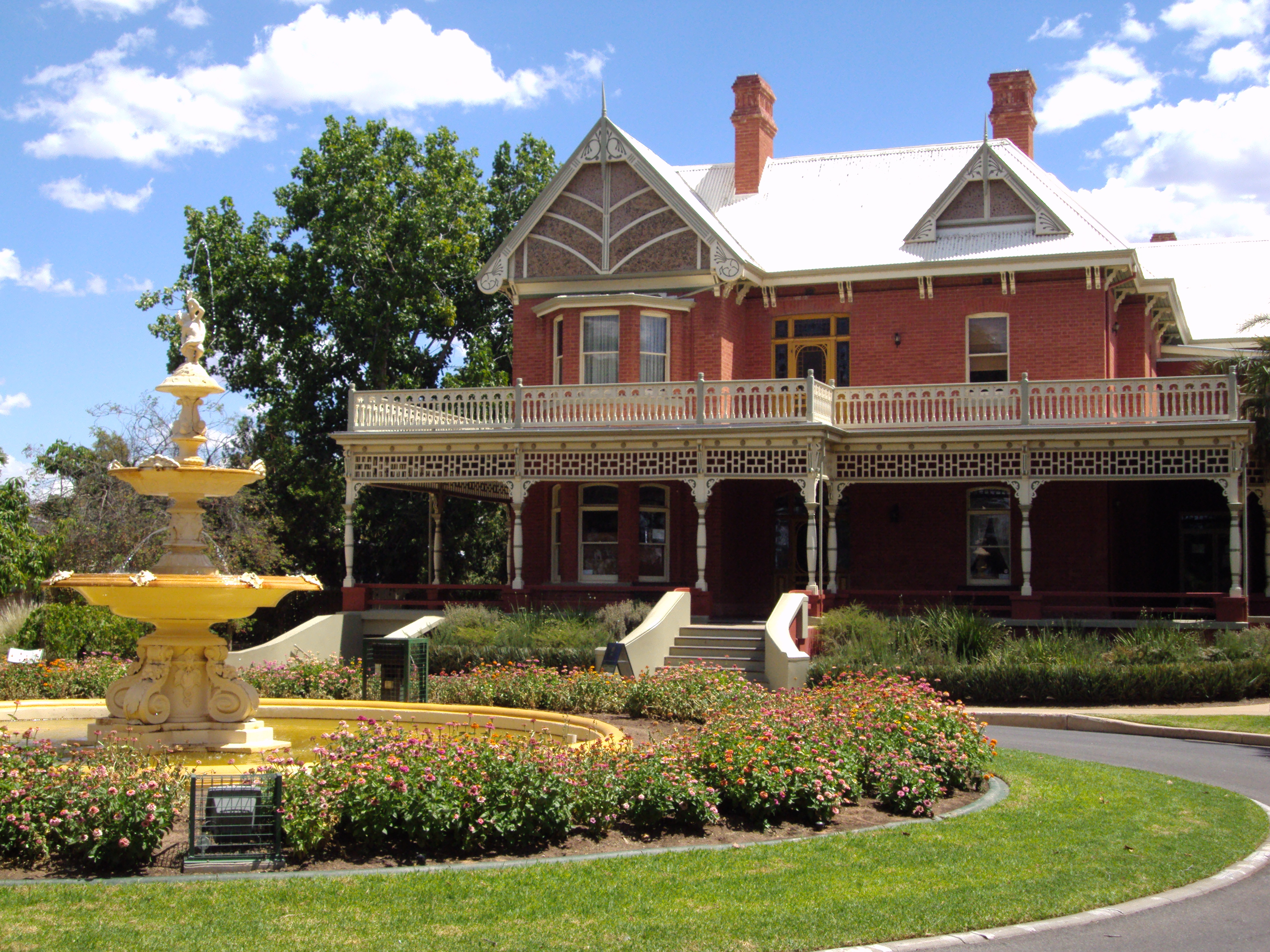
Rio Vista, the former home of Canadian engineer William Chaffey, built in the Queen Anne style.

Since early settlement Mildura has been home to artists, writers and creative people. Organisations such as the Red Cliffs Musical Society, Eisteddfod, Mildura Ballet Guild and Mildura Country Music Festival have helped grow a reputation for home grown talent and creative community. The hub of this community is the Mildura Arts Centre, which began as a gallery space at Rio Vista House in the 1950s and became fully established in 1956 with the building of a new regional art gallery and performing arts theatre. In 2012, after two years of construction, the new Mildura Arts Centre opened.

Mildura is host to many annual festivals such as the Mildura Country Music Festival, the International Balloon Fiesta, the Jazz Food & Wine Festival, Mildura Wentworth Arts Festival, Murray River International Music Festival, Mildura Writers Festival, Mildura Palimpsest, and the Mildura Show. There is also the annual Mildura masters coarse fishing competition held in November which attracts a number of international and local coarse anglers and the Australian Alternative Varieties Wine Show.

== Demographics ==
As of the 2021 census, there were 35,652 people residing in 16,217 households. Indigenous Australians make up 5.4% of Mildura's population. 75.6% of people were born in Australia. The next most common countries of birth were Malaysia 2.5%, India 1.5%, England 1.3%, Italy 0.9%, and Vietnam 0.9%. 77.0% of people spoke only English at home. Other languages spoken at home included Mandarin 2.3%, Italian 1.5%, Vietnamese 1.1%, Turkish 1.0% and Punjabi 0.9%. The most common responses for religion were No Religion, so described 41.5%, Catholic 19.2% and Anglican 8.3%.

== Crime ==
In 2018, Mildura recorded the highest rural crime rate in Victoria and the fourth highest crime rate in the state overall.

=== Organised crime ===
Mildura has long been associated with the Calabrian Mafia, with claims made by police in 1966 that annual organised crime meetings were held in Mildura to co-ordinate nationwide criminal activities. In a 1960s National Anti-Mafia Directorate report by John T. Cusack (United States' Bureau of Narcotics) and Ugo Macera (assistant commissioner of police in Calabria) claims were made that the "ancient Calabrian Secret Criminal Society known as the L'Onorata Societa" and the "'Ndrangheta" were operating "throughout the State, with large segments in the fruit growing and farming areas of Mildura and Shepparton" adding that "There are reports the Society has existed in Victoria since 1930". They have reportedly been involved in revenge killings, cannabis production and weapons purchases.

During the 1980s, the Mildura Mafia emerged as a major crime group that dominated marijuana production in Australia and ran an Australia-wide money-laundering network. Several notable mafia murders have been linked to the region including the suspected mafia hit on 43-year-old Marco Medici in 1983, police believe the murder may be connected to the assassination of anti-drug crusader Donald MacKay at Griffith in 1977. The 1984 murders of Melbourne gangsters Rocco Medici and Giuseppe Furina are also connected to Mildura through the Medici family. In 1982, 42-year-old Mildura greengrocer Dominic Marafiote and his parents were murdered after Marafiote gave South Australian police the names of Calabrian mafia bosses in South Australia, Victoria and New South Wales. In 2016 Mildura residents Nicola Ciconte, Vincenzo Medici and Michael Calleja were convicted and sentenced in Italy for their role in a plot to smuggle up to 500 kilograms of cocaine into Australia.

=== Methamphetamine epidemic ===
Mildura has recorded significantly higher than average rates of methamphetamine use. Rural methamphetamine use overall is 2.5 times higher than in metropolitan areas. Prior to 2010 rates of use of illicit drugs in rural areas were significantly lower than those in the cities.

In 2014, a Mildura-based Comancheros Motorcycle Club member and former Australian Defence Force (ADF) sniper, Joshua Faulkhead, was arrested after being caught transporting large quantities of methamphetamine, cocaine and ecstasy between Sydney and Mildura. Faulkhead was sentenced to nine years and five months in jail.

In 2015, 20 people were involved in a large drug trafficking operation in Mildura in north-west Victoria. Methamphetamine, marijuana and ecstasy were seized in raids. The drugs seized were reported to be worth more than $15,000. $20,000 in cash were seized and a number of weapons were also seized. Later that same year, Stephen Gillard and Geoffrey Hitchen from South Penrith, were arrested for possession of $300,000 worth of methamphetamines in scrubland off the Mallee Highway at Tutye, west of Ouyen. Local farmers uncovered plastic fruit juice bottles containing the drugs after noticing the men behaving strangely the previous day.

In 2017, a joint Australian Federal Police (AFP) and United States Drug Enforcement Administration (DEA) investigation lead to the seizure of $2.4 million in cash at the Mildura Airport, after 255 kilograms crystal methamphetamine were found at a storage facility in Northern California in June. The bust was part of an investigation into an alleged conspiracy to use a light plane to export drugs from the US to Australia. The 72-year-old pilot, a 52-year-old man from Zetland, and a 58-year-old Melbourne man were charged with conspiracy to import a commercial quantity of border controlled drugs and money laundering offences. The crystal methamphetamine was reported to be worth $255 million. Those arrests were connected to $2.4 million which was found in Mildura, in a prime mover that was driven from Adelaide in April.

== Notable people ==
Notable people from Mildura include:

- Leigh Adams, retired motorcycle speedway rider. Ten time Australian Solo Champion and the 1992 World Under-21 Champion. Including juniors, Adams won a total of 16 Australian championships and 4 World Championships.
- Jason Akermanis, Australian rules footballer. Won the 2001 Brownlow Medal.
- Adam Bland, PGA tour golfer.
- Jason Crump, retired Motorcycle speedway rider. Australia's only triple Speedway World Champion (2004, 2006 and 2009).
- Phil Crump, retired motorcycle speedway rider. The father of Jason Crump, he is a four time Australian Solo Champion and thirteen time Victorian champion.
- Matt Dea, Australian rules footballer. Currently plays for the Essendon Football Club in the Australian Football League.
- Ken Duncan, OAM, Australian landscape photographer.
- Patricia Edgar, founding director of the Australian Children's Television Foundation.
- Ted Hill (1915–1988), barrister and communist activist.
- Rick Kelly, V8 Supercar driver. 2001 Australian Drivers' Champion, 2006 V8 Supercar Champion, and 2003 and 2004 Bathurst 1000 winner.
- Todd Kelly, V8 Supercar driver. Winner of the 2003 Bathurst 24 Hour and 2005 Bathurst 1000.
- Sam Kerridge, former Australian rules footballer. Played for the Carlton Football Club.
- Matthew Knights, former Richmond Football Club captain and former Essendon Football Club coach.
- Mark Lee, 1980 Premiership player and 1984 Jack Dyer Medalist, Richmond Football Club
- Jason Lyons, retired motorcycle speedway rider. 1999 Speedway World Team Cup and 2002 Speedway World Cup winner and a three time Victorian Champion.
- Kris McCarthy, Olympic middle-distance runner.
- Ron McEwin, (1928–2007) former Essendon VFL player.
- Warren Monson (1975–2023), sidecar speedway rider. Two times winner of the FIM Speedway Sidecar World Cup.
- Lochie O'Brien, Carlton AFL player.
- Ellen Sandell, politician and environmentalist, currently deputy leader of the Victorian Greens.
- Ariel Steinberg, Australian rules footballer formerly playing for the Essendon Football Club.
- Dylan Stephens, Sydney Swans and North Melbourne Football Club AFL player.
- Colin Sylvia, former Melbourne Football Club and Fremantle Football Club midfielder.
- Melinda Tankard Reist, conservative political activist, writer, speaker and media commentator.
- Chris Tarrant, Collingwood Football Club defender.
- Robbie Tarrant, Australian rules footballer
- Cam Waters, racing driver.
- Josh Waters, Superbike rider, Suzuki works rider for 2014, winner of race 2 Brands Hatch BSB, 20 July 2014.
- Dale Weightman, Richmond Football Club 1978–1993.
- Arron Wood, former deputy Lord Mayor and acting Lord Mayor of Melbourne.
- Julia Zaetta, editor of Better Homes and Gardens.
- Tania Zaetta, actress and television presenter.

== Media ==
Local newspapers include the Sunraysia Daily, Mildura Midweek and Mildura Weekly. Online news sources include the Mildura Independent Star, Rural Rebel Media (Independent) and River 1467 AM News. Local radio stations include ABC Mildura Swan Hill (National), River 1467 AM (3ML) (Commercial), 97.9 Sun FM Sunraysia (Commercial), 99.5 Star FM (Commercial), and Hot FM (Community).

Local TV stations include ABC TV, SBS TV, Seven, WIN Television (Nine), 7two, 7mate, 7flix, 7Bravo, 9Go!, 9Gem, 9Life, ABC HD, ABC Family, ABC Kids, ABC Entertains, ABC News, SBS HD, SBS2, SBS World Movies, SBS Food, NITV and SBS WorldWatch. Network 10, 10 Bold Drama and 10 Peach Comedy channels were available in Mildura until MDT's closure in June 2024.

One Of the two main commercial networks, Seven News produces short local news and weather updates throughout the day, broadcast from its Canberra studios. WIN Mildura reintroduced half-hour WIN News bulletins for the Sunraysia region in November 2025, having previously cancelled the bulletin in May 2015.

The Sunraysia region, including the city of Mildura, was the first region in Australia to switch off analogue TV broadcast in the implementation of the country's DTV transition process. It is also the first region in Australia to switch off a digital TV broadcast, with Mildura Digital Television ceasing operations after WIN and Seven decided to pull the plug due to the station running at a loss since its inception in 2006. MDV concluded operations on 30 June 2024, and the MDV license was handed back to the Australian Communications and Media Authority. Following the shutdown of MDV, the Australian Government made its Viewer Access Satellite Television (VAST) service available to all viewers in the Mildura/Sunraysia TV1 license area.

== Sport ==
Mildura has three Australian rules football teams competing in the Sunraysia Football League; Imperials, Mildura and South Mildura, along with three other clubs nearby in Irymple, Merbein and Red Cliffs. Other clubs in the league are Ouyen United, Robinvale-Euston and Wentworth District. Mildura also have a junior football League ranging from age groups of under 10s to under 16s.

The Sunraysia Cricket Association (SCA) operates its competition between October and March annually. The SCA consists of fifteen teams; original SCA teams Coomealla-Wentworth, Merbein, Irymple, Mildura East, Mildura Settlers, Mildura West, Nichols Point and Workers-Gol Gol. The newly established Mildura Royals (whose cricket team is based in Cardross) joined the association for the 2024/25 season, as well as former Red Cliffs Cricket Association teams Curlwaa, Fire Brigade (Red Cliffs), Millewa, Nursery Ridge (Red Cliffs), Ouyen, Tempy, and South West (Red Cliffs). As of the end of the 2025/26 season, the SCA does not include ex-RCCA clubs Robinvale-Euston or Cardross cricket clubs, who are in recess.

The Sunraysia Rugby League is also based in Mildura and has six senior men's teams competing for the annual premiership. Rugby league matches are played from May to September.

Mildura is a town well-known for motor sports. It has several tracks in the region to cater for different types of motor sports, including the Mildura Kart Club (Go-Kart racing), Timmis Speedway (Automobile speedway), Olympic Park Speedway (Motorcycle speedway), Sunset Strip (1/8-mile drag racing), and North West Victoria Motorcycle Club. (Off-road motorcycle racing). The Mildura TT Circuit hosted the Australian TT in the 1950s.

Mildura has six swimming clubs and local competitions are regularly held during summer. Clubs train all year round. Mildura has a history of producing many country, state and national champions.

The Sunraysia Baseball League plays during autumn and winter and has four baseball clubs in the league; Hawks, Saints, Eagles and Wanderers. There are four junior grades (U/7s, U/10s, U/13s and U/16s), three senior grades (A, B and C Grade) and a women's competition. Basketball is also popular in Mildura with hundreds of teams in all divisions entered in the Mildura Basketball Association's summer league. Soccer also has a large following in Mildura, with there being a popular junior and senior league played during the winter months. The league consists of six teams, those being Three Colours, Mildura City, Mildura United, Irymple Knights, Nichols Point and Northern Suns.

Mildura is home to four field hockey teams (Koowinda, Mildura Wanderers, Rivaside and Waratahs) which compete in the Sunraysia Hockey Association. The association has grades for males and females, ranging from Under 9s to A grade. Roller Derby is a growing sport in the region, with Mildura having its own league, the Mildura Roller Derby League, which participates in competitions around Victoria and, at least annually, holds a tournament in Mildura.

Mildura has a horse racing club, the Mildura Racing Club, which schedules around nine race meetings a year including the Mildura Cup meeting in May. The Mildura Harness Racing Club conducts regular meetings at its racetrack in the city.

Golfers play at the course of the Mildura Golf Club on Twelfth Street.

== Transport ==
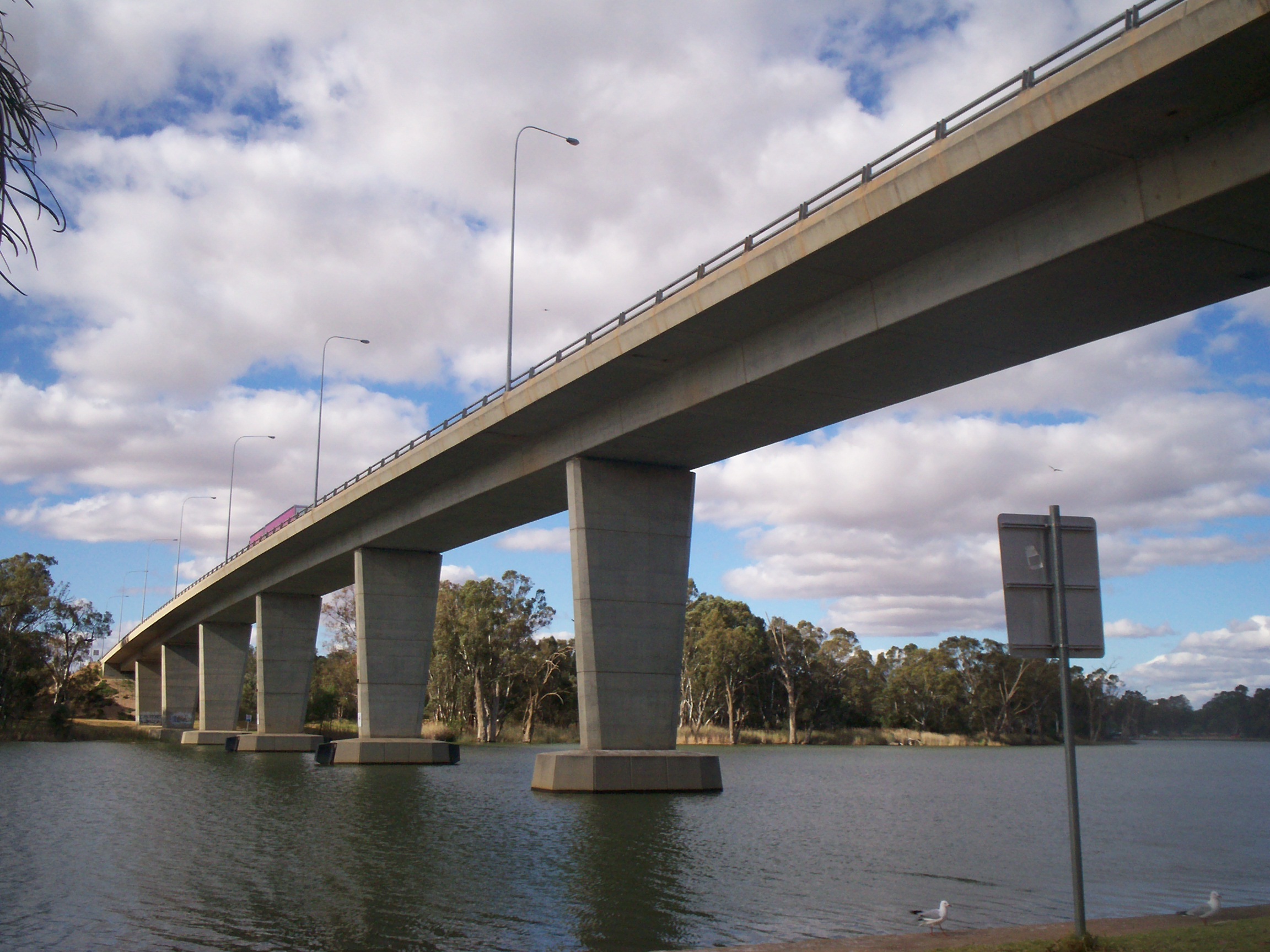
The George Chaffey Bridge over the Murray River

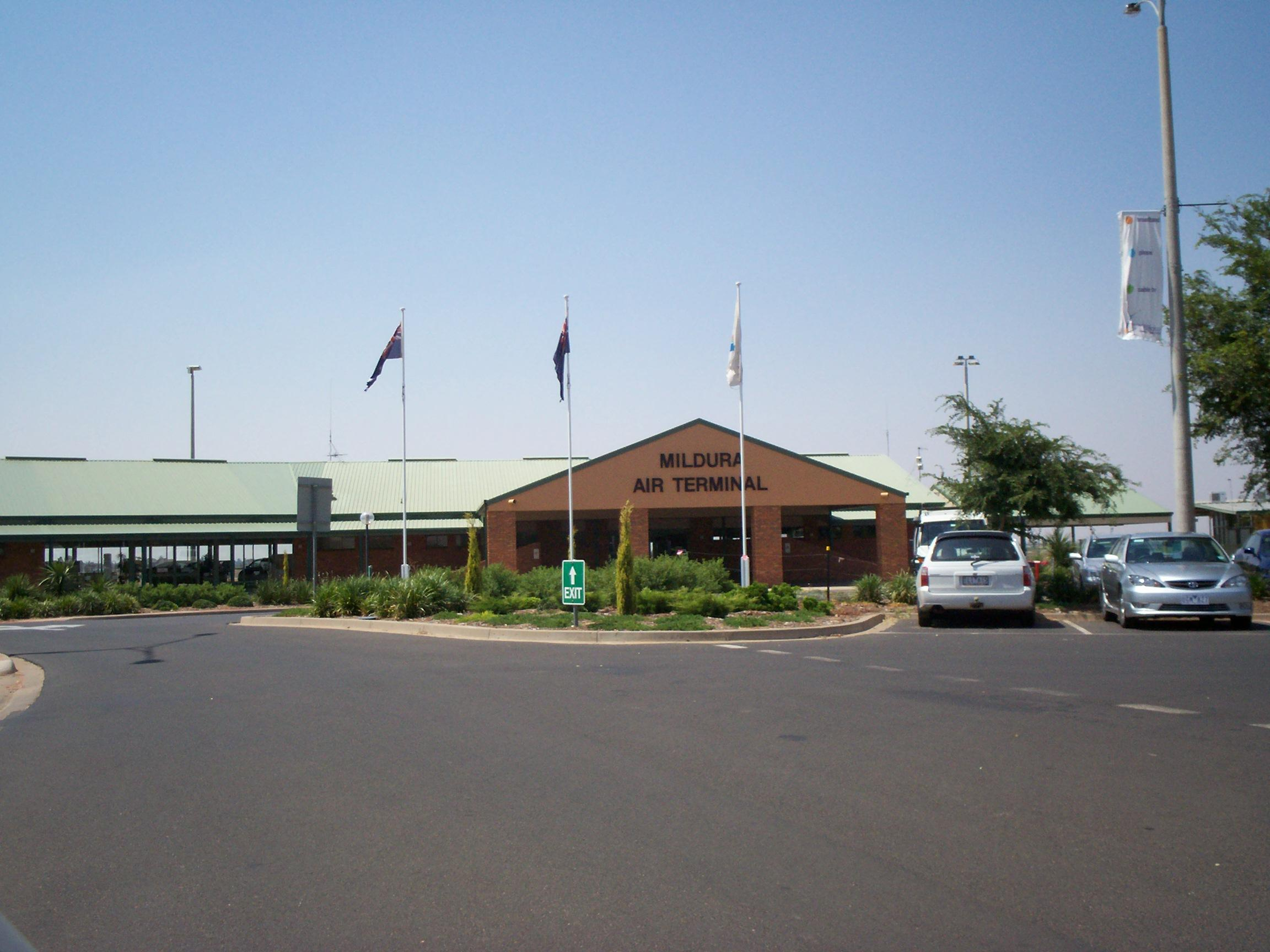
Mildura Airport

Mildura is on the intersection of the Sturt Highway from Adelaide to Sydney and the Calder Highway to Melbourne via Bendigo. Deakin Avenue, the main street of Mildura, is known as the longest straight avenue in Australia, at 12.1 km. CDC Mildura, BusBiz and Dysons operate V/Line bus services that connect Mildura to various parts of Victoria and southern New South Wales. Greyhound Australia run buses to Adelaide and Sydney via Canberra. NSW TrainLink run buses to Sydney. The Henty Highway Bus Service runs buses to Horsham.

Mildura has a railway connection to Melbourne, which is used for freight transport that generally runs three times a week in each direction. In May 2006, it was announced that the Mildura line would receive a $73 million upgrade using gauge convertible sleepers.

Mildura Airport is the busiest regional airport in Victoria.

== Education ==
=== St Joseph's College ===
In 1905, a small group of Sisters of Mercy came from Wentworth to Mildura and established a convent in a weatherboard building on the corner of Pine Avenue and Tenth Street.

Catholic secondary education commenced in Mildura in 1906 when the Sisters of Mercy began conducting classes in rooms attached to the original convent in Pine Avenue. The Certificate of Registration of a School, dated 31 December 1906, indicates that sub-primary, primary and secondary classes were being conducted from the convent at the time.

In 1911 boarding school facilities were provided in Olive Avenue and in 1914 a new school was erected in Walnut Avenue. The first buildings of St Joseph's College at its present site were opened in 1929. The college has well equipped classrooms, science and computer laboratories, creative arts and design and technology complex, religious education centre, library, sports facilities, staff and student amenities.

=== Mildura Senior College ===
The college has been closely linked with the development of Mildura since the opening of the irrigation settlement by the Chaffeys in the 1880s. In 1890 the Governor of Victoria, Lord Hopetoun, laid the foundation stone of what was to become the Chaffey Agricultural College but, due to financial difficulties, the college was not built. In 1911, the Education Department of Victoria agreed to erect a high school on the Chaffey College site and Mildura High School was officially opened in September 1912. The diamond jubilee of the school was celebrated on 8 and 9 September 1972. It celebrated its 75th anniversary in August 1987 and in 2012 celebrated its centenary over the weekend of 14–16 September.

As part of a strategic plan by the Ministry of Education in 1990, Mildura High School changed its name to Mildura Secondary College to reflect the changing nature of educational delivery in secondary schools. Again, as a result of restructuring in education provision since 1995, the college has been known as Mildura Senior College, catering exclusively for the final two years of secondary education.

Mildura Senior College caters exclusively for Year 11 & 12 students. In 2013 there will be approximately 500 students in Year 11 and 400 in Year 12. Entrance to Year 11 is open to all students living in the Sunraysia District who have successfully completed Year 10. The decision regarding the satisfactory completion of Year 10 is the responsibility of the 7-10 College. Enrolment at the College is also dependent on factors such as age, behaviour record and other achievements. Please see the section on enrolment for further information.

=== Chaffey Secondary College ===
Chaffey Secondary College is a Victorian state government secondary school catering for students in Years 7 to 10 located in Deakin Avenue. In 2012 the college had 640 students enrolled. The college offers 120 to 140 different courses each term as part of its modular learning program. Students and families participate in a program of course counselling and student-led presentations each term to help students create the most appropriate course for their ability, pathway and interests. The college has a double-court gymnasium which it operates as a joint-use facility with the Mildura Rural City Council. The college operates a small theatre with seating for up to 220 people.

=== Sunraysia Institute of TAFE ===
Sunraysia Institute of TAFE's main campus is located in Benetook Avenue. In 2008, the institute had 6,592 students enrolled.

=== Trinity Lutheran College ===
TLC is a co-educational Christian School and an International Baccalaureate Candidate School. It educates boys and girls in Prep to Year 10. It is located at 920 Fifteenth St, Mildura.

The school began in 1982 as a primary school titled Holy Trinity Lutheran School. In 2000 the school began its transition to the secondary level with the addition of a Year 7 class. This class completed Year 10 in 2003.

In 2004 the school changed its name to Trinity Lutheran College.

=== La Trobe University ===
La Trobe University operates a regional campus in Mildura, with 500 students enrolled as of 14 February 2018.

== In popular culture ==
Two Australian Navy vessels have been named after Mildura, HMAS Mildura and HMS Mildura.

The songs "Mildura (Home of Mine)" and "Come to Mildura – the Land of Winter Sunshine" were written by Reg. Stoneham in the 1920s.

G. H. Ball's "My Old Home Town (Mildura)" was recorded on the B-side of John Collinson's first recording of "Waltzing Matilda" in 1926.

== Sister cities ==
Mildura has three sister cities, as designated by Sister Cities International:

- Upland, California, United States, which, like Mildura, was established as an irrigation community by George and William Chaffey
- Kumatori, Osaka, Japan
- Dali City, Yunnan, China

== See also ==
- 1956 Murray River flood
- Cardross road accident
- PS Success
- Mildura Airport
- List of cities in Victoria, Australia
- People from Mildura
