= Linga, Victoria =

Linga
- Town
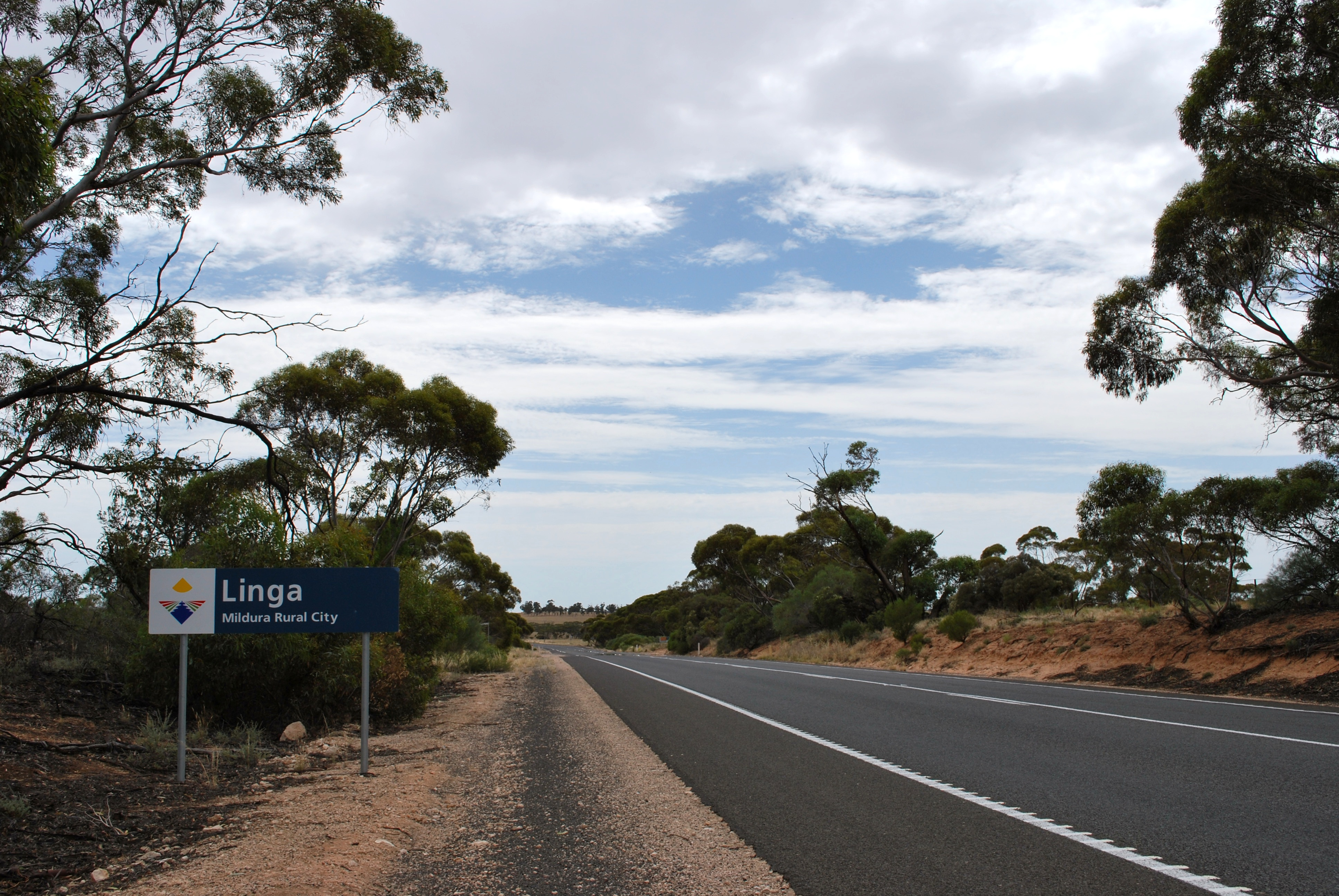
- Entering Linga

- Coordinates: 35°10′24″S 141°41′33″E
- Country: Australia
- State: Victoria
- LGA: Rural City of Mildura
- Location: 487 km (303 mi) from Melbourne; 165 km (103 mi) from Mildura; 11 km (6.8 mi) from Underbool; 8 km (5.0 mi) from Boinka

Government
  - State electorate: Mildura
  - Federal division: Mallee
- Elevation: 98 m (322 ft)

Population
  - Total: 10 (2016 census)
- Postcode: 3509
Localities around Linga
Boinka	Murray-Sunset	Murray-Sunset
Boinka	Linga	Underbool
Big Desert	Big Desert	Big Desert

Linga is a locality situated on the section of the Mallee Highway and Pinnaroo railway line between Ouyen and the South Australian border in the Sunraysia region. It is situated about 8 kilometres east from Boinka and 11 kilometres west from Underbool.

The name Linga is believed to be an invented derivative from the traditional Aboriginal name Lar-gni which meant camp of ... because as a place to camp it was a place to linger.

The Post Office (as a receiving office) opened on 15 July 1912 when a regular mail service was provided by the opening of the railway from Ouyen to Murrayville a month earlier. It was called Manpy until 1913 and closed in 1975.

Linga State School (No. 3798) opened on 31 March 1913 in the local hall, with a permanent building erected in 1916. The school closed on 17 December 1970. The building was subsequently sold and relocated to Ouyen.

Linga South State School (No. 4460) opened on 30 January 1930 and closed in 1949.
