= List of places of worship in the Rural City of Mildura =

This is a list of places of worship in the Rural City of Mildura, a local government area in the state of Victoria, Australia. The list includes active and former churches and other religious buildings representing a variety of Christian denominations and other faiths.

St Mark's Anglican Church, Red Cliffs

== Heritage listing status ==
| Style | Status |
|---|---|
| Yes | Listed on the Victorian Heritage Register |
| – | Not listed |

== Current places of worship ==
Current places of worship
| Name | Image | Location | Denomination/ Affiliation | Heritage listing | Notes | Refs |
|---|---|---|---|---|---|---|
| Annunciation of the Virgin Mary Greek Orthodox Church | | Mildura; 34.199330°S 142.146101°E | Greek Orthodox | – | | |
| Mildura Seventh-day Adventist Church | | Mildura; 34.197272°S 142.147159°E | Seventh-day Adventist | – | | |
| Mildura Baptist Church | | Mildura; 34.195308°S 142.151135°E | Baptist | – | | |
| Mildura Tongan Wesleyan Methodist Church | | Mildura; 34.181747°S 142.160098°E | Methodist (Wesleyan) | – | | |
| Mildura Church of Christ | | Mildura; 34.187944°S 142.158565°E | Church of Christ | – | | |
| Mildura Corps (Sunraysia Corps) | | Mildura; 34.206411°S 142.155982°E | Salvation Army | – | | |
| St Andrew's Uniting Church | | Mildura; 34.189356°S 142.156570°E | Uniting (formerly Presbyterian) | – | | |
| Sacred Heart Peace Memorial Catholic Church | | Mildura; 34.188092°S 142.154922°E | Catholic | – | | |
| St Margaret's Anglican Church | | Mildura; 34.190070°S 142.157441°E | Anglican | – | | |
| Riveredge Church | | Mildura; 34.178143°S 142.111640°E | Pentecostal (Australian Christian Churches) | – | | |
| Living Waters Christian Community | | Mildura; 34.189675°S 142.161795°E | Non-denominational | – | | |
| New Life Christian Church | | Mildura; 34.215738°S 142.114800°E | Pentecostal (Australian Christian Churches) | – | | |
| Our Journey Church (formerly Onevine Community Church) | | Mildura; 34.204531°S 142.160191°E | Pentecostal (Christian Revival Church) | – | | |
| Mildura Mosque | | Mildura; 34.194211°S 142.166051°E | Islam | – | | |
| Gurudwara Sahib Mildura | | Mildura; 34.225874°S 142.094364°E | Sikh | – | | |
| Good News Messianic Community, Mildura | | Mildura; 34.172850°S 142.127514°E | Messianic Judaism | – | | |
| Blue Sky Temple | | Mildura; 34.203508°S 142.145110°E | Buddhist | – | | |
| Holy Trinity Lutheran Church | | Mildura; 34.183136°S 142.156356°E | Lutheran | – | | |
| Irymple Uniting Church | | Irymple; 34.228950°S 142.158532°E | Uniting (formerly Methodist) | – | | |
| St Francis Xavier's Catholic Church | | Irymple; 34.235754°S 142.173123°E | Catholic | – | | |
| Our Lady of Compassion Catholic Church | | Irymple; 34.232936°S 142.167291°E | Catholic | – | | |
| St Mark's Anglican Church | | Red Cliffs; 34.306182°S 142.190025°E | Anglican | – | | |
| Red Cliffs Corps | | Red Cliffs; 34.305337°S 142.189163°E | Salvation Army | – | | |
| Diggerland Church | | Red Cliffs; 34.306704°S 142.187710°E | Pentecostal (Christian Revival Centres) | – | | |
| Red Cliffs Church of Christ | | Red Cliffs; 34.310159°S 142.191423°E | Church of Christ | – | | |
| Red Cliffs Uniting Church | | Red Cliffs; 34.305257°S 142.190636°E | Uniting (formerly Methodist) | – | | |
| St Joseph the Worker Catholic Church | | Red Cliffs; 34.301958°S 142.186961°E | Catholic | – | | |
| Merbein Uniting Church | | Merbein; 34.168227°S 142.062850°E | Uniting (formerly Methodist) | – | | |
| Our Lady of the Sacred Heart Catholic Church | | Merbein; 34.166856°S 142.053941°E | Catholic | – | | |
| All Saints' Anglican Church | | Ouyen; 35.065873°S 142.314678°E | Anglican, Uniting | – | | |
| St Joseph's Catholic Church | | Ouyen; 35.067189°S 142.314141°E | Catholic | – | | |
| New Life Christian Church | | Ouyen; 35.070658°S 142.315138°E | Pentecostal (Australian Christian Churches) | – | | |
| Anglican Church of Christ the Worker | | Underbool; 35.172700°S 141.809041°E | Anglican | – | | |
| Our Lady of Fatima Catholic Church | | Underbool; 35.171369°S 141.809280°E | Catholic | – | | |
| Murrayville Uniting Church | | Murrayville; 35.265212°S 141.182326°E | Uniting (formerly Methodist) | – | | |
| St Peter's Lutheran Church, Murrayville | | Murrayville; 35.265570°S 141.187660°E | Lutheran | – | | |
| St Peter's Lutheran Church, Walpeup | | Walpeup; 35.138666°S 142.026183°E | Lutheran | – | | |
| Walpeup Uniting & Anglican Church | | Walpeup; 35.136394°S 142.025516°E | Uniting, Anglican (formerly Methodist) | – | | |
| Our Lady of Lourdes Catholic Church | | Werrimull; 34.391839°S 141.597682°E | Catholic | Yes | | |
| Cowangie Uniting Church | | Cowangie; 35.234093°S 141.379108°E | Uniting (formerly Methodist) | – | | |

== Former places of worship ==
Former places of worship
| Name | Image | Location | Denomination/ Affiliation | Heritage listing | Notes | Refs |
|---|---|---|---|---|---|---|
| St Luke's Anglican Church | | Irymple; 34.234732°S 142.171302°E | Anglican | – | | |
| Mildura Methodist Church | | Mildura; 34.188517°S 142.159183°E | Methodist (Wesleyan) | Yes | | |
| St John's Anglican Church | | Merbein; 34.166770°S 142.056761°E | Anglican | – | | |
| Ouyen Presbyterian Church | | Ouyen; 35.068273°S 142.313071°E | Presbyterian | – | | |
| Torrita Methodist Church | | Ouyen; 35.069214°S 142.315484°E | Methodist (formerly Presbyterian) | – | Relocated from Berriwillock to Torrita, then to Ouyen | |
| Underbool Uniting Church | | Underbool; 35.172191°S 141.807966°E | Uniting (formerly Methodist) | – | | |
| St John the Baptist Anglican Church | | Murrayville; 35.265823°S 141.181994°E | Anglican | – | | |
| St Teresa's Catholic Church | | Murrayville; 35.266477°S 141.183688°E | Catholic | – | | |
| Sacred Heart Catholic Church | | Walpeup; 35.139229°S 142.024810°E | Catholic | – | | |
| All Saints' Anglican Church, Meringur | | Meringur; 34.388812°S 141.337129°E | Anglican | – | | |
| St John's Lutheran Church | | Meringur; 34.387934°S 141.332730°E | Lutheran | – | | |
| Millewa Uniting Church | | Werrimull; 34.388974°S 141.597566°E | Uniting (formerly Methodist) | – | | |

== See also ==
- List of places of worship in Golden Plains Shire
- List of places of worship in Southern Grampians Shire
- List of places of worship in the City of Greater Geelong
