= List of places on the Victorian Heritage Register in the Rural City of Mildura =

This is a list of places on the Victorian Heritage Register in the Rural City of Mildura in Victoria, Australia. The Victorian Heritage Register is maintained by the Heritage Council of Victoria.

The Victorian Heritage Register, as of 2020, lists the following 14 state-registered places within the Rural City of Mildura:

Place name	Place #	Location	Suburb or Town	Co-ordinates	Built	State registered	Photo
Big Lizzie	H1919	cnr Calder Hwy and Jamieson Ave	Red Cliffs	34.307960°S 142.186820°E	1915	15 March 2001	
Billabong Pumping Station	H0547	Cooke St	Nichols Point	34.229890°S 142.219870°E	1889	26 October 1983	
Horticulture Research Station	H2316	571-585 River Ave	Merbein South	34.212610°S 142.041680°E	1919	13 December 2012	
Irymple railway station	H1568	Railway Crescent	Irymple	34.240600°S 142.172250°E	1903	20 August 1982	
Kow Plains Homestead	H0688	99 Cowangie South Rd	Cowangie	35.239970°S 141.391700°E	1879	15 June 1988	
Lock Nine Pumping Station	H0549	Lock 9 Rd	Cullulleraine	34.191290°S 141.603630°E	1926	26 October 1983	
Methodist Church	H0588	126-132A Deakin Ave	Mildura	34.188660°S 142.159170°E	1912	3 October 1984	
Mildara Blass Distillery	H1099	2 Wentworth Rd	Merbein	34.167030°S 142.079920°E	1913	14 September 1995	
Murrayville Consolidated School	H1185	27 Poole St	Murrayville	35.264740°S 141.180370°E	1943	19 December 1996	
Murrayville railway station	H1580	McKenzie St	Murrayville	35.261460°S 141.183220°E	1912	20 August 1982	
Old Mildura Base Hospital	H1934	137-157 Thirteenth St	Mildura	34.190970°S 142.151250°E	1934	10 May 2001	
Old Nichols Point Primary School Shelter Shed	H2363	110 Koorlong Ave	Nichols Point	34.209960°S 142.203040°E	1911	14 July 2016	
Psyche Bend Pumping Station	H0548	Psyche Bend Rd	Irymple	34.253480°S 142.230760°E	1891	26 October 1983	
Rio Vista	H0729	199-205 Cureton Ave	Mildura	34.177340°S 142.158630°E	1889	3 May 1989	
