= Ouyen railway station =

Former railway station in Victoria, Australia

Ouyen
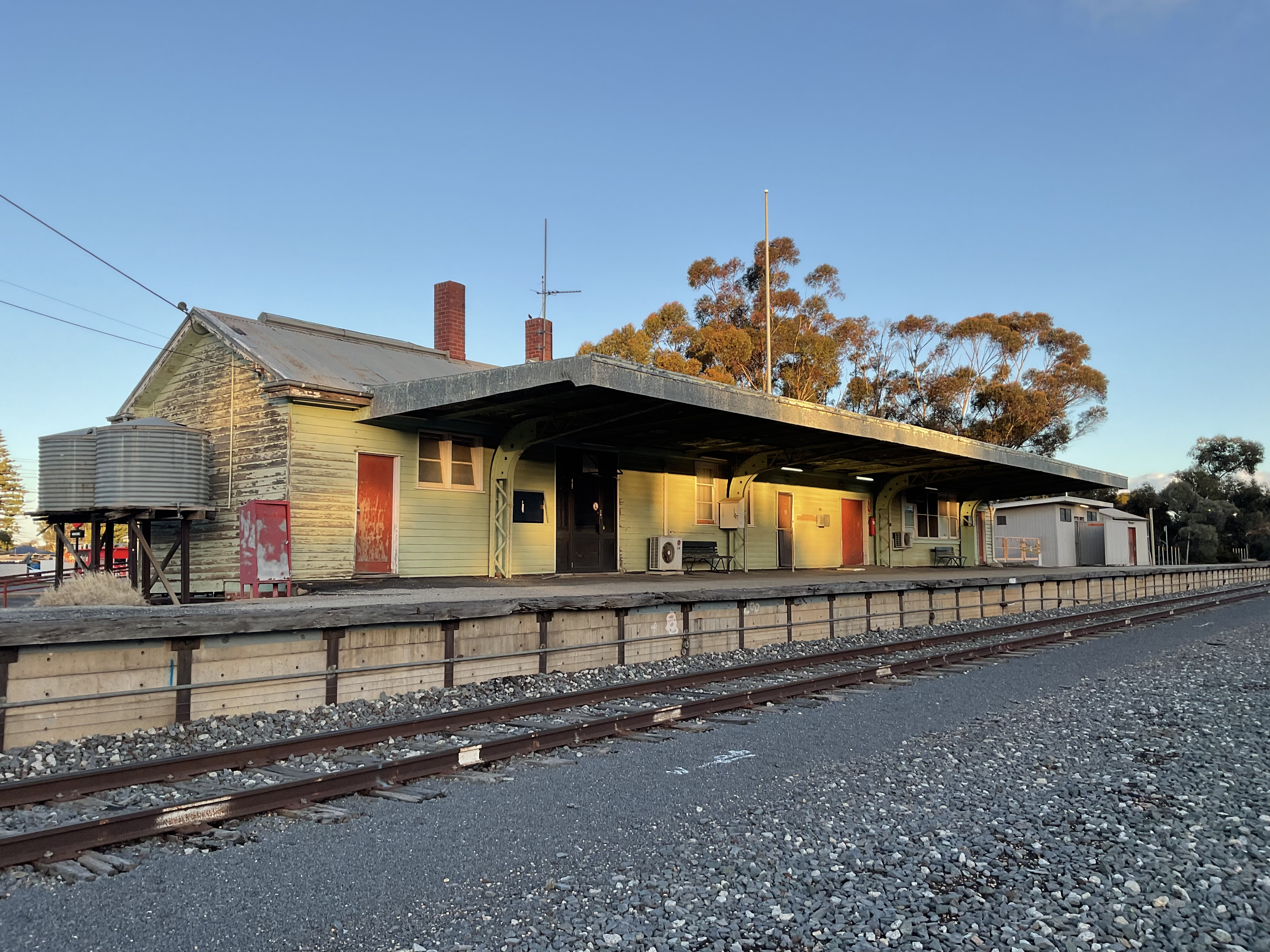
- Southbound view of the station in June 2023

General information
- Coordinates: 35°04′12″S 142°19′04″E
- Line: Mildura
- Platforms: 1
- Tracks: 4

Other information
- Status: Closed

History
- Opened: 1903
- Closed: 12 September 1993

Services
Preceding station	Disused railways	Following station
Speed	Mildura line	Red Cliffs
Junction	Pinnaroo line	Underbool
	List of closed railway stations in Victoria	
Location
- Location within Victoria

Ouyen is a closed railway station in Ouyen, on the Mildura railway line, in Victoria, Australia. The station is the junction for the Pinnaroo line westward to Panitya and Pinnaroo.

The station opened on 15 January 1903, along with the line from Woomelang to Hattah. No facilities were provided. The line from Ouyen to Murrayville opened on 25 June 1912. In 1913, a 53' turntable was provided, the yard at this time consisting of six through roads and a number of dead-end sidings. A station building and goods shed also existed at this time. Grain silos were provided at the station in the 1930s. From 1948, a railcar passenger service was provided to Pinnaroo, with the service operating in November 1968. The turntable was removed the following year. Services to Mildura continued through to September 1993, at which point the station was closed to passengers.

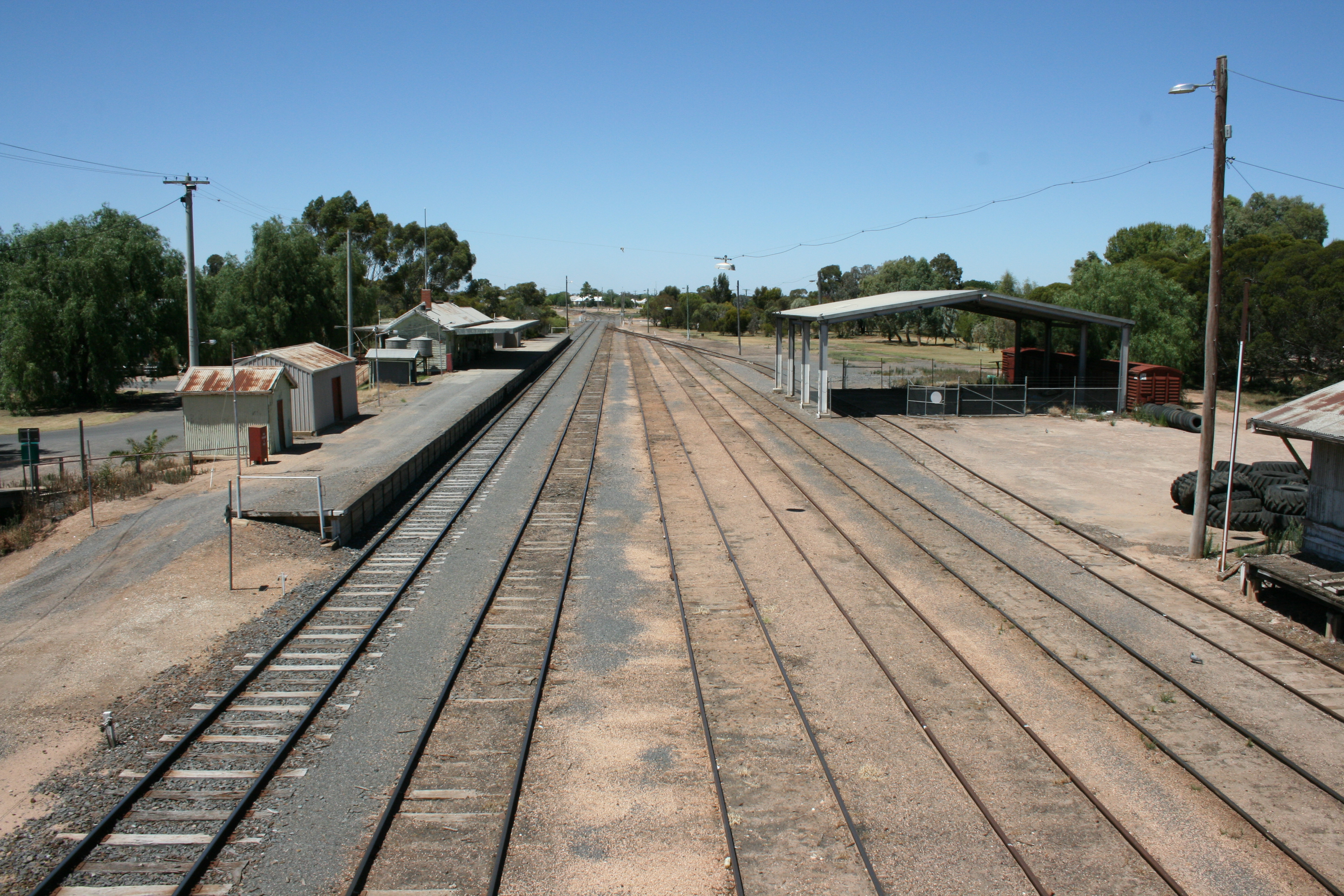
Station view looking towards Melbourne from the pedestrian overpass in January 2012

Flashing lights were provided at the Mallee Highway (known then as the Ouyen Highway) level crossing, located at the up end of the station, in 1973.

Following Murray Basin Rail Project works, involving the conversion of the Mildura line to standard gauge, the yard was reduced to two through roads and a single dead end siding, in addition to the main running line.

On the 19th of October 2026, the Victorian Liberals and Nationals committed to restoring V/Line passenger rail service to Ouyen by 2029 if they won the November 2026 Victorian election.
