= Mulcra =

Mulcra Victoria
- Coordinates: 35°11′S 141°6′E
- Postcode(s): 3512
- Elevation: 81 m (266 ft)
- Location: 558 km (347 mi) from Melbourne; 235 km (146 mi) from Mildura; 12 km (7 mi) from Sunset; 8 km (5 mi) from Carina
- LGA(s): Rural City of Mildura
- State electorate(s): Mildura
- Federal division(s): Mallee

Mulcra is a locality in the Sunraysia region of Victoria (Australia). The place is about 7 kilometres (4 mi) by road north from Carina and 12 kilometres (7 mi) south-east from Sunset. It is in the local government area of the Rural City of Mildura.
