= Ngallo =

Coordinates: 35°19′0″S 141°3′0″E

- Town
- Country: Australia
- State: Victoria
- LGA: Rural City of Mildura
- Location: 572 km (355 mi) from Melbourne; 250 km (160 mi) from Mildura; 14 km (8.7 mi) from Carina; 12 km (7.5 mi) from Panitya
- Established: 104

Government
  - State electorate: Mildura
  - Federal division: Mallee
- Postcode: 3512

Ngallo is an Australian locality. The place by road, is situated about 12 kilometres south from Panitya and 14 kilometres south from Carina. It is in the local government area of the Rural City of Mildura.

== Sport ==
Ngallo had a football team for many decades in the Pinnaroo league and recently in the Mallee Football League called the Ngallo Demons until the club folded in 2000, due to lack of players. Their old home ground can be found near the Panitya silos.
