= Boinka =

- Town
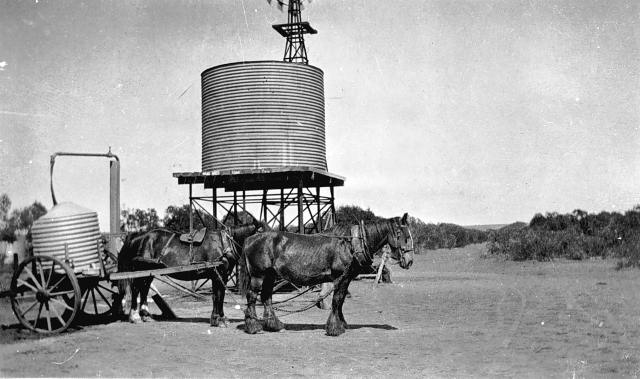
- 1925 – Filling tanks from the main water supply of Boinka

- Coordinates: 35°12′14″S 141°36′38″E
- Country: Australia
- State: Victoria
- LGA: Rural City of Mildura
- Location: 496 km (308 mi) from Melbourne; 174 km (108 mi) from Mildura; 8 km (5.0 mi) from Linga; 4 km (2.5 mi) from Tutye

Population
  - Total: 13 (2016 census)
- Postcode: 3490
Localities around Boinka
Murray-Sunset	Murray-Sunset	Murray-Sunset
Tutye	Boinka	Linga
Big Desert	Big Desert	Big Desert

Boinka is a locality situated on the section of the Mallee Highway and Pinnaroo railway line between Ouyen and the South Australian border in the Sunraysia region of Victoria, Australia. Boinka is situated approximately 4 kilometres east from Tutye and 8 kilometres west from Linga.

The name Boinka means "flat black beetle" in the language of the indigenous people of Lake Hindmarsh.

The location has a rich history of settlement and is the subject of a photograph collection within the archives of the Museum of Victoria. The Boinka State School (No 3800) is listed as a part of Heritage Victoria – owned by the Crown Reserve and managed by Rural City Council of Mildura. The township was established in the early 1910s, and the Post Office opened on 15 July 1912 when a regular mail service was provided by the opening of the railway from Ouyen to Murrayville a month earlier. The office closed in 1975. The railway station closed a year later, on 30 June 1976.

== Unique facts ==
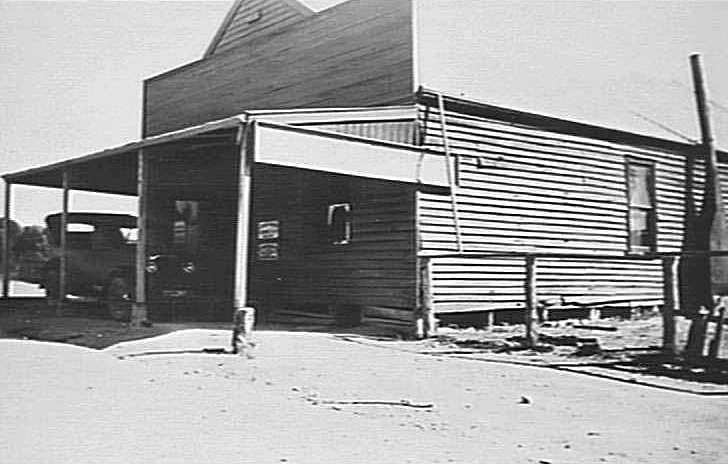
1940 – Boinka Streetscape

Boinka is listed within the Victorian Flora and Fauna Guarantee Act of 1988 as being one of only two places where Pale Myoporum (Myoporum brevipes Benth.), a recumbent or erect shrub of up to 2 metres in height (widespread in South Australia), is known to grow indigenously outside of that location.
