= Torrita, Victoria =

Torrita
- Town
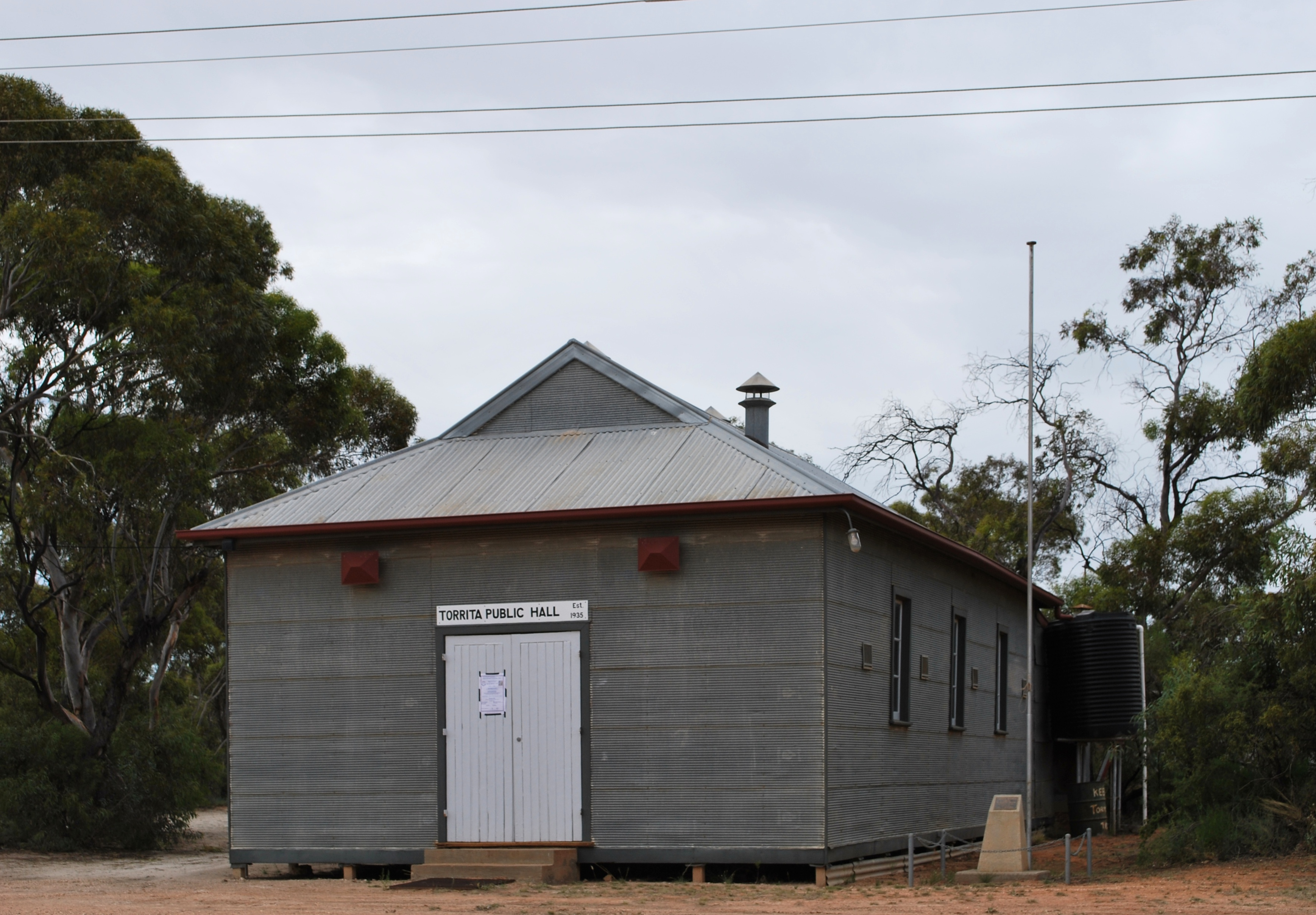
- Public hall, built in 1935

- Coordinates: 35°08′07″S 141°54′21″E
- Country: Australia
- State: Victoria
- LGA: Rural City of Mildura
- Location: 481 km (299 mi) from Melbourne; 138 km (86 mi) from Swan Hill; 13 km (8.1 mi) from Underbool; 8 km (5.0 mi) from Walpeup

Government
  - State electorate: Mildura
  - Federal division: Mallee
- Elevation: 75 m (246 ft)

Population
  - Total: 32 (2016 census)
- Postcode: 3490
Localities around Torrita
Murray-Sunset	Murray-Sunset	Murray-Sunset
Underbool	Torrita	Walpeup
Big Desert	Big Desert	Patchewollock

Torrita is a locality situated on the Mallee Highway and Pinnaroo railway line section between Ouyen and the South Australian border in the Sunraysia region. The place by road is about 13 kilometres east of Underbool and 8 kilometres west of Walpeup.

A Post Office opened on 15 July 1912 when regular mail service was provided by the opening of the railway from Ouyen to Murrayville a month earlier, but it was known as Nyang until 1921 and closed in 1984. The name Nyang is preserved in the Nyang Flora Reserve to the south of the highway.

Nyang State School (No. 3871) opened in the public hall on 31 September 1914 and received a purpose-built one-room school in 1920. It was renamed Torritata State School on 20 October 1921. The school closed in 1969, and the building was later moved to Walpeup as an art room.

The locality area contains the smaller area of Kattyong and, to the south, the smaller area of Gunner.

Kattyong State School (No. 3962) opened on 4 October 1917 and closed on 19 February 1967. Kattyong West State School (No. 4321) opened in May 1928 and closed in 1942, with the school building moved to Mittyack.
