= Danyo =

Danyo Victoria
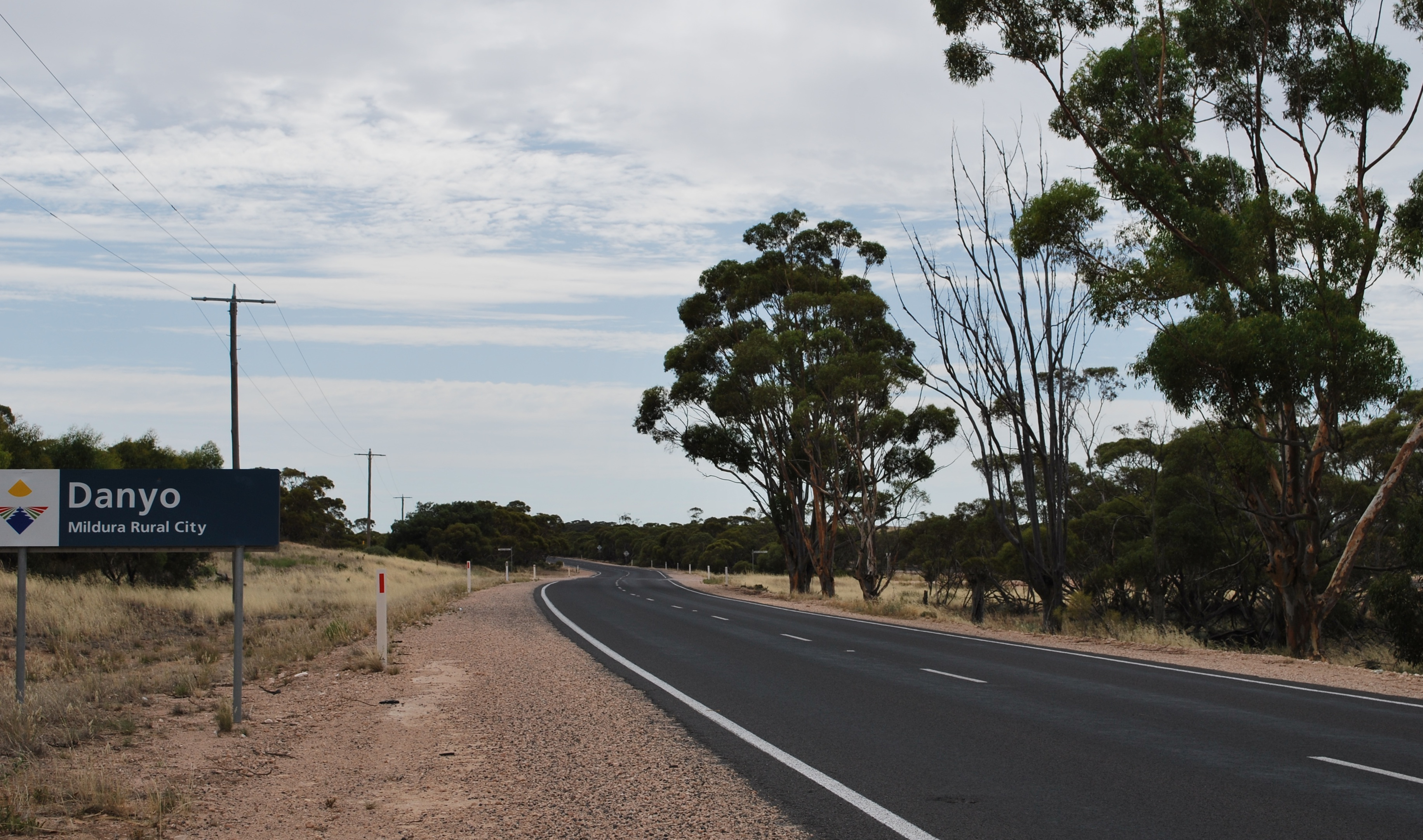
- Entering Danyo

- Coordinates: 35°15′30″S 141°17′27″E
- Postcode(s): 3512
- Elevation: 95 m (312 ft)
- Location: 522 km (324 mi) from Melbourne; 199 km (124 mi) from Mildura; 14 km (9 mi) from Murrayville; 12 km (7 mi) from Cowangie
- LGA(s): Rural City of Mildura
- State electorate(s): Mildura
- Federal division(s): Mallee

Danyo is a locality on the section of the Mallee Highway between Ouyen and the South Australian border. The place by road is situated about 12 kilometres east from Cowangie and 14 kilometres west from Murrayville. It is in the local government area of the Rural City of Mildura.

The Post Office opened on 15 July 1912 when a regular mail service was provided by the opening of the railway from Ouyen to Murrayville a month earlier. The office closed in 1975.
