= Murrayville railway station =

Former railway station in Victoria, Australia

Murrayville

General information
- Location: Australia
- Coordinates: 35.2612°S 141.1860°E
- Line: Pinnaroo
- Platforms: 1

Other information
- Status: Closed

History
- Opened: 1912

Services
Preceding station	Disused railways	Following station
Cowangie	Pinnaroo line	Carina
	List of closed railway stations in Victoria	
Location

Murrayville Railway Station was the railway station servicing the town of Murrayville in Victoria, Australia.

The station was constructed in 1912 on the Pinnaroo railway line for the Victorian Railways. It comprises a standard, single storey, timber weatherboard, portable station building with ventilated double gable roof and an attached waiting area. Other structures include the corrugated iron clad goods shed and two van goods sheds. The water tower, toilet shed and store to the station platform have been demolished, while a loading ramp and a set of railway tracks have also been removed.

The station buildings are currently leased by the local shire council
