= Tutye =

- Town
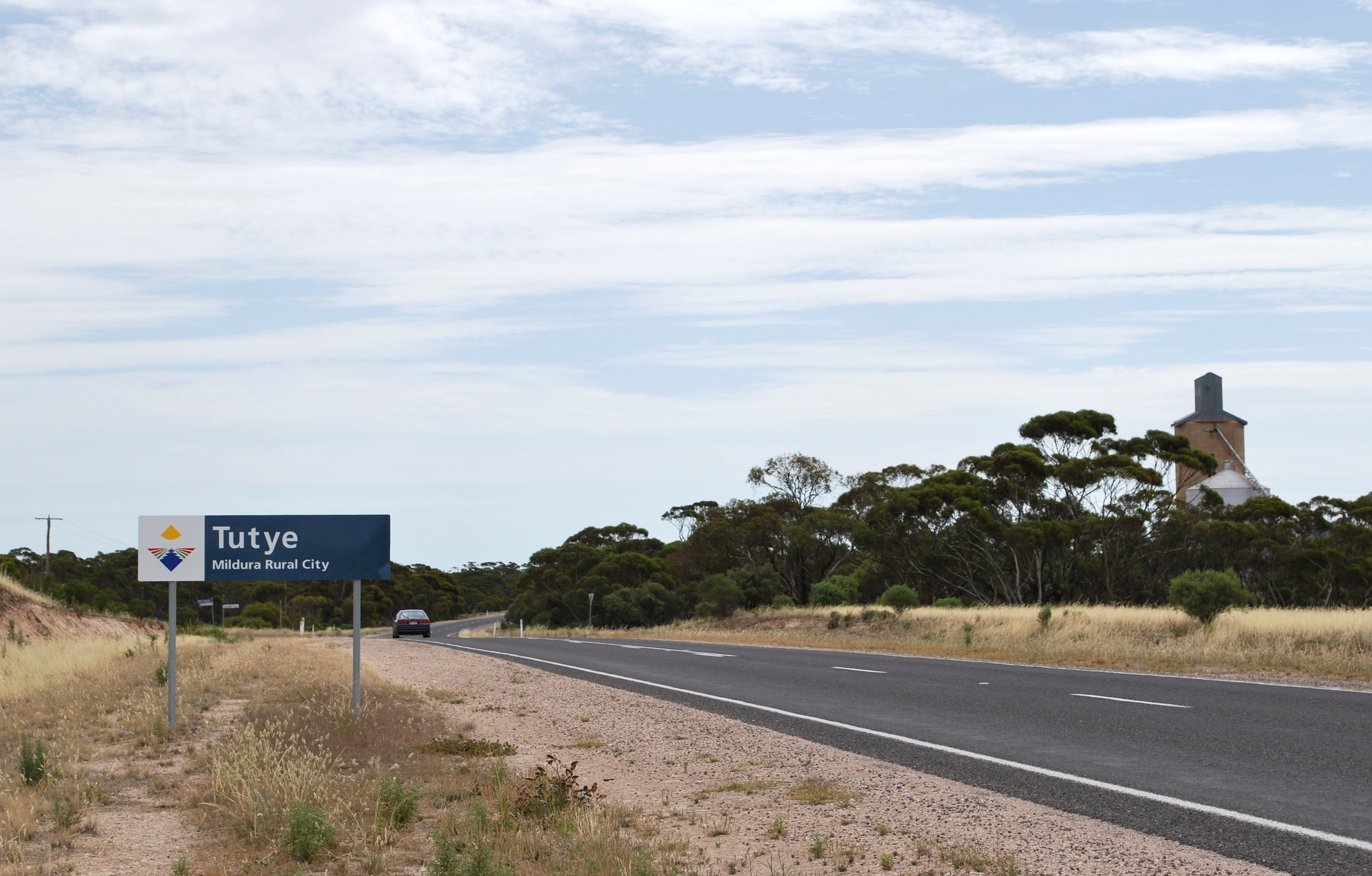
- Entering Tutye. 2010

- Coordinates: 35°12′53″S 141°29′54″E
- Country: Australia
- State: Victoria
- LGA: Rural City of Mildura
- Location: 498 km (309 mi) from Melbourne; 175 km (109 mi) from Mildura; 12 km (7.5 mi) from Cowangie; 9 km (5.6 mi) from Boinka

Government
  - State electorate: Mildura
  - Federal division: Mallee
- Elevation: 96 m (315 ft)

Population
  - Total: 20 (2016 census)
- Postcode: 3490
Localities around Tutye
Murray-Sunset	Murray-Sunset	Boinka
Cowangie	Tutye	Boinka
Big Desert	Big Desert	Big Desert

Tutye is a locality in the Mallee region of Victoria, Australia, situated on the Mallee Highway between Ouyen and the South Australian border. it is about 9 kilometres south-east of Boinka and 12 kilometres north-west of Cowangie.

Tutye is an Aboriginal word meaning "rest". The area became available for selection in 1911 and a township site was laid out. A post office was opened on 15 July 1912, after a regular mail service was provided by the opening of the railway line from Ouyen to Murrayville a month earlier. A railway station was opened with the line in June 1912.

There was a general store, blacksmith shop, boot repairer, bank agency, boarding house and telephone exchange, as well as a football club, tennis club, croquet club, golf club, racecourse, and dramatic society.

Tutye State School was officially opened in 1920, although it had been in operation since 1914.

The rail passenger service ceased in November 1968, and the station was closed with the line in 1996. The post office closed in 1980. The cemetery is one of the few remaining signs of the former settlement.

The locality includes the smaller area of Tyalla.
