= Torrita =

Torrita may refer to:

- Torrita, Victoria, locality situated on the section of the Mallee Highway and Pinnaroo railway line between Ouyen and the South Australian border in the Sunraysia region
- Torrita di Siena, municipality in the province of Siena in the Italian region Tuscany
- Torrita Tiberina, municipality in the Metropolitan City of Rome in the Italian region Lazio
