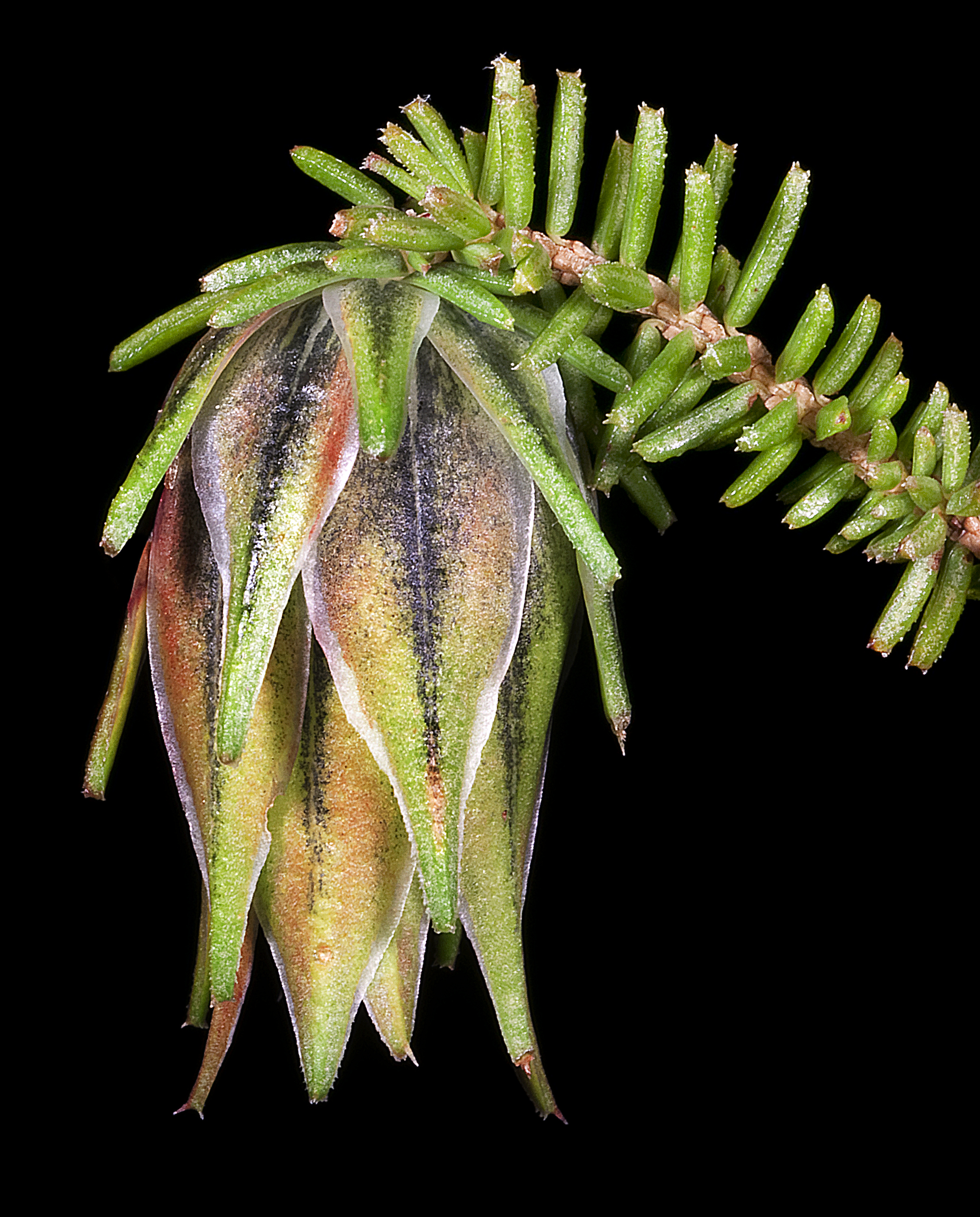

Scientific classification
- Kingdom: Plantae
- Clade: Tracheophytes
- Clade: Angiosperms
- Clade: Eudicots
- Clade: Rosids
- Order: Myrtales
- Family: Myrtaceae
- Genus: Darwinia
- Species: D. helichrysoides

Binomial name
- Darwinia helichrysoides (Meisn.) Benth.
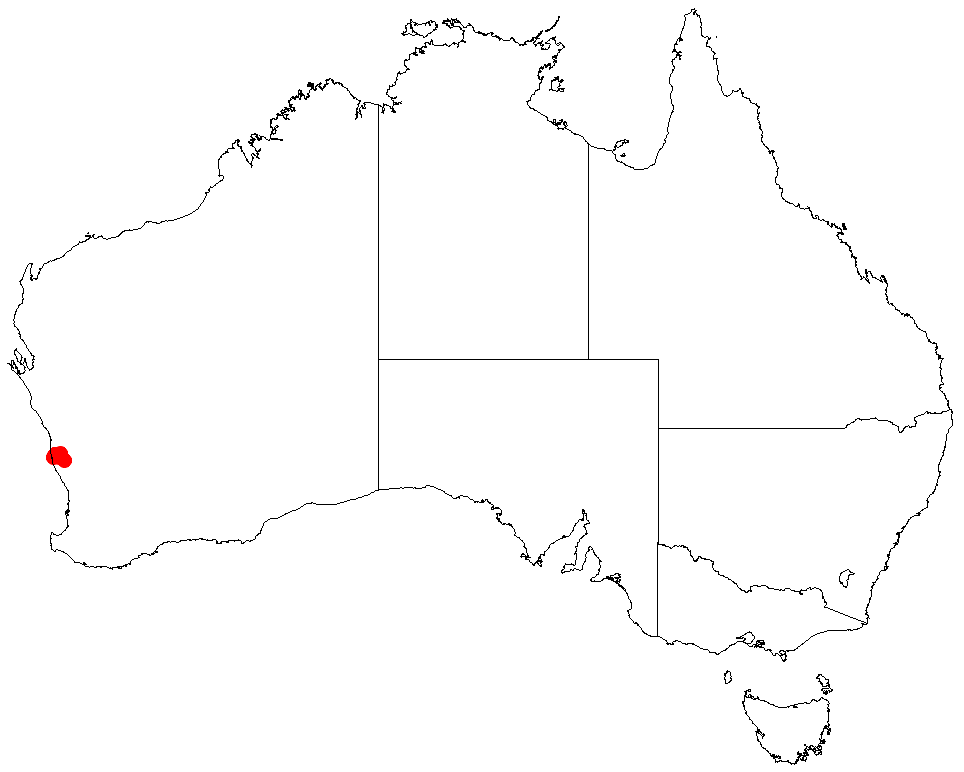
- Occurrence data from AVH

Synonyms
- Genetyllis helichrysoides Meisn.

= Darwinia helichrysoides =

Species of flowering plant

Darwinia helichrysoides is a species of flowering plant in the myrtle family Myrtaceae and is endemic to a small area in south-west of Western Australia. It is a slender shrub with linear leaves and drooping heads of about 4 red and green flowers surrounded by many glabrous bracts.

== Description ==
Darwinia helichrysoides is a slender, erect shrub that typically grows to a height of 20–50 cm (7.9–19.7 in). Its leaves are linear, spreading, triangular to round in cross-section, 4–6.5 mm (0.16–0.26 in) long. The flowers are arranged in groups of about 4 surrounded by many red and green, egg-shaped to lance-shaped bracts forming an involucre nearly 25 mm (0.98 in) long. The sepals are more than 6 mm (0.24 in) long and joined at the base but without prominent ribs and the petals are about 2 mm (0.079 in) long. Flowering occurs from August to November.

== Taxonomy ==
This species was first formally described in 1857 by Carl Meissner, who gave it the name Genetyllis helichrysoides in the Journal of the Proceedings of the Linnean Society, Botany, from specimens collected by James Drummond. In 1865, George Bentham changed the name to Darwinia helichrysoides in the Journal of the Proceedings of the Linnean Society, Botany. The specific epithet (helichrysoides ) means "Helichrysum-like".

== Distribution and habitat ==
Darwinia helichrysoides is found in the uplands in a small area between Coorow and Dandaragan where the Geraldton Sandplain meets the Swan Coastal Plain where it grows in gravelly lateritic soils.
