= Berrook =

Berrook Victoria
- Coordinates: 34°57′15″S 141°01′02″E
- Postcode(s): 3512
- Location: 602 km (374 mi) from Melbourne; 280 km (174 mi) from Mildura; 30 km (19 mi) from Sunset; 8 km (5 mi) from Peebinga
- LGA(s): Rural City of Mildura
- State electorate(s): Mildura
- Federal division(s): Mallee

Berrook is a locality situated in remote north-west Victoria in the Millewa region. The place by road, about 8 kilometres east from Peebinga South Australia and only about 3 kilometres from the South Australian Border. It can be found by following the Panitya-Berrook unsealed road north for 30 kilometres from Sunset. It is in the local government area of Mildura.

Berrook is near the south-west areas of the Murray-Sunset National Park.

Berrook Post Office opened on 18 February 1929 and closed in 1935.
