= Pinnaroo railway station =

Former railway station in South Australia, Australia

Pinnaroo
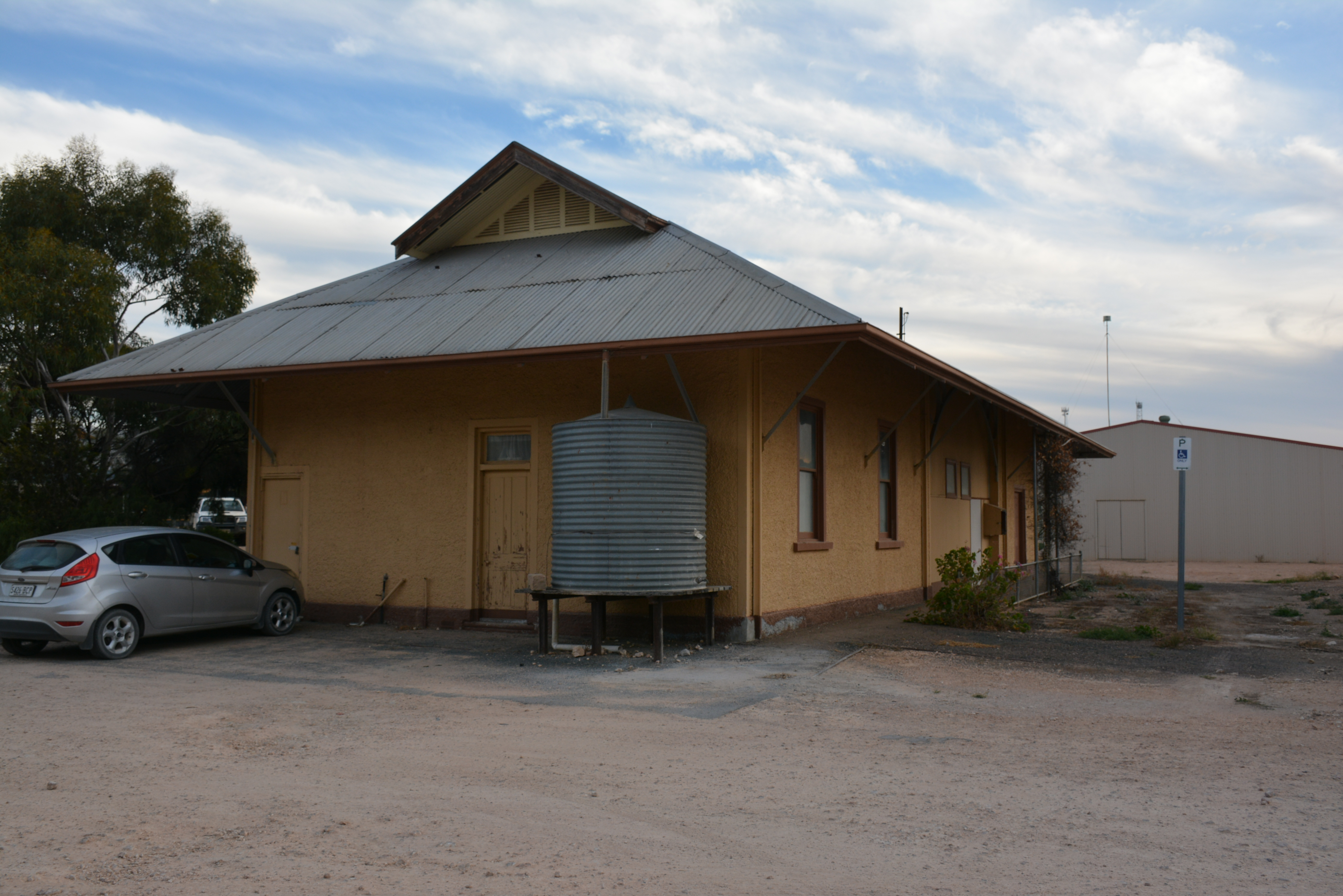
- Pinnaroo railway station (2017)

General information
- Location: Railway Terrace, Pinnaroo, South Australia
- Coordinates: 35.25983167548555°S 140.9075654557561°E
- Operator: South Australian Railways
- Line: Pinnaroo line
- Distance: 242 kilometres from Adelaide
- Platforms: 1
- Tracks: 1

Construction
- Structure type: Ground

Other information
- Status: Closed to passengers, now used as a museum

History
- Opened: 14 September 1906
- Closed: 1968 (passengers); 31 July 2015 (freight)

Services
Preceding station	Aurizon	Following station
Chandos towards Adelaide	Pinnaroo railway line, South Australia	Panitya Terminus
Location

Pinnaroo railway station was located on the Pinnaroo railway line from Tailem Bend to Ouyen. It served the town of Pinnaroo.

== History ==
Pinnaroo station opened on 14 September 1906 when the broad gauge railway line opened from Tailem Bend to Pinnaroo. It was eventually connected to Victoria with the opening of a broad gauge branch line from the Mildura railway line at Ouyen on 29 July 1915. Its name derived from a native term used to express "big man". The station consisted of a platform and a main building.

Regular passenger services ceased in 1968.

The South Australian section of the Pinnaroo line was gauge converted from broad gauge to standard gauge on 25 November 1998 thus making Pinnaroo a break of gauge station.

In 1997, the station and railway line were included in the transfer of Australian National's South Australian freight assets to Australian Southern Railroad (later known as One Rail Australia.) The line became disused in July 2015 when grain handler Viterra announced that no more grain would be carried by rail with the 2015 harvest to be entirely transported by road. As the South Australian line became disused, the Victorian government was upgrading part of its end of the line for regional freight. The lease of the land and ownership of the rail infrastructure passed to Aurizon in 2022, following their purchase of One Rail Australia (the final successor of Australian Southern Railroad).

The station building is now used as part of the Tourist Information Centre and Mallee Heritage Museum.
