= SHV =

SHV may refer to:

- Select Harvests, Australia, ASX symbol
- Shreveport Regional Airport, IATA code
- South View LRT station, Singapore, LRT station abbreviation
- South Hills Village, a shopping mall in Pittsburgh, Pennsylvania
  - South Hills Village station, a Pittsburgh light rail station adjacent to the mall
- Sutter Hill Ventures, an American private equity firm
- SHV connector, safe high-voltage
- SHV Holdings, a Dutch trading company
- Super Hi-Vision, 8K Ultra HD TV
- Frauen SHV-Cup/SHV-Cup, handball tournament in Switzerland
