= Manya, Victoria =

Manya Victoria
- Coordinates: 35°4′S 141°2′E
- Postcode(s): 3512
- Location: 569 km (354 mi) from Melbourne; 246 km (153 mi) from Mildura; 9 km (6 mi) from Panitya; 6 km (4 mi) from Sunset
- LGA(s): Rural City of Mildura
- State electorate(s): Mildura
- Federal division(s): Mallee

Manya is a locality situated in the Sunraysia region and close to the border of South Australia. The place by road, is situated about 9 kilometres (5.6 mi) north from Panitya and 6 kilometres (3.7 mi) south from Sunset.

The place name Manya is derived from the local Aboriginal word meaning "the hand".
