= Big Desert, Victoria =

Big Desert
- Town
- Coordinates: 35°28′33″S 141°17′35″E
- Country: Australia
- State: Victoria
- LGAs: Rural City of Mildura; Shire of West Wimmera; Shire of Hindmarsh

Government
  - State electorate: Mildura
  - Federal division: Mallee

Population
  - Total: 0 (2016 census)
- Postcode: 3418, 3490
Localities around Big Desert
Panitya; Carina; Murrayville	Cowangie; Tutye; Boinka; Linga	Underbool; Torrita; Walpeup
South Australia	Big Desert	Patchewollock; Yaapeet; Albacutya
South Australia; Telopea Downs	Yanac; Netherby	Rainbow

Big Desert is a locality in the Australian state of Victoria located in the state's west adjoining the border with South Australia within the local government areas of the Shire of Hindmarsh, the Rural City of Mildura and the Shire of West Wimmera. The principal land use is conservation with part of the locality being occupied by the following protected areas:

- Big Desert Wilderness Park
- Wyperfeld National Park.

== See also ==
- Little Desert, Victoria
