= Walpeup =

- Town
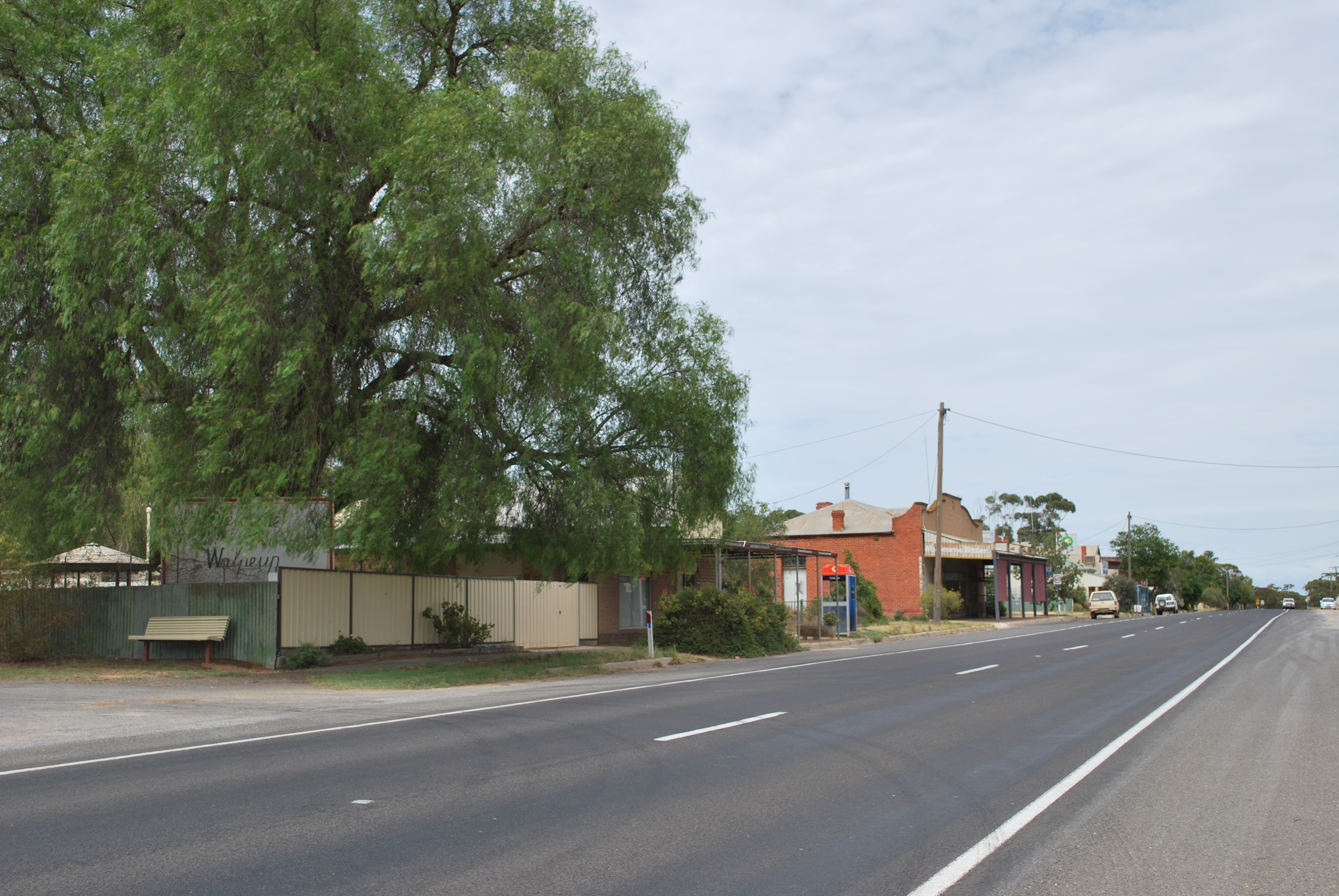
- The Mallee Highway at Walpeup

- Coordinates: 35°08′10″S 142°01′30″E
- Country: Australia
- State: Victoria
- LGA: Rural City of Mildura
- Location: 458 km (285 mi) NW of Melbourne; 130 km (81 mi) SW of Mildura; 29 km (18 mi) W of Ouyen

Government
  - State electorate: Mildura
  - Federal division: Mallee
- Elevation: 69 m (226 ft)

Population
  - Total: 158 (2016 census)
- Postcode: 3507
Localities around Walpeup
Murray-Sunset	Ouyen	Ouyen
Torrita	Walpeup	Ouyen
Big Desert	Patchewollock	Patchewollock

Walpeup /wɔːlpiːˈʌp/ is a town in the Mallee region of north west Victoria. The town is in the Rural City of Mildura local government area and on the Mallee Highway and Pinnaroo railway line between Ouyen and the South Australian border, 458 kilometres (285 mi) north west of the state capital, Melbourne and 130 kilometres (81 mi) south west of the regional centre of Mildura. At the 2016 census, Walpeup had a population of 158.

== History ==
The township was settled when the railway arrived, a full post office opening on 16 December 1912. The area of the locality contains the smaller area of Paigne which had a post office open from 1912 until 1916.

== Education ==
The Mallee Research Station at Walpeup was established in 1922 to research dryland farming in the Mallee. It is a campus of the Sunraysia Institute of TAFE. It also has a Bureau of Meteorology automatic weather station.

Walpeup Primary School opened on 3 June 1912 in the "Little White Hall", with a one-room school building being built in 1914. A second room was added in 1927. The school was "de-staffed" from April 2015, with the last five students having to transfer to Underbool school.

Walpeup South State School (No. 3929), alternatively known as Hungry Hut, opened in 1912 and closed in 1951. The building was later moved and served as the dressing shed at the Walpeup Recreation Reserve.

== Facilities ==
The main tourist attractions in Walpeup are the Walpeup Memorial Hall (Glen Street) and the Dryland Gardens (Creagan Street). The Hall houses a large collection of historic photographs of locals who served in either World War, a "welcome home" banner from the First World War — only found within the last five years and now restored and displayed — and a hand-sewn community mural tapestry created in 1989. The Dryland Gardens, on the corner of Glen and Creagan streets, display many native trees and shrubs from around the local region and Australia, particularly a large variety of Eremophilas. The garden is tended by local volunteers.

Water at the Wayside stop is not potable. Fresh water tank is located outside the Memorial Hall in Glen St for travellers to fill their tanks with clean water suitable for drinking cooking and cleaning teeth. Travellers can stay in their own caravans or tents at the wayside stop on the corner of Creagan Street and Murphy Road. The wayside stop contains a covered barbecue area as well as fully maintained play equipment and lawn. General Store is open Monday to Friday closes 5pm. Limited supplies are available. Post office contained within the General Store open 5.5 hrs daily. No weekend trade. Within 100 metres of the wayside stop is Shubert's Walk, a nature walk displaying many native trees and shrubs in their natural setting.

== Sport ==
With its neighbouring township Underbool, Walpeup used to field Australian rules football teams (Walpeup-Underbool) in the Mallee Football League until the league was disbanded at the end of 2015. Golfers play at the course of the Walpeup Golf Club on Patchewollock Road.

== Climate ==
Both Walpeup and Hopetoun hold the all-time Victorian maximum temperature record (since 1910), having recorded 48.9 °C (120.0 °F) on 27 January 2026 during a severe heat wave.

Climate data for Walpeup, elev. 105 m (344 ft) (1991–2020, extremes 1965–2026)
Month	Jan	Feb	Mar	Apr	May	Jun	Jul	Aug	Sep	Oct	Nov	Dec	Year
Record high °C (°F)	48.9 (120.0)	48.1 (118.6)	42.6 (108.7)	38.9 (102.0)	30.0 (86.0)	25.4 (77.7)	27.0 (80.6)	29.7 (85.5)	35.4 (95.7)	40.2 (104.4)	45.2 (113.4)	47.7 (117.9)	48.9 (120.0)
Mean daily maximum °C (°F)	32.8 (91.0)	32.1 (89.8)	28.4 (83.1)	23.7 (74.7)	19.0 (66.2)	15.6 (60.1)	15.0 (59.0)	16.8 (62.2)	20.3 (68.5)	24.3 (75.7)	28.0 (82.4)	30.5 (86.9)	23.9 (75.0)
Mean daily minimum °C (°F)	15.9 (60.6)	15.7 (60.3)	13.1 (55.6)	10.4 (50.7)	7.9 (46.2)	5.9 (42.6)	5.0 (41.0)	5.3 (41.5)	7.1 (44.8)	9.1 (48.4)	11.9 (53.4)	14.0 (57.2)	10.1 (50.2)
Record low °C (°F)	5.0 (41.0)	4.2 (39.6)	3.8 (38.8)	0.6 (33.1)	−0.9 (30.4)	−1.0 (30.2)	−2.0 (28.4)	−2.2 (28.0)	−2.2 (28.0)	0.3 (32.5)	1.3 (34.3)	3.2 (37.8)	−2.2 (28.0)
Average rainfall mm (inches)	26.3 (1.04)	20.6 (0.81)	14.4 (0.57)	23.1 (0.91)	23.4 (0.92)	27.5 (1.08)	28.2 (1.11)	30.7 (1.21)	31.8 (1.25)	24.4 (0.96)	26.4 (1.04)	29.3 (1.15)	306.3 (12.06)
Average rainy days (≥ 1.0 mm)	2.7	2.1	2.0	2.5	4.1	5.3	6.4	6.3	5.0	4.2	3.7	3.4	47.7
Source 1: Australian Bureau of Meteorology
Source 2: Australian Broadcasting Corporation
