= Carina, Victoria =

Carina
- Town
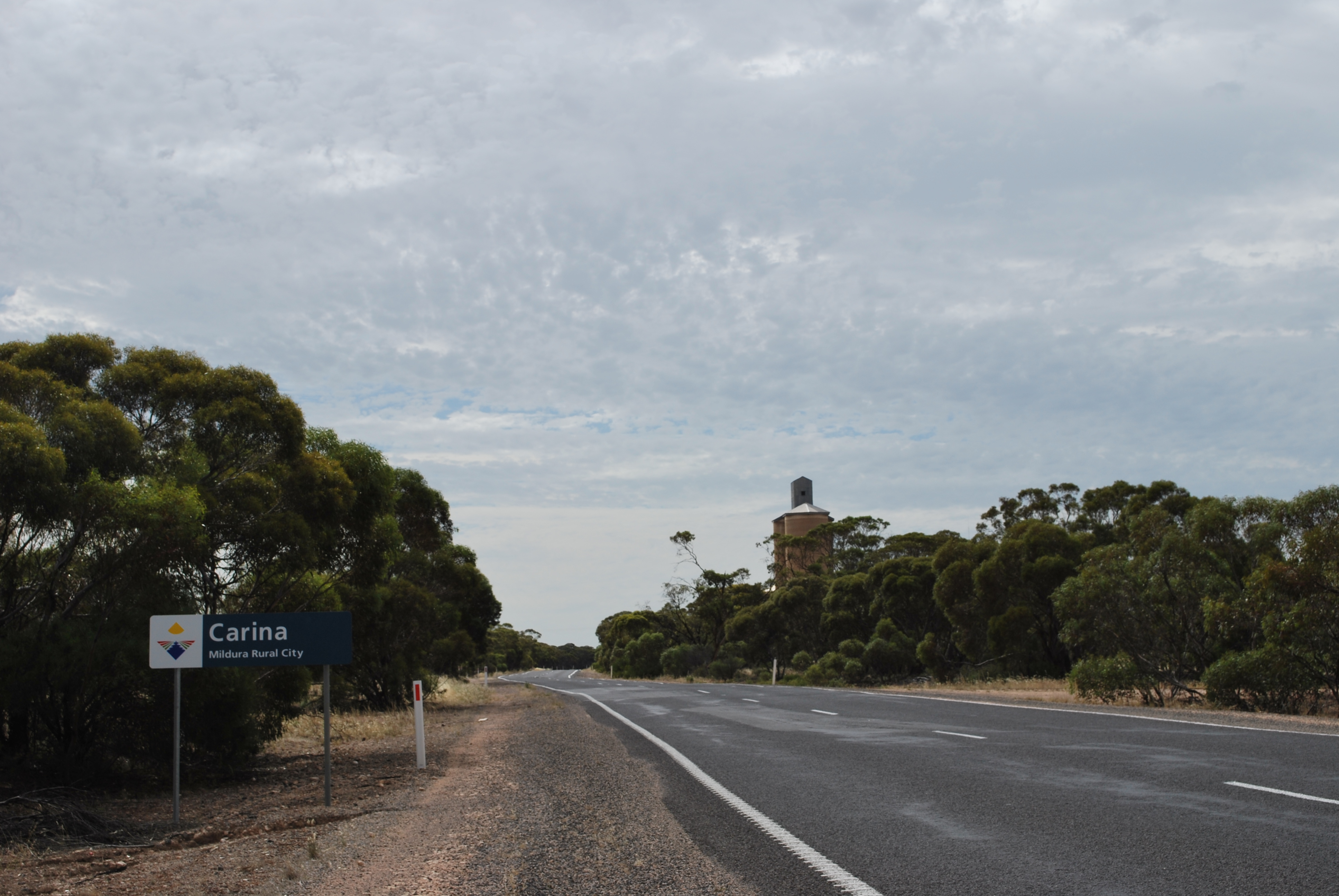
- Entering Carina

- Interactive map of Carina
- Coordinates: 35°12′51″S 141°05′42″E
- Country: Australia
- State: Victoria
- LGA: Rural City of Mildura
- Location: 550 km (340 mi) from Melbourne; 227 km (141 mi) from Mildura; 14 km (8.7 mi) from Murrayville; 10 km (6.2 mi) from Panitya

Government
  - State electorate: Mildura
  - Federal division: Mallee
- Elevation: 92 m (302 ft)

Population
  - Total: 26 (SAL 2021)
- Postcode: 3512
Localities around Carina
Panitya	Murray-Sunset	Murray-Sunset
Panitya	Carina	Murrayville
Big Desert	Big Desert	Big Desert

Carina is a locality in the Rural City of Mildura in Victoria, Australia. It is situated in the Sunraysia region on the Mallee Highway and Pinnaroo railway line. It is situated about ten kilometres east from Panitya and 14 kilometres west from Murrayville.

Carina Post Office opened on 17 June 1923 and closed in 1949.

The area of the locality contains a number of smaller areas such as Mulcra which had a post office open from 1910 until 1968 and Boltons Bore.

Carina West is home to the Select Harvests almond processing plant commissioned in 2008.
