= Murray-sunset =

Murray-sunset Victoria
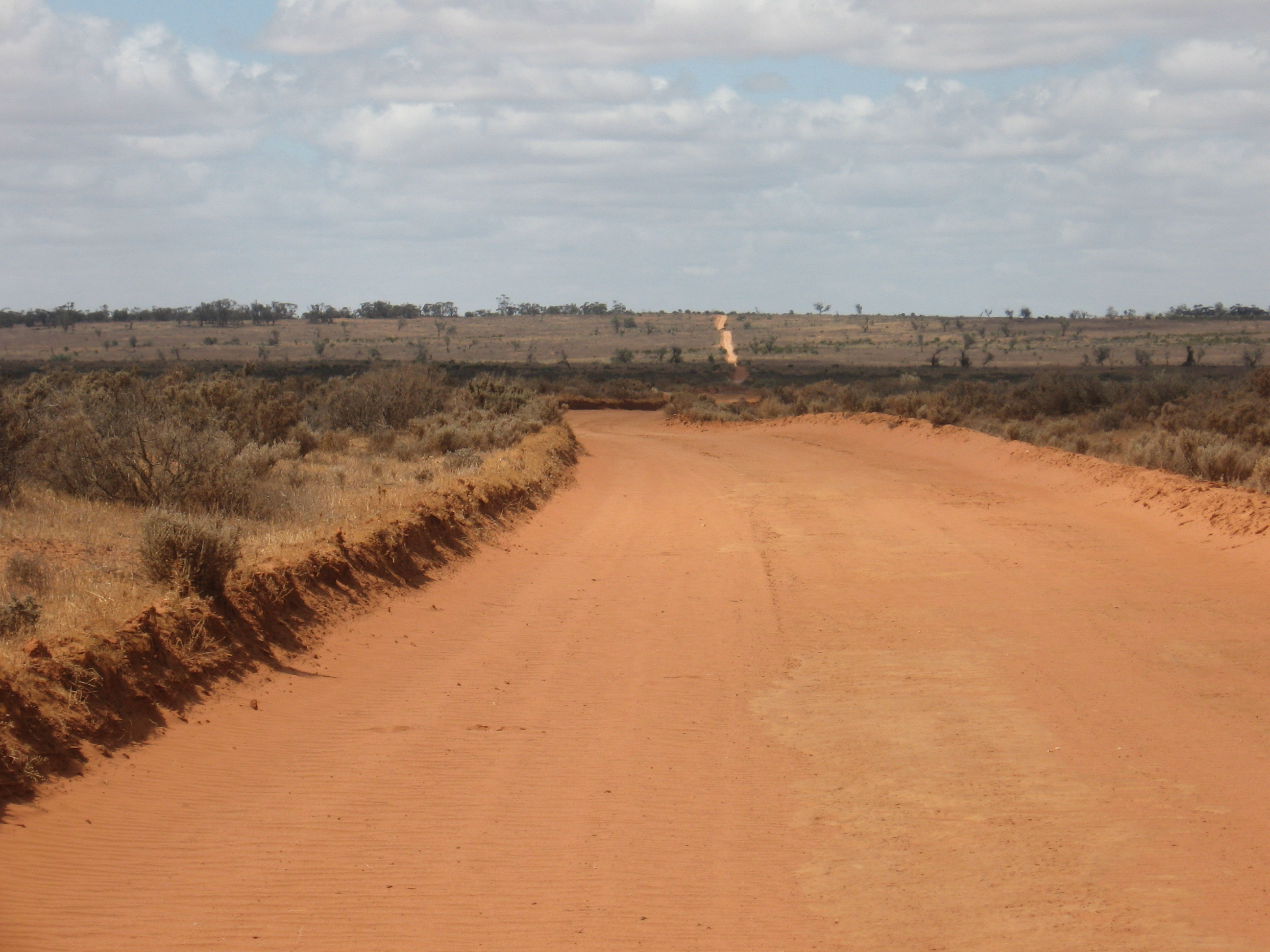
- Dirt Track in Murray-sunset

- Coordinates: 34°46′35″S 141°29′04″E
- Population: 8 (2021 census)
- Postcode(s): 3490
- LGA(s): Rural City of Mildura
- State electorate(s): Mildura
- Federal division(s): Mallee
Localities around Murray-sunset:
| Lindsay Point, Neds Corner | Meringur, Werrimull | Merrinee, Carwarp |
| South Australia | Murray-sunset | Hattah, Ouyen |
| Panitya, Carina, Murrayville | Cowangie, Tutye, Boinka, Linga | Underbool, Torrita, Walpeup |
- Footnotes: Adjoining localities

Murray-sunset is a locality in the Australian state of Victoria in the west of the state adjoining the border with South Australia. The principal land use is conservation with most of the locality being occupied by the Murray-Sunset National Park. At the 2021 census, Murray-sunset had a population of 8.
