= Speed railway station =

Former railway station in Victoria, Australia

Coordinates: 35°24′06″S 142°26′14″E

Speed
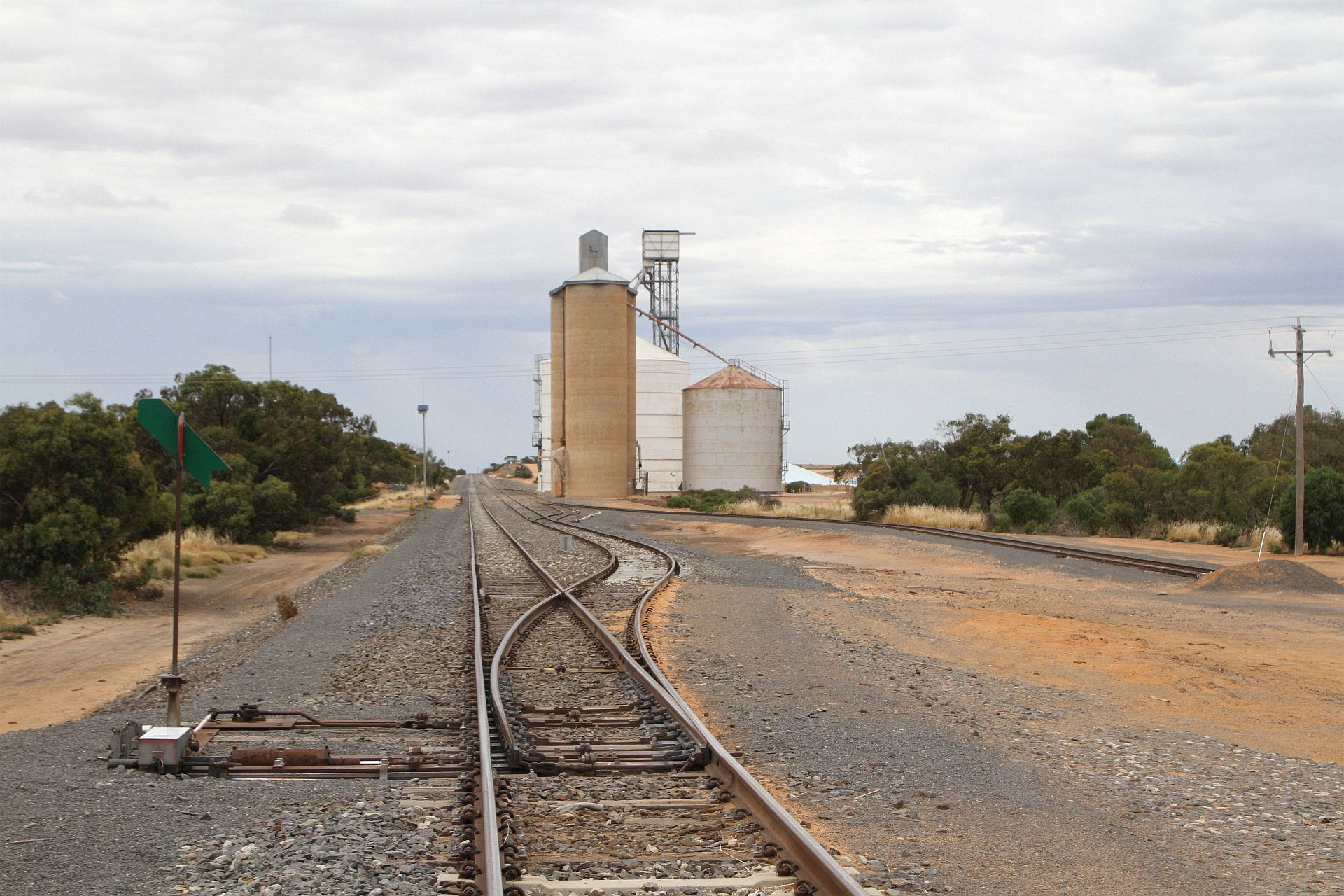
- Looking in the Melbourne direction towards crossing loop, siding and grain silos

General information
- Line: Mildura
- Platforms: 1
- Tracks: 2

Other information
- Status: Closed

History
- Opened: 1903
- Closed: 12 September 1993

Services
Preceding station	Disused railways	Following station
Woomelang	Mildura line	Ouyen
	List of closed railway stations in Victoria	
Location

Speed was a railway station in the town of Speed, Victoria, which opened in 1903 and closed in 1993.

As of 2024, there is no longer a station building, however the platform remains in relatively good condition. The station also contains a siding and grain silos.
