= Panitya =

- Town
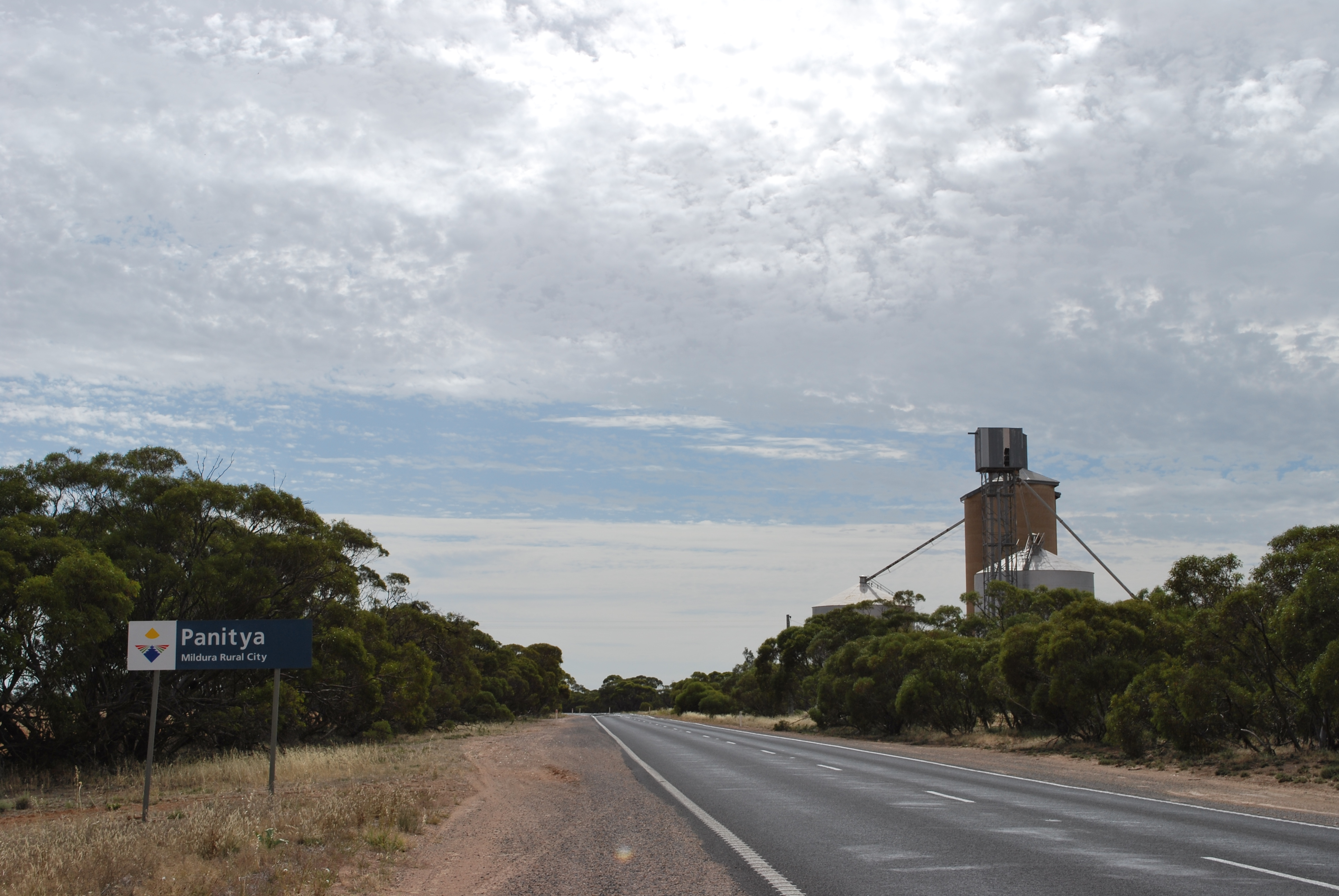
- Entering Panitya

- Coordinates: 35°14′10″S 140°59′30″E
- Country: Australia
- State: Victoria
- LGA: Rural City of Mildura
- Location: 560 km (350 mi) from Melbourne; 238 km (148 mi) from Mildura; 23 km (14 mi) from Pinnaroo; 10 km (6.2 mi) from Carina

Government
  - State electorate: Mildura
  - Federal division: Mallee
- Elevation: 91 m (299 ft)

Population
  - Total: 65 (2016 census)
- Postcode: 3512
Localities around Panitya
South Australia	Murray-Sunset	Murray-Sunset
South Australia	Panitya	Carina
South Australia	Big Desert	Big Desert

Panitya is a locality situated in the Sunraysia region of Victoria, Australia. The place by road, is situated about 23 kilometres east from Pinnaroo and 10 kilometres west from Carina on the Mallee Highway.

Panitya is a railway station on the Ouyen to Pinnaroo line.

The Post Office opened in 1910 and was closed in 1975.

The area of the locality contains a number of smaller areas, namely Panitya East which had a post office open from 1916 until 1933, Berrook which had a post office open from 1929 until 1935, Manya with a post office from 1928 until 1936, Sunset with a post office from 1921 until 1948 and, below the Mallee Highway, Ngallo.
