= Select Harvests =

Australian almond production company

- Formerly: Defender Limited
- Type: public (ASX: SHV)
- Industry: Agribusiness
- Founded: 1978 in Australia
- Headquarters: Melbourne, Australia
- Key people: Mr Travis Dillon, Chairman; Kristina Hermanson, MD (CEO); Liam Nolan, CFO
- Products: Almonds, Health food, Inshell almonds, Almond kernels, Value-add almond products
- Production output: ▲24,903 tonnes (2025); 14,500 tonnes (2015)
- Brands: Allinga Farms
- Revenue: (2025)
- Operating income: ▲ A$82.4 million (2025)
- Net income: ▲ A$31.8 million (2025)
- Total assets: ▲ A$552.85 million (2019)
- Total equity: ▲ A$416 million (2019)
- Number of employees: 270 permanent, 500 seasonal (2015)
- Website: www.selectharvests.com.au

Select Harvests is Australia's largest almond grower and processor, and is the third largest grower worldwide. It manages almond orchards in Victoria, New South Wales and South Australia. The company, based in Melbourne, employs around 270 permanently, which peaks up to 500 people seasonally (2015).

The business is divided into two divisions: an almond business which owns and manages orchards, including the harvest and initial processing of the crop, and a food business, which processes and markets a range of inshell almonds, almond kernels and value-add almond products. Select Harvests markets almonds and almond products globally through the brand Allinga Farms.

In 2021, Select Harvests sold the Lucky and Sunsol brands to Prolife Foods of New Zealand, however, the company has retained the Allinga Farms and Renshaw brands.

== History ==
Select Harvests was founded in 1978, its listed predecessors have existed since 1983. The company was formerly known as Defender Limited and Defender Australia Limited.

Early Australian almond plantations were first made on the Adelaide Plains in the 19th century. This area was well suited to almond production by virtue of its climate, rainfall, and fertile soils. From here almond plantations spread to southern Adelaide (notably Willunga, South Australia). These areas, however, have been mostly built over following urban expansion.

In the 1960s and 1970s the majority of the industry moved from the Willunga area further east, to along the Murray River with the major growing regions being the Riverland, Sunraysia and Riverina districts. These areas were favourable due to cheaper land, water availability for irrigation, and better suited climate for almond growing. This is where Select Harvests primarily now operates its orchards.

Total Australian almond acreage increased five-fold over the eight years between 1999 and 2007, from approximately 9,000 planted acres in 1999 to 62,000 acres in 2007; of which Select Harvests owns approximately 9,000 acres and leases an additional 4,500 acres.

In 2025, Select Harvests total planted area stood at 22,403 acres across three growing regions.

== Orchards ==
The company orchards are based in Robinvale (Northern Victoria), the Riverina, Hillston, and near Griffith in New South Wales, Paringa, South Australia and Loxton, South Australia. In 2014 the company purchased the Amaroo property in Renmark South Australia, which at the time was the largest independent almond orchard in Australia.

In 2008, Select Harvests secured 4,300 acres on the Dandaragan Plateau in Western Australia. In early 2013, Select Harvests decided to exit the Dandaragan Almond project, placing its immature orchards, water rights and associated irrigation infrastructure on market for sale. In December 2015, Select Harvests announced that it would sell its WA orchards and land to an unnamed private Australian business for A$9.5 million after almost A$60 million of write-downs.

Select Harvests is one of Australia's largest almond exporters and has continued to expand in the fast-growing markets of India and China, as well as established routes to markets in Asia, Europe and the Middle East.

== Processing ==
Select Harvests has a state-of-the-art almond processing facility in Wemen Victoria, Australia. Located on the Murray River 400kms northwest of Melbourne.

Carina West

The Carina West processing facility occupies 100 acres and has a hulling and shelling capacity of 50,000mt (12 months). The Carina West plant was commissioned in 2008 at a cost of A$40 million, it also has significant storage, sorting, packing, warehousing and fumigation facilities. Select Harvests produces almond products according to Australian Quarantine and Inspection Service, hazard analysis and critical control points, Global Food Safety Initiative (SQF2000), halal and kosher certifications.

In 2015, Select Harvests was awarded a A$1.5 million grant towards the construction of a biomass electricity co-generation plant and almond production line at its processing plant in Carina West.

The project consists of a biomass boiler and steam turbine plant, fuelled by almond and orchard waste products, and converted to heat and power, with excess fed into the electricity grid. Initial estimates indicated that it would consume 30,000 metric tonnes of almond and orchard waste and reduce annual carbon dioxide emissions for the company by more than 23,500 tonnes.

The company sustainability report of 2023 stated that 27,685 tonnes of biomass were fed into the co-generation plant, generating 17.8 GWh of renewable electricity, some of which was then fed back onto the electricity grid.
