= Underbool =

- Town
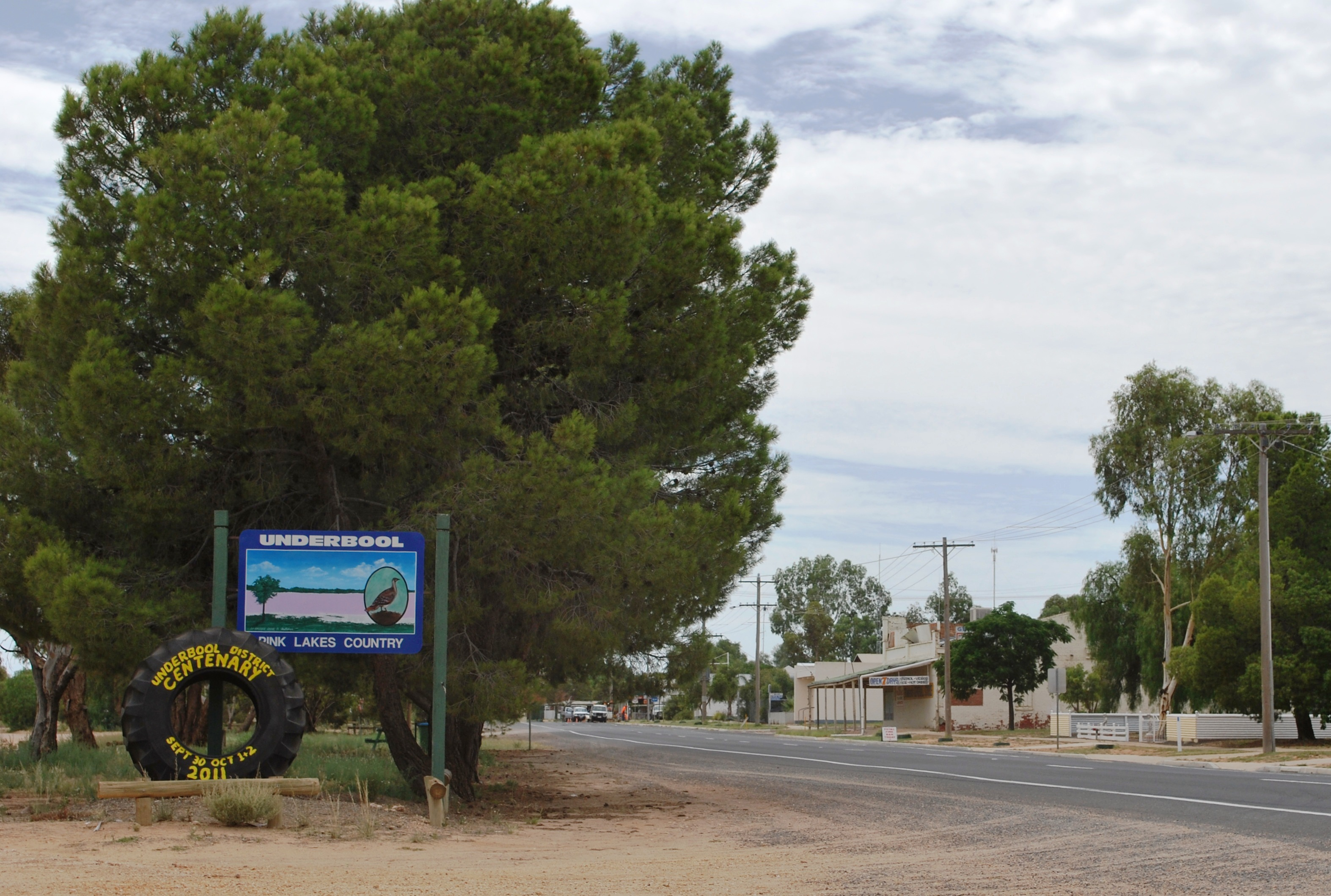
- Mallee Highway at Underbool

- Coordinates: 35°10′0″S 141°49′0″E
- Country: Australia
- State: Victoria
- LGA: Rural City of Mildura
- Location: 476 km (296 mi) from Melbourne; 154 km (96 mi) from Mildura

Government
  - State electorate: Mildura
  - Federal division: Mallee
- Elevation: 91 m (299 ft)

Population
  - Total: 216 (2016 census)
- Postcode: 3509
Localities around Underbool
Murray-Sunset	Murray-Sunset	Torrita
Linga	Underbool	Torrita
Big Desert	Big Desert	Big Desert

Underbool is a town in the Mallee region of north-west Victoria, Australia. The town is in the Rural City of Mildura local government area and on the Mallee Highway—between Ouyen and the South Australian border – 476 kilometres (296 mi) north west of the state capital, Melbourne. The town services the grain farmers and graziers in the area. For tourists it provides access to the Pink Lakes in Murray-Sunset National Park.

The town's name is thought to derive from the German word underbolt, given to it by surveyor Dr. Neumayer when he camped there in October 1861.

A post office opened on 15 July 1912 when a regular mail service was provided by the opening of the railway from Ouyen to Murrayville a month earlier.

Underbool Primary School (No. 3819) opened on 5 November 1913, with a purpose-built school building opening in June 1919. A second weatherboard building was built in 1929, and the former Daalko school building moved there in 1967.

With its neighbouring township Walpeup Underbool had a football team (Walpeup-Underbool) in the Mallee Football League until the league folded in 2015. The team merged with Ouyen and play two matches a season in Underbool in the Sunraysia Football League. Golfers play at the course of the Underbool Golf Club on Monash Avenue.
