= Patchewollock =

- Town
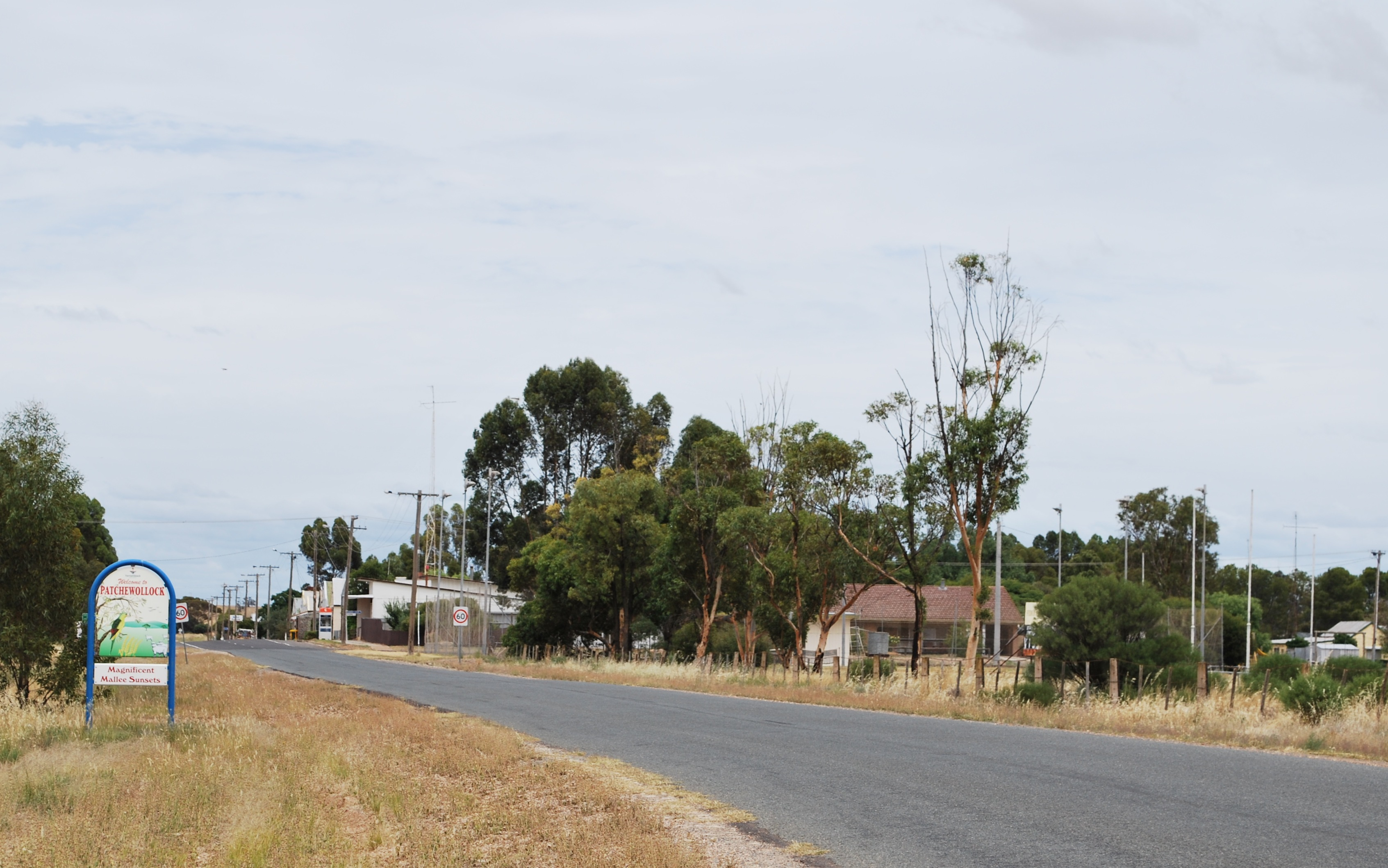
- Entering Patchewollock

- Coordinates: 35°22′58″S 142°11′24″E
- Country: Australia
- State: Victoria
- LGAs: Shire of Yarriambiack; Rural City of Mildura
- Location: 429 km (267 mi) NW of Melbourne; 149 km (93 mi) S of Mildura; 47 km (29 mi) S of Ouyen

Government
  - State electorate: Mildura
  - Federal division: Mallee

Population
  - Total: 149 (2016 census)
- Postcode: 3491
Localities around Patchewollock
Torrita	Walpeup, Ouyen	Tempy
Big Desert	Patchewollock	Speed, Turriff
Yaapeet	Hopetoun	Lascelles

Patchewollock is a town in north-west Victoria, Australia. At the 2021 census, Patchewollock had a population of 149.

The name Patchewollock originated from two Aboriginal words: putje, plenty, and wallah, porcupine grass. The town was first established after the First World War, when soldier settlement blocks were appearing in the area. A post office (originally a receiving office) opened on 27 July 1920.

Previous localities of Baring 35°24′S 142°04′E with a post office open from 1926 to 1948, and Dering 35°22′S 142°19′E with a post office open from 1923 to 1949, lie within that part of the Patchewollock locality in the Rural City of Mildura.

As of 2011, the township maintained a pub and a post office.

== History ==
Patchewollock is a rural township located within the traditional lands of the Wergaia tribes, whose Aboriginal expression literally means the "place of the plenty porcupine grass". By the end of World War I, the town was founded as a soldier settlement.

The town's most notable feature is a giant mural silo portrait, which depicts the life of grazier and grain farmer, Nick "Noodle" Hulland, painted in 2016 by street artist Fintan Magee.
