= Dandaragan, Western Australia =

Town in Wheatbelt region of Western Australia

Dandaragan
- Town
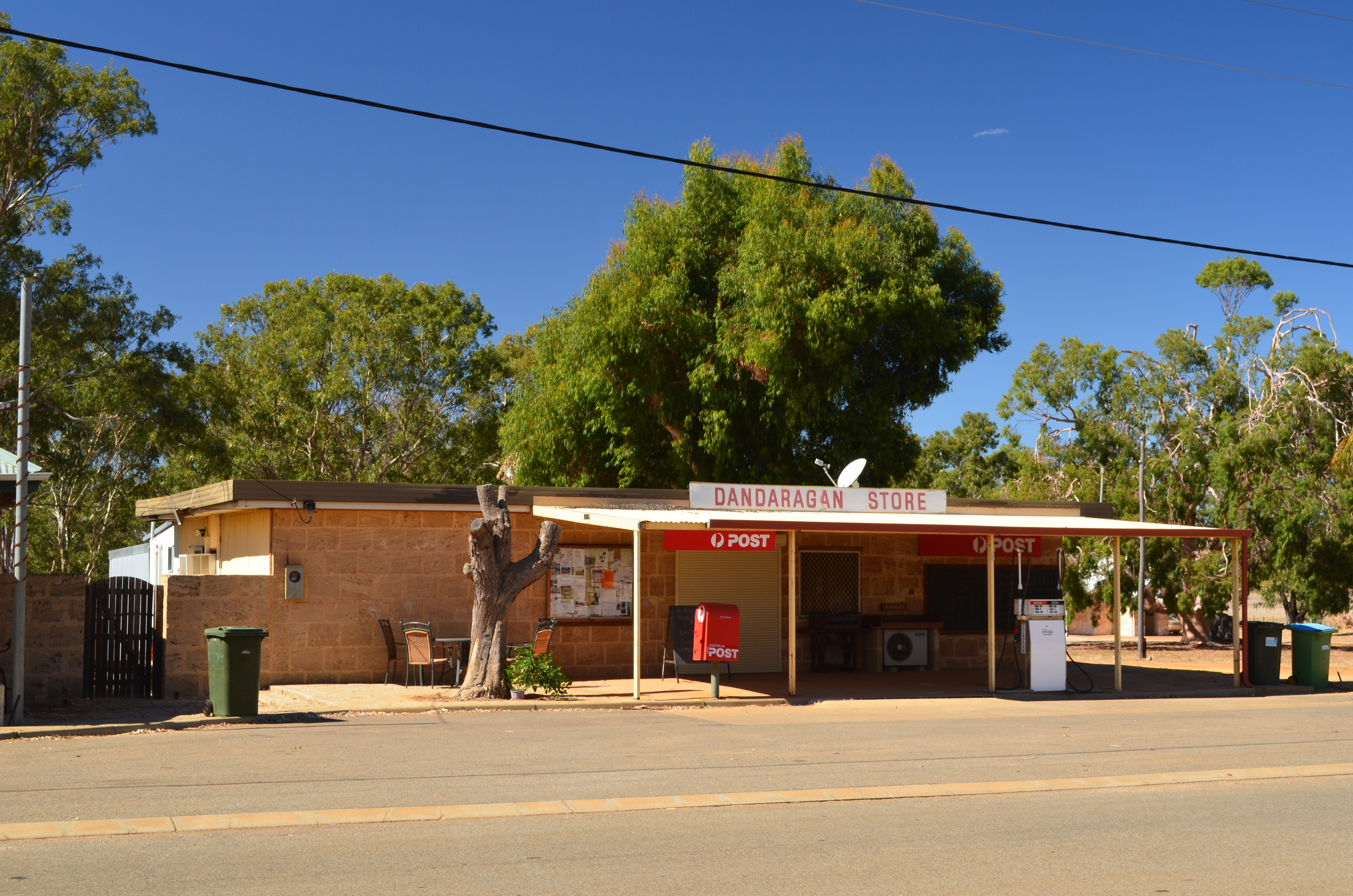
- Dandaragan Store, 2014.

- Coordinates: 30°41′S 115°42′E
- Country: Australia
- State: Western Australia
- LGA(s): Shire of Dandaragan
- Location: 170 km (110 mi) north of Perth; 29 km (18 mi) west of Moora; 98 km (61 mi) south east of Jurien Bay
- Established: 1850 gazetted 1958

Government
  - State electorate(s): Moore
  - Federal division(s): Durack

Area
  - Total: 974.4 km^{2} (376.2 sq mi)
- Elevation: 193 m (633 ft)

Population
  - Total(s): 292 (SAL 2021)
- Postcode: 6507

Dandaragan is a small town in the Wheatbelt region of Western Australia. The Dandaragan plateau is the underlying geological feature of the area.

== History ==
The first recorded land lease was to William Brockman in 1848; he had a 2,428-hectare (6,000-acre) land lease at Muchamulla Springs.

The name of Dandaragan was first recorded in 1850 as the name of a nearby gulley and spring or watering hole known as Dandaraga spring. The word is Indigenous Australian in origin and is thought to mean good kangaroo country. James Drummond settled in the area in 1850 and established a farm. A police station was built later and the townsite was gazetted in 1958.

Select Harvests unsuccessfully attempted to grow a large almond orchard near Dandaragan between 2010 and 2015.
