= Cowangie =

- Town
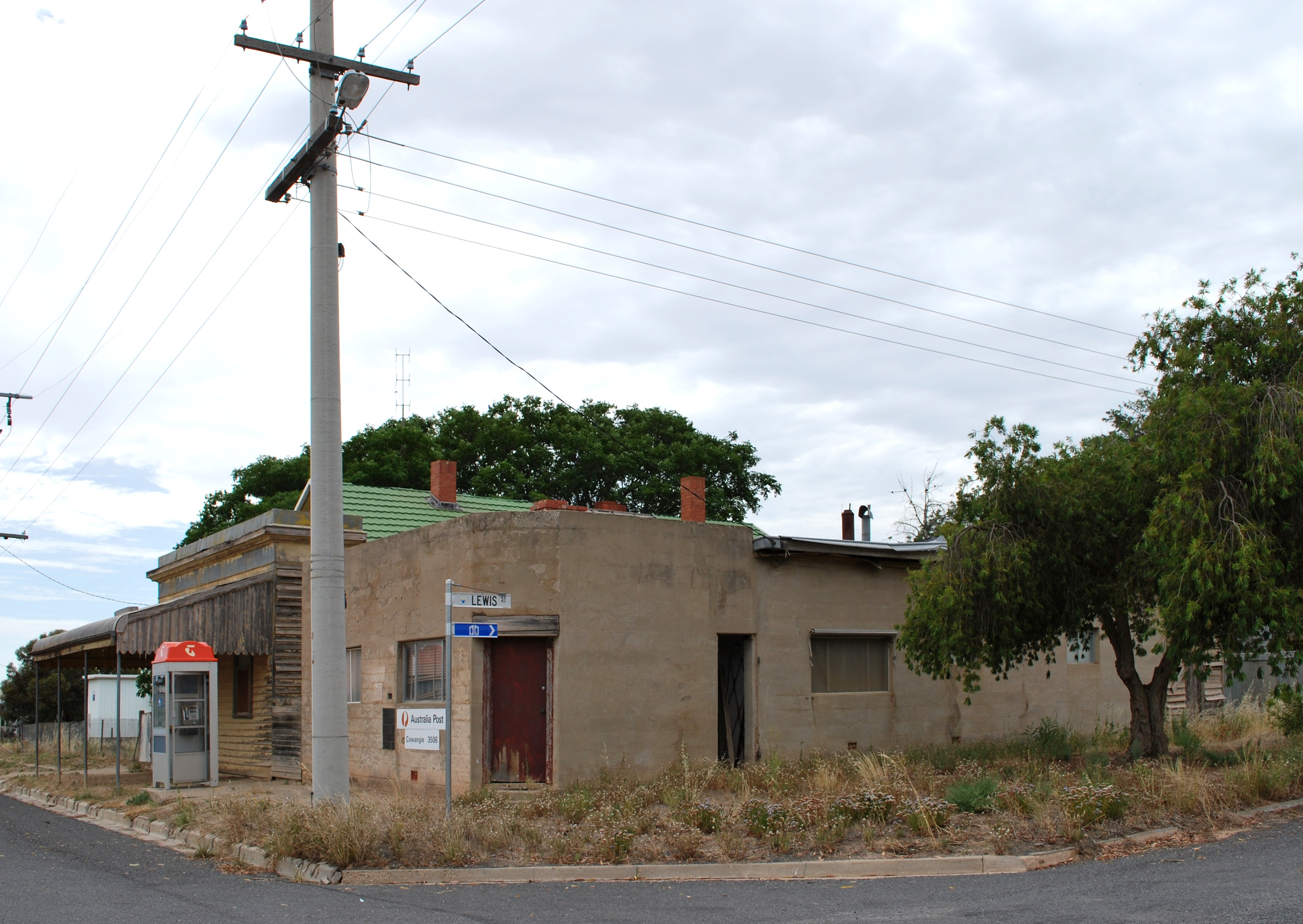
- The post office at Cowangie, now closed

- Coordinates: 35°13′19″S 141°23′45″E
- Country: Australia
- State: Victoria
- LGA: Rural City of Mildura
- Location: 510 km (320 mi) from Melbourne; 187 km (116 mi) from Mildura; 12 km (7.5 mi) from Danyo; 12 km (7.5 mi) from Tutye

Government
  - State electorate: Mildura
  - Federal division: Mallee
- Elevation: 94 m (308 ft)

Population
  - Total: 33 (2021 census)
- Postcode: 3506
Localities around Cowangie
Murray-Sunset	Murray-Sunset	Murray-Sunset
Murrayville	Cowangie	Tutye
Big Desert	Big Desert	Big Desert

Cowangie /kaʊˈændʒi/ is a locality situated on the section of the Mallee Highway between Ouyen and the South Australian border in the Sunraysia region of Victoria, Australia. The place by road, is situated about 12 kilometres southeast from Tutye and 12 kilometres northwest from Danyo.

The Post Office opened on 15 July 1912 when a regular mail service was provided by the opening of the railway from Ouyen to Murrayville a month earlier. Known as Kow Plains until 1913, the office closed in 1994.

The area of the locality contains a number of smaller areas namely Pallarang which had a post office open from 1915 until 1917, Daalko with an office open from 1928 until 1930, Bunurouk, Bunurouk West with an office in 1915 and 1916, Cowangie North and Koonda.

Former Formula One and V8 Supercar driver Larry Perkins grew up in Cowangie.

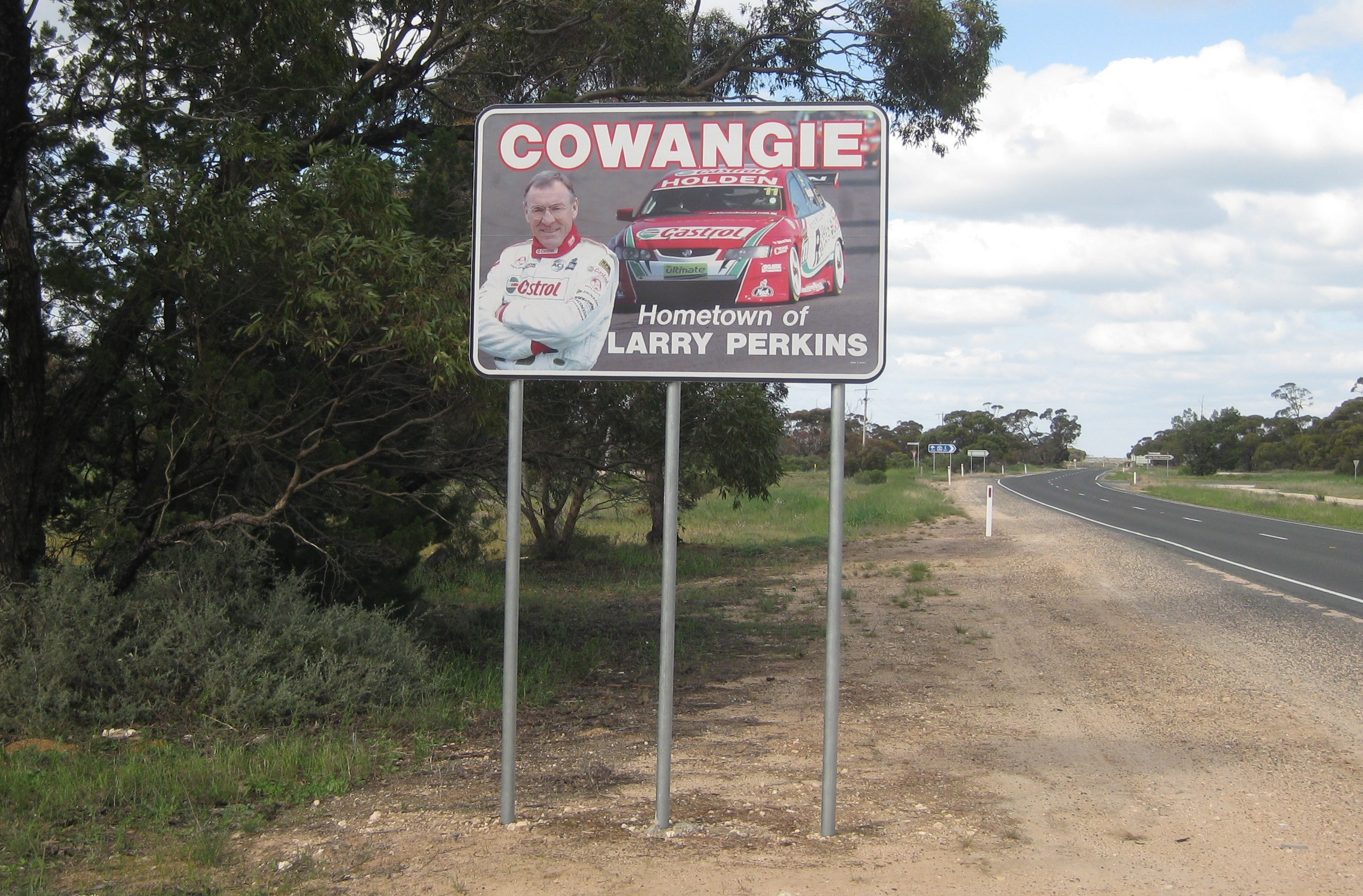
Sign proclaiming Cowangie to be the "Hometown of Larry Perkins"
