= Sunset Country =

Desert in Victoria, Australia

Coordinates: 34°51′S 141°38′E

Sunset Country, or the Sunset Desert, is a desert situated in remote north-west Victoria in the Sunraysia region. By road, the area is about 4 kilometres north from Manya and 30 kilometres south from Berrook.

Sunset Country is near the south-west corner of the Murray-Sunset National Park.
