= Mallee Highway =

Highway in South Australia and Victoria

Mallee Highway South Australia–Victoria
- Coordinates: 35.286901°S 139.485392°E (West end); 35.030403°S 143.334836°E (East end)

General information
- Type: Highway
- Length: 374.4 km (233 mi)
- Gazetted: December 1914 (as Main Road); 1947/48 (as State Highway)
- Route number(s): B12 (1997/1998–present)
- Former route number: National Route 12 (1955–1997/1998)

Major junctions
- West end: Dukes Highway; Tailem Bend, South Australia
- Ngarkat Highway; Browns Well Highway; Calder Highway; Murray Valley Highway
- East end: Tooleybuc Road; VIC/NSW border

Location(s)
- Region: Murray and Mallee, Loddon Mallee
- Major settlements: Lameroo, Pinnaroo, Murrayville, Walpeup, Ouyen, Manangatang

Highway system
- Highways in Australia; National Highway • Freeways in Australia; Highways in South Australia; Highways in Victoria

Mallee Highway is a highway connecting Tailem Bend in south-eastern South Australia and Piangil in north-western Victoria, running mostly across the Mallee plains. It forms part of the shortest route between Adelaide and Sydney.

== Route ==
Mallee Highway commences at the intersection with Dukes Highway just south-east of Tailem Bend in South Australia and runs east as a dual-lane, single-carriageway road, through cereal-growing farmland at the southern end of the Murray Mallee to Pinnaroo near the border with Victoria, where it crosses the Ngarkat and Browns Well Highways. It continues east into Victoria through Murrayville and Walpeup until it reaches Ouyen, where it meets Calder Highway, then continues east through Manangatang to Piangil, where it meets with Murray Valley Highway, then along Tooleybuc Road two kilometres to the north where it continues east until it eventually terminates at the New South Wales border and the Murray River at Tooleybuc, where the highway officially ends.

=== Yanga Way ===
Beyond the New South Wales border, the road continues to Balranald, where it meets the Sturt Highway. This stretch of road is named the Balranald-Tooleybuc Road, and also known as the Yanga Way. However, it does not formally form part of the Mallee Highway and has not been assigned a route number.

== History ==
Within Victoria, the passing of the Country Roads Act 1912 through the Parliament of Victoria provided for the establishment of the Country Roads Board (later VicRoads) and their ability to declare Main Roads, taking responsibility for the management, construction and care of the state's major roads from local municipalities. Ouyen-Pinnaroo Road was declared a Main Road from Ouyen via Walpeup and Murrayville to the state border with South Australia on 14 December 1914, and Tooleybuc Road was declared a Main Road from Swan Hill-Euston Road (today Murray Valley Highway) in Piangil to the state border with New South Wales (the Tooleybuc punt on the Murray River) on 23 August 1917.

The passing of the Developmental Roads Act 1918 allowed the Country Road Board to declare Developmental Roads, serving to develop any area of land by providing access to a railway station for primary producers. Ouyen-(Kulwin-)Manangatang Road was declared a Developmental Road, between Ouyen and Kulwin on 8 April 1920, and between Kulwin and Manangatang on 18 November 1920

The passing of the Highways and Vehicles Act 1924 provided for the declaration of State Highways, roads two-thirds financed by the State government through the Country Roads Board. Ouyen Highway was declared a State Highway within Victoria in the 1947/48 financial year, from Calder Highway at Ouyen via Murrayville and Walpeup to the border (for a total of 81 miles), subsuming the original declaration of Ouyen-Pinnaroo Road as a Main Road.

With the passing of the Transport Act 1983, the highway was renamed as Mallee Highway, and extended east along the former Ouyen–Piangil Road to Piangil in December 1990, subsuming the original declarations of Tooleybuc Road as a Main Road and Ouyen-Manangatang Road as a Developmental Road.

The highway was signed as National Route 12 between Tailem Bend and Ouyen in 1955, later extended with the road to Piangil in 1990. With both states' conversion to their newer alphanumeric systems in the late 1990s, its former route number was updated to B12 in 1997 (within Victoria), and in 1998 (in South Australia).

The passing of the Road Management Act 2004 granted the responsibility of overall management and development of Victoria's major arterial roads to VicRoads: in 2004, VicRoads re-declared the road as Mallee Highway (Arterial #6650), beginning at the South Australian border at Panitya and ending at the New South Wales border in Piangil.

== Major intersections and towns ==
State	LGA	Location	km	mi	Destinations	Notes
South Australia	The Coorong	Tailem Bend	0.0	0.0	Dukes Highway (A8) – Adelaide, Keith, Bordertown, Melbourne	Western terminus of highway and route B12
South Australia	The Coorong	Moorlands	14.5	9.0	Old Dukes Highway – Coomandook	
South Australia	The Coorong	Sherlock	29.7	18.5	Kulkawurra Road (north) – Karoonda; Tynan Road (south) – Yumali	
South Australia	Southern Mallee	Lameroo	98.5	61.2	Billiat Road – Alawoona	Roundabout
South Australia	Southern Mallee	Pinnaroo	132.7	82.5	Ngarkat Highway (B57 south) – Bordertown, Naracoorte	Concurrency with route B57
South Australia	Southern Mallee	Pinnaroo	139.3	86.6	Browns Well Highway (B57 north) – Loxton, Renmark	Concurrency with route B57
State border			145.0	90.1	South Australia – Victoria state border	
Victoria	Mildura	Panitya	148.4	92.2	Panitya Road – Panitya	
Victoria	Mildura	Murrayville	166.4	103.4	Murrayville–Nhill Road – Nhill	
Victoria	Mildura	Boinka	205.9	127.9	Boinka South Road – Tutye	
Victoria	Mildura	Underbool	226.3	140.6	Underbool–Patchewollock Road – Patchewollock	
Victoria	Mildura	Walpeup	246.1	152.9	Walpeup–Patchewollock Road (C247) – Patchewollock, Hopetoun	
Victoria	Mildura	Ouyen	273.0	169.6	Ouyen–Patchewollock Road – Patchewollock, Hopetoun	
Victoria	Mildura	Ouyen	275.3	171.1	Calder Highway (A79 south) – Ballarat, Bendigo, Melbourne	Concurrency with route A79
Victoria	Mildura	Ouyen	275.5	171.2	Calder Highway (A79 north) – Red Cliffs, Mildura	Concurrency with route A79
Victoria	Swan Hill	Manangatang	330.0	205.1	Robinvale–Sea Lake Road (C251) – Robinvale, Sea Lake	
Victoria	Swan Hill	Piangil	371.1	230.6	Murray Valley Highway (B400 south) – Swan Hill, Melbourne	Concurrency with route B12
Victoria	Swan Hill	Piangil	373.0	231.8	Murray Valley Highway (B400 north) – Robinvale	Concurrency with route B12
Victoria	Swan Hill	Piangil	374.4	232.6	Tooleybuc Road – Tooleybuc, Balranald	Eastern terminus of highway and route B12; road continues as Yanga Way to Balranald
State border			374.4	232.6	Victoria – New South Wales state border	
New South Wales	Murray River		374.4	232.6	Tooleybuc Bridge	
1.000 mi = 1.609 km; 1.000 km = 0.621 mi: Concurrency terminus; Route transition

== See also ==
- Highways in Australia
- Highways in Victoria
- List of highways in New South Wales
- List of highways in South Australia
