= Rural City of Mildura =

- Local government area
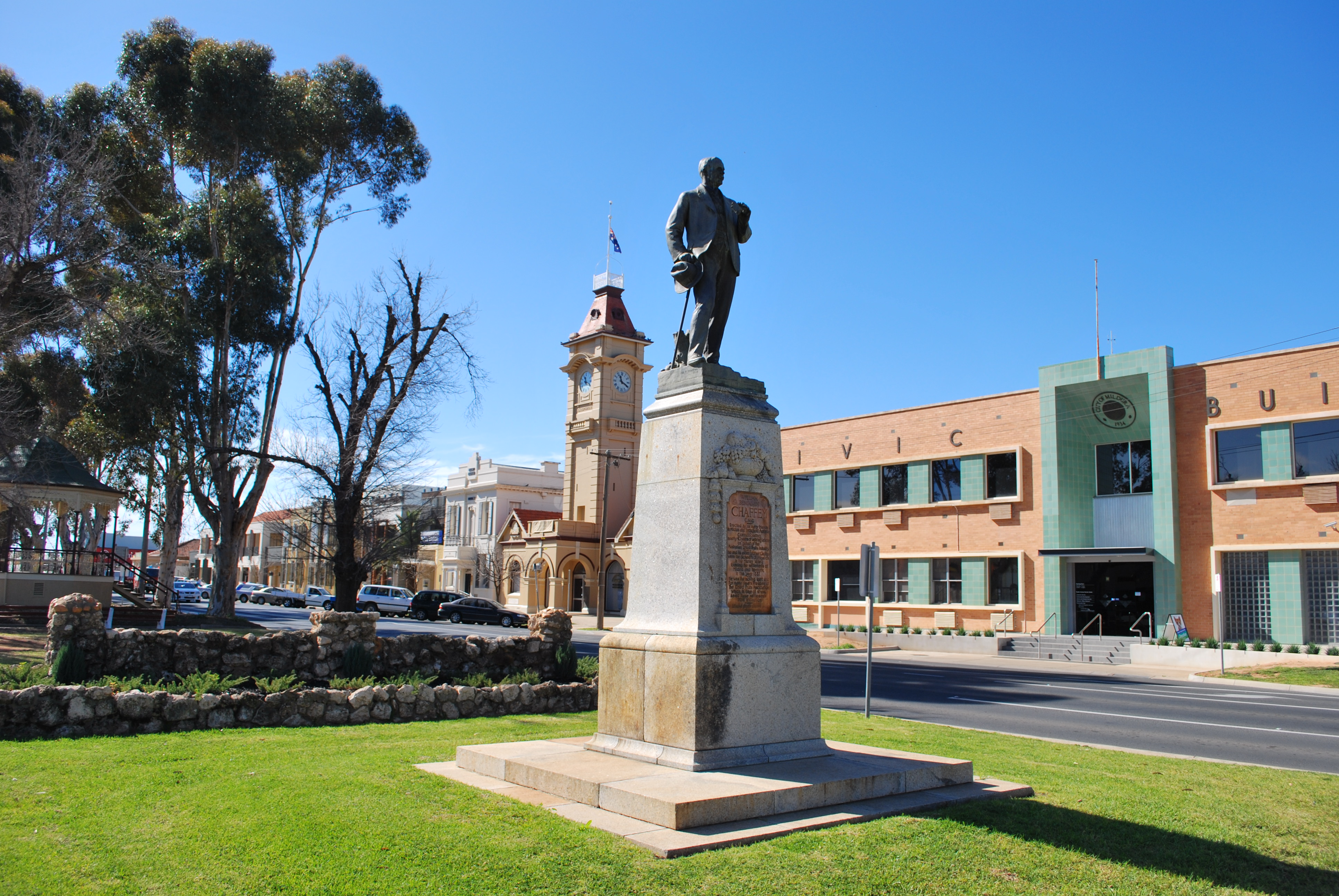
- Location in Victoria Civic Buildings, 2009

- Interactive map of Rural City of Mildura
- Coordinates: 34°47′50″S 141°45′40″E
- Country: Australia
- State: Victoria
- Region: Loddon Mallee
- Established: 1995
- Council seat: Mildura

Government
  - Mayor: Cr Helen Healy
  - State electorate: Mildura
  - Federal division: Mallee

Area
  - Total: 22,083 km^{2} (8,526 sq mi)

Population
  - Total: 56,972 (2021 census)
  - Density: 2.57990/km^{2} (6.68192/sq mi)
- Gazetted: 20 January 1995
- Website: Rural City of Mildura
LGAs around Rural City of Mildura
Renmark Paringa (SA)	Wentworth (NSW)	Wentworth (NSW)
Loxton Waikerie (SA)	Rural City of Mildura	Swan Hill
West Wimmera; Southern Mallee (SA)	Hindmarsh; Yarriambiack	Buloke

The Rural City of Mildura is a local government area in Victoria, Australia, located in the north-western part of the state. It covers an area of 22,083 square kilometres (8,526 mi^{2}) being the largest LGA in the state by land size. In August 2021 the area had a population of 56,972. It includes the city of Mildura and the towns of Merbein, Red Cliffs, Irymple, Ouyen, Murrayville and Underbool.

The Rural City is governed and administered by the Mildura Rural City Council; its seat of local government and administrative centre is located at the council headquarters in Mildura, it also has service centres located in Ouyen and a couple of other locations within Mildura. The Rural City is named after the main urban settlement, Mildura, which is also the LGA's most populous urban centre with a population of 30,647.

In 2006 the Rural City of Mildura had a population of 49,815, most of which was located in Mildura (30,016) and adjacent areas (that is Victorian Sunraysia). Many of the small towns in the region have practically disappeared as more efficient farming methods reduce the quantity of human labour required.

== History ==
The Rural City of Mildura was formed in 1995 from the amalgamation of the City of Mildura, Shire of Mildura and Shire of Walpeup.

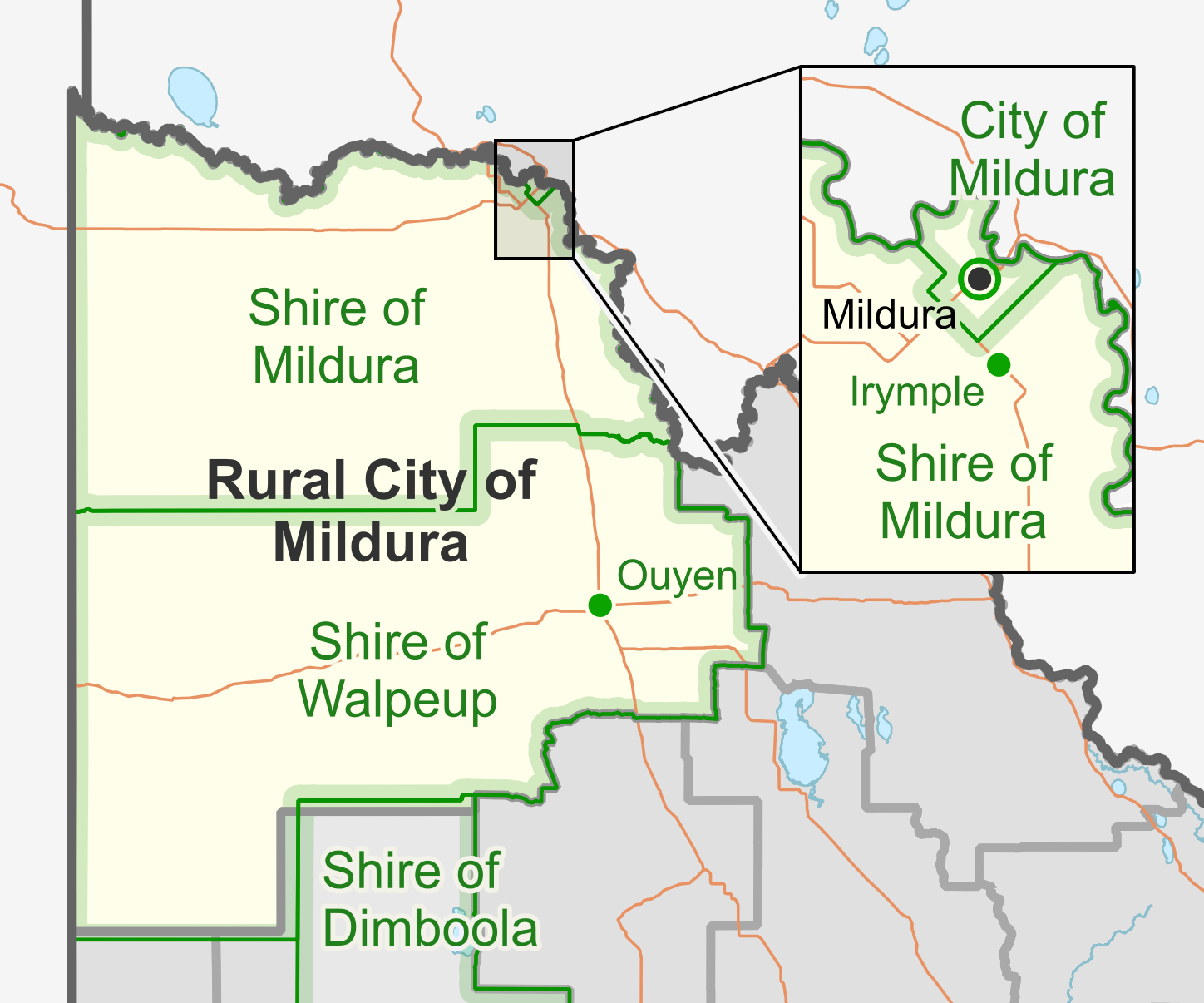
The Rural City's predecessor LGAs (green) as they were in 1994. The administrative centres of the former LGAs are marked by green dots.

== Geography ==
The Rural City of Mildura covers most of the Mallee region of Victoria. Before the less infertile soils were fertilised and developed for the production of wheat and barley the whole region was covered in a dense mallee scrub of deep-rooting eucalypts that regenerated after the frequent bushfires in the region. Many of the soils are so sandy that clearing is impractical, and Murray-Sunset National Park covers almost a third of the area of the LGA. Other protected areas include Hattah-Kulkyne National Park and Murray-Kulkyne Park on the Murray River.

The climate of the region is the driest in Victoria, and Neds Corner in the remote northwest has the lowest average annual rainfall in the state at 240 millimetres (9.4 in). In the south at Ouyen the average is 335 mm (13.2 in). In all the areas of the LGA there can be considerable variation in annual rainfall: the range historically has been from 110 mm (4.3 in) in 1967 to 605 mm (23.8 in) in 1973. Temperatures in the LGA are the hottest in Victoria and the average summer maximum is 32 °C (90 °F), but it often exceeds 40 °C (104 °F). Winter can be very pleasant with a maximum of 16 °C (61 °F), but frosts are common in the morning and can sometimes be severe.

The southeast of the LGA is used primarily for grain growing; however yields are erratic and often poor due to drought. In the north irrigated fruit growing (primarily oranges and grapes) is highly productive and supports Mildura and nearby towns; however, salinity in the Murray River is a major threat to the long-term sustainability of these activities, as is competition from overseas citrus growers.

== Council ==
=== Current composition ===
The council is composed of nine councillors elected to represent single member wards. Council Composition as of May 2026:

Ward	Councillor	Term	Notes
City Gate	Katie Clements	2024—Present	
Henderson Park	Helen Healy	2020—Present	Mayor
Karadoc	Rebecca Louise Crossling	2024—Present	Deputy Mayor
Kings Billabong	Glenn Milne	2008—Present	
Lake Ranfurly	Troy Bailey	2022—Present	
Mildura Wetlands	Ali Cupper	2024—Present	
Millewa	Ian Richard Arney	2020—Present	
Nowingi Place	Jodi Ewings	2020—Present	
Sunset Country	Greg Brown	2022—Present	

=== Administration and governance ===
The council meets in the council chambers at the council headquarters in the Mildura Municipal Offices, which is also the location of the council's administrative activities. It also provides customer services at both its administrative centre on Madden Avenue in Mildura, and its service centres in Ouyen and on Deakin Avenue in Mildura.

== Townships and localities ==
At the 2021 census, the rural city had a population of 56,972 up from 53,878 in the 2016 census

Population
Locality	2016	2021
Big Desert^	3	8
Birdwoodton	643	748
Boinka	13	14
Cabarita	488	482
Cardross	821	847
Carina	22	26
Carwarp	70	68
Colignan	329	305
Cowangie	36	33
Cullulleraine	69	81
Hattah	28	27
Iraak	128	118
Irymple	5,325	5,977
Koorlong	366	397
Kulwin	15	16
Lindsay Point	38	32
Linga	10	13
Merbein	2,713	2,770
Merbein South	405	407
Merbein West	190	223
Meringur	67	70
Merrinee	48	42
Mildura	32,738	34,565
Mittyack	14	12
Murray-sunset	4	8
Murrayville	280	278
Nangiloc	141	153
Neds Corner	4	3
Nichols Point	1,551	1,723
Ouyen	1,191	1,170
Panitya	65	67
Patchewollock^	133	149
Red Cliffs	5,060	5,294
Tempy^	57	62
Torrita	32	51
Tutye	20	21
Underbool	215	215
Walpeup	158	171
Wargan	71	53
Werrimull	112	97
Yelta	322	325

^ - Territory divided with another LGA

== Sister cities ==
Mildura has sister city relations with the following cities:

- Dali, Yunnan Province of China (established 2006)
- Kumatori, Japan (established 2001)
- Upland, California, United States of America (established 1969)

== See also ==
- List of localities (Victoria)
- List of places of worship in the Rural City of Mildura
- List of places on the Victorian Heritage Register in the Rural City of Mildura
