= Pinnaroo railway line, Victoria =

Former railway line in Victoria, Australia

Pinnaroo railway line (Victoria)

Overview
- Status: Open from Ouyen to Murrayville
- Termini: Ouyen; Pinnaroo

History
- Opened: 25 June 1912
- Closed: 4 October 2007, Murrayville - Ouyen 9 October 2026

Technical
- Track gauge: 1,600 mm (5 ft 3 in)
- Signalling: Train Order Working

The Pinnaroo Line served the agricultural districts of the Mallee in the Australian states of South Australia and Victoria, principally for the transport of grain. Passenger services on the line ceased in November 1968.

== History ==
The railway was constructed to facilitate the opening up of agricultural land in the area in the 1910s. It was completed from Ouyen to Murrayville in 1912 and extended to Pinnaroo, just over the South Australian border, in 1915.

After the connecting South Australian line was closed in 1996 for conversion to standard gauge, Panitya, just east of the state border, became the terminus.

While the main Adelaide to Wolseley line was closed east of Tailem Bend for gauge conversion, the Pinnaroo line became part of the main line between Adelaide and Melbourne for two weeks during April 1995. Journey times increased by 10 to 12 hours.

The line was booked out of service on 4 October 2007, with the last train having run in September.

As part of the Murray Basin Rail Project, the section of the line from Ouyen to Murrayville was converted to standard gauge in 2018 and upgraded to support 19-tonne axle loading.
