= Murrayville, Victoria =

Murrayville
- Town
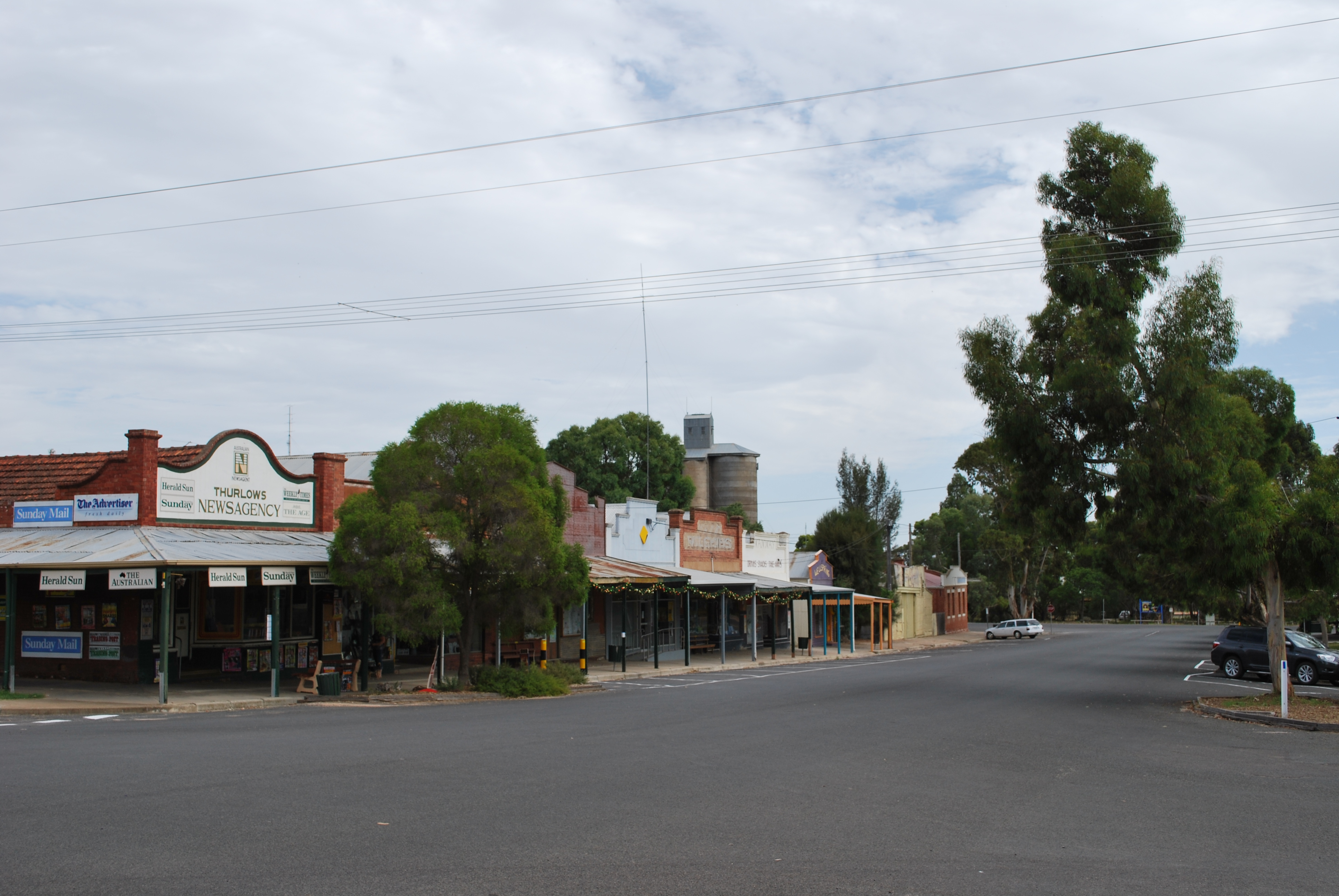
- Reed St, in Murrayville

- Coordinates: 35°15′44″S 141°11′0″E
- Country: Australia
- State: Victoria
- Region: Sunraysia
- LGA: Rural City of Mildura
- Location: 536 km (333 mi) NW of Melbourne; 268 km (167 mi) E of Adelaide; 213 km (132 mi) SW of Mildura; 109 km (68 mi) W of Ouyen; 27 km (17 mi) E of Pinnaroo

Government
  - State electorate: Mildura
  - Federal division: Mallee
- Elevation: 94 m (308 ft)

Population
  - Total: 280 (2016 census)
- Postcode: 3512
Localities around Murrayville
Murray-Sunset	Murray-Sunset	Murray-Sunset
Carina	Murrayville	Cowangie
Big Desert	Big Desert	Big Desert

Murrayville is a town on the section of the Mallee Highway and Pinnaroo railway line between Ouyen and the South Australian border. It is about 24 kilometres (15 mi) east of the South Australian border and 536 kilometres (333 mi) north west of the state capital Melbourne, but 268 kilometres (167 mi) east of Adelaide. At the 2016 census, Murrayville had a population of 280, down from 444 ten years before.

The local school, Murrayville Community College is a P-12 school.

== History ==
The Post Office opened on 1 November 1910. The Murrayville railway station opened in 1912 but is no longer used for passengers.

The area of the locality contains a number of smaller areas namely Duddo which had a post office open from 1913 until 1918, Duddo Wells with a post office from 1914 until 1950, Danyo with a post office from 1912 (when the railway arrived) until 1975, and Goongee.

Murrayville Magistrates' Court closed on 1 January 1983.

== Industry ==
The town's main industry is cereal crops, sheep and cattle, other industries are potato farming and other small crops. Irrigation is only supplied to the potato farms by an underground basin of high quality water.

== Sport and culture ==
The town's dramatic society has been running for 46 years straight.

Golfers play at the Murrayville Golf Club.

During Easter 2010, Murrayville celebrated its centenary. Visitors from all over Australia attended with 1300 dinner meals delivered on the Saturday night and 900 for the Sunday evening meal. Included in the attractions were a collection of antique farm machinery, a display of old cars, an animal nursery, a bucking bull and a dual carriage small motorised train.

== Residents ==
Murrayville is the birthplace of former Formula One driver and six time Bathurst 1000 winner Larry Perkins. Olympic basketballer Rachael Sporn was also born in Murrayville.

== Climate ==
Climate data for Murrayville, elevation 71 m (233 ft)
Month	Jan	Feb	Mar	Apr	May	Jun	Jul	Aug	Sep	Oct	Nov	Dec	Year
Mean daily maximum °C (°F)	30.9 (87.6)	30.4 (86.7)	28.0 (82.4)	22.8 (73.0)	18.5 (65.3)	14.9 (58.8)	14.5 (58.1)	16.2 (61.2)	19.7 (67.5)	23.0 (73.4)	26.9 (80.4)	29.6 (85.3)	23.0 (73.4)
Mean daily minimum °C (°F)	13.0 (55.4)	13.2 (55.8)	10.9 (51.6)	7.9 (46.2)	5.5 (41.9)	3.4 (38.1)	2.9 (37.2)	3.3 (37.9)	4.8 (40.6)	7.2 (45.0)	9.8 (49.6)	12.1 (53.8)	7.8 (46.0)
Average rainfall mm (inches)	19.5 (0.77)	22.5 (0.89)	16.3 (0.64)	22.0 (0.87)	31.4 (1.24)	31.7 (1.25)	33.5 (1.32)	33.5 (1.32)	32.6 (1.28)	32.6 (1.28)	26.5 (1.04)	22.4 (0.88)	324.4 (12.77)
Average rainy days (≥ 1.0 mm)	2.4	2.4	2.6	3.6	5.7	6.7	7.8	7.9	6.2	5.4	4.1	3.2	58.0
Source: Australian Bureau of Meteorology
