= Coally, New South Wales =

Coally Parish, New South Wales New South Wales
- Coordinates: 29.732°S 141.868°E
- Location: 250 km (155 mi) N of Broken Hill, New South Wales; 40 km (25 mi) S of Tibooburra, New South Wales
- LGA(s): Unincorporated Far West Region
- County: Evelyn
- State electorate(s): Barwon
- Federal division(s): Farrer
Mean max temp	Mean min temp	Annual rainfall
?	6 °C; 43 °F	?

Coally is a remote rural locality and civil parish of Evelyn County, New South Wales in far northwest New South Wales located at 29°51′00″S 141°50′39″E.

== Geography ==
The geography of the Parish is mostly the flat, arid landscape of the Channel Country. The parish has a Köppen climate classification of BWh (Hot desert). The nearest town is Tibooburra to the north, which is on the Silver City Highway and lies south of the Sturt National Park.

== History ==
The Parish is on the traditional lands of the Wadigali and to a lesser extent Karenggapa, Aboriginal peoples.

In April 1529 Spain and Portugal divided the world between themselves with the Treaty of Zaragoza. Unknown to the Yarli peoples, the dividing line passed through what would be the parish.

Charles Sturt passed to the west of the parish and camped for six months at nearby Preservation Creek, during 1845.

In 1861 the Burke and Will's expedition passed to the east. Gold was discovered nearby in the 1870s.
