= Scott Parish, New South Wales =

Scott Parish
- other
- Coordinates: 29.732°S 141.868°E
- Country: Australia
- State: New South Wales

Scott Parish, New South Wales is a remote rural locality and civil parish of Evelyn County, New South Wales in far northwest New South Wales. located at 29°38′31″S 142°01′00″E.

The parish is located on Warratta Creek between Milparinka and Tibooburra to the north.

== Geography ==
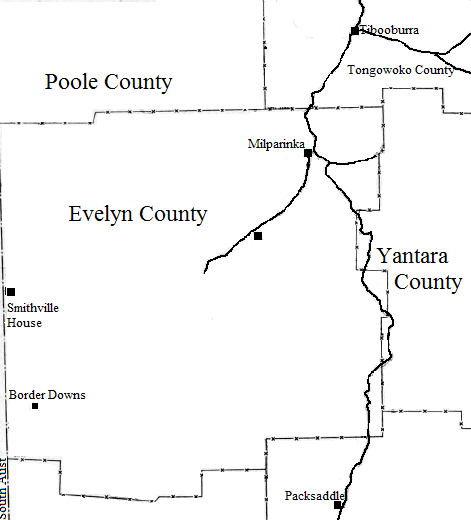
Map of Evelyn County

The geography of Scott Parish is mostly the flat, arid landscape of the Channel Country. The nearest town is Tibooburra to the east, which is on the Silver City Highway and lies south of the Sturt National Park.

The parish has a Köppen climate classification of BWh (Hot desert).

== History ==
The Parish is on the traditional lands of the Wadigali and to a lesser extent Karenggapa, Aboriginal peoples.

In April 1529 Spain and Portugal divided the world between themselves with the Treaty of Zaragoza, their dividing line passed through the parish.

Charles Sturt passed through the area and camping for six months at nearby Preservation Creek, in during 1845,

In 1861 the Burke and Will's expedition passed to the east. Gold was discovered nearby in the 1870s.
