= Utah, New South Wales =

Rural locality and civil parish in New South Wales, Australia

Utah Parish, New South Wales is a remote rural locality and civil parish of Evelyn County in far northwest New South Wales. located at 30°04′48″S 142°03′23″E.

== Geography ==
The geography of Sturt is mostly the flat, arid landscape of the Channel Country. The nearest town is Tibooburra to the north, which is on the Silver City Highway, and south of the Sturt National Park.

== History ==
The Parish is on the traditional lands of the Wadigali and to a lesser extent Karenggapa, Aboriginal peoples.

In April 1529 Spain and Portugal divided the world between themselves with the Treaty of Zaragoza. Unknown to the Wadigali, their dividing line passed through the parish.

Charles Sturt passed to the west of the parish during 1845, camping for 6 months at nearby Preservation Creek.

In 1861 the Burke and Wills expedition passed to the east.

Gold was discovered in the area in the 1870s.
