= Wirratcha, New South Wales =

Wirratcha
- Coordinates: 29.732°S 141.868°E
- Country: Australia
- State: New South Wales

Wirratcha Parish is a remote rural locality and civil parish of Evelyn County in far northwest New South Wales, located at 29°38′31″S 142°01′00″E.

== Geography ==
The geography of the parish is mostly the flat, arid landscape of the Channel Country. The parish has a Köppen climate classification of BWh (hot desert). The nearest town is Tibooburra to the east, which is on the Silver City Highway and lies south of the Sturt National Park.

== History ==
The parish is on the traditional lands of the Wadigali and to a lesser extent Karenggapa, Aboriginal peoples.

In April 1529 Spain and Portugal divided the world between themselves with the Treaty of Zaragoza. Unknown to the Yarli peoples, their dividing line passed through what would become the parish.

Charles Sturt passed through the area and camping for six months at nearby Preservation Creek, in 1845.

In 1861 the Burke and Wills expedition passed to the east.

Gold was discovered nearby in the 1870s.
