= Mount Blackwood, New South Wales =

Mount Blackwood New South Wales
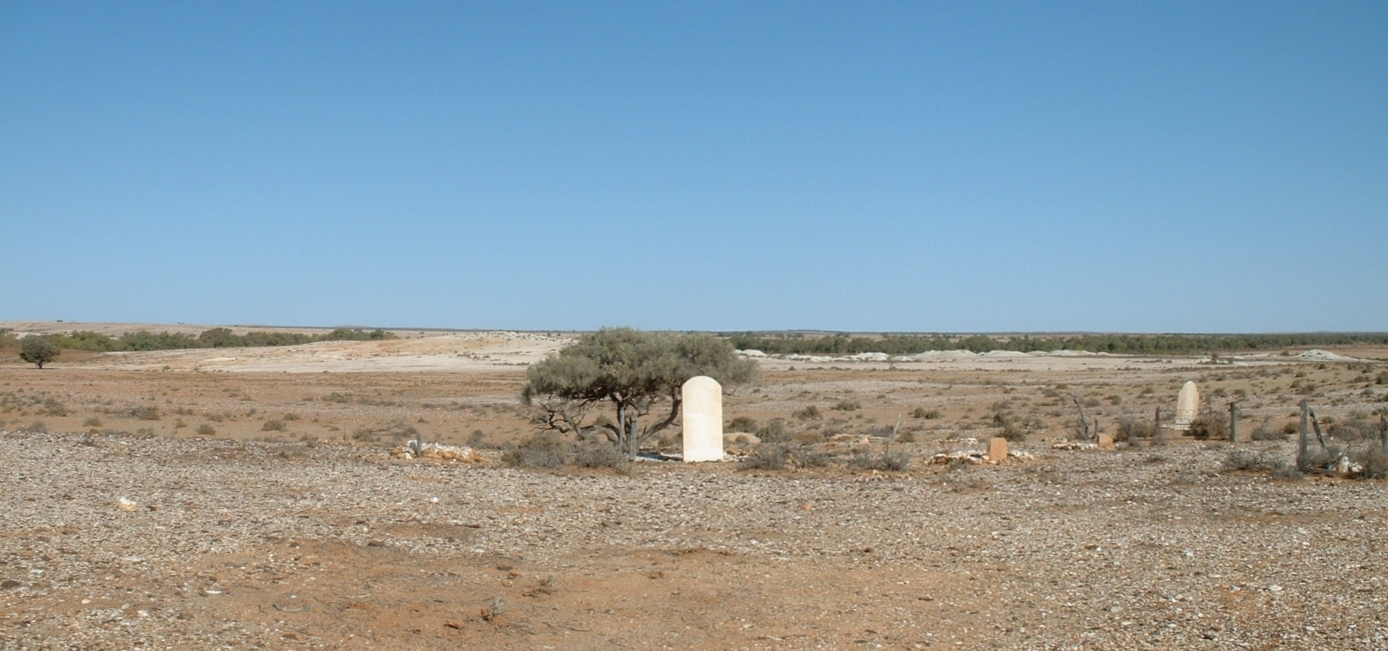
- Country around Mount Blackwood

- Coordinates: 29.732°S 141.868°E
- Population: 0 (2016 census)
- Location: 250 km (155 mi) N of Broken Hill, New South Wales; 40 km (25 mi) S of Tibooburra, New South Wales
- LGA(s): Unincorporated Far West Region
- County: Evelyn
- State electorate(s): Barwon
- Federal division(s): Farrer
Mean max temp	Mean min temp	Annual rainfall
?	6 °C; 43 °F	?

Mount Blackwood, New South Wales located at 29°48′37″S 141°31′10″E, is a remote rural locality and civil parish of Evelyn County in far northwest New South Wales. located at 30°04′42″S 142°45′50″E, east of the Silver City Highway . The geography of the parish is mostly the flat, arid landscape of the Channel Country. The parish has a Köppen climate classification of BWh (Hot desert).

The nearest town is Tibooburra to the northwest, which is on the Silver City Highway and it lies south of the Sturt National Park.

== History ==
The Parish is on the traditional lands of the Wadigali and to a lesser extent Karenggapa, Aboriginal peoples.

Charles Sturt passed through the area, camping for six months at nearby Preservation Creek, in 1845,

In 1861 the Burke and Wills expedition passed to the east.

Gold was discovered nearby in the 1870s.
