= Parish of Paradise (Evelyn County) =

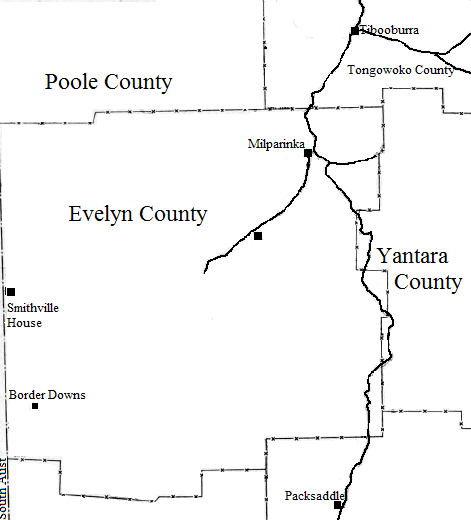
Evelyn County.

Parish of Paradise, New South Wales is a remote civil parish of Evelyn County, New South Wales in far northwest New South Wales. located at 29.850000°S 141.844167°E on the border with South Australia.

== Geography ==
The geography of the Parish is mostly the flat, arid landscape of the Channel Country. The parish has a Köppen climate classification of BWh (Hot desert). The nearest town is Tibooburra to the north, which is on the Silver City Highway and lies south of the Sturt National Park.

== History ==
The Parish is on the traditional lands of the Wadigali and to a lesser extent Karenggapa, Aboriginal peoples.

When James Cook claimed New South Wales for Great Britain from Possession Island." he claimed the territory up to the 141st meridian east making the Parish on the border of that claim.

Charles Sturt passed to the west of the parish and camped for six months at nearby Preservation Creek, during 1845.

In 1861 the Burke and Wills expedition passed to the east. Gold was discovered nearby in the 1870s.
