= Pingbilly, New South Wales =

Rural locality in Australia

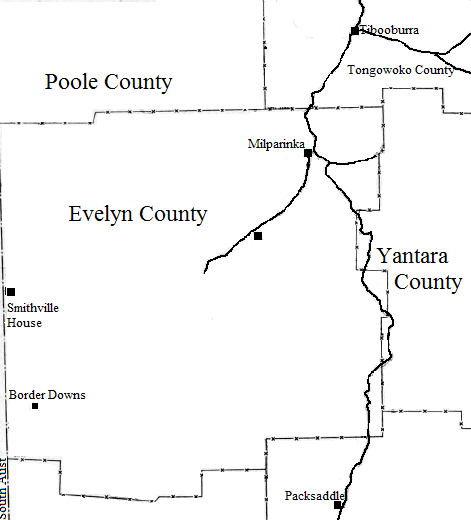
Evelyn County map.

Pingbilly, New South Wales is a remote rural locality and civil parish of Evelyn County, New South Wales in far northwest New South Wales.

The geography of the Parish is mostly the flat, arid landscape of the Channel Country. The parish has a Köppen climate classification of BWh (Hot desert). The nearest town is Tibooburra to the north, which is on the Silver City Highway and lies south of the Sturt National Park.

The Parish is located at 30°07′11″S 141°34′06″E in the arid semi desert midway between Packsaddle, New South Wales and Milparinka, New South Wales.
