= Punnyakunya, New South Wales =

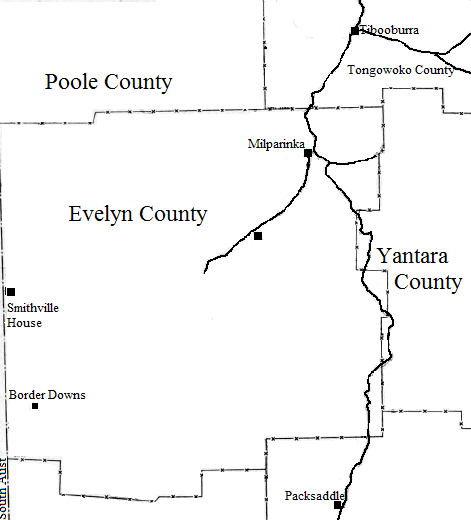
Evelyn County map.

Punnyakunya, New South Wales is a remote rural locality and civil parish of Evelyn County, New South Wales in far northwest New South Wales.

The geography of the Parish is mostly the flat, arid landscape of the Channel Country. The parish has a Köppen climate classification of BWh (Hot desert). The nearest town is Tibooburra to the north, which is on the Silver City Highway and lies south of the Sturt National Park.

Punnyakunya is located on Yandaminta Creek at 29°58′45″S 141°15′42″ near the South Australian Border, in the arid semi desert north of Packsaddle, New South Wales.
