= King, New South Wales =

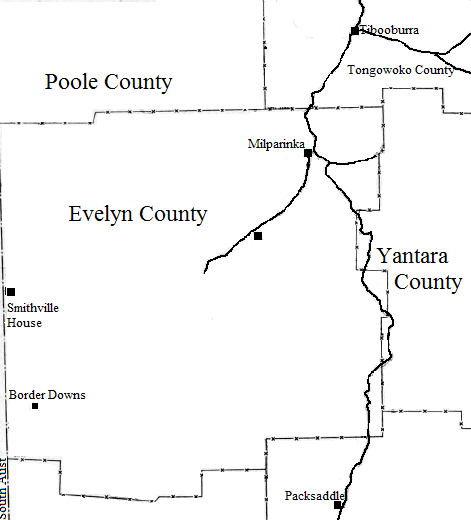
A map of Evelyn County in New South Wales.

King Parish, New South Wales is a remote rural locality and civil parish of Evelyn County in far northwest New South Wales, Australia.

The parish is located at 29°47′23″S 142°00′00″E near Tibooburra. The geography of Stewart is mostly the flat, arid landscape of the Channel Country.

== History ==
The parish is on the traditional lands of the Wadigali and Malyangaba people and to a lesser extent Karenggapa, Aboriginal peoples.

April 1529 Spain and Portugal divided the world between themselves with the Treaty of Zaragoza, their dividing line passed through the parish.

Charles Sturt passed by the parish during 1845, and camped at Preservation Creek to the north for six months.

In 1861 the Burke and Wills expedition passed to the east.

Gold was discovered nearby in the Albert Goldfield in 1880. In June 1902 a large meteorite landed at nearby Mt Brown. Temperatures in the area can reach 50 °C.
