= Whitty, New South Wales =

Whitty is a remote rural locality and civil parish of Evelyn County in far northwest New South Wales. located at 30°12′34″S 141°05′06″E.

== Geography ==
The geography of the parish is mostly the flat, arid landscape of the Channel Country. The nearest town is Tibooburra to the east, which is on the Silver City Highway and lies south of the Sturt National Park. The western boundary of the parish is the South Australian border.

== History ==
The parish is on the traditional lands of the Wadigali Aboriginal peoples.

The parish has a Köppen climate classification of BWh (Hot desert).

Charles Sturt passed through the area during 1845, In 1861 the Burke and Wills expedition passed to the east.
