= Yandaminta, New South Wales =

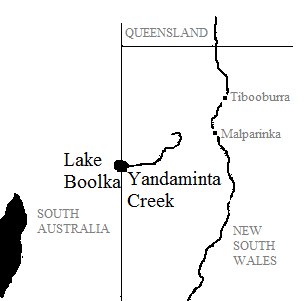
Map of Yandaminta Creek in Far Western New South Wales

Yandaminta Parish is a remote rural locality and civil parish of Evelyn County, New South Wales in far northwest New South Wales.

The geography of the Parish is mostly the flat, arid landscape of the Channel Country. The nearest town is Tibooburra to the north, which is on the Silver City Highway and lies south of the Sturt National Park.

The Parish is named for Yandaminta Creek which flows through the area.
