= Wonominta, New South Wales =

Rural locality and civil parish in New South Wales, Australia

Wonominta, New South Wales is a remote rural locality and civil parish of Evelyn County in far northwest New South Wales. located at 30°18′40″S 141°05′05″E.

== Geography ==
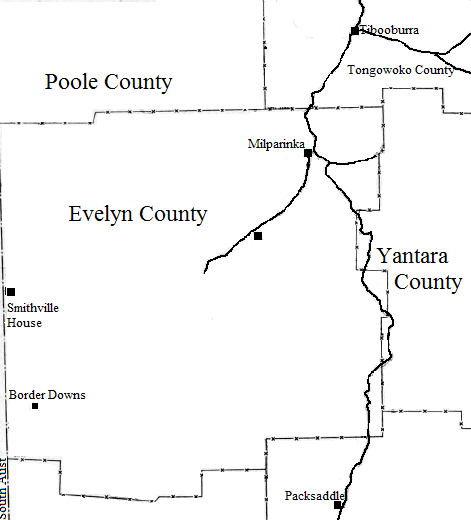
Evelyn County map

The geography of the Parish is mostly the flat, arid landscape of the Channel Country. The parish has a Köppen climate classification of BWh (Hot desert). The nearest town is Tibooburra to the northeast, which is on the Silver City Highway and lies south of the Sturt National Park.

The parish includes Bullea Lake and Green Lake, and the parish is on the Silver City Highway.

The area around Wonominta Creek is almost unpopulated, with less than two inhabitants per square kilometer.

== Climate ==
The landscape is flat, arid desert with a hot desert climate. The annual average temperature is 23 °C. The warmest month is January, when the average temperature is 34 °C, and the coldest is June, at 10 °C. The average annual average is 306 millimetres. The rainy month is February, with an average of 109 mm rainfall, and the driest is October, with 1 mm rainfall.

== History ==
The Parish is on the traditional lands of the Wadigali Aboriginal peoples.

Charles Sturt passed through the area during 1845, and in 1861 the Burke and Wills expedition passed to the east.
