= Utah Parish, New South Wales =

Utah Parish, New South Wales is a remote rural locality and civil parish of Evelyn County, New South Wales in far northwest New South Wales.

The geography of the Parish is mostly the flat, arid landscape of the Channel Country. The parish has a Köppen climate classification of BWh (Hot desert). The nearest town is Tibooburra to the north, which is on the Silver City Highway and lies south of the Sturt National Park.
