= Gununah Parish, New South Wales =

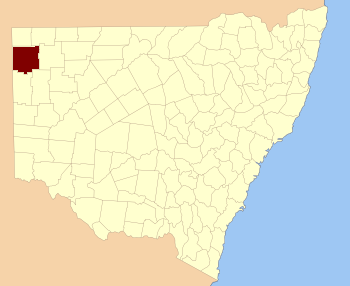
Map of Evelyn County.

Gununah Parish located at 30.000833°S 141.977222°E is a remote rural locality and civil parish of Evelyn County, New South Wales in far northwest New South Wales. located at 29°50′23″S 141°08′05″E. on the border with South Australia.

== Geography ==
The geography of the Parish is mostly the flat, arid landscape of the Channel Country. The parish has a Köppen climate classification of BWh (Hot desert). The nearest town is Tibooburra to the north, which is on the Silver City Highway and lies south of the Sturt National Park. The Parish itself is on the Silver City Highway where it meets Mount Brown Creek. Mount Brown Creek enters Bullea Lake some kilometres to the south.
