= Orr, New South Wales =

Orr Parish New South Wales
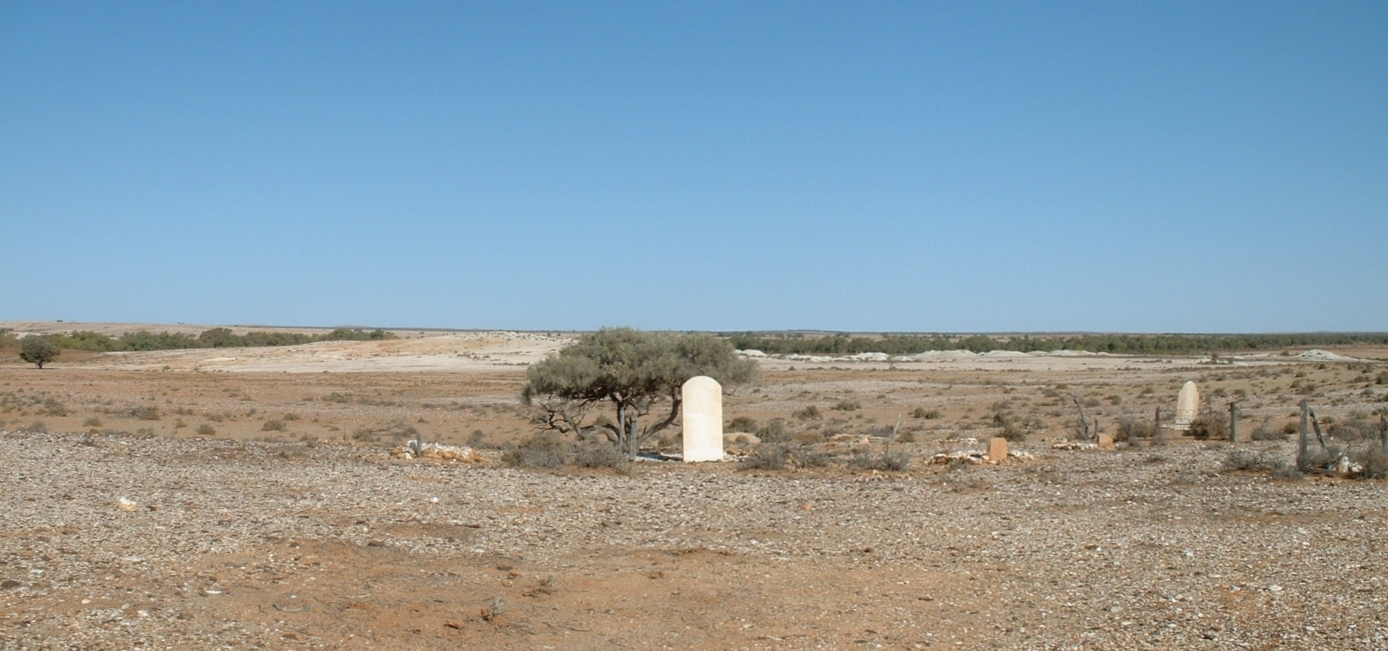
- Country around Orr Parish

- Coordinates: 29.732°S 141.868°E
- Postcode(s): 2880
- Location: 250 km (155 mi) N of Broken Hill, New South Wales; 40 km (25 mi) S of Tibooburra, New South Wales
- LGA(s): Unincorporated Far West Region
- County: Evelyn
- State electorate(s): Barwon
- Federal division(s): Farrer
Mean max temp	Mean min temp	Annual rainfall
?	6 °C; 43 °F	?

Orr Parish is a remote rural locality and civil parish of Evelyn County, New South Wales. The landscape of the Parish is flat arid semi-desert of the Channel Country and the population is less than 1 person per 134.63km². The parish has a Köppen climate classification of BWh (Hot desert). The only settlement in the Parish is the village of Milparinka. The entire parish is unincorporated.
