= Wygah, New South Wales =

Parish in New South Wales, Australia

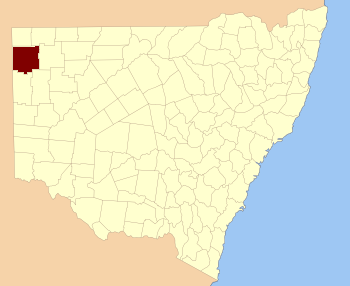
Map of Evelyn County

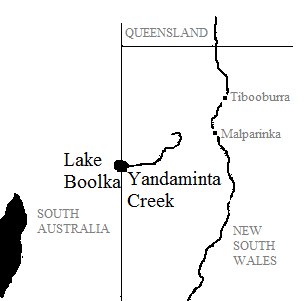
Map of Yandaminta Creek in Far Western New South Wales

The Parish of Wygah, New South Wales located at 30°00′35″S 141°37′52″ is a remote rural locality and civil parish of Evelyn County, New South Wales in far northwest New South Wales.

The geography of the Parish is mostly the flat, arid landscape of the Channel Country. The parish has a Köppen climate classification of BWh (Hot desert). The Parish is located at 30°00′35″S 141°37′52″ between Milparinka and Tibooburra to the north and Broken Hill, New South Wales to the south. Lake Wallace Creek and Yandaminta Creek both flow through the parish which is otherwise arid.

The area around Yandaminta Creek is almost unpopulated, with less than one person per 150km^{2}. The landscape is flat, arid desert with a hot desert climate. The annual average temperature is 23 °C. The warmest month is January, when the average temperature is 34 °C, and the coldest is June, at 10 °C. The average annual average is 306 millimetres. The rainy month is February, with an average of 109 mm rainfall, and the driest is October, with 1 mm rainfall.
