= Parish of Arnheim, New South Wales =

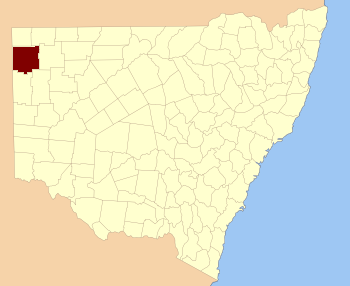
Map of Evelyn County.

Arnheim Parish is a remote rural locality and civil parish of Evelyn County, New South Wales in far northwest New South Wales. located at 29.5100°S 141.5039°E.

The geography of the Parish is mostly the flat, arid landscape of the Channel Country. The parish has a Köppen climate classification of BWh (Hot desert). The nearest town is Tibooburra to the north, which is on the Silver City Highway and lies south of the Sturt National Park.
