= Wobaduck, New South Wales =

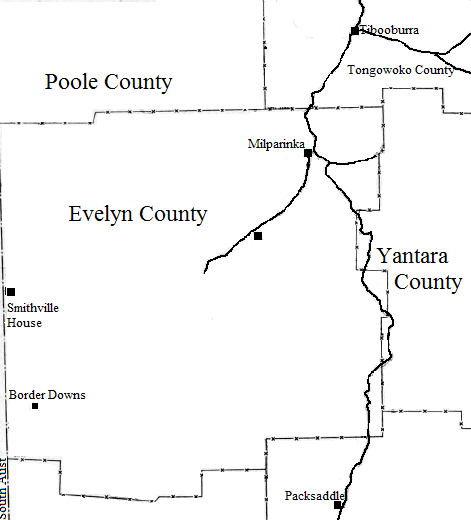
Map of Evelyn County

Wobaduck, New South Wales is a remote rural locality and civil parish of Evelyn County, New South Wales in far northwest New South Wales.

The geography of Wheeland Parish is mostly the flat, arid landscape of the Channel Country. The parish has a Köppen climate classification of BWh (Hot desert). The nearest town is Tibooburra to the north, which is on the Silver City Highway and lies south of the Sturt National Park.
