= Parish of Boulka, New South Wales =

Location in New south wales

The Parish of Boulka, New South Wales is a remote rural locality and civil parish of Evelyn County, New South Wales in far northwest New South Wales. The parish is at 30.0059°S 141.0550°E.

The geography of the Parish is mostly the flat, arid landscape of the Channel Country. The parish has a Köppen climate classification of BWh (Hot desert). The nearest town is Tibooburra to the north, which is on the Silver City Highway and lies south of the Sturt National Park.
