= Wydjah, New South Wales =

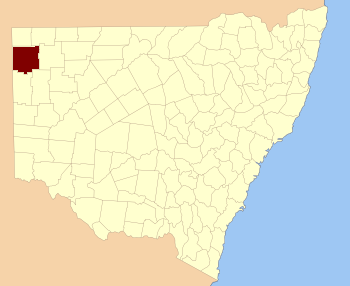
Map of Evelyn County.

The Parish of Wydjah located at 30°00′35″S 141°37′52″ is a remote rural locality and civil parish of Evelyn County, New South Wales in far northwest New South Wales.

The geography of the Parish is mostly the flat, arid landscape of the Channel Country an arid desert with a hot desert climate. The Parish is located at 30°00′35″S 141°37′52″ between Milparinka and Tibooburra to the north and Broken Hill, New South Wales to the south. Wydijah, is on Gum Creek which flows into Bullea Lake to the east. The annual average temperature is 23 °C. The warmest month is January, when the average temperature is 34 °C, and the coldest is June, at 10 °C. The average annual average is 306 millimeters. The rainy month is February, with an average of 109 mm rainfall, and the driest is October, with 1 mm rainfall.

The area around Yandaminta Creek is almost unpopulated, with less than two inhabitants per square kilometer.
