= Albert Goldfield Ruins =

Albert Goldfield
- Location within New South Wales Location within Australia
- 29.5966°S 141.8390°E
- Location: Silver City Highway, Milparinka, 25km south of Tibooburra, New South Wales, Australia

History
- Built: 1880–

Site notes
- Owner: Office of Environment and Heritage

New South Wales Heritage Register
- Official name: Albert Goldfield / Warratta Town
- Type: state heritage (archaeological-terrestrial)
- Designated: 2 April 1999
- Reference no.: 975
- Type: Mineral Discovery site
- Category: Mining and Mineral Processing

The Albert Goldfield Ruins is a heritage-listed former gold mining area on the Silver City Highway, Milparinka about 25 km south of Tibooburra, New South Wales, Australia. Surviving remnants of the larger Albert Goldfield, they were built from 1880. It was added to the New South Wales State Heritage Register on 2 April 1999.

== History ==
Gold was first discovered in the area during October 1880, when John Thompson and a friend found payable gold at Mt Poole. About five months later James Evans found about 14 ounces of alluvial gold at Mount Brown. News of the find caused a rush to this remote location. As the country was opened up, rushes also occurred at Easter Monday, Good Friday, Nuggety Hill, The Granites and many other areas as gold was found. Reefs such as the Pioneer and Warratta Creek were found. In a very short space of time an auriferous belt some 50 miles by 10 had been opened up.

This became known as the Albert goldfield with Milparinka as the main settlement. Milparinka is an Aboriginal word meaning water can be found here. As there was no water at Mt Browne, the miner's chose to camp at Evelyn Creek, which later became known as Milparinka.

The discovery of gold at Mt Browne, some twenty miles south of Mt Poole was announced in February 1881 amid much scepticism from the print media. Newspapers warned prospective miners of the many deaths from thirst and heat which had occurred when a similar rush had occurred 150 miles south of Mt Poole. Despite these dire warnings, over one thousand men soon flocked to the site of the new discovery. The Albert or Mt Browne goldrush had begun.

The Albert Goldfield was declared in early 1881. By the end of 1881, several of the 25 quartz claims near Warratta Creek had been formed into public companies, based in Melbourne and Adelaide. It was reported that gold showed freely in the quartz veins, but the Mining Warden warned that shortages of timber, firewood and the high cost of transporting materials and equipment would make the cost of extraction high.

Conditions were harsh and miners tended to converge on sites where water, no matter how small the amount, existed. Such supplies were quickly exhausted. Water shortages prompted the carting of excavated soil from Mt Browne to Milparinka for washing. Other miners resorted to dry-blowing to extract the gold. At times, neither teams of bullocks or horses could transport supplies into the field and miners were reported to go for days without flour, subsisting on mutton and "wild spinach" which grew near the creeks. Camel trains, travelling overland from Beltana in South Australia were introduced to help alleviate transportation problems. Illness also took its toll on the miners. In 1882 temporary hospitals had to be established at Milparinka and Tibooburra as scurvy and ophthalmia (Barcoo Rot) were rife and there were many deaths from dysentery and a fever similar to typhoid fever.

Albert Town was established in 1882 and sits between two arms of Warratta Creek. Warratta Reef (later known as The Reefs), discovered in 1881 as part of the initial exploration of the Albert Goldfield, and worked continuously from that time onwards is immediately to the west, while the Pioneer, Elizabeth, Phoenix and Rosemount reefs are to the east of the creek.

Warratta Reef was mined by trenching following particular visible quartz seams and other exploratory trenches running across the line of reefs to intercept buried reefs. A number of shafts and shallow holes were dug. Because of the aridity of the area the technique of dry-blowing was a major source of gold yield. Initially this was through dish winnowing, and later machines were developed.

The goldfield had a great impact on the remote region, bringing a range of resources, including goods, labour, capital investment and public awareness to the Corner Country. The influx of resources can be seen in how the area competed, although only for a year or two, with Silverton as a successful centre in the far west of New South Wales.

By the end of 1882 the goldfield had settled into an established demographic pattern which saw Milparinka and Tibooburra as the major centres, Mt Browne as a struggling community with sporadic bursts of alluvial mining and Albert as a struggling community which was abandoned before the turn of the century.

While initially producing 11,900 ounces in 1881 gold production declined markedly with only 387 ounces produced in 1906. Both the drought and Depression of the 1890s severally impacted on the Albert Goldfield and can be related to the decline in production.

== Description ==
Albert Goldfield and Albert Town are situated approximately 25 kilometres south of Tibooburra along the Silver City Highway. Nine structures built of local stone are standing above the surface of the ground and another three masonry structures are fairly close to the ground. The remains are spread over an area of c. 50 metres north - south and 150 metres east - west. The masonry structures generally consist of fireplaces and wall alignments mostly constructed of mass angular sedimentary chunks of slate. Evidence of superstructures is limited.

The overall integrity and intactness of the structures were reported as high as at 31 March 2006 allowing their form, function and interrelationship to be easily established. The archaeological remains are particularly illustrative and informative of geological and mining techniques of the period and have the potential to provide further research information relating to the miners responses to their surroundings, especially distance from service and population centres, aridity, the area's geology and the skewed sex ratios of the area.

Integrity and intactness are high. Almost all of the structures retain enough original fabric to allow their form, function and interrelationship to be easily established.

== Heritage listing ==
The Albert Goldfield is of state significance. It irrevocably altered the nature of the northwest of the state, giving it considerable regional importance. It was the first mining locality to tap into the arid country mineral fields of Australia and as such paved the way for the mineral exploration of the Australian interior using a range of technologies for arid country goldmining that originated on the Albert Goldfield. The overall integrity and intactness of the structures is high allowing their form, function and interrelationship to be easily established. The archaeological remains are particularly illustrative and informative of geological and mining techniques of the period and have the potential to provide further research information relating to the miners responses to their surroundings, especially distance from service and population centres, aridity, the area's geology and the skewed sex ratios of the area.

Albert Goldfield was listed on the New South Wales State Heritage Register on 2 April 1999 having satisfied the following criteria.

The place is important in demonstrating the course, or pattern, of cultural or natural history in New South Wales.

Has a national significant because the Albert Goldfield was the first mining locality to tap into the arid country mineral fields of Australia, and as such paved the way for mineral exploration of the Australian interior. The Albert Goldfield saw the start of a range of technologies being developed for arid country gold mining which were used to great effect elsewhere in the Northern Territory, Queensland and especially Western Australia. It was effectively, the springboard for the desert goldfields of Australia.

The place is important in demonstrating aesthetic characteristics and/or a high degree of creative or technical achievement in New South Wales.

The setting of the Albert Goldfield and Albert Town are aesthetically pleasing as an arid landscape. The appearance of the building remains, ash heaps, mining trenches and other cultural remains within the complex is evocative of the romance of the historical period of gold mining.

The place has strong or special association with a particular community or cultural group in New South Wales for social, cultural or spiritual reasons.

Albert Goldfield is socially significant as Albert Town and the Albert Goldfield reveal the responses of the miners to their surroundings, especially distance from service and population centres, aridity, the area's geology and the skewed sex ratios of the area.

The place has potential to yield information that will contribute to an understanding of the cultural or natural history of New South Wales.

That distinctive Australian arid country adaptation for gold prospecting, dry-blowing originated on the Albert Goldfield. Some of the archaeological remains are particularly illustrative and informative of geological and mining techniques of the period, while other remains can contribute useful information on the lifestyles of miners and others, all of which has the capacity to contribute to a range of pertinent research issues in historical archaeology and social history.

The place possesses uncommon, rare or endangered aspects of the cultural or natural history of New South Wales.

Albert Goldfield is the oldest Australian example of the response to gold prospecting in arid conditions in the form of dry-blowing.

The place is important in demonstrating the principal characteristics of a class of cultural or natural places/environments in New South Wales.

Albert Goldfield is representative of a unique response to mining in an arid environment.
