= Cobham Lake =

Lake in New South Wales, Australia

- Location within New South Wales
- Location: New South Wales, Australia
- Coordinates: 30°09′00″S 142°05′25″E
- Type: lake
- Surface area: 580 hectares (1,400 acres)

Cobham Lake, when full, covers an area of around 580 hectares (1,400 acres) and is located in New South Wales, Australia. Cobham Lake is south of Milparinka between Green Lake and Salt Lake, the water is fresh and pure, reeds grow lushly and birds are in abundance. The lake is beside the Silver City Highway.

Prior to European settlement the area around Evelyn Creek, a feeder for the lake, was a meeting place for the Maliangaapa and other tribal groups from as far away as the Paroo River.

Charles Sturt passed the lake in 1844, and there are rumours there was a massacre at the lake in the early 20th century.

Cobham Lake Station is a cattle station, located near the lake .
