= Yancarraman, New South Wales =

Coordinates: 30°30′25″S 141°30′21″E

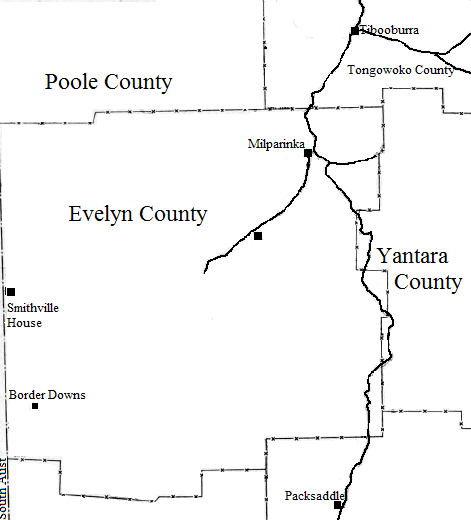
A map of Evelyn County in New South Wales.

Yancarraman, located at, is a civil parish of Evelyn County, New South Wales, Australia.

The parish has a Köppen climate classification of BWh (Hot desert).

The parish is on the traditional lands of Yarli peoples.
