= Utah (disambiguation) =

Utah is a state in the United States.

Utah may also refer to:

== Places ==
- Utah, Illinois, an unincorporated community
- Utah, Indiana, a community in Indiana, United States
- Utah, New South Wales, a parish in Australia
- Utah County, Utah
- Juttah, biblical town

== People with the name ==
- Utah Phillips (1935–2008), American labor activist and singer
- Johnny Utah, a fictional character and main protagonist of the action film Point Break, played by Keanu Reeves and Luke Bracey.

== Other uses ==
- Utah (film), a 1945 film
- USS Utah (BB-31), an American battleship
- Utah Jazz, an NBA team
- Utah Mammoth, an NHL team
- University of Utah, a public university in Utah
  - Utah Utes, the above school's athletic program
- Utah teapot
- "Utah", a song by John Linnell from the album State Songs, 1999

== See also ==
- Utah Beach, code name for landing beach in Operation Overlord
- Utah Lake
- Utah State University
- Utah War, conflict between Mormons and United States
- Utah v. Evans, 2002 U.S. Supreme Court case on the use of statistical techniques in the census
