= Evelyn County, New South Wales =

Evelyn New South Wales
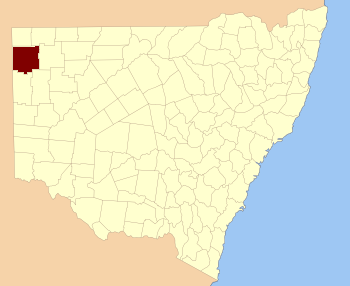
- Location in New South Wales
Lands administrative divisions around Evelyn:
| South Australia | Poole | Tongowoko |
| South Australia | Evelyn | Yantara |
| South Australia | Farnell | Mootwingee |

Evelyn County is one of the 141 cadastral divisions of New South Wales, Australia.

Evelyn County is named in honour of Police Magistrate Evelyn Pitfield Shirley Sturt (1816–1885) who was the brother of Charles Sturt.

== Parishes within this county ==
A full list of parishes found within this county; their current LGA and mapping coordinates to the approximate centre of each location is as follows:

| Parish | LGA | Coordinates |
|---|---|---|
| Arnheim | Unincorporated | 30°03′54″S 141°50′40″E |
| Boulka | Unincorporated | 30°00′59″S 141°05′50″E |
| Broughton | Unincorporated | 30°21′42″S 141°14′36″E |
| Bullia | Unincorporated | 30°18′31″S 141°39′57″E |
| Coally | Unincorporated | 29°51′00″S 141°50′39″E |
| Coopayandra | Unincorporated | 30°19′40″S 141°50′00″E |
| Essie | Unincorporated | 29°50′23″S 141°08′05″E |
| Gayer | Unincorporated | 30°21′50″S 142°00′06″E |
| Gidgee | Unincorporated | 29°54′11″S 141°21′10″E |
| Gununah | Unincorporated | 30°00′03″S 141°58′38″E |
| Haynes | Unincorporated | 30°24′24″S 141°04′48″E |
| King | Unincorporated | 29°47′23″S 142°00′00″E |
| Marracoota | Unincorporated | 30°27′28″S 141°30′23″E |
| Milparinka | Unincorporated | 29°43′39″S 141°51′08″E |
| Milring | Unincorporated | 29°54′29″S 141°40′53″E |
| Moolook | Unincorporated | 30°09′04″S 141°07′08″E |
| Mount Blackwood | Unincorporated | 29°48′37″S 141°31′10″E |
| Nardoo | Unincorporated | 30°14′06″S 141°21′35″E |
| Orr | Unincorporated | 29°47′37″S 141°49′55″E |
| Packsaddle | Unincorporated | 30°30′01″S 141°40′39″E |
| Paradise | Unincorporated | 29°40′04″S 141°08′05″E |
| Pidgerie | Unincorporated | 30°05′07″S 141°22′09″E |
| Pingally | Unincorporated | 30°12′31″S 141°29′32″E |
| Pingbilly | Unincorporated | 30°07′11″S 141°34′06″E |
| Punnyakunya | Unincorporated | 29°58′45″S 141°15′42″E |
| Quinyambi | Unincorporated | 30°18′40″S 141°05′05″E |
| Rocky Glen | Unincorporated | 29°39′28″S 141°41′10″E |
| Sanpah | Unincorporated | 30°32′10″S 141°21′43″E |
| Scott | Unincorporated | 29°38′31″S 142°01′00″E |
| Utah | Unincorporated | 30°04′48″S 142°03′23″E |
| Wheeland | Unincorporated | 30°15′37″S 141°14′37″E |
| Whitty | Unincorporated | 30°12′34″S 141°05′06″E |
| Wirratcha | Unincorporated | 29°50′55″S 142°00′44″E |
| Wobaduck | Unincorporated | 30°26′00″S 141°13′42″E |
| Wonominta | Unincorporated | 30°15′16″S 142°00′06″E |
| Wydjah | Unincorporated | 30°00′35″S 141°37′52″E |
| Wygah | Unincorporated | 30°01′02″S 141°25′22″E |
| Yancarraman | Unincorporated | 30°30′25″S 141°30′21″E |
| Yandama | Unincorporated | 29°40′40″S 141°21′10″E |
| Yandaminta | Unincorporated | 29°39′12″S 141°31′10″E |
| Yarramurtie | Unincorporated | 30°10′54″S 141°50′19″E |
