= Packsaddle, New South Wales =

Packsaddle
- Town
- Coordinates: 30°36′37″S 141°57′59″E
- Country: Australia
- State: New South Wales
- LGA: Unincorporated Far West Region

Government
  - State electorate: Barwon
  - Federal division: Parkes

Population
  - Total: 73 (2021 census)
- Postcode: 2880

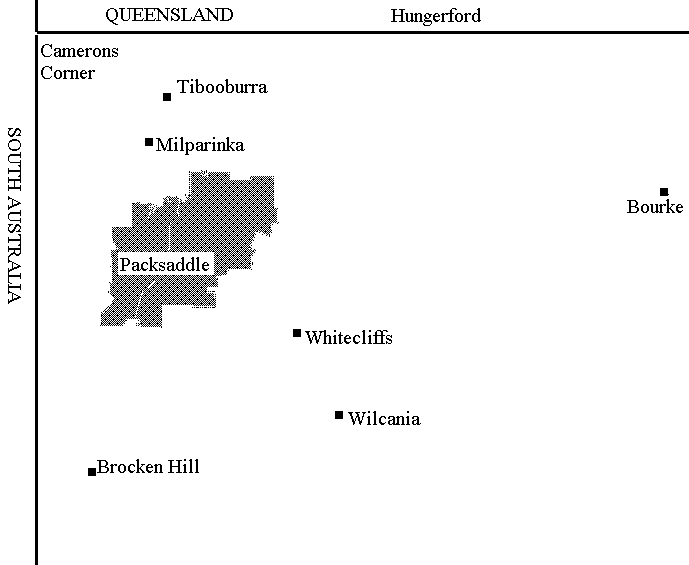
Map of Packsaddle, New South Wales

Packsaddle is a remote township and civil parish of Evelyn County within the Far West Region of New South Wales, Australia. At the 2021 census, Packsaddle had a population of 73.

The parish measured 318500 acres.

The settlement is located where the Silver City Highway crosses the Packsaddle Creek.

The name is said by some to have been given by Burke and Wills who lost a packsaddle while crossing the creek upstream from the modern hamlet.

The area was owned by Goldsbrough Mort & Co. in the 1890s, and Kidman in the 1920s.

A gymkhana is held at Easter time.

The parish has a Köppen climate classification of BWh (Hot desert).
