= Evelyn Creek =

Creek in New South Wales, Australia

Evelyn Creek is a tree lined creek in northwestern New South Wales that flows through Milparinka. The creek begins in a series of gullies south west of Tibooburra and flows generally south to Cobham Lake.

Prior to European settlement Evelyn Creek was a meeting place for the Maliangaapa and other tribal groups from as far away as the Paroo River.

Market gardens were located on the floodplains of the Evelyn Creek near Milparinka, during the 1880s Gold rush.

The creek today supports a varied ecosystem of eucalypts, with fauna including kangaroos, echidnas and birds.

It was named by Charles Sturt in 1844 after his brother, Evelyn.
