= Yandaminta Creek =

Ephemeral stream in New South Wales, Australia

Coordinates: 30°02′S 141°00′E

Yandaminta Creek is an ephemeral stream in Far West New South Wales that flows from near Milparinka to the South Australian border where it enters Lake Boolka. It location is at 30.03333 ° S 141.01667 ° E. Yandaminta Creek starts at an elevation of 216m and drops around 128m over its 159 km length entering the lake at an elevation of 88.4m .

It is located in the state of New South Wales, in the central part of the country, 1,000km northwest of the capital Canberra.

== Geography ==
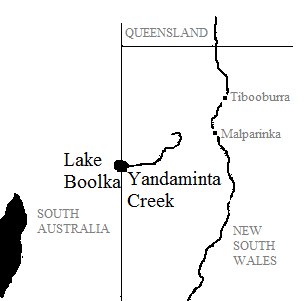
Map of Yandaminta Creek in Far Western New South Wales

The area around Yandaminta Creek is almost unpopulated, with less than two inhabitants per square kilometer.

The landscape is flat, arid desert with a hot desert climate. The annual average temperature is 23 °C. The warmest month is January, when the average temperature is 34 °C, and the coldest is June, at 10 °C. The average annual average is 306 millimetres. The rainy month is February, with an average of 109 mm rainfall, and the driest is October, with 1 mm rainfall.

Mulga (Acacia aneura) shrubland dominates the area. A fringing woodland of River Red Gum (Eucalyptus camaldulensis) is found along the major watercourses. Floodplain country supports various chenopods and native grasses. On some shallow depressions communities of Lignum (Muehlenbeckia cunninghamii) and Canegrass (Eragrastis australasica) exist.

This name is analysable as yarnta meaning "stone" and "mintha" a neutral suffix.
