= 142nd meridian east =

Line of longitude

142nd meridian east (interactive map)

The 142nd meridian east of Greenwich is a line of longitude that extends from the North Pole across the Arctic Ocean, Asia, the Pacific Ocean, Australasia, the Indian Ocean, the Southern Ocean, and Antarctica to the South Pole.

The 142nd meridian east is the estimated location of the boundary between Spain and Portugal (as per the Treaty of Zaragoza) signed on 22 April 1529. Consequently, at Possession Island 142°24'E, just before sunset on Wednesday 22 August 1770, Captain Cook declared the coast to be British territory in the name of King George III. The Coast to the west was already Dutch territory.

The 142nd meridian east forms a great circle with the 38th meridian west.

== From Pole to Pole ==
Starting at the North Pole and heading south to the South Pole, the 142nd meridian east passes through:

Co-ordinates	Country, territory or sea	Notes
90°0′N 142°0′E	Arctic Ocean	
76°3′N 142°0′E	Russia	Sakha Republic — Kotelny Island, New Siberian Islands
74°55′N 142°0′E	East Siberian Sea	Sannikov Strait
73°55′N 142°0′E	Russia	Sakha Republic — Great Lyakhovsky Island, New Siberian Islands
73°16′N 142°0′E	East Siberian Sea	Laptev Strait
72°43′N 142°0′E	Russia	Sakha Republic; Khabarovsk Krai — from 62°1′N 142°0′E
58°59′N 142°0′E	Sea of Okhotsk	
53°28′N 142°0′E	Russia	Sakhalin Oblast — island of Sakhalin
51°31′N 142°0′E	Strait of Tartary	
48°56′N 142°0′E	Russia	Sakhalin Oblast — island of Sakhalin
48°30′N 142°0′E	Strait of Tartary	
47°39′N 142°0′E	Russia	Sakhalin Oblast — island of Sakhalin
47°16′N 142°0′E	Strait of Tartary	
46°56′N 142°0′E	Russia	Sakhalin Oblast — island of Sakhalin
45°58′N 142°0′E	La Pérouse Strait	
45°28′N 142°0′E	Japan	Hokkaidō Prefecture — island of Hokkaidō
42°30′N 142°0′E	Pacific Ocean	
39°38′N 142°0′E	Japan	Iwate Prefecture — island of Honshū
39°24′N 142°0′E	Pacific Ocean	Passing just west of the island of Chichi-jima, Tokyo Prefecture, Japan (at 27°5′N 142°10′E); Passing just west of the island of Haha-jima, Tokyo Prefecture, Japan (at 26°42′N 142°7′E)
2°58′S 142°0′E	Papua New Guinea	
9°12′S 142°0′E	Arafura Sea	Passing just west of the Torres Strait Islands, Australia (at 10°7′S 142°5′E)
10°42′S 142°0′E	Gulf of Carpentaria	
11°46′S 142°0′E	Australia	Queensland; New South Wales — from 29°0′S 142°0′E; Victoria — from 34°7′S 142°0′E
38°18′S 142°0′E	Indian Ocean	Australian authorities consider this to be part of the Southern Ocean
38°24′S 142°0′E	Australia	Victoria — Lady Julia Percy Island
38°25′S 142°0′E	Indian Ocean	Australian authorities consider this to be part of the Southern Ocean
60°0′S 142°0′E	Southern Ocean	
66°49′S 142°0′E	Antarctica	Adélie Land, claimed by France

== See also ==
- 141st meridian east
- 143rd meridian east
