= Treaty of Zaragoza =

1529 peace treaty between Spain and Portugal

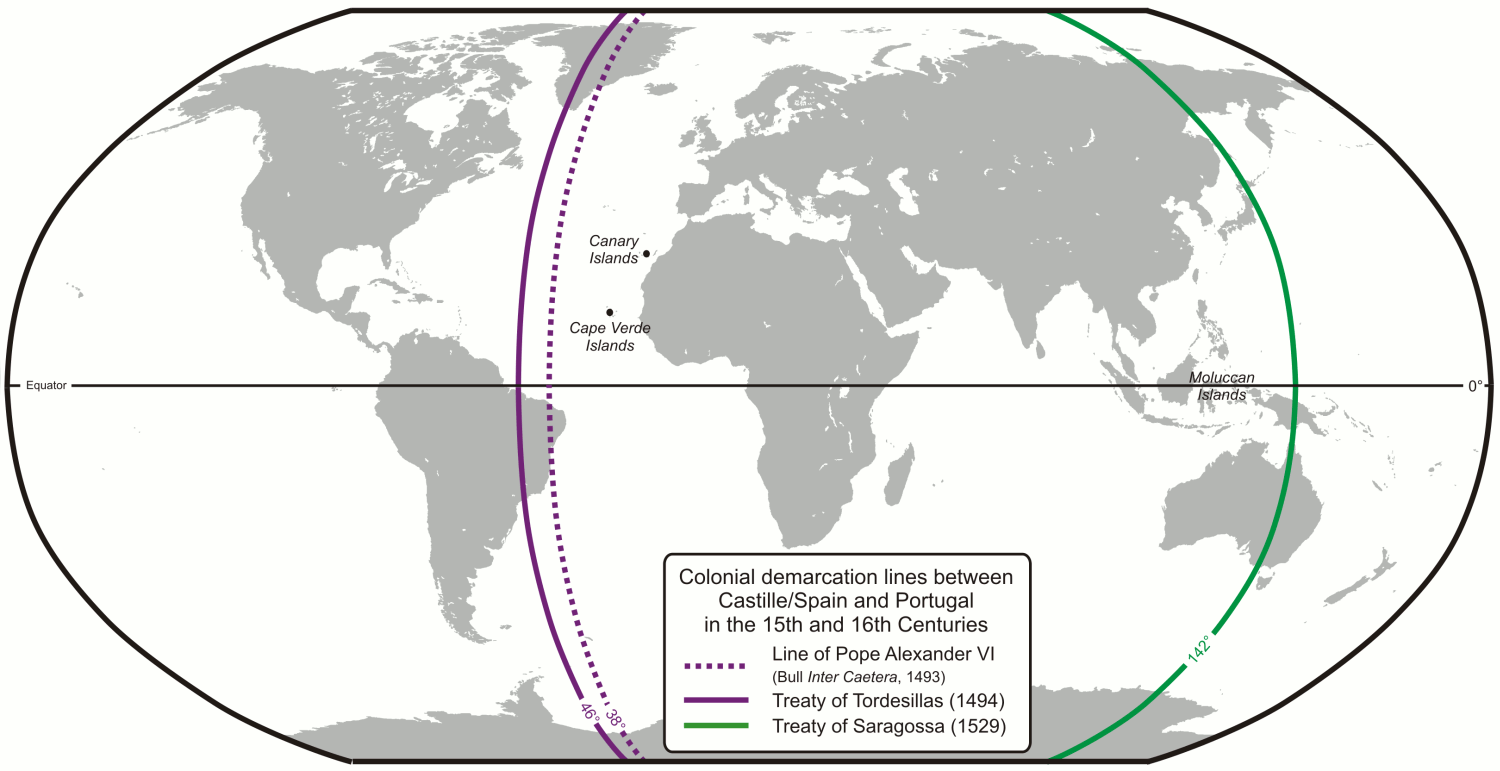
- The 1494 Tordesillas Treaty meridian (purple) and the Moluccas antimeridian (green), set by the Treaty of Zaragoza, 1529
- Signed: 22 April 1529
- Location: Zaragoza, Aragon
- Parties: Castile; Portugal

The Treaty of Zaragoza or Saragossa, also called the Capitulation of Zaragoza or Saragossa, was a peace treaty between Castile and Portugal, signed on 22 April 1529 by King John III of Portugal and the Habsburg Emperor Charles V in the Aragonese city of Zaragoza. The treaty defined the areas of Castilian and Portuguese influence in Asia in order to resolve the "Moluccas issue", which had arisen because both kingdoms claimed the lucrative Spice Islands (now Indonesia's Malukus) for themselves, asserting that they were within their area of influence as specified in 1494 by the Treaty of Tordesillas. The conflict began in 1520, when expeditions from both kingdoms reached the Pacific Ocean, because no agreed meridian of longitude had been established in the far east.

== Background ==
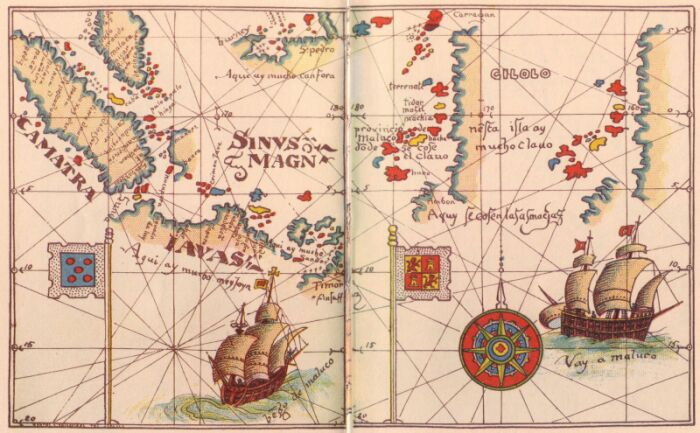
Detail of Diogo Ribeiro's 1529 edition of the Padrón Real, illustrating the Spanish claim that the Spice Islands fell within their sphere of influence, used as justification for the Spanish involvement in the Sultanate of Tidore in 1521.

In response to earlier vague bulls issued by the popes to formalize the Portuguese expansion into Africa and the Spanish claims on the Americas, Portugal and Castile signed the Treaty of Tordesillas between themselves in 1494, agreeing to respect each anothers' monopolies in the newly discovered areas. It established a meridian in the Atlantic Ocean, with areas west of the line exclusive to Spain and those east of the line exclusive to Portugal. The precise line was never established under the terms of the treaty, each side instead preferring to interpret it in the most favorable light possible.

A Portuguese expedition under Vasco da Gama discovered a sea route to India in 1498 and the India Armadas quickly overran the major southern ports, defeating Calicut at Cochin in 1504 and Gujarat and its allies at Diu in 1509. Afonso de Albuquerque conquered Malacca—central to Southeast Asian trade—in 1511. Learning the secret location of the "spice islands"—the Bandas and Ternate and Tidore in the Malukus in present-day Indonesia, then the single source of nutmeg and cloves and the main purpose for the European exploration of the Indian Ocean—Albuquerque sent an expedition there under António de Abreu. The expedition arrived in early 1512, having passed through the Lesser Sundas, Buru, Ambon, and Seram. Later, after a shipwreck-forced separation, Abreu's lieutenant Francisco Serrão sailed to the north. His ship sank off Ternate, where he obtained a license to build a Portuguese factory and fortress, the Forte de São João Baptista de Ternate.

Letters describing the Spice Islands from Serrão to Ferdinand Magellan, who was his friend and possibly a cousin, helped Magellan persuade the Spanish crown to finance the first circumnavigation of the earth. On 6 November 1521, the Moluccas—"the cradle of all spices"—were reached from the east by Magellan's fleet, now under Juan Sebastián Elcano. Before Magellan and Serrão could meet in the islands, Serrão had died on the island of Ternate, almost at the same time Magellan was killed in the Battle of Mactan in the Philippines.

After the Magellan–Elcano expedition (1519–1522), Charles V sent a second expedition under García Jofre de Loaísa to colonise the islands, based on the assertion that they were in the Castilian zone under the Treaty of Tordesillas. (Note: The expedition of García Jofre de Loaísa (1525–1526) aimed to occupy and colonise the Moluccas. The fleet of seven ships and 450 men included the most notable Spanish navigators including Juan Sebastián Elcano, who lost his life in this expedition, and the young Andrés de Urdaneta.) After some difficulties, the expedition reached the Malukus, docking at Tidore, where the Spanish established their own fort. There was an inevitable conflict with the Portuguese, who were already established in Ternate. The Spanish were initially defeated a year into the fighting but nearly a decade of skirmishes continued.

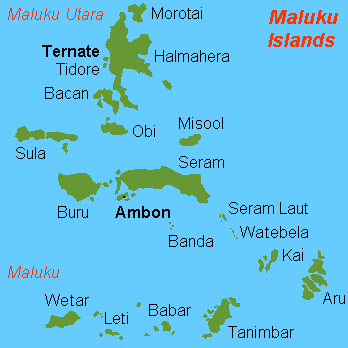
Map of the Maluku Islands, showing Ternate and Tidore

== Conference of Badajoz–Elvas ==
In 1524, both kingdoms organised the "Junta de Badajoz–Elvas" to resolve the dispute. Each crown appointed three astronomers and cartographers, three pilots and three mathematicians, who formed a committee to establish the exact location of the antimeridian of Tordesillas, and the intention was to divide the whole world into two equal hemispheres.

The Portuguese delegation sent by King João III included António de Azevedo Coutinho, Diogo Lopes de Sequeira, and Lopo Homem, a cartographer and cosmographer. The plenipotentiary from Portugal was Mercurio Gâtine, and those from Spain were Count Mercurio Gâtine, Garcia de Loaysa, Bishop of Osma, and García de Padilla, grand master of the Order of Calatrava. Former Portuguese cartographer Diogo Ribeiro, was part of the Spanish delegation. (Note: The records of the committee, held in the Portuguese national archive at Torre do Tombo, include a letter written by Lopo Homem, Portuguese cartographer and cosmographer, alluding to the quarrel between the two kingdoms over the sovereign rights of each.)

An amusing story is said to have taken place at this meeting. According to contemporary Castilian writer Peter Martyr d'Anghiera, a small boy stopped the Portuguese delegation and asked if they intended to divide up the world. The delegation answered that they were. The boy responded by baring his backside and suggesting that they draw their line through his intergluteal cleft.

The board met several times, at Badajoz and Elvas, without reaching an agreement. Geographic knowledge at that time was inadequate for an accurate assignment of longitude, and each group chose maps or globes that showed the islands to be in their own hemisphere. (Note: As an example of this partiality, the chief advisor to Charles V, Jean Carondelet, possessed a globe by Franciscus Monachus which showed the islands in the Spanish hemisphere.) John III and Charles V agreed to not send anyone else to the Moluccas until it was established in whose hemisphere they were situated.

Between 1525 and 1528 Portugal sent several expeditions to the area around Maluku Islands. Gomes de Sequeira and Diogo da Rocha were sent by the governor of Ternate Jorge de Meneses to the Celebes (also already visited by Simão de Abreu in 1523) and to the north. The expeditioners were the first Europeans to reach the Caroline Islands, which they named "Islands de Sequeira ". Explorers such as Martim Afonso de Melo (1522-24), and possibly Gomes de Sequeira (1526-1527), sighted the Aru Islands and the Tanimbar Islands. In 1526 Jorge de Meneses reached northwestern Papua New Guinea, landing in Biak in the Schouten Islands, and from there he sailed to Waigeo on the Bird's Head Peninsula.

On the other hand, in addition to the Loaísa expedition from Spain to the Moluccas (1525-1526), the Castilians sent an expedition there via the Pacific, led by Álvaro de Saavedra Cerón (1528) (prepared by Hernán Cortés in Mexico), in order to compete with the Portuguese in the region. Members of the Garcia Jofre de Loaísa expedition were taken prisoner by the Portuguese, who returned the survivors to Europe by the Western route. Álvaro de Saavedra Cerón reached the Marshall Islands, and in two failed attempts to return from Maluku Islands via the Pacific, explored part of west and northern New Guinea, also reaching the Schouten Islands and sighting Yapen, as well as the Admiralty Islands and the Carolines.

On February 10, 1525, Charles V's younger sister Catherine of Austria married John III of Portugal, and on March 11, 1526, Charles V married King John's sister Isabella of Portugal. These crossed weddings strengthened the ties between the two crowns, facilitating an agreement regarding the Moluccas. It was in the interests of the emperor to avoid conflict, so that he could focus on his European policy, and the Spaniards did not know then how to get spices from the Maluku Islands to Europe via the eastern route. The Manila-Acapulco route was only established by Andrés de Urdaneta in 1565.

== Treaty ==
The Treaty of Zaragoza laid down that the eastern border between the two domain zones was 297 1/2 leagues (1,763 kilometres, 952 nautical miles) (Note: Using the legua náutica (nautical league) of four Roman miles totalling 5.926 km, used by Spain for navigation during the 15th and 16th centuries.), or 17° east, of the Maluku Islands. (For comparison Ambon Island in the Malukus is at 128 degrees east but the group itself spreads east-west on either side of it.) This left the islands within the Portuguese domain. In exchange, the King of Portugal paid Emperor Charles V 350,000 gold ducats. The treaty included a safeguard clause which stated that the deal would be undone if at any time the emperor wished to revoke it, with the Portuguese being reimbursed the money they had to pay, and each nation "will have the right and the action as that is now." That never happened, however, because the emperor desperately needed the Portuguese money to finance the War of the League of Cognac against his archrival Francis I of France.

The treaty did not clarify or modify the line of demarcation established by the Treaty of Tordesillas, nor did it validate Spain's claim to equal hemispheres (180° each), so the two lines divided the Earth into unequal portions. Portugal's portion was roughly 191° of the Earth's circumference, whereas Spain's portion was roughly 169°. There was a ±4° margin of uncertainty as to the exact size of both portions, due to the variation of opinion about the precise location of the Tordesillas line.

Under the treaty, Portugal gained control of all lands and seas west of the line, including all of Asia and its neighbouring islands so far "discovered", leaving Spain with most of the Pacific Ocean. Although the Philippines was not mentioned in the treaty, Spain implicitly relinquished any claim to it because it was well west of the line. Nevertheless, by 1542, King Charles V had decided to colonise the Philippines, assuming that Portugal would not protest too vigorously because the archipelago had no spices. Although he failed in his attempt, King Philip II succeeded in 1565, establishing the initial Spanish trading post at Manila. As his father had expected, there was little opposition from the Portuguese.

In later times, Portuguese colonization in Brazil during the Iberian Union extended far west of the line defined in the Treaty of Tordesillas and into what would have been Spanish territory under the treaty. In 1750, new limits were drawn in the Treaty of Madrid, establishing the current limits of Brazil.

== See also ==
- 142nd meridian east
- Indonesia–Papua New Guinea relations
- South Australia–Victoria border dispute
