= Preservation Creek =

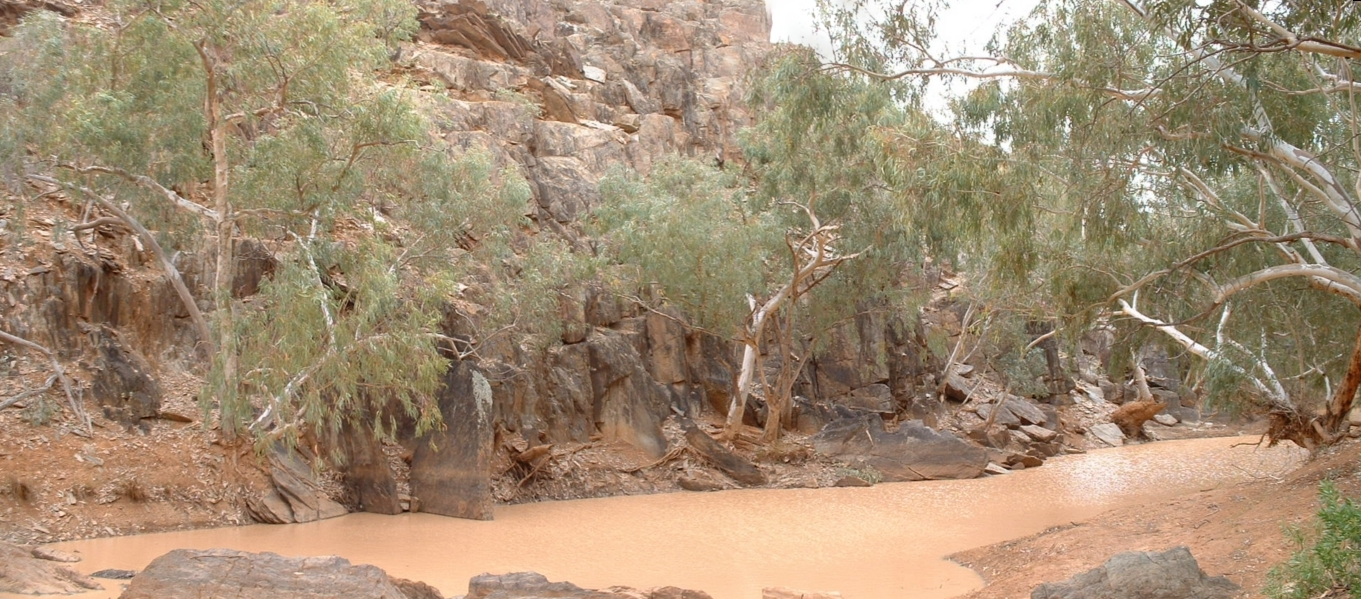
- Depot glen, Preservation Creek

Physical characteristics
- Source
  - elevation: 181 metres (594 ft)
- Mouth: Evelyn Creek
  - elevation: 162 metres (531 ft)
- Length: 8.25 km (5.13 mi)

Basin features
- Progression: Evelyn Creek → Cobham Lake

Preservation Creek is a creek in northwest New South Wales west of the town of Milparinka. The creek is 8.25 kilometres (5.13 mi) and flows from an elevation of 181 metres (594 ft) and drops to an elevation of 162 metres (531 ft). The Nuggets Creek flows into the Preservation Creek. It is a tributary of Evelyn Creek.

== History ==
Charles Sturt camped for six months at Preservation Creek and it was here that James Poole died. His grave is seen there today. Of the event Sturt wrote

"I little thought when I was engaged in the work that I was erecting Mr. Poole's monument, but so it was. That rude structure looks over his lonely grave, and will stand for ages as a record of all we suffered in the dreary region to which we were so long confined.

Sturt was expecting a vast inland sea in the inland regions and his expediting had carried boat with them. The boat was launched and abandoned at Preservation Creek when instead of a sea, they found a vast stony desert.
