= Unincorporated Far West Area =

Coordinates: 29°43′S 142°00′E

- Local government area
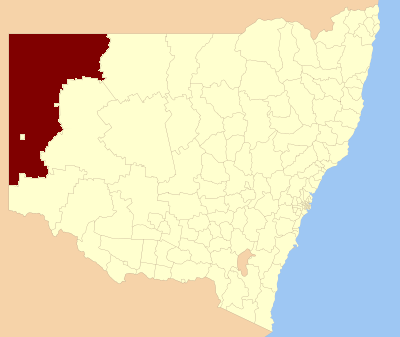
- Location in New South Wales
- Interactive map of Unincorporated Far West Area
- Country: Australia
- State: New South Wales
- Region: Far West

Government
  - State electorate: Barwon
  - Federal division: Parkes

Area
  - Total: 93,300.3 km^{2} (36,023.4 sq mi)

Population
  - Total: 571 (2021 census) (Note: Calculated from 2021 ABS Census data by subtracting the population of 445 on Lord Howe Island from the total population of 1,016 recorded in Unincorporated NSW.)
  - Density: 0.01/km^{2} (0.026/sq mi)
LGAs around Unincorporated Far West Area
South Australia	Bulloo (Qld)	Paroo (Qld)
Broken Hill	Unincorporated Far West Area	Bourke
South Australia	Wentworth	Central Darling

The Unincorporated Far West Area is an unincorporated area in the Far West region of New South Wales, Australia. The area is one of only two areas in New South Wales that are not part of any local government area (the other is Lord Howe Island). The region includes several small towns including Tibooburra, Milparinka and Silverton. Silverton and Tibooburra have non-government village committees. The region includes some parts of Broken Hill, but not the city centre, which is in the separate City of Broken Hill local government area. It is the only local government area in Australia to have two time zones.

The region has an area of 93,299 square kilometres (36,023 sq mi) which is slightly larger than Hungary and smaller than South Korea.

== Demographics ==
As at the 2016 census, all unincorporated areas of NSW had a population of 1,056; around 400 of these were on the distant and unrelated Lord Howe Island. The statistics below refer to a combination of all unincorporated areas of NSW. They had the highest male to female ratio in New South Wales, estimated at 115.5 males per 100 females in 2016.

Selected historical census data for Unincorporated NSW area
Census year		2001	2006	2011	2016	2021
Population	Estimated residents on census night	2,896	▼1,122	▲1,169	▼1,056	▼1,056
Population	LGA rank in terms of size within New South Wales			130th	▲129th	129th
Population	% of New South Wales population	0.05%	▼0.02%	0.02%	▼0.01%	0.01%
Population	% of Australian population	0.02%	▼0.006%	▼0.005%	0.005%	▼0.004%
Cultural and language diversity						
Ancestry, top responses	Australian			34.2%	▲34.7%	▲42.5%
Ancestry, top responses	English			30.0%	▼26.0%	▲38.9%
Ancestry, top responses	Scottish			8.2%	▼8.1%	▲13.6%
Ancestry, top responses	Irish			9.0%	▲9.1%	▲13.0%
Ancestry, top responses	German			5.0%	▼4.7%	▲6.6%
Language, top responses (other than English)	Finnish	n/c	n/c	n/c	n/c	▲0.7%
Language, top responses (other than English)	Spanish	n/c	n/c	n/c	n/c	▲0.7%
Language, top responses (other than English)	Portuguese	n/c	n/c	n/c	n/c	▲0.6%
Language, top responses (other than English)	Fijian	n/c	n/c	n/c	n/c	▲0.5%
Language, top responses (other than English)	Norf'k-Pitcairn	n/c	n/c	n/c	▲0.6%	▼0.5%
Religious affiliation						
Religious affiliation, top responses	No religion	17.3%	▲20.7%	▲23.4%	▲30.8%	▲43.5%
Religious affiliation, top responses	Catholic	19.6%	▲21.4%	▼21.2%	▼18.9%	▼15.9%
Religious affiliation, top responses	Anglican	22.9%	▲25.8%	▲27.4%	▼19.4%	▼15.6%
Religious affiliation, top responses	Not Stated	n/c	n/c	n/c	▲13.2%	▼9.8%
Religious affiliation, top responses	Uniting Church	7.5%	▲10.8%	▼9.2%	▼6.6%	▼4.2%
Median weekly incomes						
Personal income	Median weekly personal income		A$455	A$549	A$717	A$900
Personal income	% of Australian median income		97.6%	▼95.1%	▲108.0%	▲110.7%
Family income	Median weekly family income		A$888	A$1,145	A$1,427	A$1,927
Family income	% of Australian median income		75.8%	▲77.3%	▲82.3%	▲88.2%
Household income	Median weekly household income		A$751	A$955	A$1,270	A$1,638
Household income	% of Australian median income		73.1%	▲77.4%	▲88.3%	▲89.6%
