= Milparinka, New South Wales =

Milparinka
- Town
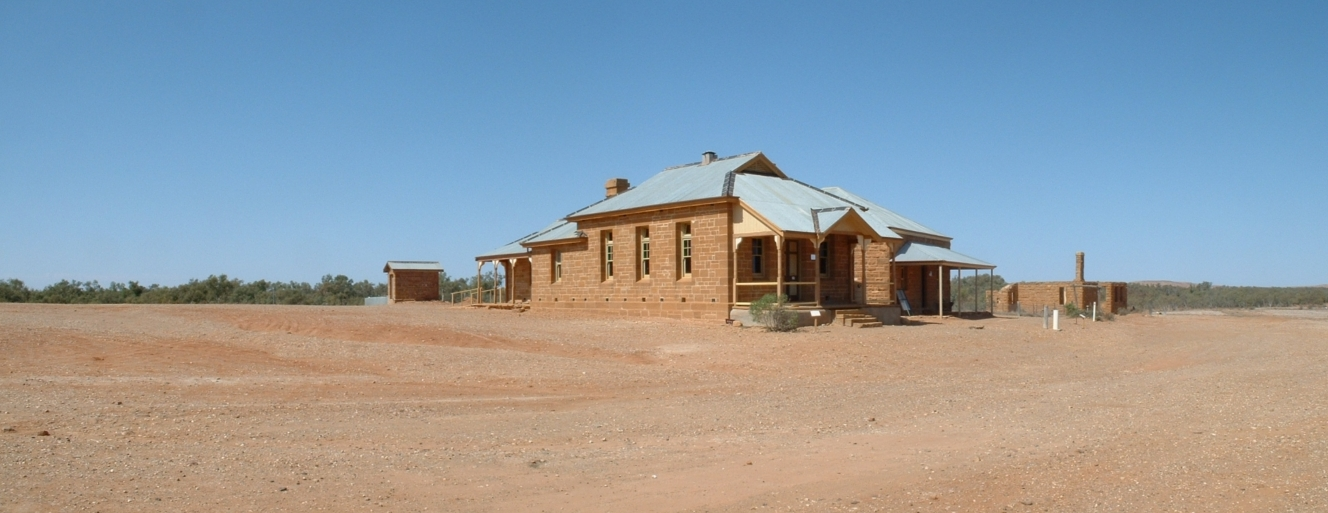
- Historic buildings at Milparinka

- Coordinates: 29.732°S 141.868°E
- Country: Australia
- State: New South Wales
- LGA: Unincorporated Far West Region
- Location: 250 km (160 mi) N of Broken Hill, New South Wales; 40 km (25 mi) S of Tibooburra, New South Wales
- Established: 1880

Government
  - State electorate: Barwon
  - Federal division: Parkes

Population
  - Total: 77 (2021 census)
- County: Evelyn
- Mean min temp: 6 °C (43 °F)

Milparinka is a small settlement in north-west New South Wales, Australia, about 250 kilometres (155 mi) north of Broken Hill on the Silver City Highway. At the time of the 2021 census, Milparinka had a population of 67 people. Milparinka is on Evelyn Creek.

Summer temperatures can reach 48 °C (118 °F).

== History ==
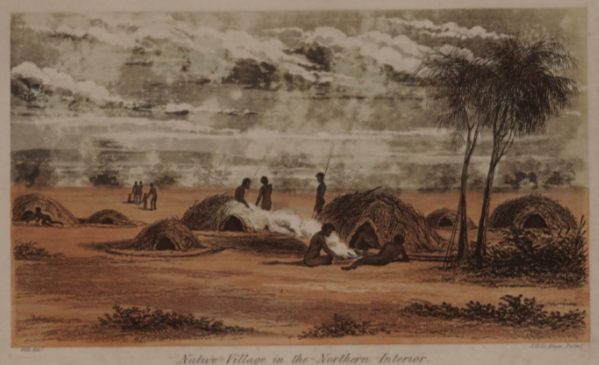
1845 painting of an Aboriginal village near Milparinka

In 1844–45, Charles Sturt's expedition was stranded for six months at nearby Depot Glen on Preservation Creek. They were trapped in an inhospitable country and his men suffered from the heat and lack of supplies. Second-in-command, James Poole, died of scurvy.

In 1880, a local Indigenous woman showed prospector James Evans gold nuggets lying on the surface of Mt Browne. Evans subsequently obtained 24 ounces of gold and a rush to the region commenced soon after. The mostly-male population of the Mt Browne goldfield at peaked at 3,000, with W.H.J. Slee being appointed the resident Goldfields Warden in January 1881. Cobb & Co coaches ran three times a week from Milparinka to Wilcannia on the Darling River (the closest settlement, as Broken Hill did not yet exist) and by August 1881 the official gold escort had carried about 10,000 ounces of gold from the field, not to mention that which went privately.

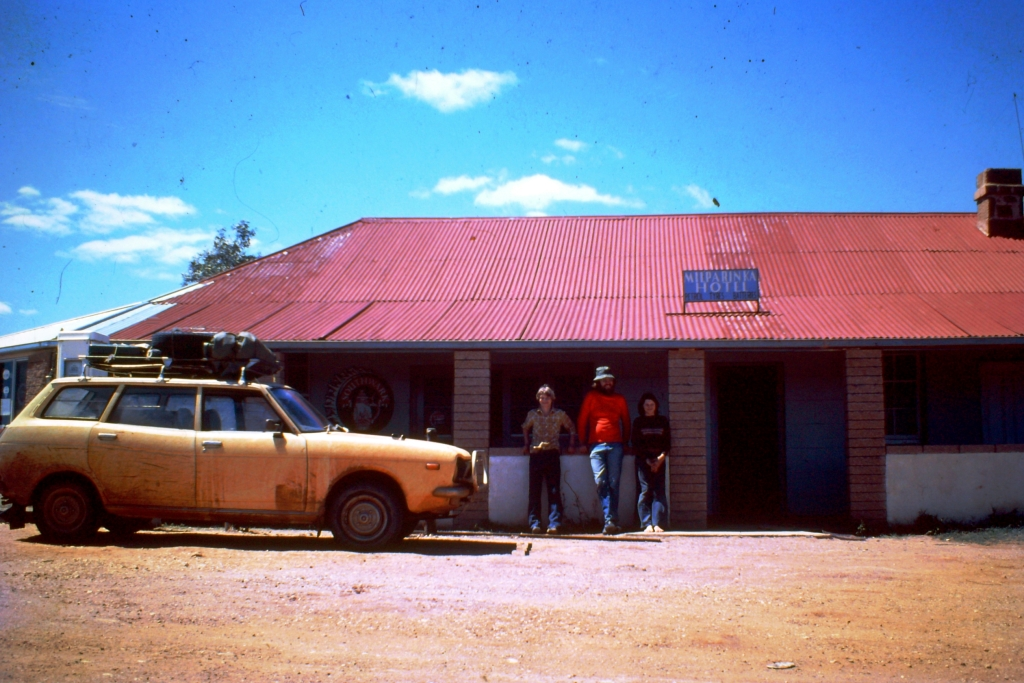
Milparinka Hotel, Milparinka, NSW 1976.

In this arid region, water was so scarce that miners collected their gold by dry blowing. Water was selling for one shilling per bucket and dysentery was rife, until in September 1881, on the recommendation of W.H.J. Slee, the New South Wales government authorised the drilling of a well. In December 1881, the government well struck water at 140 feet, which caused great relief to all.

At its height, Milparinka had a newspaper, a police office, a chemist shop, two butchers, a courthouse (1886), a school (1883), a hospital (1889) and four hotels. There was drought in 1884.

The history of the area is well documented. The Albert Hotel, named after the Albert Goldfields, has been trading almost continuously since 1880. While there have been renovations, most of the Hotel is still essentially as it was in 1880. Frederick Blore had been a builder in London before he and his family migrated to Australia, reaching Adelaide in 1852. His son George built the Albert Hotel, using sandstone cut from just outside the town of Milparinka. He bought the hotel in 1885 and did further work on its stables in 1890. He later owned Coally Station with a homestead on the banks of the Evelyn Creek.

In June 1902, a large meteorite landed at nearby Mt Browne.

Milparinka’s decline is based on two events, the failure of the gold fields to be productive and the impact of WW1 on the number of young people left in the area. Since then, Milparinka has been largely a ghost town. In 2021, 67 people were recorded as living in the census area with about 12 living permanently in the town itself. Milparinka is located in the Corner Country, a region that is sparsely populated and also includes another tiny goldfield town, Tibooburra, with a population of 95 in the local census area in 2021. Today the tiny town Milparinka has been transformed through the efforts of a community group. It has overseen the restoration of most of any heritage buildings, with the exception of the Albert Hotel, and purpose-built new centres to create a Heritage Precinct. The Milparinka Courthouse and History Centre is located in Loftus Street within the Heritage Precinct. The History Centre includes Aboriginal heritage, Sturt’s expeditions, the Kidman Story and Pioneer Women. In the pioneer women’s room there are cameo stories of the lives of pioneering women in Western NSW. These pioneer stories include that of Matilda Wallace, at Sturts Meadows Station, who was one of the earliest female pastoralists in the area West of the Darling. The room features a painting of Matilda and child by the award-winning Broken Hill artist, Jodi Daly. Her story is but one of the many women who played a role in the development of Western NSW. The role of women in settler literature of the region has often downplayed the role of these women.

The Sturt’s Steps Touring Route was originally designed by the Milparinka Heritage and Tourism Association in 2008 to retrace the path taken by Charles Sturt when his Inland Expedition came into the Corner Country in 1845. The route connects about 1100 kilometre of sealed and unsealed roads from Broken Hill to Milparinka, Tibooburra and Cameron Corner to create a circular touring loop. Ruth Sandow, OAM, was founder of the Milparinka Heritage and Tourism Association and instrumental in the formation of the Sturt Steps infrastructure project. Signage along this route tells the story of Indigenous life before Sturt's expedition, and pastoral and mining life. Features along the route include a metal silhouette of Matilda, a wire sculpture of Charles Sturt and his horse, the Milparinka town sign, Sturt’s refuges at Depot Glen, Lake Pinnaroo and Fort Grey, a replica of Sturt’s whale boat, and Sturt’s Cairn on top of Mount Poole.

The Aboriginal history of Milparinka, New South Wales, is connected to the Malyangapa people and their use of Evelyn Creek. The name "Milparinka" is believed to be an Aboriginal word that means "water may be found here". The Milparinka Heritage Precinct Malyangapa Cultural Heritage Room is located in the Courthouse. A fundamental understanding of the land and environment helped Aboriginal tribes to survive, especially their ability to find and conserve water. Many Europeans, both explorers and early settlers, could not have survived without the help of the Aboriginal people. In her memoir, Matilda Wallace recalled that local Aboriginal people often travelled with them, scouting ahead for water and helping to shepherd the sheep and that a permanent well was eventually sunk on the creek near their original camp, sited with the help of local Aboriginal people.

Milparinka has been transformed into an award-winning Heritage Town with restored colonial buildings, a Visitor Information Centre, a variety of attractions, a caravan park and an historic hotel. The town’s future now depends on tourism.

== Heritage listings ==
The ruins of the Albert Goldfield are listed on the New South Wales State Heritage Register.
