= Yarli language =

Australian Aboriginal language

Yarli
- Region: Northwestern New South Wales
- Ethnicity: Malyangapa, Yardliyawara, Wadikali, Karenggapa
- Native speakers: possibly extinct; 2 speakers in 1987 (2004); Malyangapa extinct 1976 with the death of Laurie Quayle; Wadikali extinct before that
- Language family: Pama–Nyungan: Yarli
- Dialects: Malyangapa; Yardliyawarra
- Writing system: Latin

Language codes
- ISO 639-3: Variously: yxl – Yardliyawarra yga – Malyangapa wdk – Wadikali (Malyangapa dialect)
- Glottolog: yarl1236
- AIATSIS: L8 Malyangapa, L7 Yardliyawara
- Yardli languages (green) among other Pama–Nyungan (tan)

Yarli (Yardli) was a dialect cluster of Australian Aboriginal languages spoken in northwestern New South Wales and into Northeastern South Australia individually Malyangapa (Maljangapa), Yardliyawara, and Wadikali (Wardikali, Wadigali). Bowern (2002) notes Karenggapa as part of the area, but there is little data.

Tindale (1940) groups Wanjiwalku & Karenggapa together with Wadikali & Maljangapa as the only languages in NSW that are behind the 'Rite of Circumcision' border - which suggests Wanjiwalku to also be part of the Yarli area.

== Classification ==
The three varieties are very close. Hercus & Austin (2004) classify them as the Yarli branch of the Pama–Nyungan family. Dixon (2002) regards the three as dialects of a single language. Bowern (2002) excludes them from the Karnic languages, where they had sometimes been classified.

== Phonology ==
The following are the sounds in the Malyangapa dialect:

=== Consonants ===
Malyangapa consonants
	Peripheral		Laminal		Apical	
	Labial	Velar	Dental	Palatal	Alveolar	Retroflex
Plosive	p	k	t̪	c	t	ʈ
Nasal	m	ŋ	n̪	ɲ	n	ɳ
Lateral				ʎ	l	ɭ
Rhotic					r	
Approximant	w			j		ɻ

=== Vowels ===
Malyangapa vowels
	Front	Central	Back
High	i iː		u uː
Low		a aː	
