= Silver City Highway =

Highway in New South Wales, Australia

Silver City Highway New South Wales
- Map of the far west of New South Wales, with Silver City Highway highlighted in red

General information
- Type: Highway
- Length: 683 km (424 mi)
- Gazetted: August 1928 (as Main Road 69); January 1945 (as State Highway 22)
- Route number(s): B79 (2022–present) (Buronga–Warri Gate) B79 (2013–present) (Buronga–Broken Hill)
- Former route number: National Route 79 (1955–2013) (Curlwaa–Broken Hill)

Major junctions
- South end: Sturt Highway; Buronga, New South Wales
- Calder Highway; Barrier Highway
- North end: Warry Gate Road; NSW/QLD border

Location(s)
- Major settlements: Buronga, Dareton, Wentworth, Broken Hill

Restrictions
- General: Limited fuel and supplies available, especially outside of settlements.

Highway system
- Highways in Australia; National Highway • Freeways in Australia; Highways in New South Wales

Silver City Highway is a 683-kilometre-long (424 mi) highway that links Buronga, New South Wales to the Queensland border via Wentworth, Broken Hill, and Tibooburra, in the arid Far West region of New South Wales; a short branch also connects to Calder Highway on the Victorian border at Curlwaa (signed as Calder Highway). The namesake of the highway is derived from the moniker for Broken Hill – the "Silver City" – which the highway travels through. The highway is designated route B79 from Buronga to the Queensland border at Warri Gate since the completion of the highway's sealing in December 2022.

== Route ==
The route passes through largely arid terrain, although there are multiple irrigated areas between Buronga and Wentworth in the highway's south. There is relatively flat terrain between Wentworth and Broken Hill that forms arid pastures for grazing. Around Broken Hill and a little to the north the Barrier Range is encountered, which is more hilly than the rest of the route encountered so far, but not mountainous. North of there the country is once again relatively flat, though there are further hills around Milparinka. Near Tibooburra the terrain becomes a stony desert; this kind of terrain is known in Australia as gibber.

Creeks to the north of Broken Hill are generally crossed straight across the riverbed, whether the road has been sealed or not. There is signage to help drivers gauge depth of the waters if there does happen to be flows after rains. The highway also roughly follows the route Charles Sturt took when he explored the area, during his search to find the fabled inland sea.

=== Along the Murray River ===
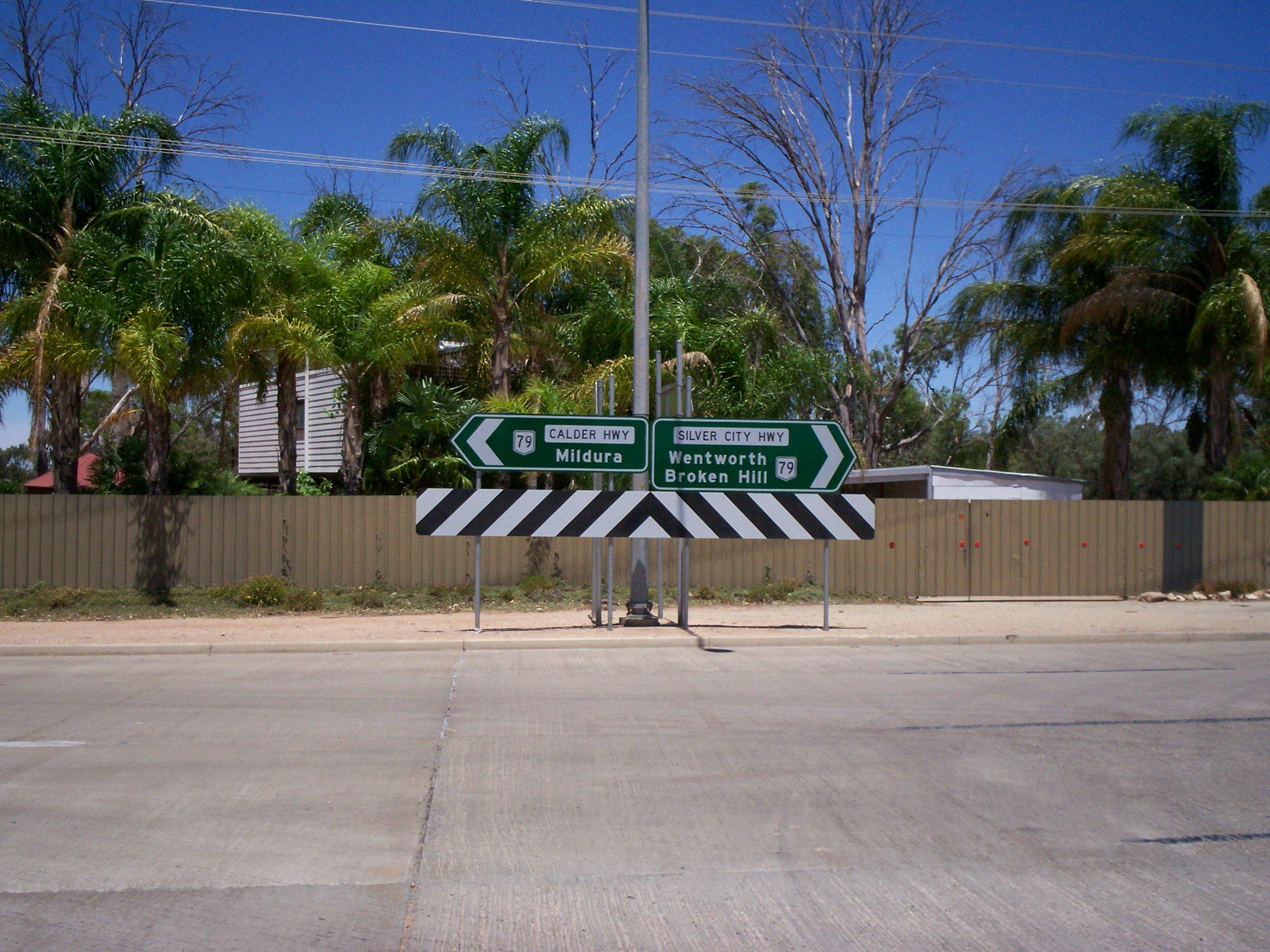
Calder Highway (branch) intersection, from the north. (This sign has since been changed with B79 but Calder Highway unsassigned to the VIC border)

The highway begins at its intersection with Sturt Highway in the town of Buronga in the far south-west of New South Wales. Buronga is located immediately across the Murray River from the city of Mildura in Victoria. From here the highway heads northwesterly through a pocket of farmland at the locality of Mourquong, before turning on a more westerly heading. The road then traverses arid savanna before again reaching the farmland surrounding Dareton. The road takes on the name Tapio Street within the urban area. Continuing west the enters into more farmland at Curlwaa. Here the road comes to a T-intersection where a turn to the west is required to stay on Silver City Highway. The road to the east is also gazetted as a spur of the highway and is signed as Calder Highway, to which it connects a short distance away across the single lane Abbotsford Bridge over the Murray River. Continuing west on the highway, the farmland largely continues the entirety of the short distance to Wentworth. Upon entering Wentworth, the road takes on several names within the town's urban area. Firstly it takes on the name Wentworth Street, before turning west at the Sandwych Street intersection and using that name. The highway then crosses the Darling River over a lift-span bridge. At Adams Street the highway then turns north, keeping the name until it leaves the urban area.

=== Wentworth to Broken Hill ===
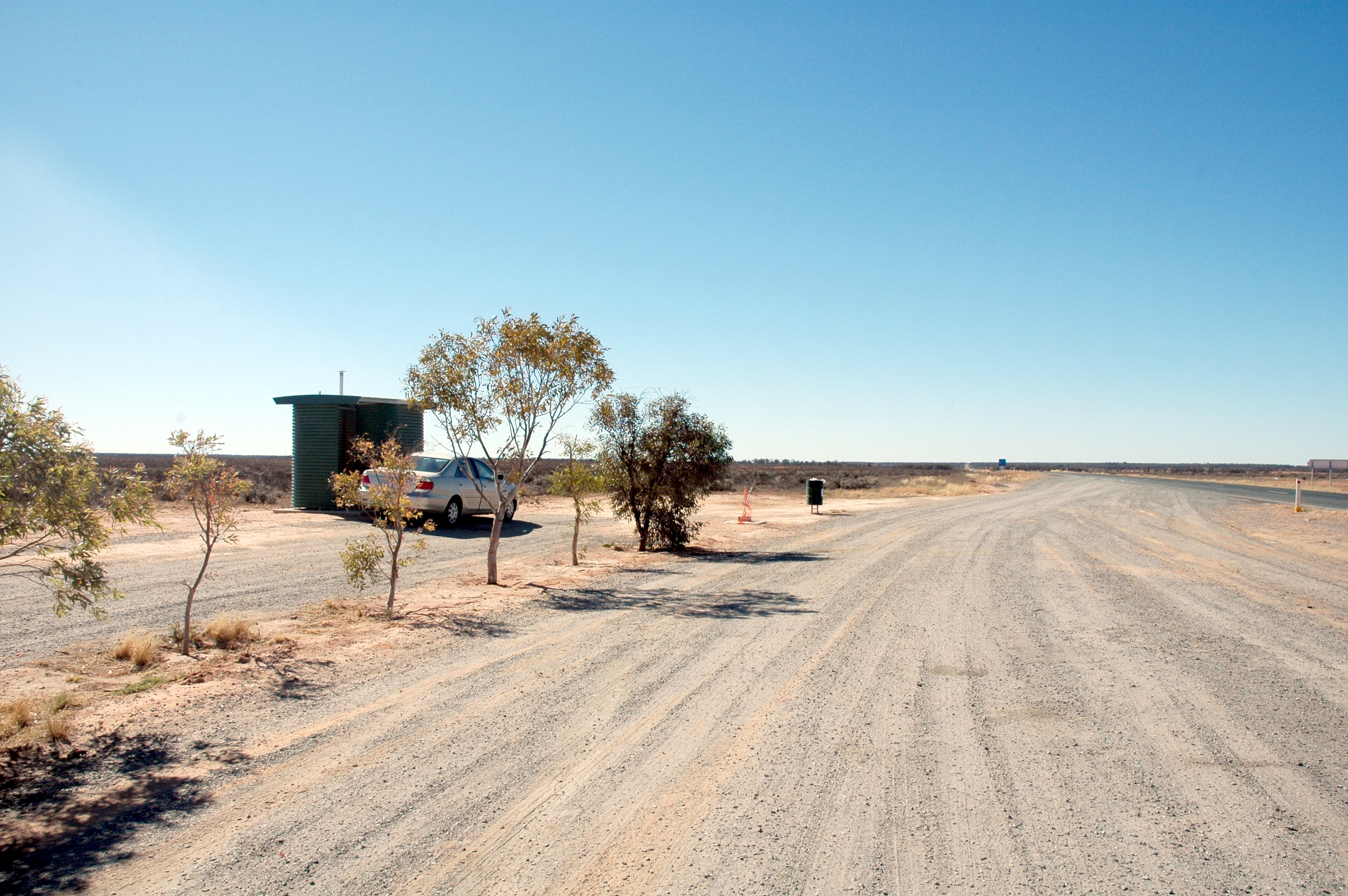
Terrain as seen from a rest area north of Wentworth

Heading north out of Wentworth, the highway enters arid scrublands and it swings northwest towards the Great Darling Anabranch. Once it reaches the normally dry river, it follows the anabranch upstream crossing it at Bunnerungee Bridge. The highway continues to follow the anabranch north, passing nearby several normally dry lakes, including along the shoreline of Popitah Lake. Roughly following the creekbed of Coombah Creek northwards a short distance, the highway then enters the depression of Coombah Lake. The roadway crosses the lakebed atop an embankment. From here the highway re-enters the lakebed and continues along it to its northern extent. To the north of Coombah lake the road passes to the west of similarly dry Kudgee Lake, the roadway then follows the western side of the Pine Creek creekbed crossing it after some distance, then following it along the eastern side much of the remainder of the way Broken Hill. Upon reaching the approaches to Broken Hill, the terrain elevation becomes a little more varied from the very flat journey travelled so far, as this area is part of the Barrier Range. There is no fuel available along this stretch since the Coombah roadhouse permanently closed.

=== Within Broken Hill ===
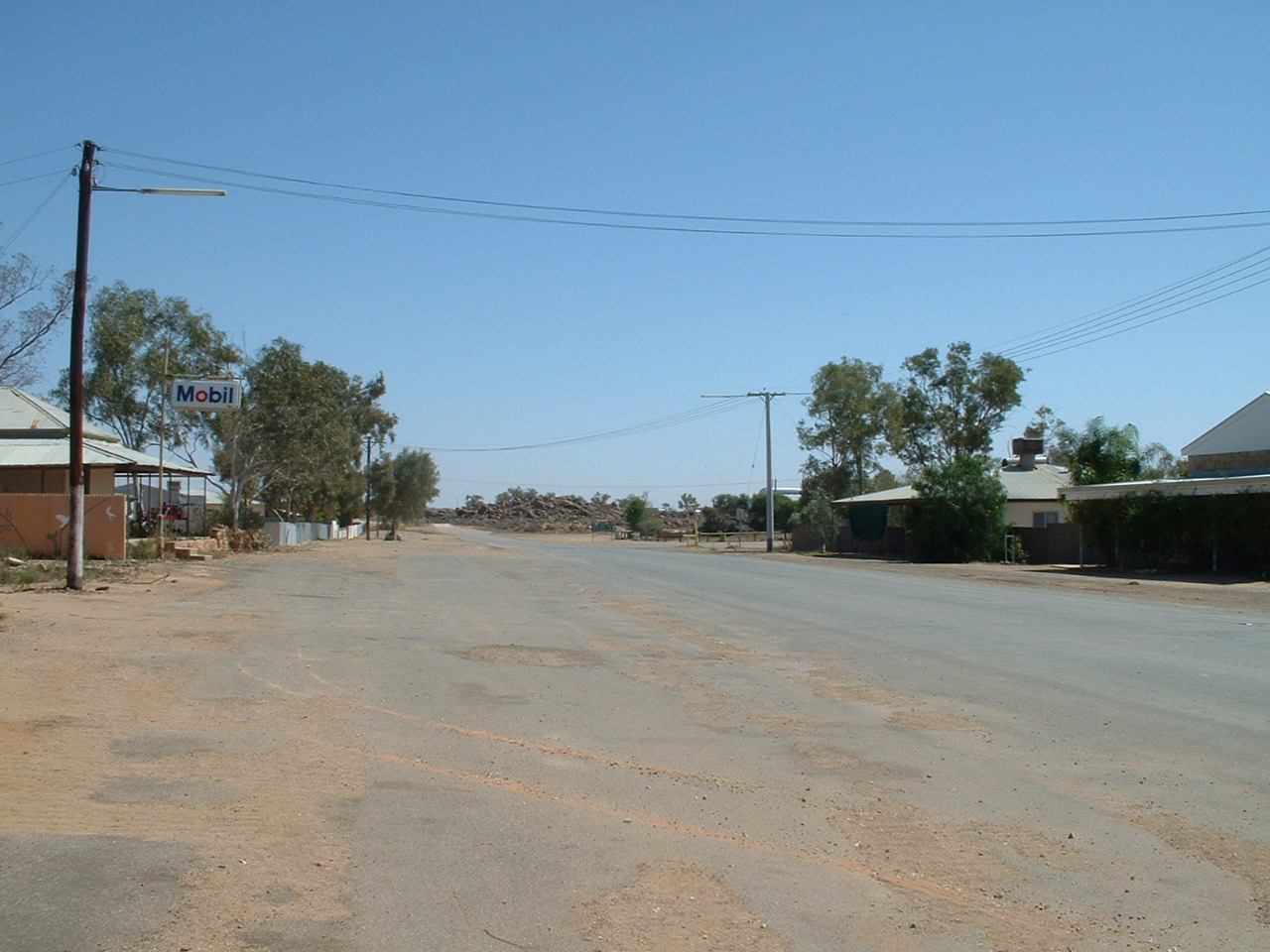
Silver City Highway in Tibooburra, looking north

On the southern outskirts of Broken Hill, the highway passes Kanandah Road, which forms part of the heavy vehicle bypass. North of Kanandah Road, the highway takes on the name Wentworth Road for a short distance while it curves eastwards. Once it reaches South Broken Hill urban area, the road continues as Patton Street until reach the roundabout at Bonanza Street where it then turns northwards. It passes over a hill between two mines and becomes South Road northward of Gypsum Street. Upon reaching Broken Hill itself; it becomes Crystal Street, and then turns north at Iodide Street. North of Argent Street, Barrier Highway also follows the same route for a few blocks until it leaves westwards at Williams Street. At the same intersection, Silver City Highway heads eastwards. The highway continues east almost all the way until the edge of the city, where it turns north at Buck Street. It takes on that name for a short distance until it leaves the urban area.

=== Broken Hill to the Dingo Fence ===
The highway continues a long distance northwards, through very dry country and crossing the occasional creekbed. Eventually it reaches Packsaddle Roadhouse, where fuel and supplies can be purchased; roughly halfway between Broken Hill and the Queensland border. North of Packsaddle the highway continues in the same fashion, although it does pass between some salt lakes. Eventually it reaches the Milparinka area, where the former township can be accessed a short distance off the highway. Further to the north the highway reaches Tibooburra, the only sizable settlement along the route north of Broken Hill. North of Tibooburra it passes through Sturt National Park before reaching its terminus at the Queensland border along the Dingo Fence, at Warri Gate.

== History ==
The passing of the Main Roads Act of 1924 through the Parliament of New South Wales provided for the declaration of Main Roads, roads partially funded by the State government through the Main Roads Board (MRB). Main Road No. 69 was declared along this road on 8 August 1928, from Wentworth via Broken Hill, Milparinka and Tibooburra to the state border with Queensland; with the passing of the Main Roads (Amendment) Act of 1929 to provide for additional declarations of State Highways and Trunk Roads, this was amended to Trunk Road 69 on 8 April 1929.

The Department of Main Roads, which had succeeded the New South Wales MRB in 1932, declared State Highway 21 on 16 March 1938, from Cobham Lake via Milparkinka and Tibooburra to the state border with Queensland at Olive Downs (and continuing south via White Cliffs, Wilcannia, Booligal, Hay and Deniliquin to the state border with Victoria at Moama); Trunk Road 69 was truncated to meet State Highway 21 as a result. State Highway 22 was later declared on 24 January 1945, from the intersection with Sturt Highway at Buronga via Wentworth, Broken Hill, Cobham Lake, Milparkinka and Tibooburra to the state border with Queensland at Olive Downs, subsuming Trunk Road 69; the northern end of State Highway 21 was truncated to meet Barrier Highway south of Wilcannia and its former alignment north of Wilcannia was declared as Main Road 435, meeting State Highway 22 at Kayrunnera, as a result.

State Highway 22 was named Silver City Highway on 3 August 1960, with a branch to Abbotsford Bridge over the Murray River at Curlwaa also declared, to meet Calder Highway in Victoria; while this branch is signed Calder Highway, it is officially part of Silver City Highway. The name was decided upon as the road's main purpose is to link Broken Hill (the Silver City) to areas north and south of the city. The Broken Hill ore deposit contains a vast amount of silver, lead, and zinc. At one stage the name "Four States Highway" was also considered, as the road connects to Queensland and Victoria at each end, and also to South Australia via Barrier Highway from Broken Hill.

The passing of the Roads Act 1993 through the Parliament of New South Wales updated road classifications and the way they could be declared within New South Wales. Under this Act, Silver City Highway today retains its declaration as Highway 22, from the intersection with Sturt Highway at Buronga via Wentworth, Broken Hill, Cobham Lake and Tibooburra to the state border with Queensland at Warri Gate, with a branch to Abbotsford Bridge over the Murray River at Curlwaa.

Silver City Highway was signed National Route 79 between Broken Hill and Curlwaa, and the branch to Curlwaa to Abbotsford Bridge and Calder Highway, in 1955. With the conversion to the newer alphanumeric system in 2013, this was replaced with route B79 between Broken Hill and Buronga; the branch from Curlwaa to Abbotsford Bridge is now unallocated, despite route A79 continuing along Calder Highway in Victoria. The highway north of Broken Hill also remains unallocated.

=== Sealing ===
The Wentworth to Broken Hill section was sealed in 1969.

Work began in 2011 to seal the remaining 150 km of unsealed highway. In June 2018, the NSW Government announced it was investing $145 million to seal the remaining 209 km of the Cobb and Silver City Highways by 2023. By July 2020 the highway was sealed as far as Tibooburra, and by December 2022, the entire length to the Queensland border was sealed.

== Junctions ==
State	LGA	Location	km	mi	Destinations	Notes
New South Wales	Wentworth	Buronga	0.0	0.0	Sturt Highway (A20) – Euston, Balranald, Mildura	Southern terminus of highway and route B79 at roundabout
New South Wales	Wentworth	Mourquong	2.4	1.5	Arumpo Road – Willandra Lakes World Heritage Area, Mungo National Park	
New South Wales	Wentworth	Curlwaa	23.7	14.7	Calder Highway (A79) – Merbein, Mildura	T-intersection, route A79 continues along Calder Highway south of NSW/VIC border
New South Wales	Wentworth	Wentworth	29.9	18.6	Wentworth Street (Pooncarrie Road) (north) – Pooncarie, Menindee; Armstrong Avenue (east), to Old Wentworth Road – Dareton	Four-way intersection
New South Wales	Darling River		30.1	18.7	Bridge over the river (Bridge name unknown)	
New South Wales	Wentworth	Wentworth	30.4	18.9	Sandwych Street (west) – Wentworth; Adams Street (south) – Wentworth	Four-way intersection
New South Wales	Wentworth	Wentworth	32.4	20.1	Renmark Road – Renmark, Wentworth Airstrip	
New South Wales	Great Darling Anabranch		97.7	60.7	Bunnerungee Bridge	
New South Wales	Coombah Lake		169.8	105.5	Raised embankment over the lake	
New South Wales	Broken Hill	Broken Hill	290	180	Kanandah Road – Silverton	Heavy vehicle bypass to Barrier Highway
New South Wales	Broken Hill	Broken Hill	293	182	Patton Street (northeast) – Broken Hill South; Bonanza Street (southeast) – Broken Hill Airport	Roundabout
New South Wales	Broken Hill	Broken Hill	294	183	Gypsum Street – Railwaytown, Silverton	
New South Wales	Broken Hill	Broken Hill	296	184	Iodide Street (south) – Broken Hill; Crystal Street (east) – Broken Hill	Four-way intersection
New South Wales	Broken Hill	Broken Hill	297	185	Argent Street (A32 east, unallocated west) – Wilcannia, Nyngan, Dubbo	Four-way intersection; southern terminus of concurrency with route A32, northern terminus of route B79
New South Wales	Broken Hill	Broken Hill	298	185	Williams Street (A32 west) – Silverton, Adelaide, Broken Hill Hospital; Iodide Street (north) - Broken Hill	Four-way intersection: northern terminus of concurrency with route A32
New South Wales	Unincorporated	Fowlers Gap	351	218	Mutawintji Road – White Cliffs	
New South Wales	Unincorporated	Packsaddle	517	321	Henry Roberts Road – Packsaddle, White Cliffs	
New South Wales	Unincorporated	Tibooburra	628	390	Brown Street, to Tibooburra Road – Wanaaring, Bourke	
New South Wales	Unincorporated	Tibooburra	675	419	Jump Up Loop Road – Cameron Corner	Surface change from asphalt to gravel
New South Wales	Unincorporated	Tibooburra	683	424	Warri Gate on the Dingo Fence	Northern terminus of highway
State border			683	424	New South Wales – Queensland state border	
Queensland	Bulloo	Cameron Corner	683	424	Warri Gate Road – Noccundra, Thargomindah	Southern terminus of Warri Gate Road
1.000 mi = 1.609 km; 1.000 km = 0.621 mi: Concurrency terminus; Route transition; Listing includes: terminuses, declared roads, and intersections where a turn is required to remain on the highway.

== See also ==
- Highways in Australia
- List of highways in New South Wales
