= Sturt National Park =

Australian national park

- IUCN category II (national park)
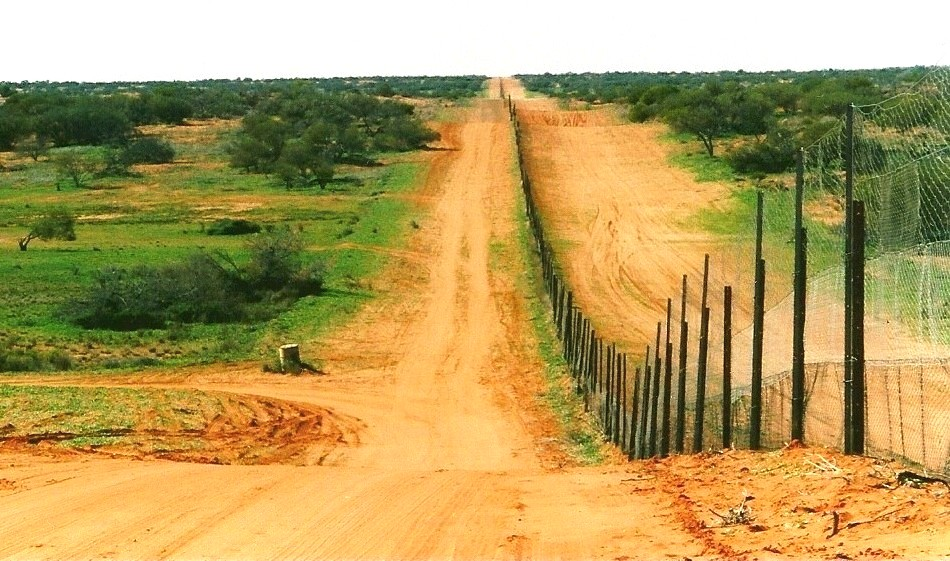
- The Dingo Fence in Cameron Corner, located on the northern boundary of the national park

- Location within New South Wales
- Location: New South Wales
- Nearest city: Tibooburra
- Coordinates: 29°05′37″S 141°30′31″E
- Area: 3,253.29 km^{2} (1,256.10 sq mi)
- Established: 25 February 1972
- Governing body: NSW National Parks & Wildlife Service
- Website: Official website

The Sturt National Park is a protected national park in the arid far north-western corner of New South Wales, in eastern Australia. The 325,329-hectare (803,910-acre) national park is situated approximately 1,060 kilometres (660 mi) northwest of Sydney and the nearest town is Tibooburra, 6 kilometres (3.7 mi) away.

Established in 1972, the park is named in honour of Charles Sturt, a colonial explorer. The park features typical outback scenery of flat, reddish-brown landscapes. It was resumed from five pastoral properties. The Sturt National Park was featured in British documentary called Planet Earth. The Dingo Fence was built along the national park's northern boundary.

== Flora ==
Flora consists mostly of mulga bushland and arid shrubland, particularly Saltbush. After good rain the harsh landscape is transformed by the growth of wildflowers including Sturt's desert pea.

== Fauna ==
=== Mammals ===
At least 31 species of mammal have been recorded in the park. The most obvious to visitors include the red kangaroo, western grey kangaroo, eastern grey kangaroo and Euro. Other terrestrial mammals found at Sturt NP also include the dingo, stripe-faced dunnart, paucident planigale, narrow-nosed planigale, dusky hopping mouse and desert mouse. Nine species of bat have also been recorded in the park, including the eastern long-eared bat, little broad-nosed bat, yellow-bellied sheath-tailed bat, inland forest bat and little pied bat. Several introduced pest species occur, including the European fox, European rabbit, feral cat, feral goat and feral pig.

Several mammal species that previously occurred prior to the arrival of Europeans are also being reintroduced into the park. These include the Crest-tailed Mulgara, Greater Bilby, Western barred bandicoot, Burrowing bettong, Greater stick-nest rat, Golden bandicoot and Western quoll.

=== Reptiles and amphibians ===
At least 67 species of reptile have been recorded in the park. Commonly found species include the central bearded dragon, shingleback, tree dtella and Bynoe's gecko. The Gould's goanna, ringed brown snake, whip snake and mulga snake are also common, but less likely to be seen. Several cryptic species also inhabit the park, such as the Interior blind snake and woma python.

Several frog species can also be found in the park, including the desert tree frog, common around the residential and accommodation areas, the burrowing frog and the water-holding frog.

=== Birds ===
At least 197 bird species have been recorded in the park, with the most obvious to visitors being the emu. Significant ground-nesting birds include the inland dotterel, stubble quail, Australian pratincole and spotted nightjar. 13 species of parrot, which rely on tree hollows for nesting, have also been recorded in the park. These include flocks of cockatiels, galahs, corellas and less frequently budgerigars that appear after rain events. A wide variety of birds of prey are also present in the park, including the wedge-tailed eagle, black-breasted buzzard, grey falcon, Australian hobby and nankeen kestrel.

The Ramsar-listed Lake Pinaroo, present within the park, also acts as an important stopover and drought refuge for at least 40 species of waterbird, including several threatened species, such as the Australian painted-snipe. Other waterbird species also include the freckled duck, blue-billed duck and Caspian tern.

=== Invertebrates ===
Ants, termites, native bees and spiders are all common within the park, however existing knowledge of species and interactions are poor. The aquatic invertebrates found in the park include the common yabby and freshwater crab, while populations of shield shrimp can commonly be found in temporary water pools after rain events.

== Attractions ==
The park contains aboriginal middens and stone relics. There are many walking trails and an extensive network of roads. Most roads in the park are gravel with some sandy stretches and can be driven on with a conventional vehicle. A 4WD vehicle is needed after heavy rains.

In the east of the park are flood plains, dotted with occasional trees which then give way to small rocky gorges and creek beds. Located here is Mount Wood, Gorge Lookout and the Mount Wood camping ground.

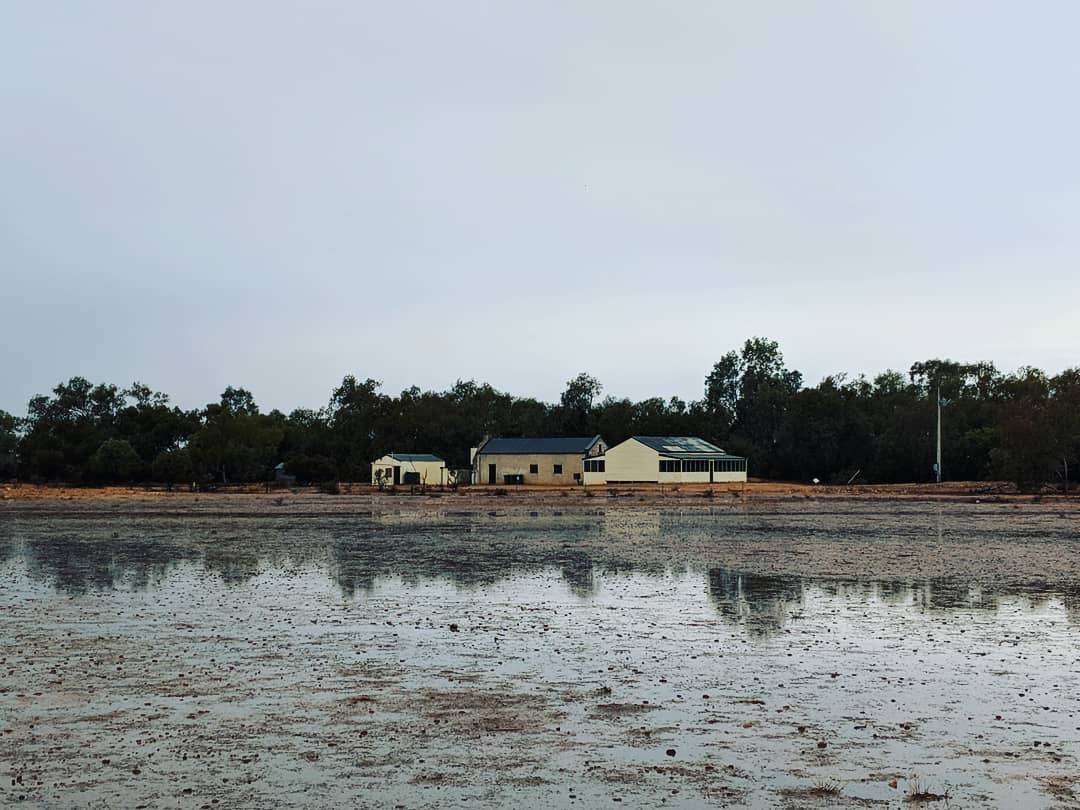
The Mt. Wood shearers quarters after 10mm of rain

Towards the middle of the park, The Olive Downs, or "Jump Up" country has flat topped mesas rising up to 150 metres (490 ft) above the surrounding plains, granite outcrops and flat valleys. The Jump Ups are the remains of an ancient mountain range. The park's second camping site called Dead Horse Gully camping ground is located here. Amongst the boulders north of Tibooburra is another camping ground. All camp grounds have toilets, gas barbecues and water provided.

In the far west of the national park, the gibber plains are replaced by sandhills of the Strzelecki Desert. Cameron Corner is a remote but popular tourist destination where the states of New South Wales, South Australia and Queensland meet. Also in this part of the park is Fort Grey—the fourth camp ground and a heritage site. The holding yards visible here and a remnant from the explorer Charles Sturt. The fort is a stockade that was built to protect Sturt's supplies and prevent the exploration party's sheep from wandering away. While searching for a fabled inland sea, Captain Charles Sturt, after whom the park is named, spent a year in the area. Fort Grey is sited on the edge of the ephemeral, and Ramsar-listed, Lake Pinaroo - an important breeding and drought refuge for waterbirds when it contains water.

== Heritage listings ==
The Mount Wood Station is a heritage-listed former cattle station in the national park.

== Conservation projects ==
=== Wild Deserts program ===
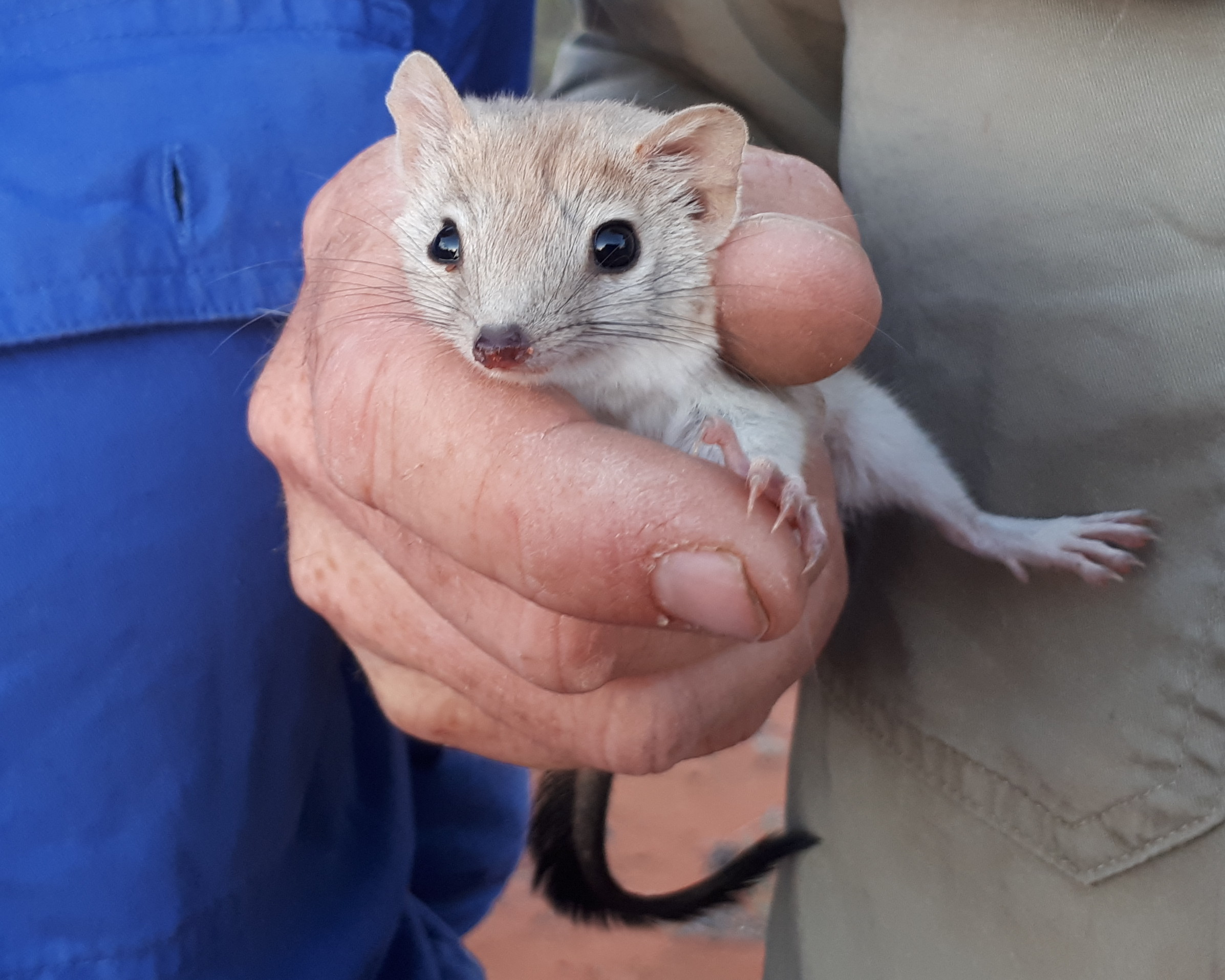
A Crest-tailed Mulgara, re-discovered in Sturt NP in 2017 during wildlife surveys undertaken as part of the Wild Deserts program

The Wild Deserts program is an ongoing program aiming to reintroduce 7 locally extinct mammals back into Sturt National Park. A partnership between the University of New South Wales and Ecological Horizons, in collaboration with the Office of Environment and Heritage and Taronga Conservation Society, the project is using large fenced exclosures to assist with the reintroduction. The species being reintroduced include the crest-tailed mulgara, greater bilby, western barred bandicoot, burrowing bettong, greater stick-nest rat, golden bandicoot and western quoll.

== See also ==
- Protected areas of New South Wales
- Mount Wood Station
