= Channel Country =

Bioregion in Australia

Coordinates: 25°59′47.04″S 140°59′57.52″E

- Region
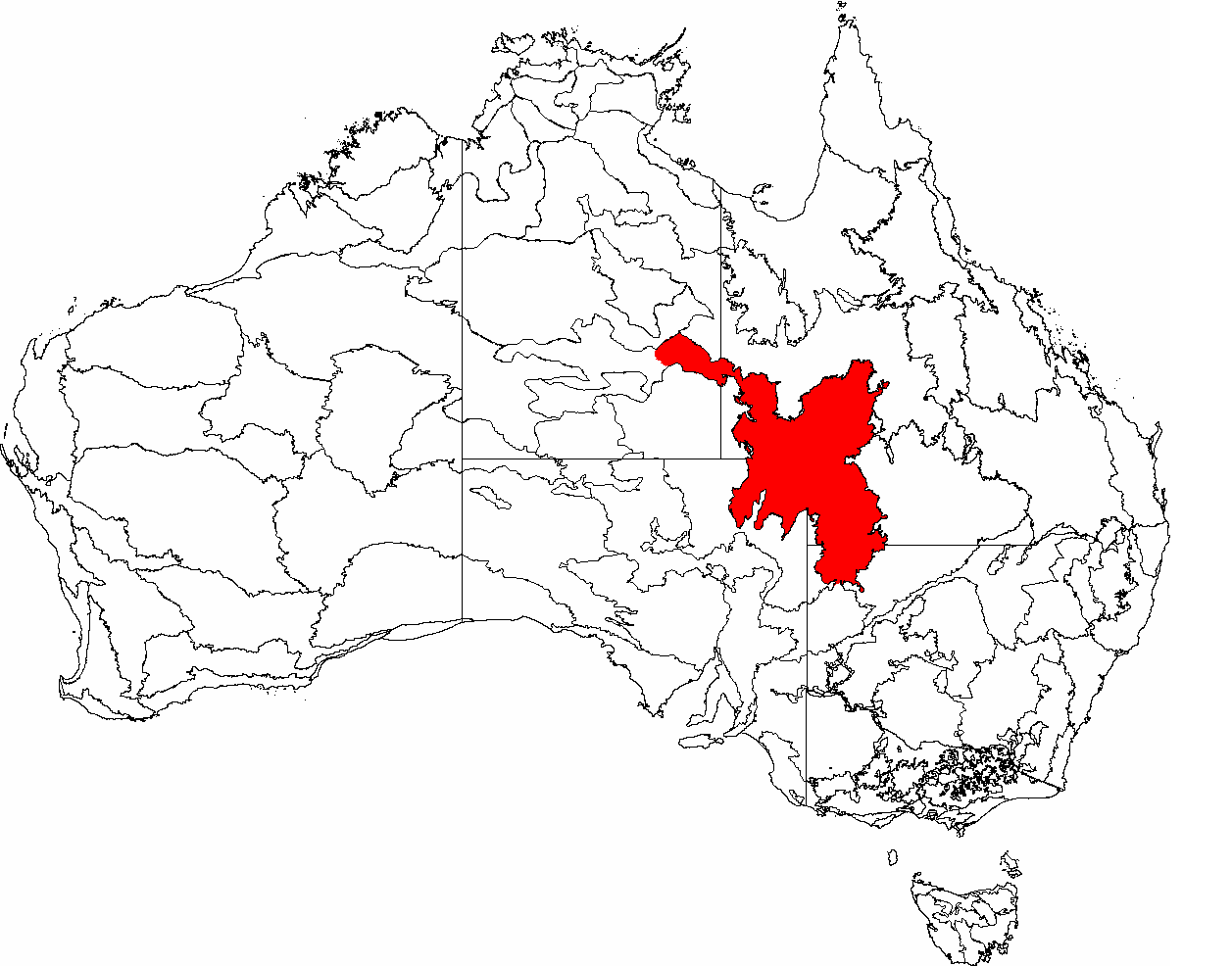
- The interim Australian bioregions, with Channel Country in red
- Country: Australia
- State: Australia

Area
  - Total: 304,094.37 km^{2} (117,411.49 sq mi)
Regions around Channel Country
Tanami	Mitchell Grass Downs	Mitchell Grass Downs
Simpson Strzelecki Dunefields	Channel Country	Mulga Lands
Simpson Strzelecki Dunefields	Broken Hill Complex	Mulga Lands

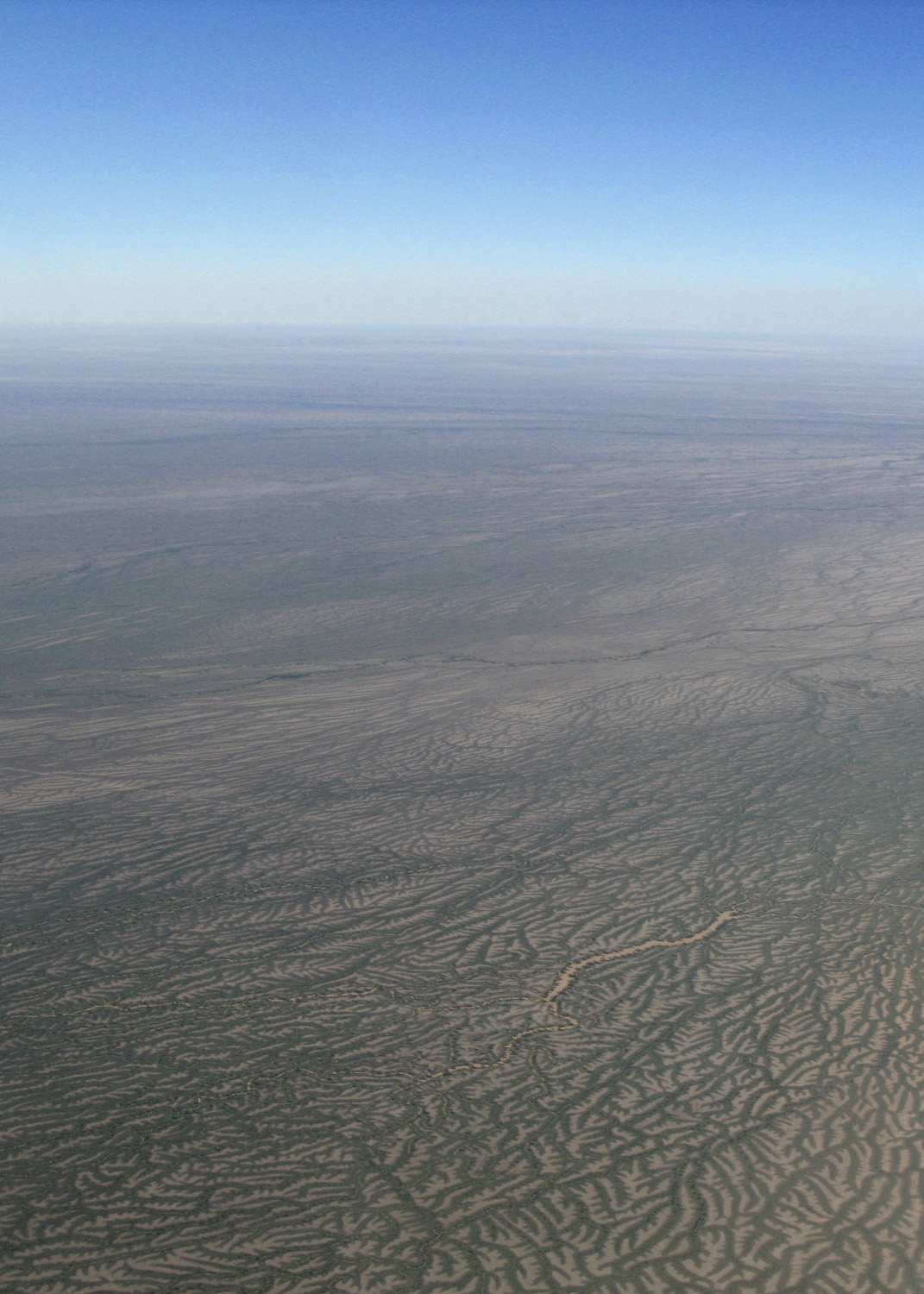
Aerial photo of the Channel Country / Cooper Creek, 2007

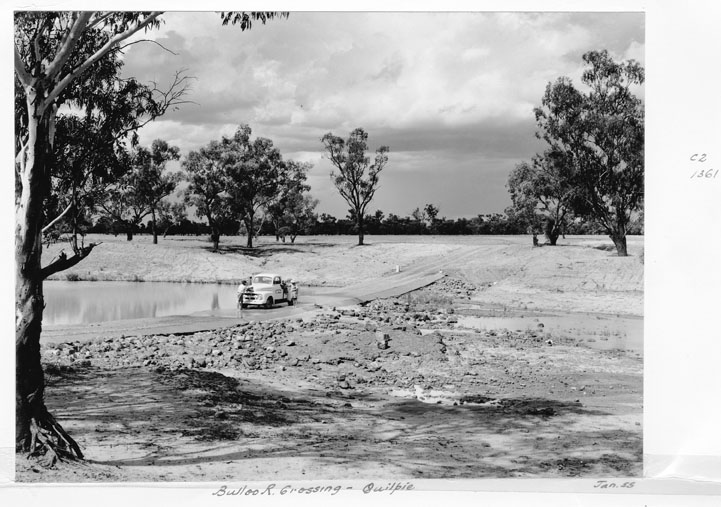
Bulloo River crossing, 1955

The Channel Country is a region of outback Australia mostly in the state of Queensland but also in parts of South Australia, Northern Territory and New South Wales. The name comes from the numerous intertwined rivulets that cross the region, which cover 150,000 km². The Channel Country is over the Cooper and Eromanga geological basins and the Lake Eyre Basin drainage basin. Further to the east is the less arid Maranoa district.

== Geography ==
Birdsville and Windorah are the most prominent towns in the area. Other settlements include Betoota and Bedourie. Haddon Corner is also located in the Channel Country. The Channel Country is the location for a majority of Min Min light sightings. It is also home to at least two important bird areas, Lake Yamma Yamma and the Lake Machattie Area.

The Channel Country features an arid landscape with a series of ancient flood plains from rivers which only flow intermittently. The principal rivers are Georgina River, Cooper Creek and the Diamantina River. When there is sufficient rainfall in their catchment area these rivers flow into Lake Eyre, South Australia. In most years the flood waters are absorbed into the earth or evaporate, however. One of the most significant rainfall events occurred in 2010 when a monsoonal low from ex-Cyclone Olga created a period of exceptional rainfall.

=== Land use ===
The primary land use is cattle grazing which has replaced sheep grazing. It is estimated that in the Queensland section alone there are between half to one million head of cattle. The area's towns and cattle stations are serviced by a mail run that is operated by West Wing Aviation which delivers goods and passengers as well as mail.

In 2013, the Queensland Government placed caps on water extraction from the region's river to prevent the introduction of cotton growing. At the same time open-cut mining was banned but coal seam and underground mining have been permitted after changes were made to the Wild Rivers legislation.

In 2021, 11 coal seam gas exploration licenses were granted to Origin Energy by the state government, covering 250,000 hectares of the region. Origin subsequently announced it is withdrawing from the region with a view to sell its exploration permits to another energy company or forfeit the sites.

=== Bioregion ===
The Interim Biogeographic Regionalisation for Australia Channel Country Bioregion covers a larger area, extending into South Australia, the Northern Territory and New South Wales and includes the town of Innamincka.

== History ==
Indigenous Australians have inhabited the area for approximately 20,000 years, with over 25 tribal groups living in the Channel Country area. A vast trade network had been established running from north to south with goods such as ochre sent north with shells and pituri moved south. Birdsville was once a major meeting place for conducting ceremonies and trade. Originally known as Diamantina Crossing, it bore its current name by 1882, and the name was formalised at the proclamation of the town in 1887.

Innamincka Station was established in 1872 by Robert Bostock and grew until it covered over 15,000 square kilometres (5,792 sq mi) and in 1881 it supported a herd of 8,000 cattle. The first station and permanent settlement set up along the Cooper Creek. The tender was accepted for the run named Caryapundy by J. C. Myers in 1872. Myers has also had his tenders accepted for other runs such as Bollwarry, Mount Wood, Teriwinda and Torrens Creek.

Annandale Station was established when Patrick Drinan took up the run in July 1876. Other properties were settled soon afterward including Kaliduwarry and Glengyle Stations. Pandie Pandie Station was established in the same year by Robert Frew as was Alton Downs and Planet Downs. Nearby Haddon Downs station was also taken up by Frew in 1877. Diamantina Lakes Station was also established in 1876 with a partnership between John Arthur Macartney and Hugh Louis Heber-Percy who initially took up the lease.

== See also ==
- Cravens Peak Reserve
- Regions of Queensland
