= Parish of Berawinia =

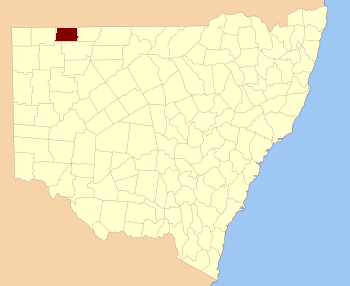
Delalah County

Berawinia, New South Wales is a remote civil Parish, of the County of Delalah, a cadasteral division of New South Wales.

== Geography ==
The topography is the flat arid landscape of the Channel County with a Köppen climate classification of BWh (Hot arid).

The economy in the parish is based on broad acre agriculture, mainly Wheat, and sheep. There are no towns in the parish and the nearest settlement is Wanaaring, New South Wales and Hungerford, Queensland.

== History ==
The parish is on the traditional land of the Barindji and their neighbors to the west the Karenggapa peoples. The first Europeans through the area were Burke and Wills and in the 1890s was included in the Albert Goldfields.

The cattle station Thurloo and Berawinna Downs were both in the parish. Berawinia Parish will be the site of a Total Solar Eclipse on 25 Nov, 2030.
