= Effluence, New South Wales =

Effluence
- Town
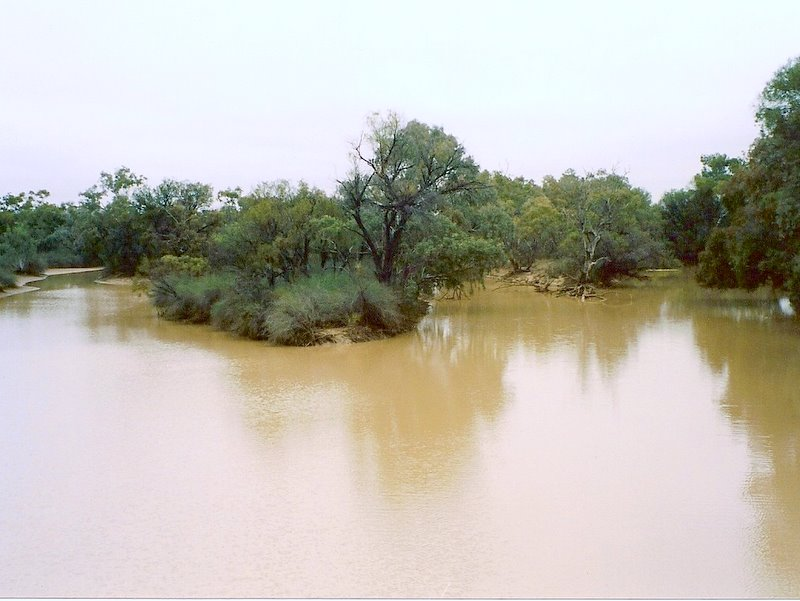
- Paroo River at Effluence

- Coordinates: 29°42′24″S 144°10′34″E
- Country: Australia
- State: New South Wales
- LGA: Bourke Shire

Government
  - State electorate: Barwon
  - Federal division: Parkes
- Elevation: 110 m (360 ft)
- Postcode: 2840
- Mean max temp: 28.0 °C (82.4 °F)
- Mean min temp: 12.9 °C (55.2 °F)
- Annual rainfall: 276 mm (10.9 in)

Effluence, New South Wales is a remote rural area in Bourke Shire, New South Wales.

Effluence is in both Barrona County and Irrara County, cadastral divisions of New South Wales. It lies on the east side of the Paroo River opposite Wanaaring parish and the town of Wanaaring. It adjoins Paroo parish in the east, Tantawanga parish in the south, and Yernca parish in the north. Both halves together are roughly 4–5 miles wide (E–W) and 14 miles long (N–S).

== Geography ==
=== Location ===
Effluence is some 980 kilometres from Sydney, and 180 km west of Bourke.

=== Climate ===
The topography of Effluence is flat and arid with a Köppen climate classification of BSh (Hot semi arid).

=== Population ===
The parish is sparsely populated with few dwellings.

Effluence lies within a single statistical Mesh Block (2016 code 10137120000) that includes Waanaring and extends eastwards to near Kerribee Creek, and south to Utah Lake. As such, there are no census data for the area separate from Waanaring.

=== Economy ===
The economy in the parish is based on broad acre agriculture, mainly Cattle, and sheep goats. Honey is also produced. There is an all-weather airstrip for the town of Waanaring (code YWAG) located in Effluence.

== History ==
The area is in the traditional lands of the Paaruntyi people and The Burke and Wills expedition were the first Europeans to the area.
