= Waverley Parish (Thoulcanna County), New South Wales =

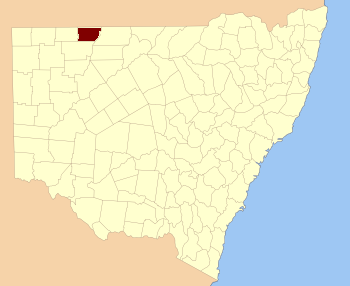
Thoulcanna County

Waverley Parish (Thoulcanna County), New South Wales is a remote civil Parish, of the Thoulcanna County, a cadasteral division of New South Wales.

== Geography ==
The topography is the flat and arid landscape of the Channel County with a Köppen climate classification of BSh (Hot semi arid).

The economy in the parish is based on broad acre agriculture, mainly Cattle. There are no towns in the parish and the nearest settlement is Hungerford, Queensland and Wanaaring, New South Wales. The Queensland and New South Wales Border runs along the northern boundary of the parish.

== History ==
The parish is on the traditional land of the Karrengappa, and Barundji people and in the 1890s was included in the Albert Goldfields. The Waverley Downs cattle Station was centered on the parish.

== See also ==
- Thoulcanna County#Parishes within this county
