= Kerrininna, New South Wales =

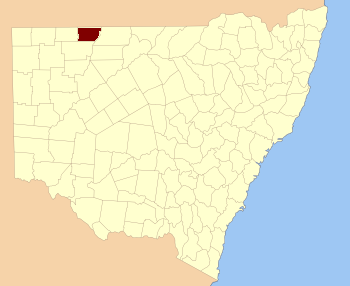
Thoulcanna County

Kerrininna, New South Wales is a remote rural locality and civil Parish, of the Thoulcanna County a cadasteral division of New South Wales. Kerrininna Parish is on the Paroo River south of Hungerford, Queensland.

== Geography ==
The topography is the flat and arid with a Köppen climate classification of BSh (Hot semi arid).

The economy in the parish is based on broad acre agriculture, mainly Cattle. There are no towns in the parish and the nearest settlement is Hungerford, Queensland, upstream.

== History ==
The parish is on the traditional land of the Karrengappa and Barundji people, and in the 1890s it was included in the Albert Goldfields.
