= Parish of Catombal (Delalah County) =

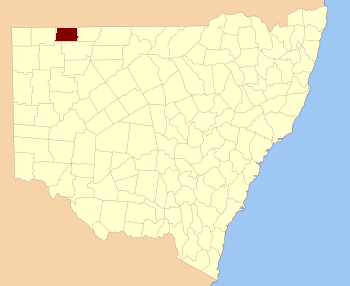
Delalah County

Catombal Parish, New South Wales is a civil Parish, of the County of Delalah, a cadasteral division of New South Wales.

== Geography ==
The topography is the flat arid landscape of the Channell County with a Köppen climate classification of BWh (Hot arid).

The economy in the parish is based on broad acre agriculture, mainly Wheat, and sheep. There are no towns in the parish and the nearest settlement is Wanaaring, New South Wales and then Hungerford, Queensland.

== History ==
The parish is on the traditional land of the Barindji people. The first Europeans through the area were Burke and Wills and in the 1890s was included in the Albert Goldfields.

The cattle station Elsinora Downs gave its name to the parish.
