= Parish of Hebden =

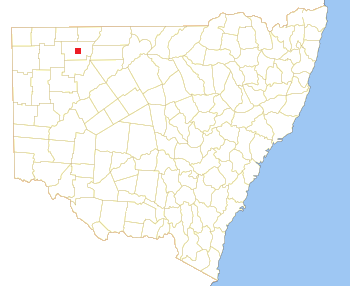
Location of the Parish

Hebden is a Parish of Ularara County in north west New South Wales.

Located at 29.725556°S 143.983056°E 10 km west of Wanaaring, New South Wales the main economic activity of the parish is agriculture. The climate is semi-arid, featuring low rainfall, very hot summer temperatures and cool nights in winter.

The Parish is on Possum Creek, a tributary of the Paroo River.

== History ==
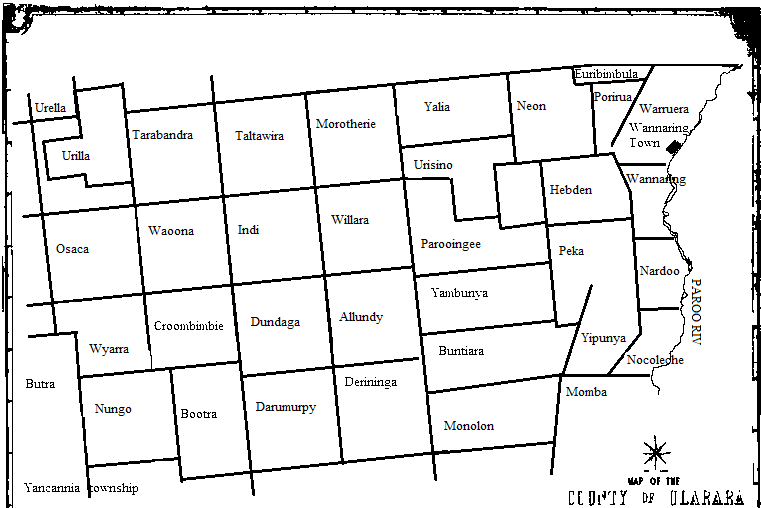
Map of Ularara County in North west New South Wales

Hebden Parish is on the traditional lands of the Paaruntyi people and The Burke and Wills expedition were the first Europeans to the area.

== Climate ==
The climate is semi-arid, featuring low rainfall, very hot summer temperatures and cool nights in winter. The parish has a Köppen climate classification of BWh (Hot desert). A minimum temperature of -3.9 °C was recorded in July 1997.

Wanaaring

Climate chart (precipitation, max. and min. temperature)
J	F	M	A	M	J	J	A	S	O	N	D
35 37 22	34 35 21	26 33 17	16 28 13	24 23 9	20 19 6	18 19 4	15 21 5	14 26 9	20 29 13	25 32 17	29 35 20
- █ Average max. and min. temperatures in °C
- █ Precipitation totals in mm
Imperial conversion
J	F	M	A	M	J	J	A	S	O	N	D
1.4 99 72	1.3 95 70	1 91 63	0.6 82 55	0.9 73 48	0.8 66 43	0.7 66 39	0.6 70 41	0.6 79 48	0.8 84 55	1 90 63	1.1 95 68
- █ Average max. and min. temperatures in °F
- █ Precipitation totals in inches
