= Parish of Warruera =

Parish of Warruera, New South Wales Located at 29.624722°S 144.178611°E, six km north of Wanaaring, New South Wales, Australia is a cadastral parish of Ularara County New South Wales.

== History ==
The parish is on the Paroo River and the traditional lands of the Paaruntyi people. The Burke and Wills expedition were the first Europeans to the area, passing a few miles to the west.

== Climate ==
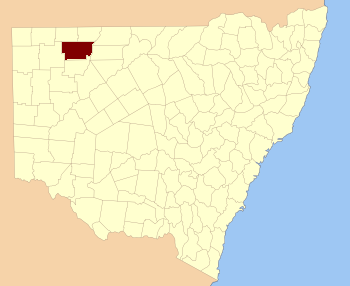
Ularara County NSW.

The climate is semi-arid, featuring low rainfall, very hot summer temperatures and cool nights in winter. The parish has a Köppen climate classification of BWh (Hot desert).

Wanaaring

Climate chart (precipitation, max. and min. temperature)
J	F	M	A	M	J	J	A	S	O	N	D
35 37 22	34 35 21	26 33 17	16 28 13	24 23 9	20 19 6	18 19 4	15 21 5	14 26 9	20 29 13	25 32 17	29 35 20
- █ Average max. and min. temperatures in °C
- █ Precipitation totals in mm
Imperial conversion
J	F	M	A	M	J	J	A	S	O	N	D
1.4 99 72	1.3 95 70	1 91 63	0.6 82 55	0.9 73 48	0.8 66 43	0.7 66 39	0.6 70 41	0.6 79 48	0.8 84 55	1 90 63	1.1 95 68
- █ Average max. and min. temperatures in °F
- █ Precipitation totals in inches
