= Parish of Yambunya =

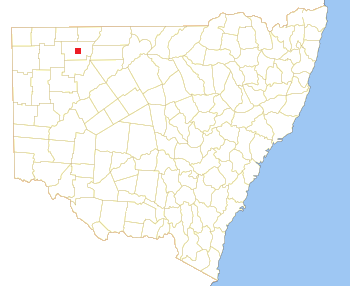
Location of the Parish

Yambunya is a parish of Ularara County in northwest New South Wales, Australia. It is between Milparinka and Wilcannia and west of Wanaaring.

The main economic activity of the parish is agriculture, with the Ardoo and the Salisbury Downs Station, and the parish is at 29°55′59″S 143°46′28″E.

== History ==
The parish is in the traditional lands of the Bandjigali and Karenggapa people. The Burke and Wills expedition were the first Europeans to the area.

== Geography ==
Yambunya parish has mainly red soil semi-open Mulga country with stands of box and beefwood running into some harder Mulga stone country. The main groundcover is Woollybutt. The soft soils have the ability to grow a wide variety and mix of grasses and herbages in season.

== Climate ==
The climate is semi-arid, featuring low rainfall, very hot summer temperatures and cool nights in winter. The parish has a Köppen climate classification of BWh (Hot desert). A minimum temperature of -3.9 °C was recorded in nearby Wanaaring in July 1997.

Wanaaring

Climate chart (precipitation, max. and min. temperature)
J	F	M	A	M	J	J	A	S	O	N	D
35 37 22	34 35 21	26 33 17	16 28 13	24 23 9	20 19 6	18 19 4	15 21 5	14 26 9	20 29 13	25 32 17	29 35 20
- █ Average max. and min. temperatures in °C
- █ Precipitation totals in mm
Imperial conversion
J	F	M	A	M	J	J	A	S	O	N	D
1.4 99 72	1.3 95 70	1 91 63	0.6 82 55	0.9 73 48	0.8 66 43	0.7 66 39	0.6 70 41	0.6 79 48	0.8 84 55	1 90 63	1.1 95 68
- █ Average max. and min. temperatures in °F
- █ Precipitation totals in inches
