= Evelyn Parish (Thoulcanna County), New South Wales =

Civil Parish in New South Wales, Australia

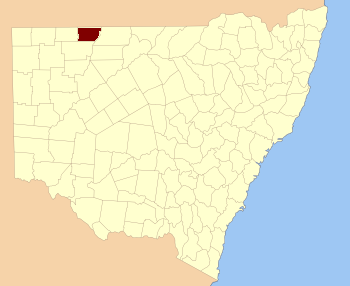
Thoulcanna County

Evelyn Parish, on the Paroo River, is a remote civil Parish, of Thoulcanna County, a cadasteral division of New South Wales.

The topography is the flat and arid with a Köppen climate classification of BSh (Hot semi arid) and the economy is based on broad acre agriculture, mainly Cattle, and sheep. There are no towns in the parish and Evelyn Parish is midway between Hungerford, Queensland and Wanaaring, New South Wales to the south.

The parish is on the traditional lands of the Barundji people.

== See also ==
- Thoulcanna County#Parishes within this county
