= Parish of Indi =

Coordinates: 29.8125°S 143.4°E

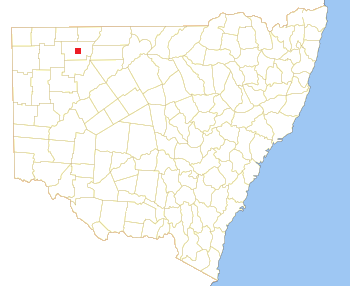
Location of the parish

Indi, New South Wales, located at 29°48'45.0"S 143°24'00.0"E is a parish of Ularara County in north west New South Wales, Australia. It is between Milparinka, New South Wales and Wilcannia.

Indi is located between Milparinka and Wanaaring. The main economic activity of the parish is agriculture, with the Ardoo and the Salisbury Downs Station.

The climate is semi-arid, featuring low rainfall, very hot summer temperatures and cool nights in winter. The parish has a Köppen climate classification of BWh (Hot desert).

The parish is on traditional lands of the Karenggapa people.
