= Talyeale, New South Wales =

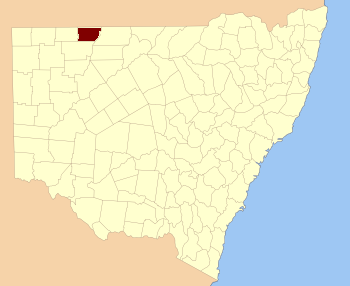
Thoulcanna County

Talyeale, New South Wales is a remote rural locality and civil Parish, of the Thoulcanna County, a cadasteral division of New South Wales.

== Geography ==
The topography is flat and arid with a Köppen climate classification of BSh (Hot semi arid).

The economy in the parish is based on broad acre agriculture, mainly Cattle. There are no towns in the parish and the nearest settlement is Hungerford, Queensland. The Queensland and New South Wales Border (and Dingo fence) runs along the northern boundary of the parish.

== History ==
The parish is on the traditional land of the Karrengappa, Barundji and Badjiri people, and in the 1890s it was included in the Albert Goldfields. The parish will be the site of a Total Solar Eclipse on 25 Nov, 2030.
