= Parish of Allundy =

Allundy New South Wales
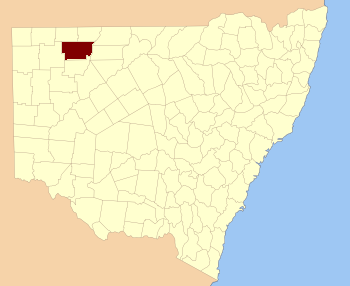
- Ularara County NSW

- Coordinates: 29°53′05″S 143°34′02″E
- County: Ularara County

Allundy, New South Wales is a parish of Ularara County in north west New South Wales, Australia.

The main economic activity of the parish is agriculture.

The Salisbury Downs Station is to the west of Allundy.

The parish is on traditional lands of the Karenggapa people.

== Climate ==
The climate is semi-arid, featuring low rainfall, very hot summer temperatures and cool nights in winter. The parish has a Köppen climate classification of BWh (Hot desert). A minimum temperature of -3.9 °C was recorded in nearby Wanaaring in July 1997.

Wanaaring

Climate chart (precipitation, max. and min. temperature)
J	F	M	A	M	J	J	A	S	O	N	D
35 37 22	34 35 21	26 33 17	16 28 13	24 23 9	20 19 6	18 19 4	15 21 5	14 26 9	20 29 13	25 32 17	29 35 20
- █ Average max. and min. temperatures in °C
- █ Precipitation totals in mm
Imperial conversion
J	F	M	A	M	J	J	A	S	O	N	D
1.4 99 72	1.3 95 70	1 91 63	0.6 82 55	0.9 73 48	0.8 66 43	0.7 66 39	0.6 70 41	0.6 79 48	0.8 84 55	1 90 63	1.1 95 68
- █ Average max. and min. temperatures in °F
- █ Precipitation totals in inches
