= Parish of Elsinora =

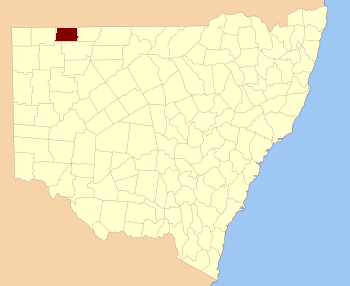
Delalah County

Elsinora, in New South Wales, Australia, is a civil parish of the county of Delalah, a cadasteral division of New South Wales.

== Geography ==
The topography is the flat arid landscape of the Channel County with a Köppen climate classification of BWh (Hot arid).

The economy in the parish is based on broad acre agriculture, mainly wheat, and sheep. There are no towns and the nearest settlement is Wanaaring, New South Wales, and then Hungerford, Queensland. The Queensland and New South Wales border runs along the northern boundary of the parish.

== History ==
The parish is on the traditional land of the Barindji people. The first Europeans through the area were Burke and Wills and in the 1890s it was included in the Albert Goldfields.

The cattle station of Elsinora Downs gave its name to the parish.
