= Ularara County =

Ularara
- Cadastral division
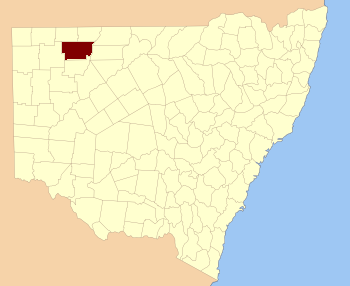
- Location in New South Wales
- Country: Australia
- State: New South Wales
Lands administrative divisions around Ularara
Delalah	Thoulcanna	Irrara
Yantara	Ularara	Barrona
Yantara	Fitzgerald	Landsborough

Ularara County is one of the 141 cadastral divisions of New South Wales. It is located to the west of the Paroo River.

The name Ularara is believed to be derived from a local Aboriginal word and is also the name of the local Ularara Station.

== Parishes within this county ==
A full list of parishes found within this county; their current LGA and mapping coordinates to the approximate centre of each location is as follows:

Parish	LGA	Coordinates
Allundy	Unincorporated	29°53′05″S 143°34′02″E
Bootra	Unincorporated	30°00′49″S 143°15′03″E
Buntiara	Unincorporated	29°58′45″S 143°47′30″E
Croombimbie	Unincorporated	29°56′19″S 143°14′03″E
Deriringa	Unincorporated	30°06′37″S 143°34′02″E
Dundaga	Unincorporated	29°57′35″S 143°24′02″E
Hebden	Unincorporated	29°43′32″S 143°58′59″E
Indi	Unincorporated	29°48′45″S 143°24′00″E
Momba	Unincorporated	30°02′08″S 144°03′03″E
Morotherie	Unincorporated	29°40′04″S 143°33′49″E
Narumerpy	Unincorporated	30°02′03″S 143°24′02″E
Neon	Unincorporated	29°39′46″S 143°56′04″E
Nocoleche	Unincorporated	29°52′17″S 144°06′07″E
Nungo	Unincorporated	30°04′40″S 143°07′23″E
Parooingee	Unincorporated	29°49′30″S 143°46′25″E
Peka	Unincorporated	29°53′04″S 143°58′36″E
Porirua	Unincorporated	29°35′53″S 144°05′12″E
Taltaweira	Unincorporated	29°35′30″S 143°23′57″E
Tarrabandra	Unincorporated	29°40′07″S 143°14′06″E
Urilla	Unincorporated	29°39′19″S 143°04′07″E
Urisino	Unincorporated	29°41′27″S 143°45′03″E
Wanaaring	Bourke Shire	29°40′45″S 144°07′51″E
Waoona	Unincorporated	29°44′20″S 143°14′05″E
Warruera	Unincorporated	29°37′29″S 144°10′43″E
Willara	Unincorporated	29°44′23″S 143°33′50″E
Wyarra	Unincorporated	29°56′16″S 143°06′23″E
Yailah	Unincorporated	29°36′44″S 143°45′01″E
Yambunya	Unincorporated	29°55′59″S 143°46′28″E
Yipunyah	Unincorporated	29°58′47″S 143°59′38″E
