= Currabenya, New South Wales =

Remote rural locality

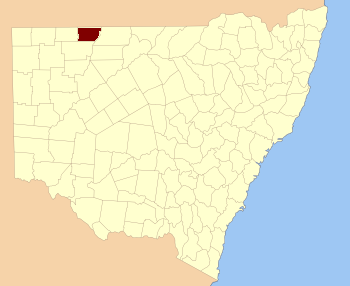
Thoulcanna County

Currabenya, New South Wales is a remote rural locality and civil Parish, of Thoulcanna County, a cadasteral division of New South Wales.

== Geography ==
The topography is flat and arid with a Köppen climate classification of Bwh (Desert).

The economy in the parish is based on broad acre agriculture (mainly Cattle), and there are no towns in the parish. The nearest settlements are Hungerford, Queensland; Wanaaring, New South Wales; and Tibooburra, New South Wales to the west. The Queensland and New South Wales borders run along the northern boundary of the parish.

== History ==
The parish is on the traditional land of the Bardadji people, and in the 1890s was included in the Albert Gold Fields.
