= Yernca Parish (Thoulcanna County), New South Wales =

Yernca is a rural locality of Bourke Shire located at 29°34′09″S 144°23′49″E and a remote civil Parish, of the Thoulcanna County a cadasteral division of New South Wales.

== Geography ==
The topography is flat and arid with a Köppen climate classification of BSh (Hot semi arid).

The economy in Yernca is based on broad acre agriculture, mainly Cattle, and sheep. There are no towns in the parish and the nearest settlement is Wanaaring, New South Wales to the south.

The parish of Yernca is on the traditional land of the Barundji people.

Yernca Parish is the only part of Thoulcanna County that is not unincorporated.

== See also ==
- Thoulcanna County#Parishes within this county
