= Windoley, New South Wales =

Coordinates: 30°16′20″S 144°05′27″E

- Coordinates
- Country: Australia
- State: New South Wales
- County: Landsborough County

Windoley, New South Wales is a rural locality and civil parish of County of Landsborough Located on the Paroo River, Windoley is the only part of the county that is unincorporated.

The postcode is 2840 and the nearest town is Wanaaring, New South Wales.

== History ==
The traditional owners of the area are the Paruntiji, meaning people belonging to the Paroo. Aboriginal people are known to have lived along the Paroo for at least 14,000 years (Robins, 1999).

The Burke and Wills expedition were the first Europeans to the area, passing a few miles to the west.

Graziers came as squatters to the Paroo in the 1840s. They met resistance from the Aboriginal land owners, and tensions in the area continued well into the 1860s. From the 1850s however a shortage of white labour caused by the exodus to the gold fields saw many in the Aboriginal communities join the pastoral workforce. Aboriginal people continued to be a significant part of this work force for many decades whilst still maintaining their cultural traditions and attending local and regional ceremonies until the 1910s. From the 1920s however, Aboriginal people began to be forcibly removed from their land by government policy.

From the 1880s to the 1910 drought, overstocking and rabbit infestation led to massive damage to land, soil and native plants and animals.

== Climate ==
The climate is semi-arid, featuring low rainfall, very hot summer temperatures and cool nights in winter. The parish has a Köppen climate classification of BWh (Hot desert).

== Environment ==
The Paroo River wetlands are important for threatened species such as the freckled duck and the Australian painted snipe. They lie within the Paroo Floodplain and Currawinya Important Bird Area, identified as such by BirdLife International because of its importance, when conditions are suitable, for large numbers of waterbirds.
