= Flood Parish (Thoulcanna County), New South Wales =

Australian parish

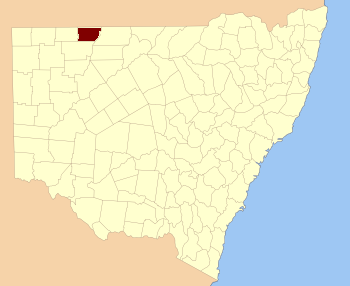
Thoulcanna County

Flood Parish, New South Wales is a remote rural locality and civil Parish, of Thoulcanna County, a cadasteral division of New South Wales.

== Geography ==
The topography is the flat and arid with a Köppen climate classification of Bwh (Desert).

The economy in the parish is based on broad acre agriculture, mainly Cattle, and there are no towns in the parish and the nearest settlement is Hungerford, Queensland and Wanaaring, New South Wales, with Tibooburra, New South Wales further to the west. The parish will be the site of a Total Solar Eclipse on 25 Nov, 2030.

== History ==
The parish is on the traditional land of the Bardadji people, and in the 1890s was included in the Albert Gold Fields. The parish was part of Berawinna Downs Station in the 20th century.
