= Parish of Korri =

Korri Parish is a remote civil Parish, of the County of Delalah a cadasteral division of New South Wales.

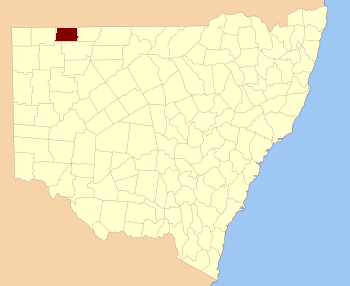
Delalah County

== Geography ==
The Parish is located at 29°07′10″S 142°55′48″E. The topography is the flat arid landscape of the Channel County with a Köppen climate classification of BWh (Hot semi arid).

The economy in the parish is based on broad acre agriculture, mainly Wheat, and sheep. There are no towns in the parish and the nearest settlement is Tibooburra, New South Wales and Hungerford, Queensland. The Queensland and New South Wales Border runs along the northern boundary of the parish.

== History ==
The parish is on the traditional land of the Karrengappa people. The first Europeans through the area were Burke and Wills and in the 1890s was included in the Albert Goldfields.
