= Parish of Dundaga =

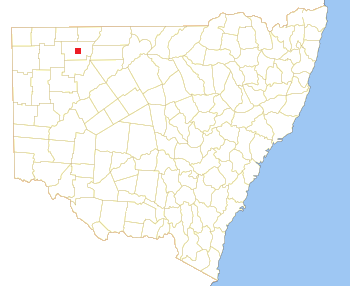
Location of the Parish

Dundaga is a Parish of Ularara County in north west New South Wales, Australia. It is between Milparinka, New South Wales and Wilcannia and west of Wanaaring. The main economic activity of the parish is agriculture, with the Ardoo and the Salisbury Downs Station . the parish is at 29°57′35″S 143°24′02″E.

== History ==
The Parish is in the traditional lands of the Bandjigali and Karenggapa people. The Burke and Wills expedition were the first Europeans to the area.

== Geography ==
The parish has a Köppen climate classification of BWh (Hot desert).
