= Coorallie (Barrona County parish) =

Coorallie is a remote civil Parish, of the County of Barrona, a cadasteral division of New South Wales.

Coorallie is on the Paroo River near Wanaaring, New South Wales. The topography is the flat and arid with a Köppen climate classification of BSk (Hot semi arid).
