= Thoulcanna County =

Thoulcanna New South Wales
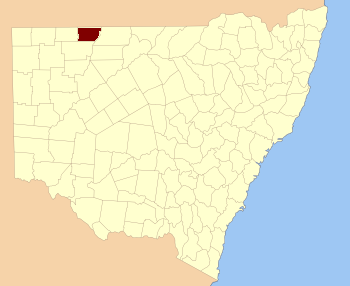
- Location in New South Wales
Lands administrative divisions around Thoulcanna:
Queensland	Queensland	Queensland
Delalah	Thoulcanna	Irrara
Ularara	Ularara	Barrona

Thoulcanna County is one of the 141 cadastral divisions of New South Wales. It is located south of the border with Queensland, to the west of the Paroo River near Wanaaring in the Bourke Shire.

The name Thoulcanna is believed to be derived from a local Aboriginal word and is also the name of the local Thoulcanna Station.

== Parishes within this county ==
A full list of parishes found within this county; their current LGA and mapping coordinates to the approximate centre of each location is as follows:

Parish	LGA	Coordinates
Clear Water	Unincorporated	29°22′42″S 144°17′32″E
Colaine	Unincorporated	29°33′01″S 143°42′38″E
Currabenya	Unincorporated	29°06′35″S 143°44′49″E
Davis	Unincorporated	29°10′21″S 143°58′15″E
Davison	Unincorporated	29°22′43″S 143°41′57″E
Eurimbula	Unincorporated	
Evelyn	Unincorporated	29°20′43″S 144°22′20″E
Feehan	Unincorporated	29°13′54″S 144°04′46″E
Flood	Unincorporated	29°15′19″S 143°42′09″E
Kelly	Unincorporated	29°13′36″S 144°24′33″E
Kerrininna	Unincorporated	29°10′07″S 144°23′25″E
Nardoo	Unincorporated	29°31′56″S 144°08′49″E
Newland	Unincorporated	29°09′44″S 144°11′12″E
Odonnell	Unincorporated	29°13′46″S 144°15′27″E
Stony Ridge	Unincorporated	29°28′59″S 144°17′56″E
Talyeale	Unincorporated	29°01′21″S 144°07′50″E
Waverley	Unincorporated	29°06′01″S 143°58′16″E
Willera	Unincorporated	29°26′38″S 143°53′50″E
Yernca	Bourke Shire	29°34′09″S 144°23′49″E
