= Parish of Neon =

Parish of Ularara County, New South Wales, Australia

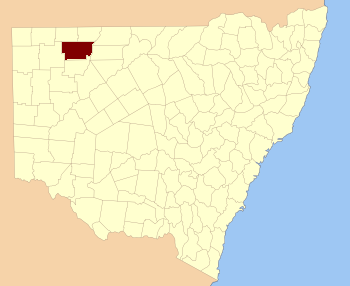
Ularara County NSW.

Neon Parish, New South Wales is a rural locality and a cadastral parish of Ularara County New South Wales.

The parish is located at 29.39460°S 143.56040°E and sits on Possum Creek, a Tributary of the Paroo River. The climate is semi-arid, featuring low rainfall, very hot summer temperatures and cool nights in winter.

== History ==
The parish is on the traditional lands of the Paaruntyi people.

The Burke and Wills expedition were the first Europeans to the area, passing a few miles to the west.

== Geography ==
The parish has a Köppen climate classification of BWh (Hot desert).

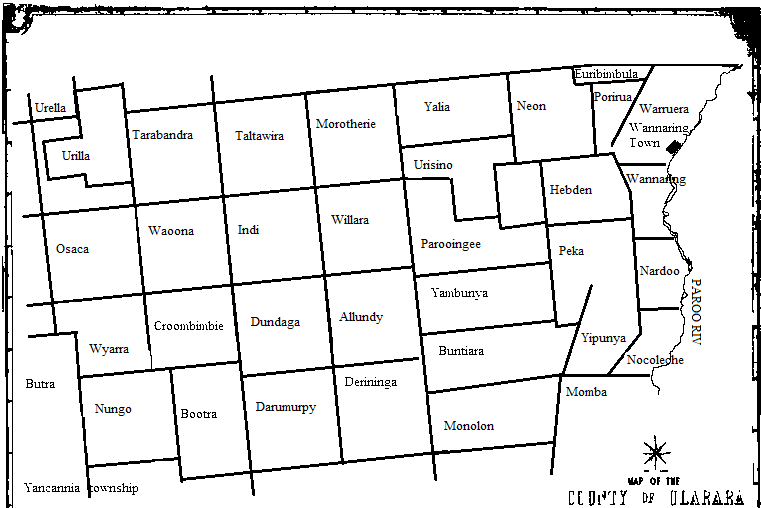
Map of Ularara County in North west New South Wales
