= Byjerk (Barrona County parish) =

Byjerk Parish is a remote civil Parish, of the County of Barrona, a cadasteral division of New South Wales.

Byjerk is on the Paroo River near Wanaaring, New South Wales. The topography is the flat and arid with a Köppen climate classification of BSk (Hot semi arid).

Byjerk is the only part of Barrona County that is unincorporated.
