= Parish of Delalah South =

Delalah South is a remote civil Parish, of the County of Delalah a cadasteral division of New South Wales.

== Geography ==
The Parish is located at 29°22′24″S 143°07′01″E. The topography of the parish is the flat and arid with a Köppen climate classification of BWh (Hot semi arid).

The economy in the parish is based on broad acre agriculture, mainly Cattle, and some sheep. There are no towns in the parish and the nearest settlement is Tibooburra, New South Wales.

== History ==
The parish is on the traditional land of the Karrengappa people. The first Europeans through the area were Burke and Wills and in the 1890s was included in the Albert Goldfields.
