= Kelly Parish (Thoulcanna County), New South Wales =

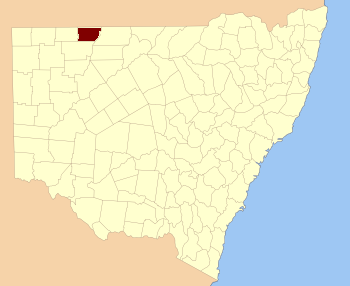
Thoulcanna County

Kelly Parish is a remote rural locality on the Paroo River and a civil Parish, of the Thoulcanna County a cadasteral division of New South Wales.

The topography is the flat and arid with a Köppen climate classification of BSh (Hot semi arid) and the economy is based on broad acre agriculture, mainly Cattle, and sheep. There are no towns in the parish and the nearest settlement is Hungerford, Queensland and Wanaaring, New South Wales to the south.

== See also ==
- Thoulcanna County#Parishes within this county
