= Parish of Deriringa =

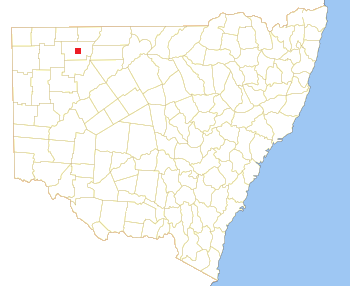
Location of the Parish

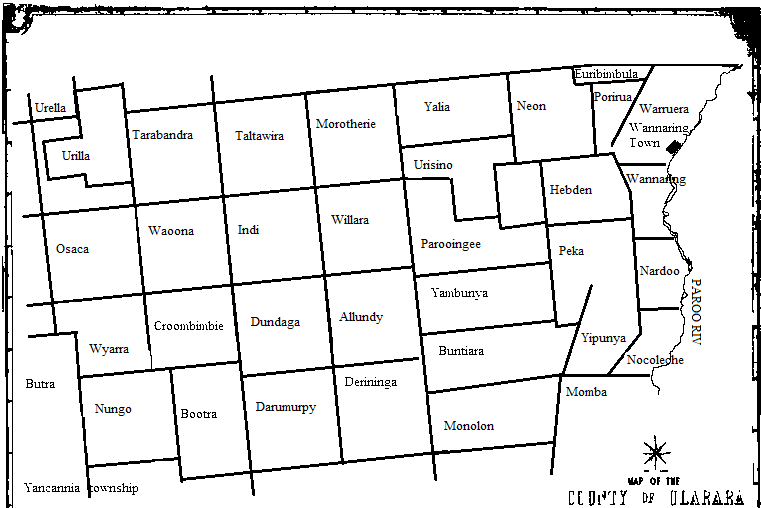
Map of Ularara County in North west New South Wales

Deriringa is a Parish of Ularara County in north west New South Wales. It is between Milparinka, New South Wales and Wilcannia and west of Wanaaring. The main economic activity of the parish is agriculture, with the Ardoo and the Salisbury Downs Station . the parish is at 30°06′37″S 143°34′02″E.

== Climate ==
The climate is semi-arid, featuring low rainfall, very hot summer temperatures and cool nights in winter. The parish has a Köppen climate classification of BWh (Hot desert). A minimum temperature of -3.9 °C was recorded in nearby Wanaaring in July 1997.

Wanaaring

Climate chart (precipitation, max. and min. temperature)
J	F	M	A	M	J	J	A	S	O	N	D
35 37 22	34 35 21	26 33 17	16 28 13	24 23 9	20 19 6	18 19 4	15 21 5	14 26 9	20 29 13	25 32 17	29 35 20
- █ Average max. and min. temperatures in °C
- █ Precipitation totals in mm
Imperial conversion
J	F	M	A	M	J	J	A	S	O	N	D
1.4 99 72	1.3 95 70	1 91 63	0.6 82 55	0.9 73 48	0.8 66 43	0.7 66 39	0.6 70 41	0.6 79 48	0.8 84 55	1 90 63	1.1 95 68
- █ Average max. and min. temperatures in °F
- █ Precipitation totals in inches
