= Thysanotus admirabilis =

Scientific classification
- Kingdom: Plantae
- Clade: Tracheophytes
- Clade: Angiosperms
- Clade: Monocots
- Order: Asparagales
- Family: Asparagaceae
- Subfamily: Lomandroideae
- Genus: Thysanotus
- Species: T. admirabilis

Binomial name
- Thysanotus admirabilis Jian Wang ter

Species of plant

Thysanotus admirabilis is a species of flowering plant in the Asparagaceae family, and is endemic to the Queensland, Australia. It is a tufted, clumping, perennial herb with yellow tubers, 20 to 40 linear leaves at the base of the plant, and panicles of purple flowers with hairy buds, and six stamens, the ovary with two ovules per locule.

== Description ==
Thysanotus admirabilis is a tufted, clumping, perennial herb with a rootstock 5–10 mm (0.20–0.39 in) in diameter. It has 20 to 40 linear leaves 250–370 mm (9.8–14.6 in) long and 0.5–1 mm (0.020–0.039 in) long and channelled near the base. The flowers are borne in panicles 260–410 mm (10–16 in) long, usually only branching 70–250 mm (2.8–9.8 in) from the top. Each umbel has more than 20 flowers, each flower on a pedicel 70–160 mm (2.8–6.3 in) long. The flower buds are covered with woolly hairs and the flowers are purple, the sepals lance-shaped, 1.8–2.2 mm (0.071–0.087 in) wide with creamy edges, and the perianth 13–15 mm (0.51–0.59 in) long with a purple fringe 3.8–4.4 mm (0.15–0.17 in) wide with a darker purplish strip in the centre. There are six stamens and the ovary has two ovules per locule.

== Taxonomy ==
Thysanotus admirabilis was first formally described in 2022 by Juan Wang in the journal Austrobaileya from specimens collected in Mariala National Park. The specific epithet (admirabilis) means 'admirable', referring to the "surprising and astonishing of the flower perianth, which is covered with white hairs".

== Distribution and habitat ==
This species is only known from the Mariala National Park and adjacent areas of a neighbouring grazing property in the Mulga Lands bioregion. It grows in run-off areas of low Acacia aneura woodland with scattered Eucalyptus populnea and Eremophila species in reddish-brown soils.

== Conservation status ==
Thysanotus admirabilis is listed as of "least concern" under the Queensland Government Nature Conservation Act 1992.
