= Urella Downs Station =

Pastoral lease in New South Wales

Coordinates: 29.61461°S 143.06242°E

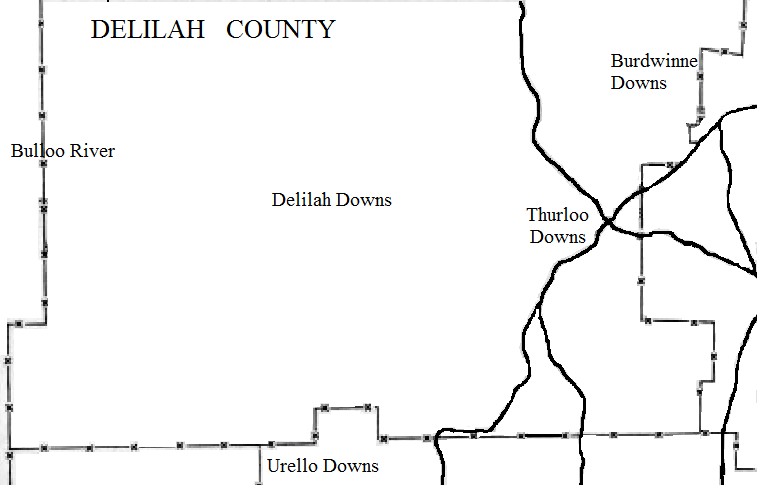
Cattle Station in Delilah County

Urella Downs Station is a cattle station in far western New South Wales.

Urella Downs station is located at 29º 36' 52.6" S 143º 03' 44.73" E. that is on Bloodwood Creek east of the Pindera Downs Aboriginal Area, about 900 km west-northwest of Sydney, 140 km north of Whitecliffs and 80 km east of Tibooburra, New South Wales. Urella Downs is at an altitude of about 100m above sea level. The Bulloo River flows through the western portion of the station.

For many years the station was operated by the Taylor family. Nearby cattle stations include the adjoining Caryapundy, Urisino, Salisbury Downs and Thurloo Downs, as well as Bulloo Downs Station, Yancannia Station further away.
