= Parish of Yailah =

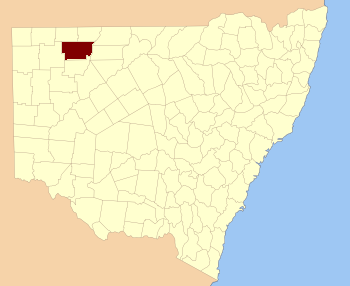
Ularara County.

Yailah, New South Wales is a Parish of Ularara County in north west New South Wales. It is at 29°36′44″S 143°45′01″E between Milparinka, New South Wales and Wilcannia and west of Wanaaring. The main economic activity of the parish is agriculture.

== History ==
The Burke and Wills expedition were the first Europeans to the area, passing a few miles to the west.

== Climate ==
The climate is semi-arid, featuring low rainfall, very hot summer temperatures and cool nights in winter. The parish has a Köppen climate classification of BWh (Hot desert).
