= Tantawanga (Barrona County parish) =

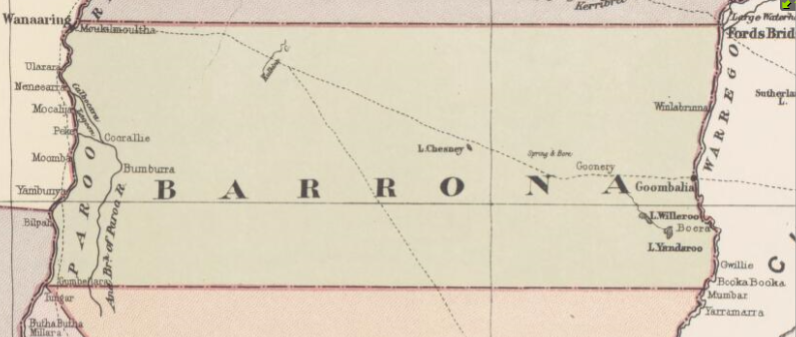
Barrona County in John Sands 1886 map

Tantawanga Parish is a remote civil Parish, of the County of Barrona, a cadasteral division of New South Wales.

Tantawanga is on the Paroo River near Wanaaring, New South Wales. The topography is the flat and arid with a Köppen climate classification of BSk (Hot semi arid).
