= Delalah County =

Delalah New South Wales
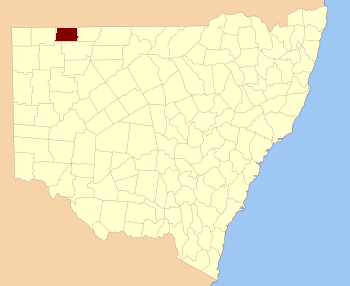
- Location in New South Wales
Lands administrative divisions around Delalah:
Queensland	Queensland	Queensland
Tongowoko	Delalah	Thoulcanna
Yantara	Ularara	Ularara

Delalah County is one of the 141 cadastral divisions of New South Wales.

Delalah is believed to be derived from a local Aboriginal word and is also the name of Delalah Downs property – within the county area.

== Parishes within this county ==
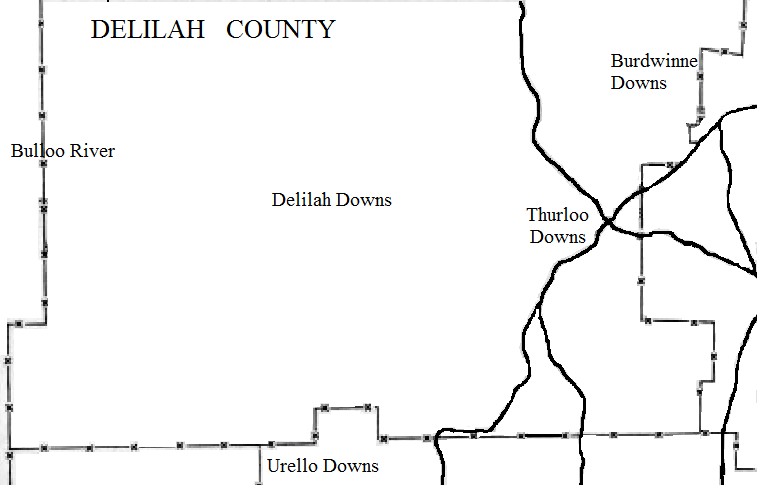
A map of Delilah County, NSW on the border with Queensland.

A full list of parishes found within this county; their current LGA and mapping coordinates to the approximate centre of each location is as follows:

Parish	LGA	Coordinates
Albert	Unincorporated	29°22′22″S 142°57′41″E
Berawinia	Unincorporated	29°11′19″S 143°34′56″E
Border	Unincorporated	29°07′01″S 143°07′21″E
Bulloo	Unincorporated	29°12′55″S 142°47′29″E
Caloola	Unincorporated	29°02′07″S 143°36′43″E
Catombal	Unincorporated	29°19′11″S 143°27′03″E
Connulpie	Unincorporated	29°30′54″S 142°44′00″E
Corriwelpie	Unincorporated	29°02′06″S 142°46′42″E
Cullamulcha	Unincorporated	29°06′22″S 143°17′24″E
Delalah	Unincorporated	29°14′37″S 143°06′37″E
Delalah South	Unincorporated	29°22′24″S 143°07′01″E
Downs	Unincorporated	29°14′34″S 142°56′42″E
Elsinora	Unincorporated	29°26′38″S 143°32′58″E
Killen	Unincorporated	29°15′11″S 143°17′26″E
Korri	Unincorporated	29°07′10″S 142°55′48″E
Nocotunga	Unincorporated	29°28′49″S 143°23′33″E
Omura	Unincorporated	29°30′58″S 142°53′59″E
Osaca	Unincorporated	29°26′36″S 143°14′58″E
Thoulcanna	Unincorporated	29°02′06″S 143°27′19″E
Thurlow	Unincorporated	29°10′46″S 143°27′21″E
Tongowoko	Unincorporated	29°21′52″S 142°48′04″E
Tooma	Unincorporated	29°22′40″S 143°17′16″E
Urella	Unincorporated	29°26′34″S 143°04′10″E

From 2009, the parishes of Delalah lie within District H of the Darling Livestock Health and Pest District.
