= Barrona County =

Barrona New South Wales
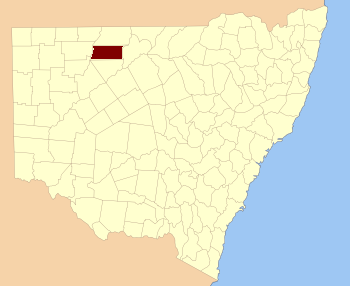
- Location in New South Wales
Lands administrative divisions around Barrona:
Thoulcanna	Irrara	Gunderbooka
Ularara	Barrona	Gunderbooka
Fitzgerald	Landsborough	Gunderbooka

Barrona County is one of the 141 cadastral divisions of New South Wales. It is bounded by the Warrego River in the east and the Paroo River in the west.

Barrona is believed to be derived from a local Aboriginal word and the nearby Barrona Downs also carries that Aboriginal name.

== Parishes within this county ==
A full list of parishes found within this county; their current LGA and mapping coordinates to the approximate centre of each location is as follows:

Parish	LGA	Coordinates
Ballycastle	Bourke Shire	30°02′43″S 145°02′45″E
Blarney	Bourke Shire	30°00′44″S 144°55′08″E
Buntiara	Bourke Shire	29°52′54″S 144°26′25″E
Byjerk	Unincorporated	30°06′38″S 144°09′03″E
Cahirnane	Bourke Shire	30°08′08″S 144°24′23″E
Coorallie	Bourke Shire	30°03′52″S 144°12′57″E
Curragh	Bourke Shire	29°46′45″S 145°15′09″E
Dargle	Bourke Shire	29°55′24″S 144°49′05″E
Effluence	Bourke Shire	unknown
Gleena	Bourke Shire	30°02′12″S 144°25′13″E
Goombalie	Bourke Shire	30°05′54″S 145°21′31″E
Goonery	Bourke Shire	30°06′47″S 145°07′28″E
Kulkyne	Bourke Shire	29°49′06″S 144°34′53″E
Longside	Bourke Shire	30°07′25″S 144°36′35″E
Maghera	Bourke Shire	29°55′09″S 145°03′43″E
Mere	Bourke Shire	30°15′20″S 145°03′12″E
Merrita South	Bourke Shire	29°49′04″S 145°06′15″E
Merrita West	Bourke Shire	29°51′30″S 144°56′57″E
Nummo	Bourke Shire	30°07′37″S 144°17′07″E
Otako	Bourke Shire	29°58′32″S 144°34′49″E
Paroo	Bourke Shire	unknown
Round Hill	Bourke Shire	29°58′37″S 145°13′32″E
Tantawanga	Bourke Shire	29°48′59″S 144°14′55″E
Uteeara	Bourke Shire	30°10′47″S 145°15′58″E
Wanga	Bourke Shire	29°45′42″S 144°45′09″E
Wentworth	Bourke Shire	30°05′44″S 144°46′09″E
Winnalabrinna	Bourke Shire	29°47′51″S 145°22′30″E
Yandaroo	Bourke Shire	30°04′48″S 145°14′03″E
