= Pelora, New South Wales =

Pelora, New South Wales is a rural locality and civil parish of County of Landsborough located at 30°18′48″S 144°39′46″E to the north west of the town of Louth, New South Wales. The parish is in Bourke Shire.

== History ==
The traditional owners of the area are the Paruntiji, meaning people belonging to the Paroo. Aboriginal people are known to have lived along the Paroo for at least 14,000 years (Robins, 1999).

The Burke and Wills expedition were the first Europeans to the area, passing a few miles to the west.

== Climate ==
The climate is semi-arid, featuring low rainfall, very hot summer temperatures and cool nights in winter. The parish has a Köppen climate classification of BWh (Hot desert).
