= Parish of Nocoleche =

Cadastral parish in Australia

The Parish of Nocoleche is a cadastral parish of Ularara County in north western New South Wales.

== Climate ==
The climate is semi-arid, featuring low rainfall, very hot summer temperatures and cool nights in winter. The parish has a Köppen climate classification of BWh (Hot desert). However, the Paroo River at this point has a number of wetlands, which makes the parish somewhat of an oasis in the otherwise arid landscape.

== History ==
The traditional owners of the Paroo River area are the Budjair, Kunja and Mardgany in the north and the Paruntiji, meaning people belonging to the Paroo, in the south. Aboriginal people are known to have lived along the Paroo for at least 14,000 years (Robins, 1999).

The Burke and Wills expedition were the first Europeans to the area, passing a few miles to the west.

Graziers came as squatters to the Paroo in the 1840s. They met resistance from the Aboriginal land owners, and tensions in the area continued well into the 1860s. From the 1850s however a shortage of white labour caused by the exodus to the gold fields saw many in the Aboriginal communities join the pastoral workforce. Aboriginal people continued to be a significant part of this work force for many decades whilst still maintaining their cultural traditions and attending local and regional ceremonies until the 1910s. From the 1920s however, Aboriginal people began to be forcibly removed from their land by government policy.

From the 1880s to the 1910 drought, overstocking and rabbit infestation led to massive damage to land, soil and native plants and animals.

In 1978 the parish was incorporated into the Nocoleche Nature Reserve. These Paroo River Wetlands are today an important site under the Ramsar Convention.

== Sources ==
- "Nocoleche Nature Reserve Plan of Management". NSW Environment & Heritage. January 2000. Material was copied from this source, which is available under a Creative Commons Attribution 4.0 International License.
