= Momba =

Momba may refer to:

== Places ==
- Momba, Zambia, a former kingdom
- Momba Station, a pastoral lease in outback New South Wales, Australia
- Parish of Momba, New South Wales, a cadastral parish
- Momba, Gourma, a settlement in Fada N’Gourma Department, Gourma Province, Burkina Faso
- Momba District, Tanzania
- Momba River, a river in Tanzania and Zambia

== Other uses ==
- Momba, name of the Wicked Witch of the West in The Wonderful Wizard of Oz (1910 film)

== See also ==
- Mamba, a snake genus
