= Parish of Yipunyah =

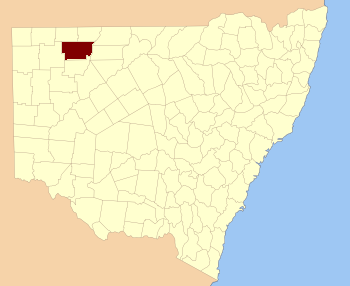
Ularara County NSW

Yipunyah Parish is a Parish of Ularara County in north west New South Wales. It is at 29°58′47″S 143°59′38″E between Milparinka, New South Wales and Wilcannia and west of Wanaaring.

The main economic activity of the parish is agriculture, but the landscape is an arid, treeless scrubland typical of the channel country and population rates are less than 1 person per 160 km². Part of the parish is in the Nocoleche Nature Reserve.

== History ==
The Burke and Wills expedition were the first Europeans to the area, passing a few miles to the west.

== Climate ==
The climate is semi-arid, featuring low rainfall, very hot summer temperatures and cool nights in winter. The parish has a Köppen climate classification of BWh (Hot desert).
