= Parish of Urisino =

Parish of Urisino, New South Wales located at 29.690833°S 143.750833°E is a cadastral parish of Ularara County New South Wales.

== History ==
The Burke and Wills expedition were the first Europeans to the area, passing a few miles to the west.

== Climate ==
The climate is semi-arid, featuring low rainfall, very hot summer temperatures and cool nights in winter. The parish has a Köppen climate classification of BWh (Hot desert). Major features of the parish include Mulghany Creek(a tributary of the Paroo River, Feeder Creek and the cut line road.
