= Mount Browne =

Town in New South Wales

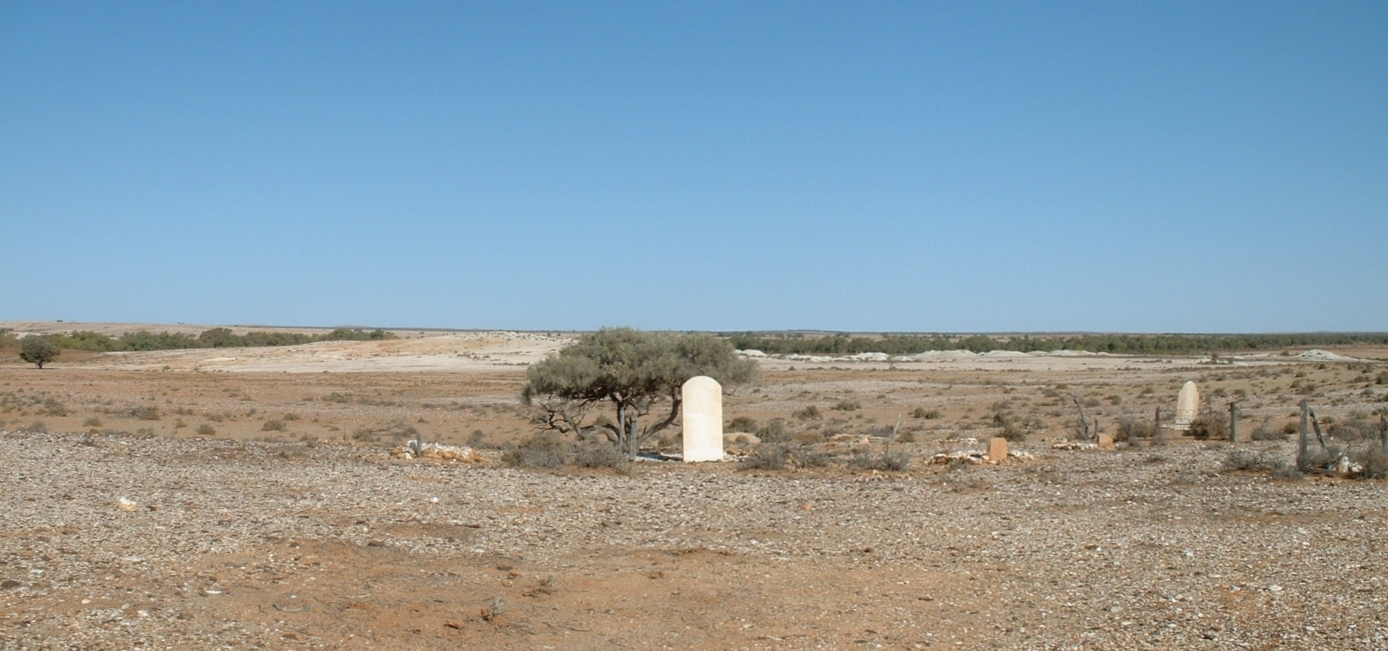
Cemetery at Mount Browne

Mt Browne was a town on the Albert Goldfield, west of Milparinka, New South Wales that existed briefly but of which only a few ruins remain today. A cemetery can also be found some distance from the Mt Browne diggings. The lack of water made gold prospecting extraordinarily difficult. Dry blowing was used and some miners even carted their gold bearing dirt to Milparinka where they washed it in the town's waterhole. The diggings were largely abandoned by 1893.

== History ==
Gold was discovered at Mt Browne. A contemporary description of the dry blowing process used at Mount Browne in 1881 states that miners there went to work with "a small broom made of twigs and a tin dish". A miner would use his broom to sweep dust and rock fragments from surface exposures of slate and collect it in the tin dish. Once his dish was "about half full of dirt", the miner would stand "with his back or side to the wind ... and begin throwing the stuff up and catching it, or sometimes slowly pouring it from one dish to another", allowing the wind to carry away the less dense particles, leaving the gold behind in the dish. This process required "very dry surface dirt." When "good sized nuggets" were found, they were removed from the dish before the remaining material was processed. If he saw smaller pieces of gold in the dish, the miner might use his own breath to blow the sand and dust away. The observer found the dry blowing process to be "both tedious and unhealthy."[ It was reported in 1884 that

" At Mount Browne there is now no water left, so dry-blowing is again resorted to. But at present there is very little work being done, as the shearing on the neighbouring runs has induced many of the miners at Mount Browne to go away for a short time.

In 1889, a mining claim was sold to Melbourne-based mining syndicate associated with Mark (or Marc) Fink, a younger brother of Benjamin Fink. The Mount Browne Amalgamated Gold-mining Company was incorporated, but the venture appears not to have prospered.

There was a school there from January 1889 to December 1898. There is a cemetery.

In June 1902 a meteorite landed at Mt Brown.

Summer temperatures can reach 50 °C.
