= Landsborough County =

Landsborough
- Cadastral division
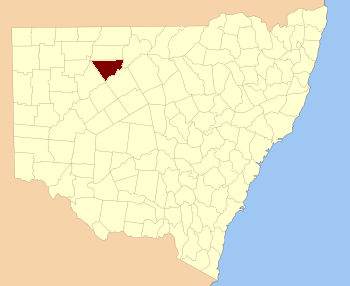
- Location in New South Wales
- Country: Australia
- State: New South Wales
Lands administrative divisions around Landsborough
Ularara	Barrona	Gunderbooka
Fitzgerald	Landsborough	Gunderbooka
Killara	Rankin	Yanda

Landsborough County is one of the 141 cadastral divisions of New South Wales. It is located to the north-west of the Darling River.

Landsborough County was named in honour of the explorer William Landsborough (1825–1886).

== Parishes within this county ==
A full list of parishes found within this county; their current LGA and mapping coordinates to the approximate centre of each location is as follows:

Parish	LGA	Coordinates
Barcoola	Bourke Shire	30°22′22″S 145°11′42″E
Biparo	Bourke Shire	30°15′24″S 144°15′33″E
Burry Gurry	Bourke Shire	30°16′45″S 145°08′16″E
Campamooka	Bourke Shire	30°43′53″S 144°36′39″E
Coolpooka	Bourke Shire	30°21′58″S 144°51′38″E
Coonong	Bourke Shire	30°27′10″S 144°32′46″E
Delta	Bourke Shire	30°27′46″S 144°55′29″E
Dunlop	Bourke Shire	30°16′20″S 144°05′27″E
Goolgumbla	Bourke Shire	30°16′30″S 144°23′56″E
Happy Valley	Bourke Shire	30°20′05″S 145°00′49″E
Hora	Bourke Shire	30°29′14″S 144°40′14″E
Hylaman	Bourke Shire	30°40′04″S 144°48′18″E
Jung Jung	Bourke Shire	30°38′21″S 144°39′46″E
Kapiti	Bourke Shire	
Mulyah	Bourke Shire	30°35′34″S 144°28′06″E
Nalticomebee	Bourke Shire	30°28′27″S 145°05′12″E
Newfoundland	Bourke Shire	30°49′25″S 144°39′52″E
Pelora	Bourke Shire	30°18′48″S 144°39′46″E
Singoramba	Bourke Shire	30°13′38″S 144°37′43″E
Talowla	Bourke Shire	30°17′32″S 145°14′15″E
Tindeanda	Bourke Shire	30°23′14″S 144°17′33″E
Uliara	Bourke Shire	30°21′21″S 145°20′41″E
Wilson	Bourke Shire	30°10′10″S 144°54′54″E
Windoley	Unincorporated	30°16′20″S 144°05′27″E
Yarramarra	Bourke Shire	30°14′53″S 145°19′23″E
