= Parish of Croombimbie =

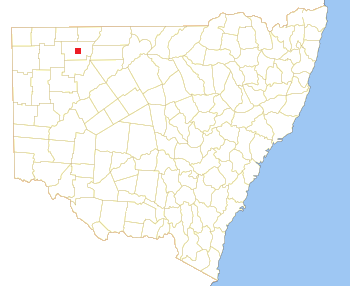
Location of the Parish

Croombimbie is a Parish of Ularara County in north west New South Wales.

Located at 29°56′19″S 143°14′03″E on the Bootra Creek the main economic activity of the parish is agriculture. The climate is semi-arid, featuring low rainfall, very hot summer temperatures and cool nights in winter. The parish has a Köppen climate classification of BWh (Hot desert).
