= Parish of Momba =

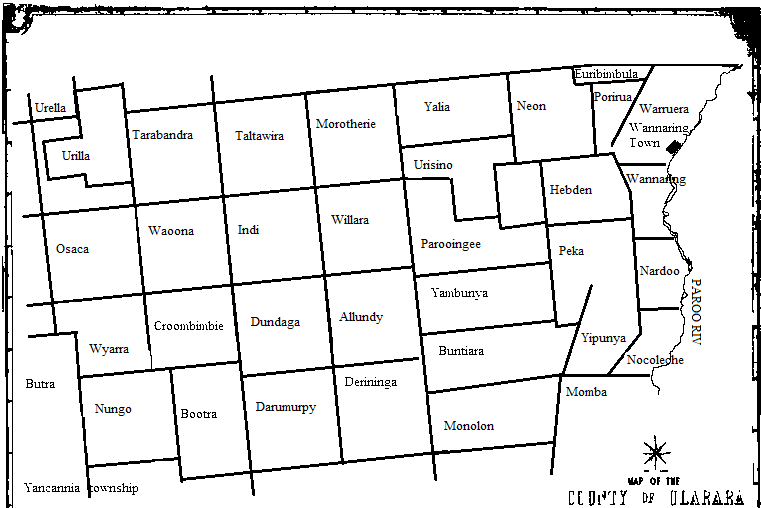
Map of Ularara County in North west New South Wales

Momba, located at 30.035556°S 144.050833°E, is a cadastral parish of Ularara County, New South Wales, located on the Paroo River.

The main economic activity of the parish is agriculture and the climate is semi-arid, featuring low rainfall, very hot summer temperatures and cool nights in winter. The parish has a Köppen climate classification of BWh (hot desert).
