= Parish of Tarrabandra =

Parish in Ularara County, New South Wales

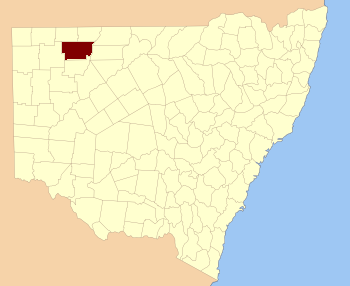
Ularara County NSW.

The Parish of Tarrabandra is a cadastral parish of Ularara County New South Wales.

The Burke and Wills expedition were the first Europeans to the area, passing a few miles to the west. The climate is semi-arid, featuring low rainfall, very hot summer temperatures and cool nights in winter. The parish has a Köppen climate classification of BWh (Hot desert).
