= Parish of Waoona =

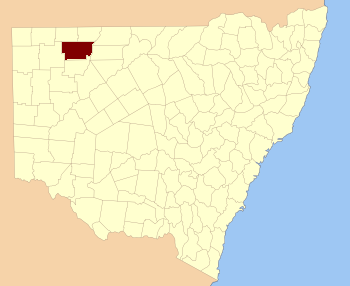
Ularara County NSW.

Parish of Waoona, New South Wales located at 29.738889°S 143.234722°E is a cadastral parish of Ularara County New South Wales.

== History ==
The Burke and Wills expedition were the first Europeans to the area, passing a few miles to the west.

== Climate ==
The climate is semi-arid, with sparse vegetation, low rainfall, very hot summer temperatures and cool nights in winter. The parish has a Köppen climate classification of BWh (Hot desert).

Major features of the parish include Mulgha Creek, Bloodwood Creek and the cut line road.
