= Parish of Morotherie =

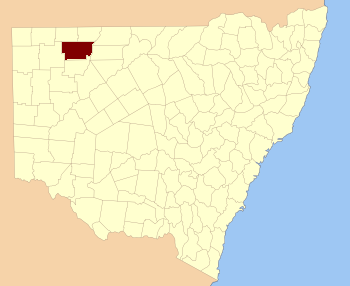
Ularara County NSW.

Morotherie is a cadastral parish of Ularara County New South Wales.
