= Parish of Urilla =

Cadastral parish in New South Wales, Australia

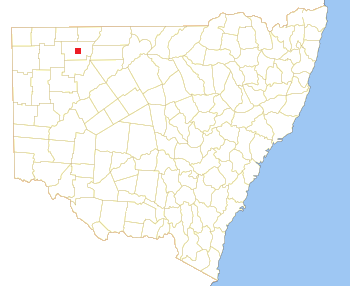
Location of the Parish

Urilla Parish located at 29.655278°S 143.068611°E is a cadastral parish of Ularara County New South Wales.

== History ==
The Burke and Wills expedition were the first Europeans to the area, passing a few miles to the west.

== Climate ==
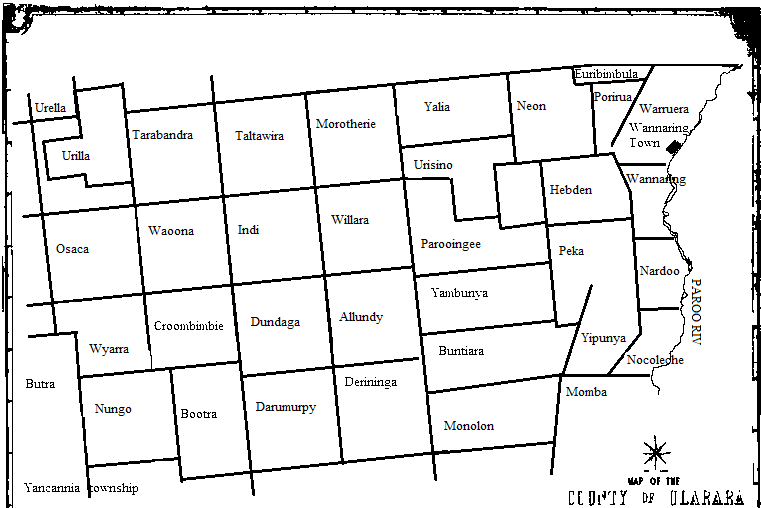
Map of Ularara County in North west New South Wales

The climate is semi-arid, featuring low rainfall, very hot summer temperatures and cool nights in winter.

The parish has a Köppen climate classification of BWh (Hot desert).
