= Parish of Nungo =

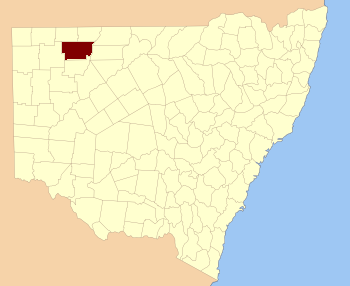
Ularara County NSW.

Morotherie is a cadastral parish of Ularara County New South Wales.

The Parish is located at 30.077778°S 143.123056°E west of Wanaring and north of White Cliffs, New South Wales.
