= Elsinora =

Pastoral lease in New South Wales

Coordinates: 29°27.576′S 143°34.151′E

Location in New South Wales

Elsinora Station, most commonly known as Elsinora, is a pastoral lease that has operated as both a sheep station and a cattle station in outback New South Wales. It is situated approximately 160 kilometres (99 mi) north of White Cliffs and 240 kilometres (149 mi) north west of Bourke close to the Queensland border.

== History ==
The station was established in 1882 by Edward Killen, who took up the lease of virgin unimproved and waterless country with boundaries that had not been surveyed. The property occupied an area of 317,000 acres (128,285 ha) and Killen stocked it with sheep.

By 1883 the owners had spent £13,000 on improvements, and by 1888 some 70,000 sheep were depastured at the station. Water boring was successful at Elsinora in 1893 when a flow rate of 1,000,000 imperial gallons (5 ML) per day was produced.

In 1894 approximately 100,000 sheep were being shorn at Elsinora.

The property was owned by Killen and Co. in 1912; Killen also owned Mooculta Station.

Sidney Kidman acquired the property in 1918 along with Urisino and Thurloo Downs from Goldsbrough Mort & Co. and held it until 1923.

== See also ==
- List of ranches and stations
