= Urisino =

Pastoral lease in New South Wales

Coordinates: 29°42′18″S 144°05′24″E

Location in New South Wales

Urisino Station, most commonly known as Urisino, is a pastoral lease that has operated as both a sheep station and a cattle station in outback New South Wales.

It is situated about 140 kilometres (87 mi) north east of White Cliffs and 200 kilometres (124 mi) west of Bourke. The vegetation is predominantly composed of mulga and mixed native species including bimble box. In 2014 the area had found to have been overgrazed by sheep and feral goats.

== History ==
Urisino was owned by Samuel Wilson in the 1860s. By 1883 the owners had spent £28,800 on improvements. In 1894 approximately 120,000 sheep were being shorn at Urisino.

In 1913 the property was running sheep and was being managed by Mr Tooth who was also the manager of Elsinora and Thurloo Downs Stations.

Ursino was later a strategic watering hole for stock belonging to Sidney Kidman. Kidman acquired the property in 1918 along with Elsinora and Thurloo Downs from Goldsbrough Mort & Co. and held it until 1923.

The property occupied an area of 81,200 acres (32,860 ha) in 1935 and received an average rainfall of 9 inches (229 mm).

The station was abandoned and in disrepair in 1992 when it was acquired by Andrea Rudd and Paul Hansen. The pair restored the homestead making it suitable tourist accommodation.

Since 2007 the station has been the focus of the largest carbon project in Australia's history; the Urisino Forest Regeneration Project. The project works to de-stock the overgrazing feral animals in a humane way, allowing the flora and fauna to recover from the previous drought-stricken state. It is recognised under the Australian Carbon Farming Initiative.

== See also ==
- List of ranches and stations
