= Mariala National Park =

National park in Australia

- IUCN category II (national park)
- Location within Queensland
- Location: Queensland
- Nearest city: Adavale
- Coordinates: 26°01′46″S 145°04′17″E
- Area: 269.2 km^{2} (103.9 sq mi)
- Established: 1992
- Governing body: Queensland Parks and Wildlife Service
- Website: Official website

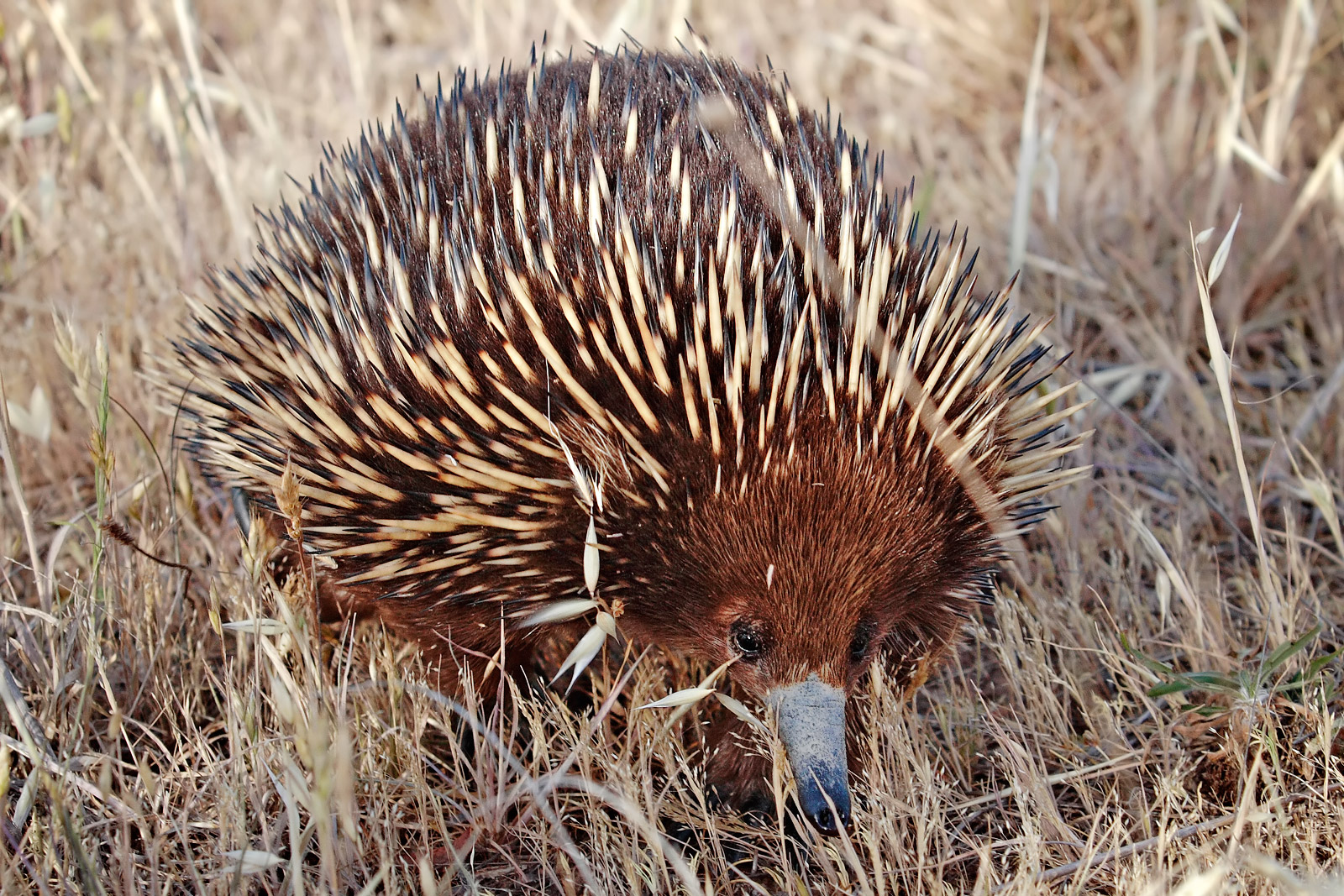

Mariala National Park is a national park in South West Queensland, Australia, 810 km west of Brisbane. Mariala lies within the Mulga Lands bioregion and the Shire of Quilpie local government area. It is located with the water catchment areas of the Bulloo, Paroo and Warrego rivers. Mariala covers 269.2 km^{2} (104 sq mi).

The park was part of the Ambathala pastoral holding which operated from 1875 until the early 1980s. In 1982, the area became a scientific reserve, making it the first protected area to preserve part of Queensland's extensive Mulga Lands. A decade later, it was declared a national park.

A total of six rare or threatened species have been identified in the national park. These include Major Mitchell's cockatoo and the rare square-tailed kite.

== See also ==
- Protected areas of Queensland
