= Dry blowing =

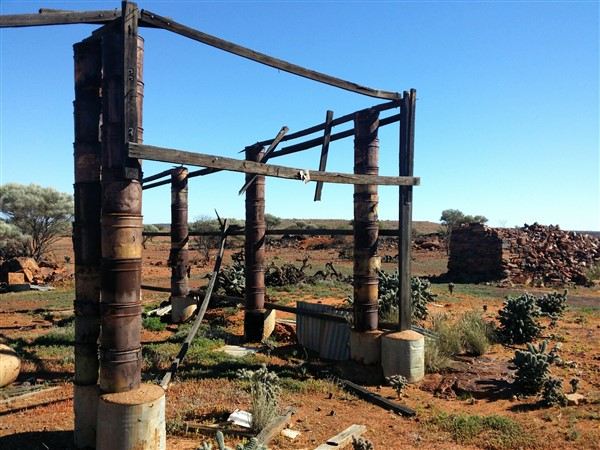
Poverty Flats in Western Australia is where alluvial gold was discovered by Steadman in November, 1891. It became one of the largest gold dry blowing areas in the Murchison. Photographed 2016

Dry blowing is a method to extract gold particles from dry soil without the use of water. A machine specialized to use this method is known as a dry blower. It is a form of winnowing.

== Methods ==
- One method is to pour dry soil from a height into a pan, allowing the wind to blow away finer dust. The denser gold particles to fall into the pan.
- Alternatively, the prospector would use one pan and throw dirt up into the air and catch it.

== See also ==
- Sluice box
