= Barindji =

The Barindji, also written Parrintyi, are an indigenous Australian people of the state of New South Wales. They are to be distinguished from the Paaruntyi, who spoke a similar language but whom they called the spitting people.

== Name ==
Parrintyi, according to one theory, meant forest dwellers in the local languages, but another view suggests it may have originated from the toponym for a creek known as the Paroo, reflecting prior tribal links.

Tindale glosses this attribution by suggesting that the term may derive from a creek name, called the Paroo, reflecting prior tribal links. An exonym, mamba (devils) was once used by the Darling River aborigines, who were terrified of the Parrintyi.

== Country ==
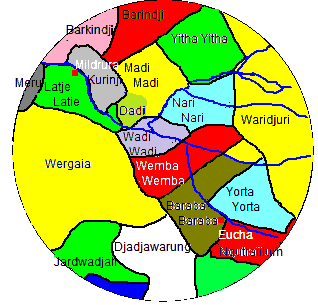
Aboriginal tribes of Riverina

Norman Tindale estimated Parrintyi lands as encompassing roughly 9,000 square miles (23,000 km^{2}) of tribal territory. Their land consisted of large stretches of mallee, mulga, swamp and sand land running parallel to, and east of, the Darling River. Tindale set their southern boundaries from Moira to within 30 miles (48 km) of Euston, and their eastern extension in the vicinity of Ivanhoe. To their west, he added, they took in Manara Range, Albermarle, Carowra, Kilfera, Manfred and Willandra Lakes.

Running clockwise from the north, their neighbours were the Naualko, followed by the Ngiyambaa to their east, the Yitayita on their southeastern flank, while the southern Paakantyi inhabited the land to their west.

== Social organization ==
The Parrintyi were organized into clans (hordes) of which the following eight are known:

- Lagerung
- Murro
- Milparo
- Boanjilla
- Pularli
- Nielyi-gulli
- Kurlkgulli
- Karndukul

== Traditional culture ==
Their water often was obtained from the roots of water mallee (Eucalyptus) trees and Hakea, hence their camping places were widely dispersed and often were casual. Some of the neighbours had more disparaging names for them. The Barindji, living in dry country, extracted water from hakea and mallee. In periods of drought, they would resort, in large mobs, to riverine areas in other tribal lands, engendering fear among, and conflict with, the riverine tribal groups.

Their burial practices are similar to the very ancient burials at nearby Mungo Lake indicating a long time in the area. The Parrintyi were described by Thomas Mitchell and Charles Sturt on their respective explorations of the area and described in colonial times by local landowners A.L.P. Cameron and Alfred William Howitt.

== Alternative names ==
- Barrengee
- Beriait, Berri-ait (Note: On the confusion surrounding these two variants, see Hercus 1989, pp. 48–49)
- Paru, Paroo
- Bpaaroo (creek name)
- Bpaa'roon-jee
- Bpaaroo (Darling River creek name, not the Paroo River)
- Bpaa'roon-jee (reflects exonym for the Barindji used by the Maraura)

== Sources ==
- Berndt, Ronald Murray; Berndt, Catherine Helen; Stanton, John E. (1993). A World that was: The Yaraldi of the Murray River and the Lakes, South Australia. UBC Press. ISBN 978-0-774-80478-3.
- Bonney, Frederic (1884). "On Some Customs of the Aborigines of the River Darling, New South Wales". Journal of the Anthropological Institute of Great Britain and Ireland. 13: 122–137. doi:10.2307/2841717. JSTOR 2841717.
- Cameron, A. L. P. (1885). "Notes on Some Tribes of New South Wales". Journal of the Anthropological Institute of Great Britain and Ireland. 14: 344–370. doi:10.2307/2841627. JSTOR 2841627.
- Douglas, Kirsty (2010). Pictures of Time Beneath Enlarge cover Science, Heritage and the Uses of the Deep Past. Csiro publishing. ISBN 978-0-643-09704-9.
- Hercus, Luise A. (1989). "Three Linguistic Studies from far Southwestern NSW". Aboriginal History. 13 (1). Canberra: 45–62.
- Howitt, Alfred William (1904). The native tribes of south-east Australia (PDF). Macmillan.
- Newland, Simpson (1887–1888). "Parkengees, or aboriginal tribes on the Darling River" (PDF). Proceedings of the Royal Geographical Society of Australasia, South Australian Branch. 2: 20–32.
- Newland, Simpson (1926). Memoirs of Simpson Newland. Adelaide: F.W. Preech and Sons.
- Pechey, W. A. (1872). "Vocabulary of the Cornu Tribes of Australia". Journal of the Anthropological Institute of Great Britain and Ireland. 1: 143–147. doi:10.2307/2840949. JSTOR 2840949.
- Richards, C. (24 September 1903a). "The Marraa' Warree' tribes or nation and their language". Science of Man. 6 (8): 119–126.
- Richards, C. (31 December 1903b). "Marraa' Warree' orf Marrae Arree". Science of Man. 6 (11): 163–169.
- Tindale, Norman Barnett (1974). "Barindji(NSW)". Aboriginal Tribes of Australia: Their Terrain, Environmental Controls, Distribution, Limits, and Proper Names. Australian National University Press. ISBN 978-0-708-10741-6. Archived from the original on 6 March 2017.
