= Thurloo Downs =

Pastoral lease in New South Wales

Coordinates: 29°17.308′S 143°28.140′E

Location in New South Wales

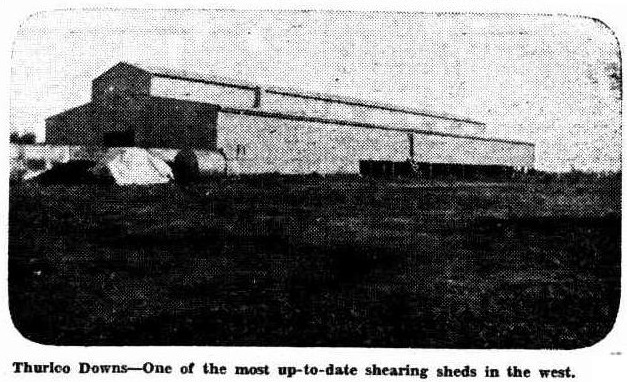
Shearing Shed at Thurloo Downs 1935

Thurloo Downs Station, most commonly known as Thurloo Downs, is a pastoral lease that has operated as both a sheep station and a cattle station in outback New South Wales. It is located approximately 175 kilometres (109 mi) north of White Cliffs and 255 kilometres (158 mi) north west of Bourke on the Berawinnia Creek close to the Queensland border.

Established in 1883, the property today includes former stations Margalah, Caloola, Delalah Downs, and Yarralee. Since being purchased by the New South Wales Government in 2023, it has been undergoing conversion into a national park.

== History ==
Established prior to 1883, in that year it was owned by Messrs Rowan and Mactier.

The property was inspected in 1896, when John Samuel Barrow was manager, and occupied an area of 200,800 acres (81,261 ha) and was fully enclosed with eight tanks, one dam and one well.

John Augustus Ibbott acquired the property in 1903 and settled there with his family of five sons and two daughters.

Sidney Kidman acquired the property in 1918, along with Urisino and Elsinora, from Goldsbrough Mort & Co.

In 1954 part of Thurloo Downs, along with Elsinora, were resumed for the soldier settlement scheme for returned servicemen from Korea and Malayan operation forces. The total area resumed was 77,341 acres (31,299 ha), forming a block known as Kendabooka, and was first drawn by Lieutenant Joe Waites.

At some point, four other former stations were acquired and incorporated into Thurloo Downs: Margalah, Caloola, Delalah Downs, and Yarralee.

=== Conversion to national park ===
The New South Wales Government bought the property in 2023 for A$108 million to convert it into a national park, in the largest-ever such acquisition of private land for such a purpose in the history of the state. Before being opened to the public in 2026, the government is working on eradicating feral animals from the property, which include pigs, dogs, foxes, and cats. The park is home to many threatened species, and will be the third largest in NSW, after Kosciuszko and Wollemi.

== Geography and description ==
Thurloo Downs is located approximately 175 kilometres (109 mi) north of White Cliffs, New South Wales, and 255 kilometres (158 mi) northwest of Bourke, on the Berawinnia Creek, close to the border with Queensland, between Bourke and Tibooburra. It covers 437,394 ha (1,080,820 acres).

The property is about two-thirds lightly timbered open country with the remainder made up of sandhills and stony ridges. There are also waterholes and wetlands on the property.

== Eclipse ==
Thurloo Downs will be the site of a total solar eclipse on 25 November 2030.

== See also ==
- List of ranches and stations
