= Paaruntyi =

The Paaruntyi are an indigenous Australian people of the state of New South Wales. They are not to be confused with the Parrintyi.

== Country ==
According to Norman Tindale's calculations the Paaruntyi would have exercised control over some 8,000 square miles (21,000 km^{2}) of tribal land, around the Paroo River and Cuttaburra and Kulkyne Creek from Goorimpa north to Brindangabba, Berawinna Downs, as far as the border with Queensland at Hungerford. Their land included Wanaaring and Yantabulla.

Running clockwise from the north, their neighbours were the Kalali and Badyuri, on their eastern flank were the Kurnu, the Naualko lay to their south, while the Wanjiwalku were on their western frontier, together, in the northwest, with the Karenggapa.

== Social organization and rites ==
The Paaruntyi had a two class system of marriage:

Primary divisions	Totems
Mukwara	eaglehawk (biliari); kanbgaroo (turlta); bilby (kurte); turkey (tickara); whistling duck (kultuppa); bandicoot (burkunia)
Kilpara	emu (kulthi); snake (turru); lizard (kami); wallaby(murinya); goanna (bu-una); native companion (kuntara)

The Paaruntyi rites of initiation involved neither circumcision nor subincision.

== Alternative names ==
- Paruindji
- Paruindi, Paruinji, Paroinge
- Barundji, Barungi, Barinji, Bahroonjee, Baroongee, Bahroongee, Barrengee
- Parooinge, Barunga

== Sources ==
- Bonney, Frederic (1884). "On Some Customs of the Aborigines of the River Darling, New South Wales". Journal of the Anthropological Institute of Great Britain and Ireland. 13: 122–137. doi:10.2307/2841717. JSTOR 2841717.
- Cameron, A. L. P. (1885). "Notes on Some Tribes of New South Wales". Journal of the Anthropological Institute of Great Britain and Ireland. 14: 344–370. doi:10.2307/2841627. JSTOR 2841627.
- Howitt, Alfred William (1904). The native tribes of south-east Australia (PDF). Macmillan.
- Mathews, R. H. (1898a). "Group divisions and initiation ceremonies of the Barkungee tribes". Journal of the Proceedings of the Royal Society of New South Wales. 32: 241–255. doi:10.5962/p.359301.
- Mathews, R. H. (January 1898b). "Initiation Ceremonies of Australian Tribes". Proceedings of the American Philosophical Society. 37 (157): 54–73. JSTOR 983694.
- Mathews, R. H. (December 1898c). "Divisions of Queensland Aborigines". Proceedings of the American Philosophical Society. 37 (158): 327–336. JSTOR 983859.
- Scrivener, G. (1886). "Lower Portions of the Paroo and Warrego Rivers" (PDF). In Curr, Edward Micklethwaite (ed.). The Australian race: its origin, languages, customs, place of landing in Australia and the routes by which it spread itself over the continent. Vol. 2. Melbourne: J. Ferres. pp. 182–186.
- Tindale, Norman Barnett (1974). "Parundji (NSW)". Aboriginal Tribes of Australia: Their Terrain, Environmental Controls, Distribution, Limits, and Proper Names. Australian National University Press. ISBN 978-0-708-10741-6.
