= Salisbury Downs Station =

Pastoral lease and sheep station in New South Wales

Coordinates: 29.9354°S 142.719°E

Location in New South Wales

Salisbury Station is a pastoral lease that operates as a sheep station in the outback of New South Wales.

It is located approximately 110 kilometres (68 mi) north of White Cliffs and 675 kilometres (419 mi) north east of Adelaide. The country is composed of sand dunes interspersed with clay pans. Areas of mulga are found on the property as are open downs of cottonbush and saltbush with areas of Queensland blue and Mitchell grasses. Stock can be watered by a large number of smaller ephemeral creeks and Altiboulka Lake, which receives floodwaters from the Bulloo River.

== History ==
Established at some time prior to 1881, it was owned by Lockhart Morton, with 1,000 ewes being stolen from the property the same year. Morton put the property on the market later the same year, the 432,000 acres (174,824 ha) along with adjoining blocks Paroo Plains and Monolon Peak Downs, which together had a total area of 812,000 acres (328,605 ha). The properties were stocked with 5,000 ewes and lambs, and included the homestead at Salisbury, kitchen, stores and some fencing.

A bore was sunk along a stock route on the station boundary with Yantara in 1895. The route was regarded as the driest in the country. The bore was the furthest to the west in the colony reached a depth of 1,500 feet (457 m) and produced 500,000 imperial gallons (2 ML) of water per day for stock.

The property occupied an area of over 1 million acres in 1901 and was managed by T. Welsh, who had been at the property for 16 years; the owner of the property was William Taylor.

Sidney Kidman acquired the property in 1914 along with nearby Bootra in 1915. Both stations were carrying sheep and cattle and were being managed from Bootra. By 1924 the area was being plagued by dingos; Salisbury had been carrying flocks of up to 80,000 sheep but since the pest arrived numbers had dropped substantially.

In 1936 the property occupied an area of 434,266 acres (175,741 ha) when it was sold by the estate of Sidney Kidman to Elsinore Limited.

== See also ==
- List of ranches and stations
