= Albert Goldfield =

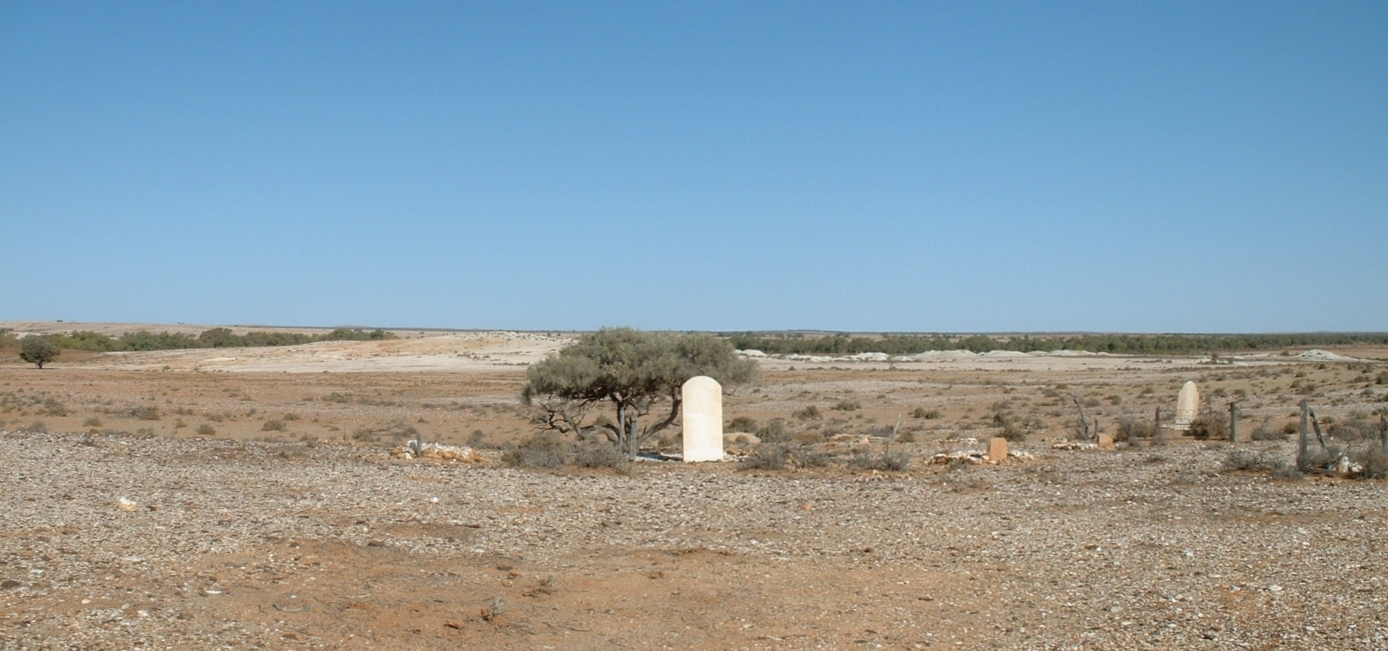
Cemetery at Mount Browne

The Albert Goldfield (or Albert mining district) is an area of 1300 square kilometres (500 square miles) in the outback of New South Wales where gold was discovered in 1880.

Gold was found at Mount Browne, which is 53 km (33 mi) south west of Tibooburra. There were other finds at Good Friday, Easter Monday, Nuggerty, Pioneer Reef and Warratta Creek.

The Albert Goldfield region is very hot and dry. Summer temperatures on the Gold field can reach 50 °C. Because of the shortage of water, towns were started at Milparinka and Tibooburra where there was water available. Towns at Albert and Mount Browne did not last for long because of the lack of water. By 1881 there were more than 2000 people living on the gold diggings or in the towns. Geologist W.H.J. Slee was appointed resident Goldfield Warden. There was no water in the mine area to use in separating the placer gold. Miners either took their dirt to one of the towns to use water to pan for the gold, or used a method called dry blowing, which is an adaptation of the agricultural technique of winnowing.

A contemporary description of the dry blowing process used at Mount Browne in 1881 states that miners there went to work with "a small broom made of twigs and a tin dish". A miner would use his broom to sweep dust and rock fragments from surface exposures of slate and collect it in the tin dish. Once his dish was "about half full of dirt", the miner would stand "with his back or side to the wind ... and begin throwing the stuff up and catching it, or sometimes slowly pouring it from one dish to another", allowing the wind to carry away the less dense particles, leaving the gold behind in the dish. This process required "very dry surface dirt." When "good sized nuggets" were found, they were removed from the dish before the remaining material was processed. If he saw smaller pieces of gold in the dish, the miner might use his own breath to blow the sand and dust away. The observer found the dry blowing process to be "both tedious and unhealthy."

Life on the goldfields was hard, water was scarce, fresh fruit and vegetables were unavailable, and basic commodities, such as flour, were very expensive. Disease, including cholera and typhoid, was common.

The village of Albert itself at its height had a population of 900. In June 1902 a large meteorite landed at nearby Mt Brown.

By 1893 the gold rush had ended and most people had left the goldfields.

An area of surviving ruins from the goldfield are listed on the New South Wales Heritage Register.
