= Karenggapa =

Aboriginal Australian people of western New South Wales

The Karenggapa are an Aboriginal Australian people of New South Wales.

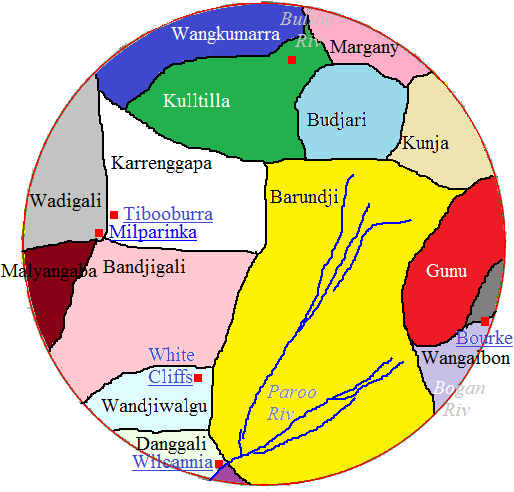
Karrenggapa traditional lands

== Country ==
Norman Tindale estimated the extent of their tribal lands at 14,000 square kilometres (5,500 sq mi), reaching from Mount Bygrave in northwestern New South Wales to Woodbum Lake in Queensland. They took in Tibooburra, at Yalpunga and Connulpie Downs, and included the Bulloo Lakes area. Their southwestern boundaries lay in the vicinity of Milparinka, while their eastern frontier ran along Therloo Downs.

== Social organisation and rites ==
The Karenggapa did not practice subincision, their initiation rites involving only circumcision.

== Language ==
They may have spoken a Yarli dialect. AUSTLANG has not given a confirmed status to a language of this name, saying that its identity is unclear; it may be either an alternative name or dialect of the Wangkumara language.

== Alternative names ==
- Karengappa
- Karrengappa
- Kurengappa

Source: Tindale 1974, p. 195

== Sources ==
- Mathews, R. H. (1898). "Group divisions and initiation ceremonies of the Barkungee tribes". Journal of the Proceedings of the Royal Society of New South Wales. 32: 241–255.
- Reid, James A. (1886). "Torrowotto" (PDF). In Curr, Edward Micklethwaite (ed.). The Australian race: its origin, languages, customs, place of landing in Australia and the routes by which it spread itself over the continent. Vol. 2. Melbourne: J. Ferres. pp. 178–181.
- Tindale, Norman Barnett (1974). "Karenggapa (NSW)". Aboriginal Tribes of Australia: Their Terrain, Environmental Controls, Distribution, Limits, and Proper Names. Australian National University Press. ISBN 978-0-708-10741-6.
