= Paroo River =

River in Queensland and New South Wales, Australia

Paroo Paroo Channel, Paroo River Channels
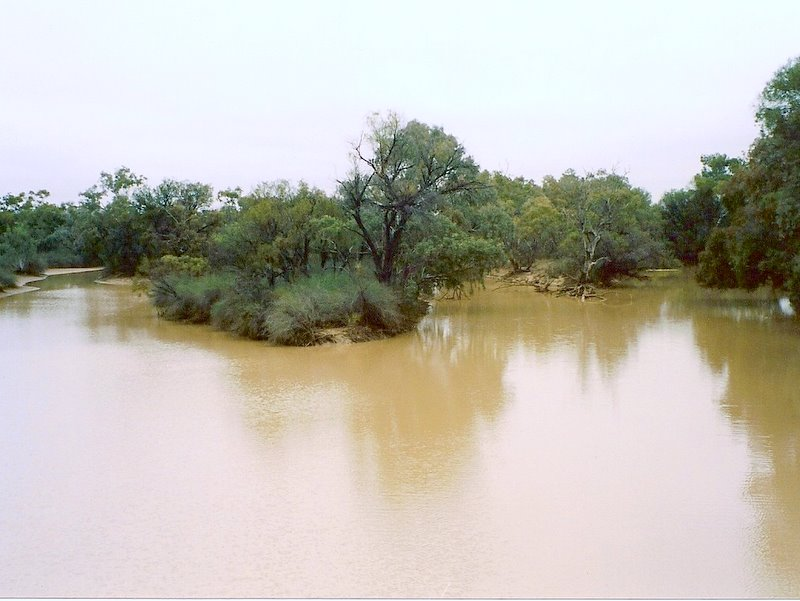
- Paroo River at Wanaaring, New South Wales

- Location of the Paroo River mouth in New South Wales

Location
- Country: Australia
- States: Queensland, New South Wales
- Region: South West Queensland, Far West, New South Wales

Physical characteristics
- Source: Mariala National Park
  - location: west of Augathella, Queensland
  - coordinates: 26°07′56″S 145°10′39″E
  - elevation: 336 m (1,102 ft)
- Mouth: confluence with the Darling River in wetter seasons
  - location: north of White Cliffs, New South Wales
  - coordinates: 31°33′30″S 143°27′08″E
  - elevation: 94 m (308 ft)
- Length: 1,210 km (750 mi)
- Basin size: 60,095 km^{2} (23,203 sq mi)
- Discharge
  - average: 15 m^{3}/s (530 cu ft/s)

Basin features
- River system: Darling River catchment, Murray–Darling basin
- Reservoirs: Buckenby Waterhole, Humeburn Waterhole, Corni Paroo Waterhole, Caiwarro Waterhole, Thoulcanna Dam, Talyealye Billabong and Budtha Waterhole

The Paroo River, a series of waterholes, connected in wet weather as a running stream of the Darling catchment within the Murray–Darling basin, is located in the South West region of Queensland and Far West region of New South Wales, Australia. It is the home of the Paarkantji people.

Paroo is the local Aboriginal word for the bony bream fish, which are common in the river.

== Course and features ==
The river rises in the gorge country of western Queensland south of the Mariala National Park, and flows generally south and spreads into the vast floodplains of New South Wales, eventually reaching the Paroo overflow lakes. Most commonly, the Paroo River terminates on the floodplain south of Wanaaring; and only reaches the Darling River in the wettest of years, otherwise spilling into the Paroo River Wetlands. The river is joined by forty-three minor tributaries; as it descends 242 metres (794 ft) over its 1,210-kilometre (750 mi) course.

The Paroo River is the last remaining free-flowing river in the northern part of the Murray-Darling basin, and is impounded by the natural formation of the Buckenby Waterhole, Humeburn Waterhole, Corni Paroo Waterhole, Caiwarro Waterhole, Thoulcanna Dam, Talyealye Billabong and Budtha Waterhole.

=== Wetlands ===
The Paroo River wetlands in north-western New South Wales are important for threatened species such as the freckled duck and the Australian painted snipe. The wetlands lie within the Paroo Floodplain and Currawinya Important Bird Area, identified as such by BirdLife International because of its importance, when conditions are suitable, for large numbers of waterbirds.

On 20 September 2007, Malcolm Turnbull, the Minister for the Environment and Water Resources, announced that the Paroo River Wetlands in north-west New South Wales would be listed under the Ramsar Convention as wetlands of international importance, making them Australia's 65th Ramsar site.

== Cultural references ==
Henry Lawson described the ephemeral nature of the Paroo River in a poem, "The Paroo 'River'" (1894):

But soon he saw a strip of ground
That crossed the track we followed—
No barer than the surface round
But just a little hollowed.

== Gallery ==
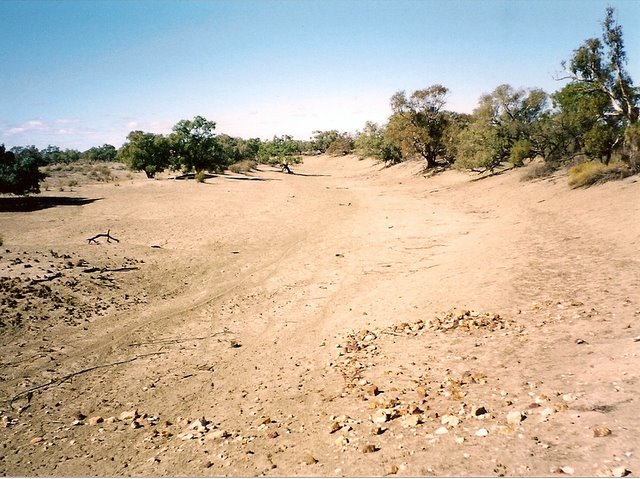
The dry Paroo River, near Wilcannia

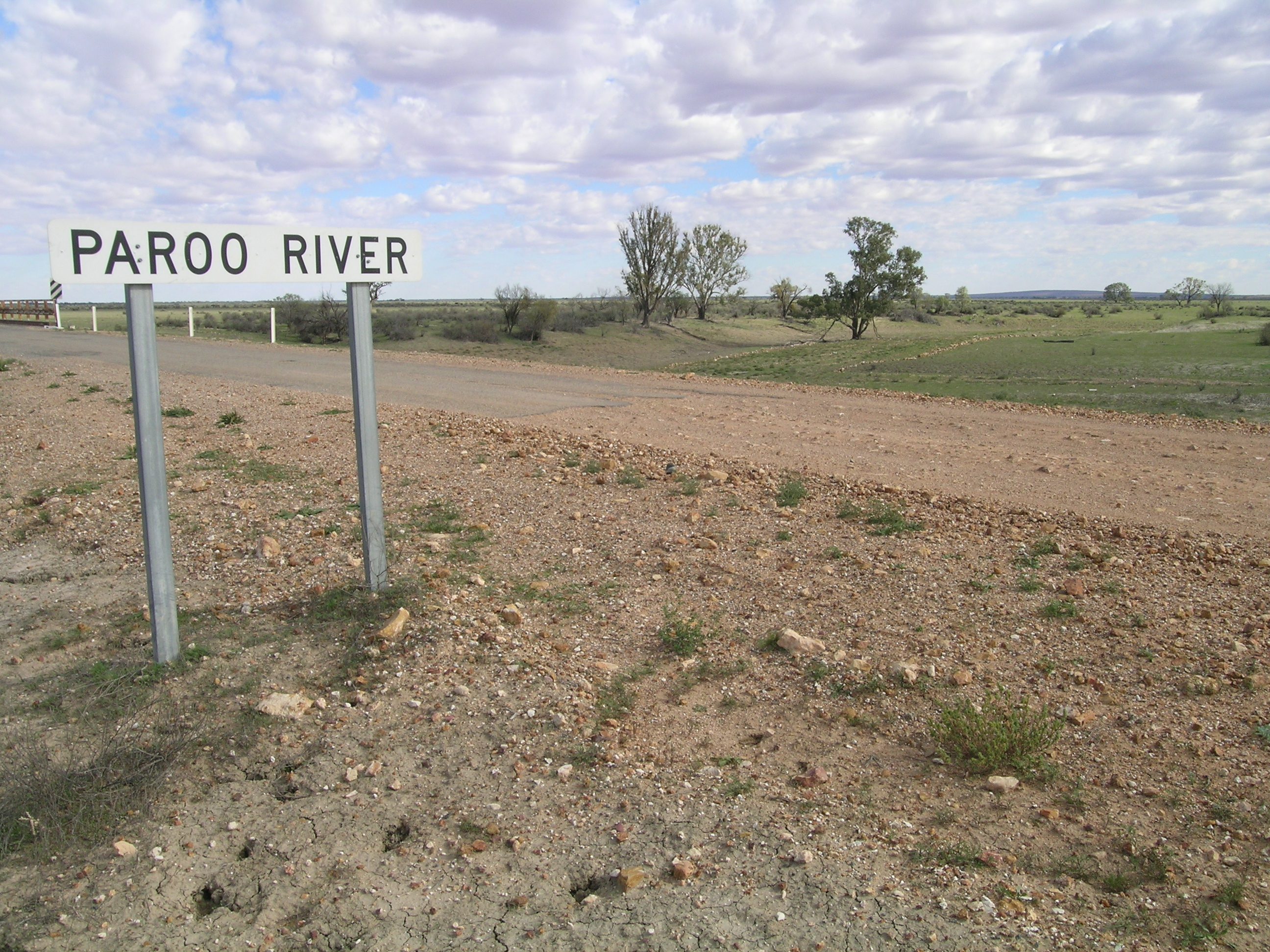
Road sign by the Paroo River bridge, near Wilcannia

== See also ==
- Rivers of Queensland
- Rivers of New South Wales
