= Wanaaring, New South Wales =

Wanaaring
- Town
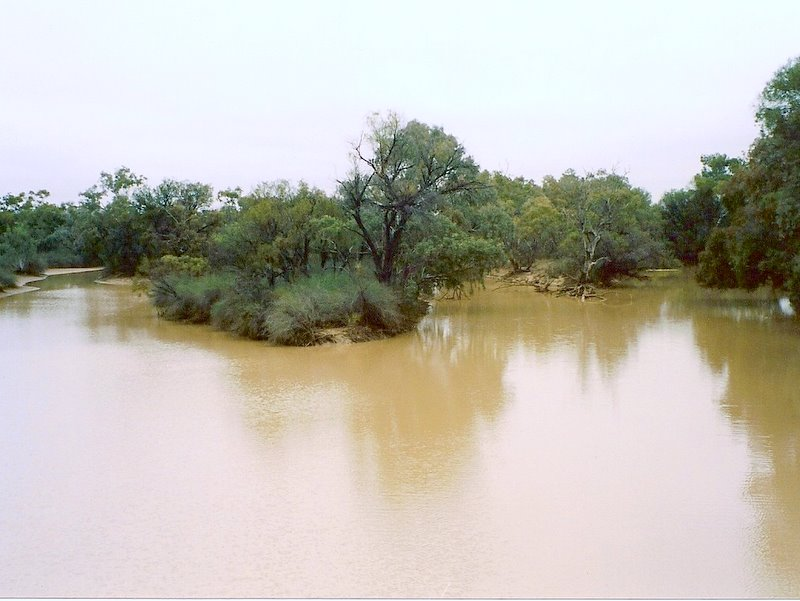
- Paroo River at Wanaaring

- Coordinates: 29°42′18″S 144°05′24″E
- Country: Australia
- State: New South Wales
- LGA: Bourke Shire

Government
  - State electorate: Barwon
  - Federal division: Parkes
- Elevation: 110 m (360 ft)

Population
  - Total: 81 (2021 census)
- Postcode: 2840
- Mean max temp: 28.0 °C (82.4 °F)
- Mean min temp: 12.9 °C (55.2 °F)
- Annual rainfall: 276 mm (10.9 in)

Wanaaring is a remote outback village in north western New South Wales, Australia. Situated on the Paroo River, some 980 kilometres from Sydney, and 180 km west of Bourke. At the 2021 census, Wanaaring had a population of 81.

Wanaaring is on the "Cut Line" road between the town of Bourke, and the desert village of Tibooburra. Long distance travellers often stop at Wanaaring for meals or to refuel.

Wanaaring is in outback Australia, in remote agricultural country. The grazing lands support cattle, sheep and goats. Honey is also produced. An all-weather air strip is located east of the village centre.

== Activities ==
Fishing and bush camping by the Paroo River. There is an annual gymkhana and rodeo, which supports the Royal Flying Doctor Service. The Flying Doctor provides essential medical aid to outback communities such as Wanaaring.

== History ==
Wanaaring is in the traditional lands of the Paaruntyi people who called the area Moukilimoultha. Pastoralist Vincent James Dowling conducted the first European survey of the region in 1860. In January 1862, George Curlewis and his associate McCullough were killed by local Aboriginal men while looking to take up land near to what is now Wanaaring. Explorer and early Paroo River colonist Duncan McIntyre located and buried their remains in 1864 after interviewing other Paaruntyi. Some colonists hunted and shot down the Paaruntyi people, while others utilised them as shepherds on the newly established pastoral properties.

William Malpass established the Paroo Inn at Wanaaring in 1867.

Wanaaring is believed to be the local Aboriginal word for a wood duck.

== Climate ==
The climate is semi-arid, featuring low rainfall, very hot summer temperatures and cool nights in winter. Wanaaring holds the Australian record for the highest minimum temperature, 36.6 °C recorded on 26 January 2019. A minimum temperature of -3.9 °C was recorded in July 1997.

Wanaaring

Climate chart (precipitation, max. and min. temperature)
J	F	M	A	M	J	J	A	S	O	N	D
35 37 22	34 35 21	26 33 17	16 28 13	24 23 9	20 19 6	18 19 4	15 21 5	14 26 9	20 29 13	25 32 17	29 35 20
- █ Average max. and min. temperatures in °C
- █ Precipitation totals in mm
Imperial conversion
J	F	M	A	M	J	J	A	S	O	N	D
1.4 99 72	1.3 95 70	1 91 63	0.6 82 55	0.9 73 48	0.8 66 43	0.7 66 39	0.6 70 41	0.6 79 48	0.8 84 55	1 90 63	1.1 95 68
- █ Average max. and min. temperatures in °F
- █ Precipitation totals in inches

Climate data for Wanaaring Post Office (108m elevation) 1991–2020
Month	Jan	Feb	Mar	Apr	May	Jun	Jul	Aug	Sep	Oct	Nov	Dec	Year
Record high °C (°F)	48.6 (119.5)	46.9 (116.4)	43.6 (110.5)	38.5 (101.3)	32.9 (91.2)	30.8 (87.4)	31.0 (87.8)	35.4 (95.7)	41.4 (106.5)	44.9 (112.8)	46.8 (116.2)	46.6 (115.9)	48.6 (119.5)
Mean daily maximum °C (°F)	37.3 (99.1)	35.6 (96.1)	32.7 (90.9)	28.2 (82.8)	22.8 (73.0)	19.1 (66.4)	19.0 (66.2)	21.4 (70.5)	25.7 (78.3)	29.7 (85.5)	32.9 (91.2)	35.4 (95.7)	28.3 (82.9)
Mean daily minimum °C (°F)	22.4 (72.3)	21.4 (70.5)	17.9 (64.2)	13.3 (55.9)	8.4 (47.1)	5.4 (41.7)	4.1 (39.4)	5.1 (41.2)	9.0 (48.2)	13.3 (55.9)	17.2 (63.0)	20.1 (68.2)	13.1 (55.6)
Record low °C (°F)	12.6 (54.7)	7.1 (44.8)	5.2 (41.4)	0.9 (33.6)	−2.4 (27.7)	−2.9 (26.8)	−4.3 (24.3)	−3.2 (26.2)	0.0 (32.0)	2.8 (37.0)	1.2 (34.2)	9.2 (48.6)	−4.3 (24.3)
Average rainfall mm (inches)	38.5 (1.52)	38.8 (1.53)	20.0 (0.79)	14.4 (0.57)	24.1 (0.95)	21.1 (0.83)	19.5 (0.77)	13.1 (0.52)	20.8 (0.82)	24.6 (0.97)	32.1 (1.26)	29.9 (1.18)	296.6 (11.68)
Average rainy days	4.7	3.9	3.6	2.1	4.4	5.4	4.7	3.0	3.6	4.3	5.0	4.2	48.9
Source: bom.gov.au
