= Parish of Wanpah =

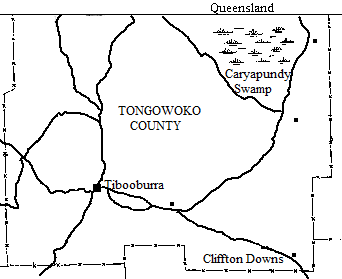
Map of Tongowoko County

Wanpah Parish is a civil land parish of Tongowoko County, New South Wales.

Wanpah together with Yalpunga Parish to its west once comprised the Onepar cattle leases. It is bordered on the east by Silva, and in the south by Torrens and Mount Wood.

Wanpah Creek is in the north of the parish, near the Queensland border. In his 1881 account, border surveyor John Cameron wrote "I engaged two fresh hands and continued the line west from Wanpah Creek knowing that there was no water between that creek and the South Australian boundary."
