= Parish of Bolwarry =

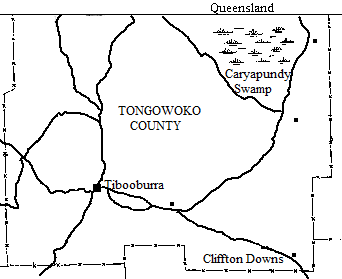
Map of Tongowoko County

Bolwarry, New South Wales is a civil parish of Tongowoko County, New South Wales. The parish is east of Tibooburra.

Located at 29°23'50.0"S 142°20'04.0"E, the parish is east of Tibooburra, and within the traditional lands of Yarli peoples. The landscape is flat and arid scrubland.

== Geography ==
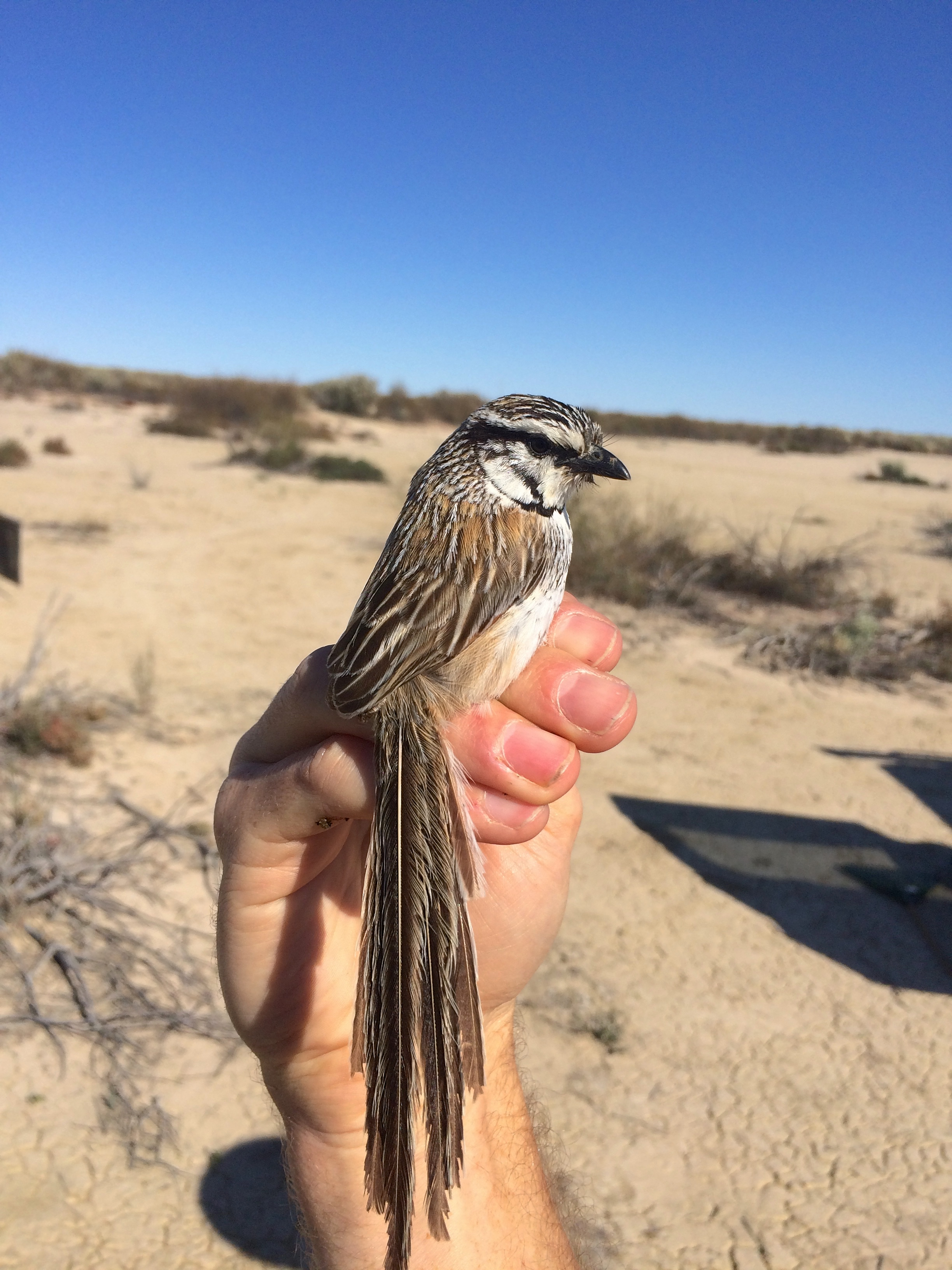
A Grey grasswren in Narriearra Caryapundy Swamp National Park (north-western New South Wales).

The topography of the parish is flat and arid, with a Köppen climate classification of BWh (Hot semi arid). The economy in the parish is based on broad acre agriculture, mainly cattle and sheep. The parish has no towns; the nearest settlement is Tibooburra, New South Wales.

Narriearra Caryapundy Swamp National Park is within the parish.

== History ==
The parish is on the traditional land of the Karrengappa people. The first Europeans to traverse the area were Burke and Wills, with Charles Sturt passing to the west.

The expansion of pastoralism in the second half of the 19th century saw the parish incorporated into the Caryapundy Station. In 1873, the area was described as being of [the] Burke and Wills track and well watered by the Bulloo River, Tongowoko, Torrens and other creeks. At the time, the area comprised grassed downs and saltbush country.

By 1892 the Caryapundy Station was in the hands of Sidney Kidman who moved 10,000 sheep and 1,000 head of cattle from the station, still owned by the Kidman Brothers in 1899, Sidney Kidman described it as one of the worst in New South Wales, the 54,200 acres (21,934 ha) might carry 230 cattle but no more, much of it is a claypan that will never carry feed.

In the 1890s, it was included in the Albert Goldfields.

The path of totality for the 25 November 2030 solar eclipse will pass over the parish.
