= Parish of Tongowoko =

Parish of Tongowoko may refer to either of two land parishes of New South Wales:

- Parish of Tongowoko, Delalah County
- Parish of Tongowoko, Tongowoko County
