= Parish of Tongowoko (Tongowoko County) =

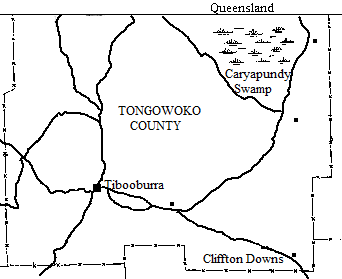
Map of Tongowoko County

Tongowoko Parish is a civil land parish of Tongowoko County, New South Wales. It is bordered by the parishes of Silva, Connulpie, Calathunda, and Caryapundy.
