= Parish of Caryapundy =

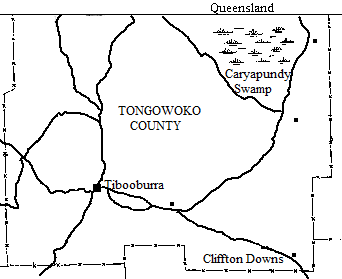
Map of Tongowoko County

Caryapundy Parish is a civil land parish of Tongowoko County, New South Wales, corresponding to the area of the former Caryapundy Station. It shares borders with Queensland, Tongowoko Parish, Calathunda Parish, and with Corriewelpie Parish of Delalah County (in the north, west, south, and east respectively).

== See also ==
- Narriearra Caryapundy Swamp National Park
- Caryapundy Station
