= Parish of Kooltoo =

Parish of Kooltoo, New South Wales is a remote civil parish of Yantara County in far North West New South Wales. The geography of the parish is mostly the flat, arid landscape of the Channel Country. The parish has a Köppen climate classification of BWh (Hot desert).

The nearest town is Tibooburra to the northwest, which is on the Silver City Highway and lies south of Sturt National Park.

The area around Wonominta Creek is almost unpopulated, with less than two inhabitants per square kilometre.

== Climate ==
The landscape is flat, arid desert with a hot desert climate. The annual average temperature is 23 °C. The warmest month is January, when the average temperature is 34 °C, and the coldest is June, at 10 °C. The average annual average is 306 millimetres. The rainy month is February, with an average of 109 mm rainfall, and the driest is October, with 1 mm rainfall.

== History ==
The Parish is on the traditional lands of the BandjigaliAboriginal peoples.

In 1861 the Burke and Wills expedition passed through the area.
