= Parish of Connulpie =

Local government in Australia

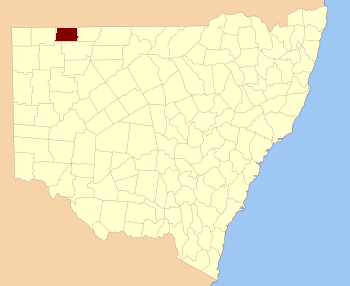
Delalah County

Connulpie, New South Wales is a remote civil Parish, of the County of Delalah a cadasteral division of New South Wales.

== Geography ==
The topography of Connulpie, is the flat arid landscape of the Channel County with a Köppen climate classification of BWh (Hot semi arid). There are no towns in the parish and the nearest settlement is Tibooburra, New South Wales and Hungerford, Queensland.

== Economy ==
The economy in the parish has previously been based on broad acre agriculture, mainly cattle, and sheep.

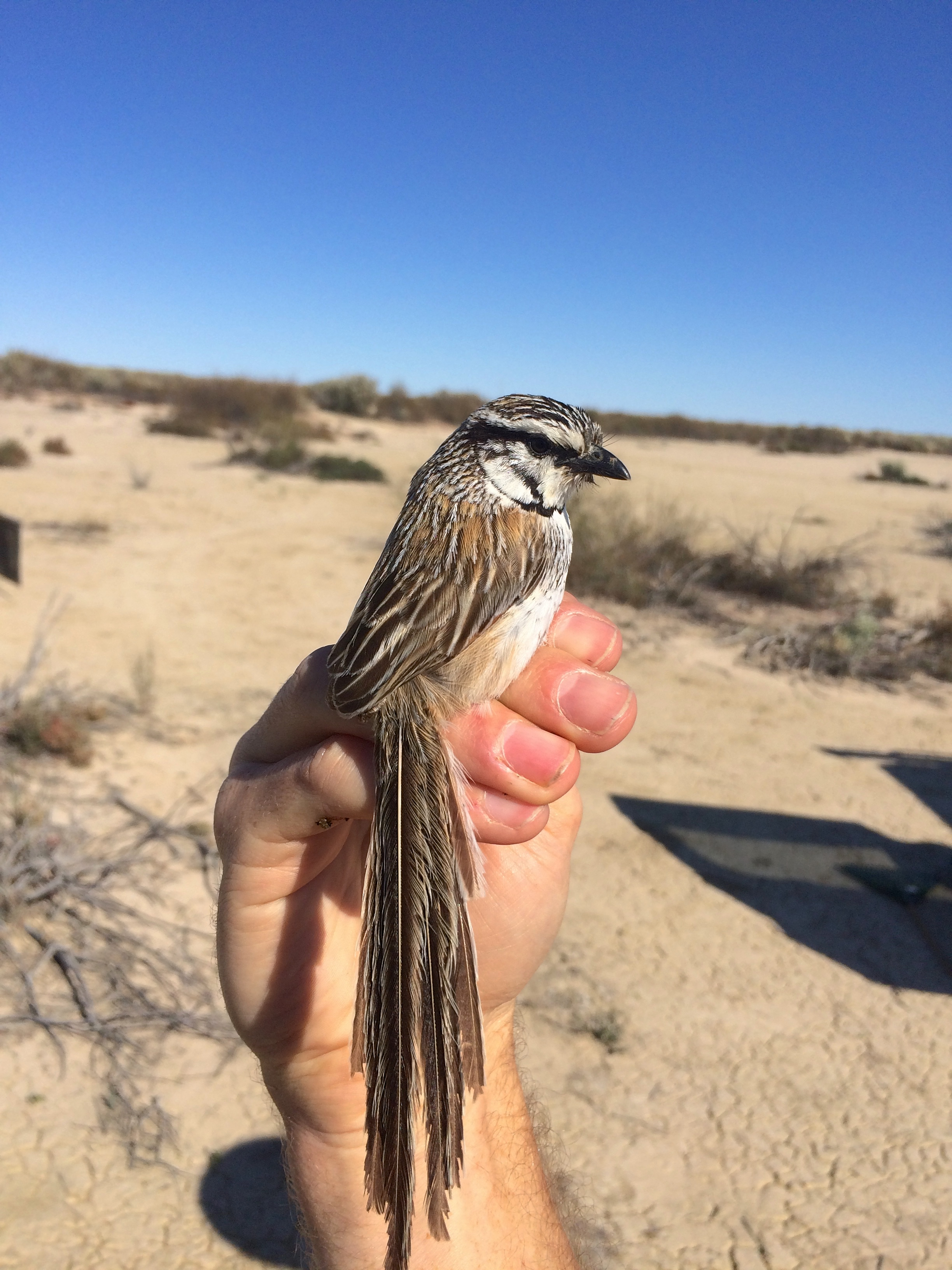
A Grey grasswren in Narriearra Caryapundy Swamp National Park (north-western New South Wales).

Narriearra Caryapundy Swamp National Park is within the north west corner of the parish.

== History ==
The parish is on the traditional land of the Karrengappa people. The first Europeans through the area were Burke and Wills and in the 1890s was included in the Albert Goldfield.

In 1873 the area was described as "being of [the] Burke and Wills track and well watered by the Bulloo River, Tongowoko, Torrens and other creeks." At the time the area was made up of grassed downs and saltbush country.

By 1892 the property was owned by Sidney Kidman who moved 10,000 sheep and 1,000 head of cattle from the station, still owned by the Kidman Brothers in 1899. Kidman described it as "one of the worst in New South Wales, the 54,200 acres (21,934 ha) might carry 230 cattle but no more, much of it is a claypan that will never carry feed".

== See also ==
- Caryapundy Station
