= Parish of Whyjonta =

Parish of Yantara County

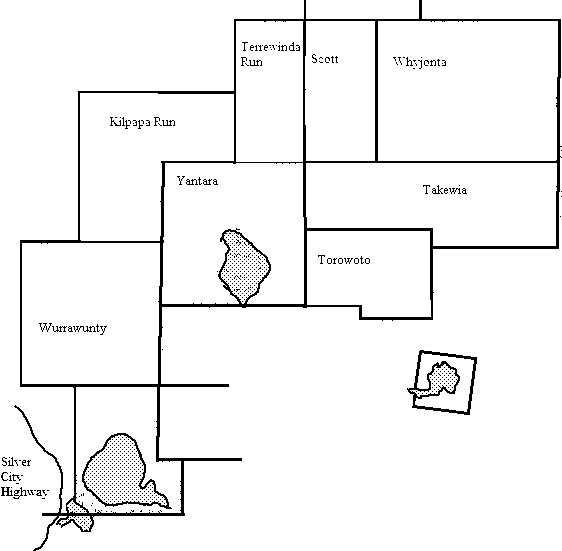
Map of the area around Salt Lake Tantara County New South Wales

Whyjonta is a parish of Yantara County in far north west New South Wales.

== Location ==
Whyjonta is located at 29° 41' 00" S 142° 28' 00" E and is located on the Cut Line a section of the unsealed road between Tibooburra and Wanaaring. and is between Pindera Downs Aboriginal Area and Malparinka. The parish has a Köppen climate classification of BWh (Hot desert). The nearest town is White Cliffs, which is 140 km away.

Whyjonta is also on the Two Mile Creek in northwest New South Wales. Adelaide is its closest capital city 690 km to the south-southwest. Whyjonta is 85m above sea level.

== History ==
The parish is on the traditional lands of Yarli speaking peoples, notably the Wadigali Aboriginal peoples.

Charles Sturt passed by the parish during 1845, camping for six months at Preservation Creek some miles to the north.

In 1861 the Burke and Wills expedition passed to the east, and Gold was discovered to the north in the 1870s.
