= Parish of Woombup =

Woombup is a remote civil parish of Yantara County in far North West New South Wales, located at 30°12′49″S 142°32′44″E.

The Geography, of the parish is mostly the flat, arid landscape of the Channel Country. The parish has a Köppen climate classification of BWh (Hot desert).

The nearest town is Tibooburra to the north west, which is on the Silver City Highway and lies south of the Sturt National Park.
