= Parish of Warratta =

Cadastral parish in New South Wales, Australia

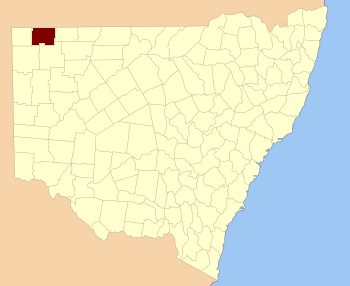
Tongowoko NSW.

Warratta, New South Wales is a cadastral parish of Tongowoko County New South Wales.

== Geography ==
Warratta is located at 29°34′54″S 141°51′08″E between Tibooburra and Milparinka where the Silver City Highway crosses Warratta Creek. The Geography, of the parish is mostly the flat, arid landscape of the Channel Country. The parish has a Köppen climate classification of BWh (Hot desert). The county is barely inhabited with a population density of less than 1 person per 150 km^{2} and the landscape is a flat arid scrubland.
