= Parish of Wunawunty =

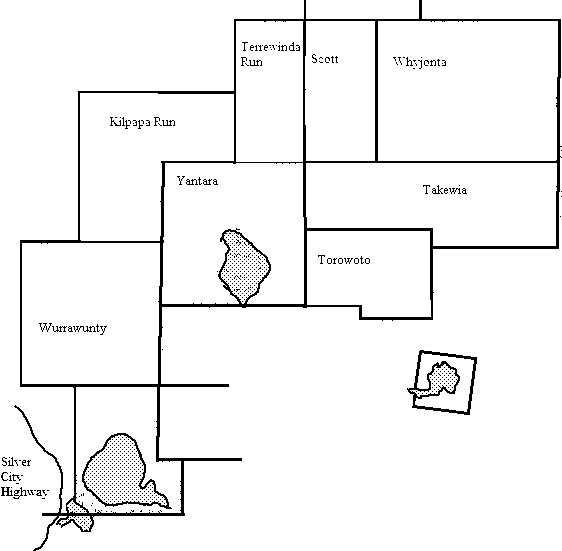
Map of the area around Salt Lake Tantara County New South Wales

Wunawunty is a remote civil parish of Yantara County in far northwest New South Wales. Located at 29°59′37″S 142°06′40″E, east of the Silver City Highway.

The geography of the parish is mostly the flat, arid landscape of the Channel Country. The parish has a Köppen climate classification of BWh (Hot desert).

The nearest town is Tibooburra to the north west, which is on the Silver City Highway and lies south of the Sturt National Park.
