= Parish of Koonyaboothie =

Cadastral parish in New South Wales, Australia

Coordinates: 29°36′59″S 142°23′17″E

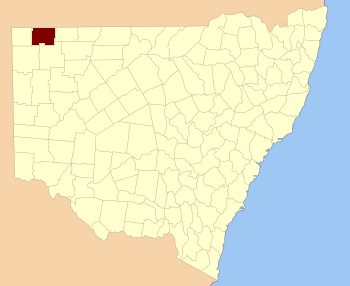
Tongowoko NSW.

Koonyaboothie located between Pindera Downs Aboriginal Area and Tibooburra is a cadastral parish of Tongowoko County in New South Wales, Australia.

The Geography, of the parish is mostly the flat, arid landscape of the Channel Country. The parish has a Köppen climate classification of BWh (Hot desert).

The nearest town is Tibooburra
