= Parish of Buona =

Civil Parish in New South Wales, Australia

Buona is a remote civil parish of Yantara County in far northwest New South Wales, Australia.

The geography of the parish is mostly the flat, and very arid landscape of the Channel Country. The parish has a Köppen climate classification of BWh (Hot desert). The nearest town is Tibooburra to the northwest, which is on the Silver City Highway.
