= Parish of Torrens =

Torrens Parish
- Coordinates: 29°25′59″S 142°00′29″E
- Country: Australia
- State: New South Wales
- LGA: Unincorporated Far West Region
- Location: 1,187 km (738 mi) NW of Sydney; 843 km (524 mi) N of Adelaide; 335 km (208 mi) N of Broken Hill

Government
  - State electorate: Barwon
  - Federal division: Parkes
- Elevation: 183 m (600 ft)
- Postcode: 2880
- County: Tongowoko
- Mean max temp: 27.4 °C (81.3 °F)
- Mean min temp: 13.9 °C (57.0 °F)
- Annual rainfall: 230.5 mm (9.07 in)

Torrens Parish, New South Wales located at 29°14′00″S 142°09′27″E is a rural locality in and a cadastral parish of Tongowoko County, two kilometers north east from the town of Tibooburra, New South Wales. The parish is north east of Tibooburra, within the Sturt National Park.

== Geography ==
The geography is typical of the flat, arid landscape of the Channel Country. The Geography, of the parish is mostly the flat, arid landscape of the Channel Country. The parish has a Köppen climate classification of BWh (Hot desert). The parish is barely inhabited with a population density of less than 1 person per 150 km^{2} and the landscape is a flat arid scrubland.

The Parish is on the traditional Lands of the Yarli people, and is named for the Torrens Creek Run, a pastoral station between the town of Tibooburra, New South Wales and Mount Wood Station.

The path of totality for the solar eclipse in November 2030 and October 2042 will pass over the parish.
