= Parish of Binaroo =

Parish in New South Wales

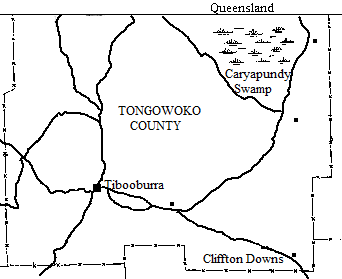
Map of Tongowoko County

Binaroo is a civil parish of Tongowoko County, New South wales. The parish is east of Tibooburra.

Located at 29°23'50.0"S 142°20'04.0"E, the parish is on the white well Creek east of Tibooburra, and within the traditional lands of Yarli peoples. The landscape is flat and arid scrubland.

The Geography, of the parish is mostly the flat, arid landscape of the Channel Country. The parish has a Köppen climate classification of BWh (Hot desert).

The nearest town is Tibooburra
