= Parish of Mount Stuart =

Mount Stuart New South Wales
- Coordinates: 29°25′59″S 142°00′29″E
- Postcode(s): 2880
- Elevation: 183 m (600 ft)
- Location: 1,187 km (738 mi) NW of Sydney; 843 km (524 mi) N of Adelaide; 335 km (208 mi) N of Broken Hill
- LGA(s): Unincorporated Far West Region
- Region: Channel Country
- County: Tongowoko
- State electorate(s): Barwon
- Federal division(s): Parkes
Mean max temp	Mean min temp	Annual rainfall
27.4 °C; 81 °F	13.9 °C; 57 °F	230.5 mm 9.1 in

Mount Stuart located at 29°30'32.0"S 142°01'08.0"E is a civil parish of Tongowoko County, on the opposite bank of the Thomson Creek from the town of Tibooburra. The parish is east of Tibooburra.

The geography of the parish is mostly the flat, arid landscape of the Channel Country. The parish has a Köppen climate classification of BWh (Hot desert).
