= Parish of Kilpara =

Kilpara, New South Wales is a remote civil parish of Yantara County in far North West New South Wales, Australia. The Geography, of the parish is mostly the flat, arid landscape of the Channel Country. The parish has a Köppen climate classification of BWh (Hot desert).

The Parish located at 29°45′18″S 142°11′14″E on the Cut Line Road east of Milparinka is located between Tarawonda, Stumpy Tail and Warratta Creeks.

The nearest town is Tibooburra to the north west, which is on the Silver City Highway and lies south of the Sturt National Park.
