= Parish of Whittabranah =

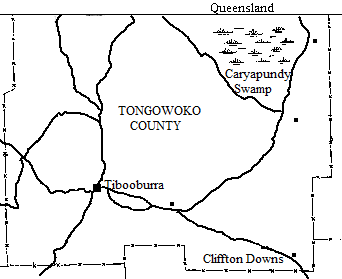
Map of Tongowoko County

Whittabranah is a civil parish of Tongowoko County, New South Wales, Australia. The parish is 5 miles north of Tibooburra.

Located at 29.208611°S 142.019444°E, the parish is on the Silver City Highway north of Tibooburra and within the traditional lands of Yarli peoples. The landscape, being within the Channel Country, is flat and arid scrubland.

== History ==
The parish is named for Whitta Brinnah Cattle Station, one of seven former cattle stations now in Sturt National Park located in the north western corner of New South Wales. Whitta Brinnah Cattle Station is located at 29º 23' 14.03" S 142º 01' 26.63" E, on the Silver City Highway north of Tibooburra.

Whitta Brinnah property has been acquired and managed as park since 1976, but was not officially reserved until the expiry of mineral interests in 2003.

== Geography ==
The geography of the parish is mostly the flat, arid landscape of the Channel Country. The parish has a Köppen climate classification of BWh (Hot desert). The county is barely inhabited with a population density of less than 1 per 150 square kilometres (58 sq mi) and the landscape is a flat arid scrubland.
