= Parish of Kurawillia =

Kurawillia located at 29°36′59″S 142°34′32″E is a cadastral parish of Tokowoko County New South Wales. The parish is east of Tibooburra, and within the traditional lands of Yarli peoples. The landscape is flat and arid scrubland.

The geography of the parish is mostly the flat, arid landscape of the Channel Country. The parish has a Köppen climate classification of BWh (Hot desert).

The nearest town is Tibooburra.
