= Parish of Tooncurrie =

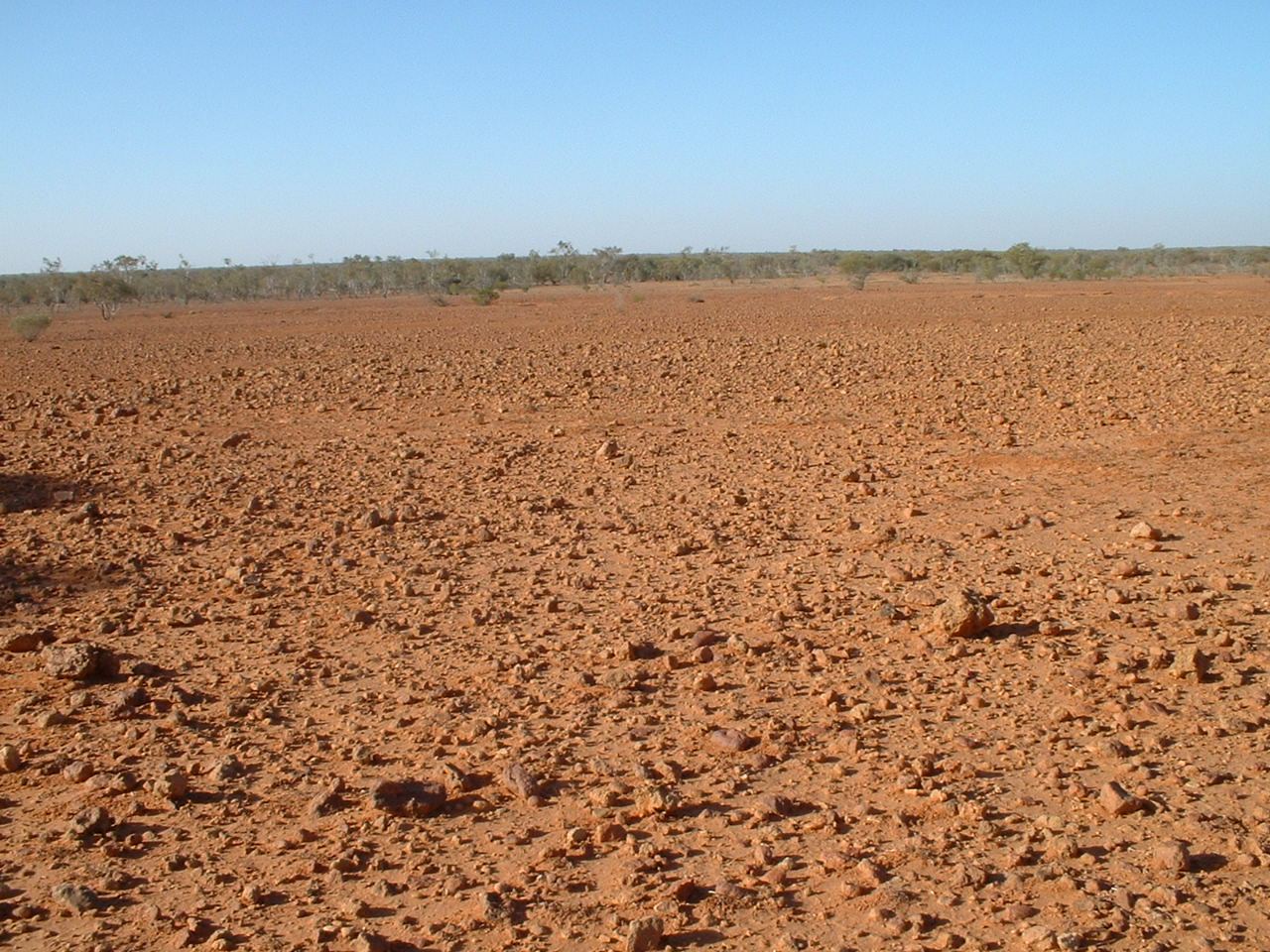
landscape near Tooncurrie

Tooncurrie Parish located at 29°31′44″S 142°13′52″E just east of Tibooburra, New South Wales is a cadastral parish of Tongowoko County New South Wales. The town of Tibooburrais just outside the parish.

== Geography ==
The Geography, of the parish is mostly the flat, arid landscape of the Channel Country. The parish has a Köppen climate classification of BWh (Hot desert). The County is barely inhabited with a population density of less than 1 person per 150 km² and the landscape is a flat arid scrubland.

Gold was found in the area in the 1870 but today the parish is just inside the Sturt National Park. Water scarcity has always been a problem to habitation.

Other than Sturt National Park, the main feature of the parish is Tibooburra airport.

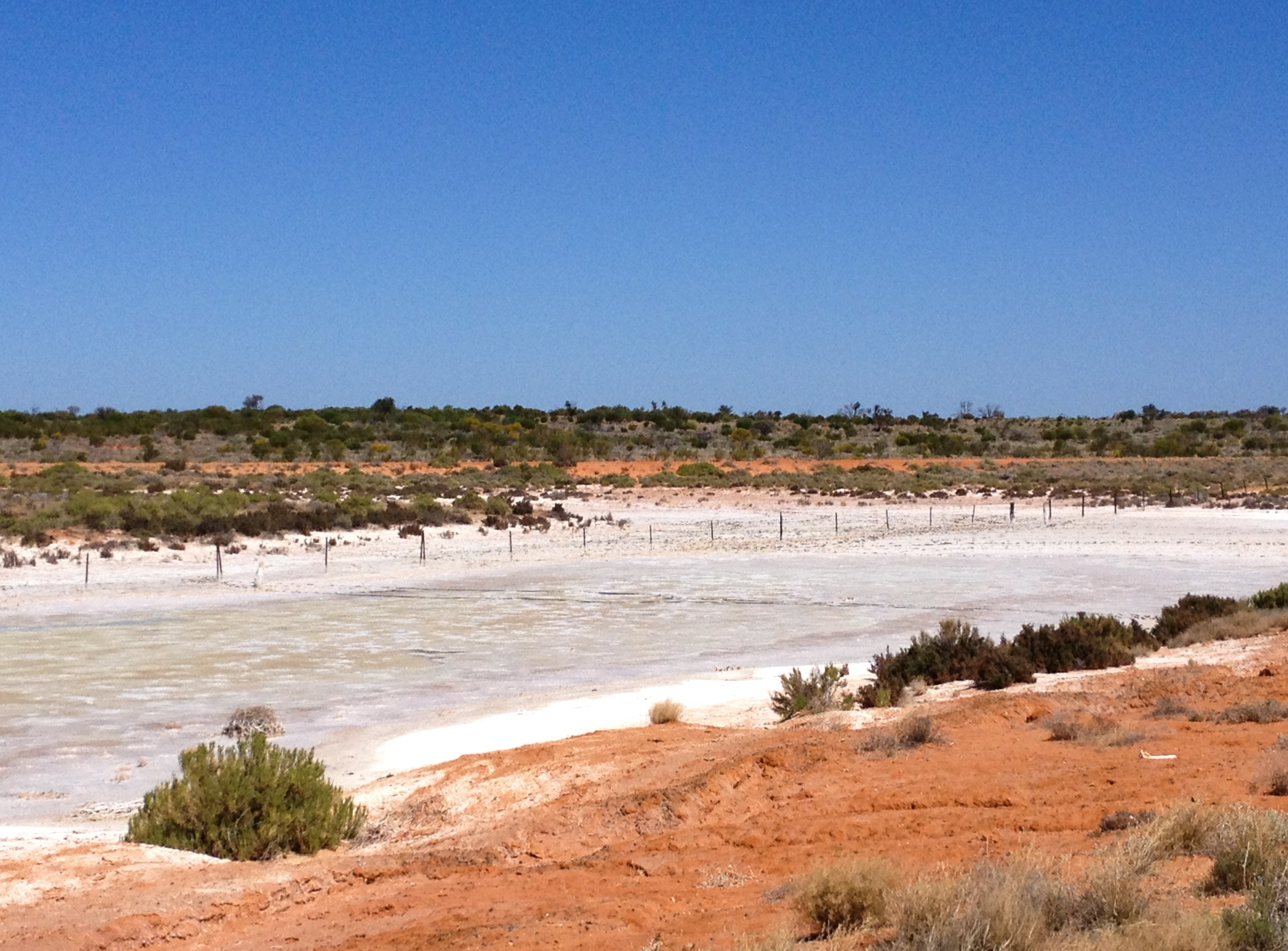
Landscape of Tongawoko County near Tooncurrie Parish

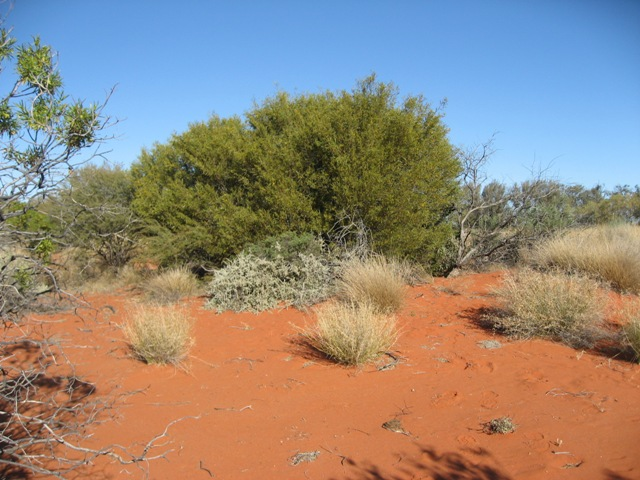
Landscape in the parish adjoining Tooncurry.
