= Parish of Hermitage =

Hermitage Parish New South Wales
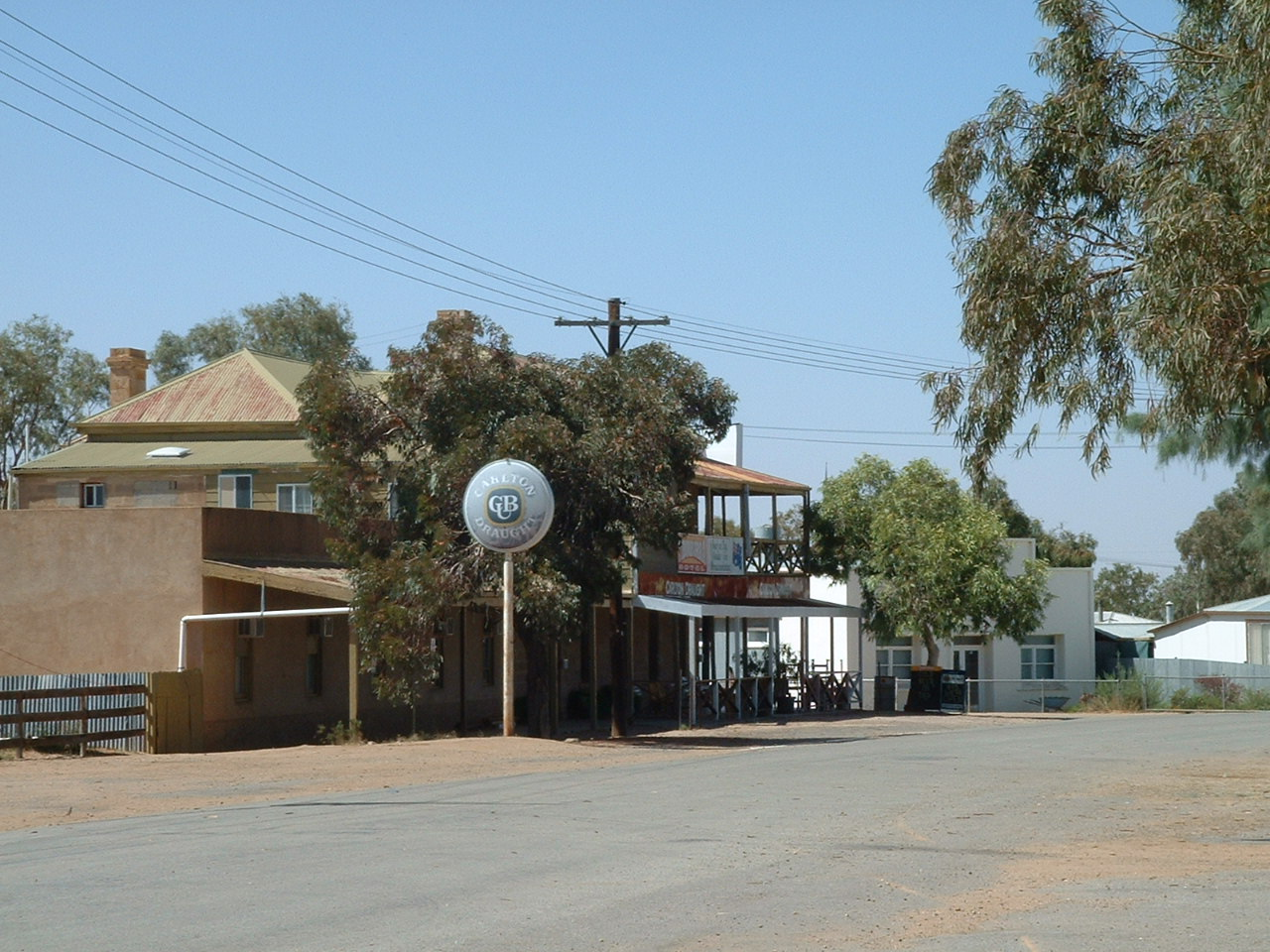
- Main street of Tibooburra in Hermitage Parish, looking towards the two storey hotel

- Coordinates: 29°25′59″S 142°00′29″E
- Postcode(s): 2880
- Elevation: 183 m (600 ft)
- Location: 1,187 km (738 mi) NW of Sydney; 843 km (524 mi) N of Adelaide; 335 km (208 mi) N of Broken Hill
- LGA(s): Unincorporated Far West Region
- Region: Channel Country
- County: Tongowoko
- State electorate(s): Barwon
- Federal division(s): Parkes
Mean max temp	Mean min temp	Annual rainfall
27.4 °C; 81 °F	13.9 °C; 57 °F	230.5 mm 9.1 in

Hermitage, New South wales, is a civil parish of Tongowoko County, New South Wales. The town of Tibooburra is the only settlement in the parish.

Located at 29°22′57″S 142°01′09″E, the parish is on the traditional lands of Yarli peoples. The Geography, of the parish is mostly the flat, arid landscape of the Channel Country. The parish has a Köppen climate classification of BWh (Hot desert).

The nearest town is Tibooburra
