= Parish of Olive =

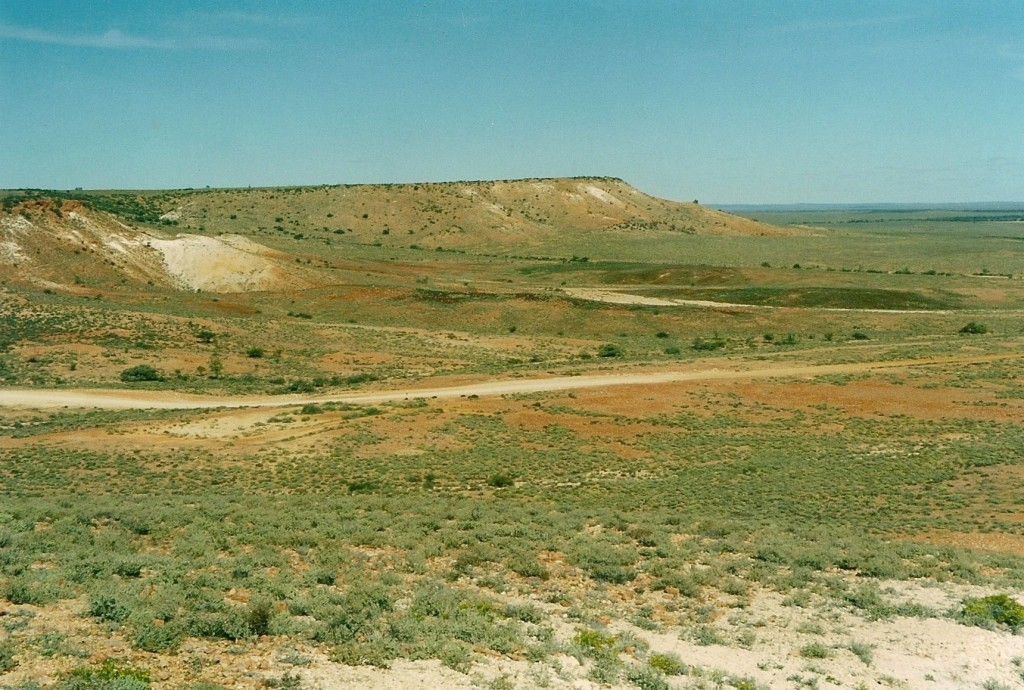
Landscape around Olive

Olive, also known as Olive Downs, is a civil parish of Tongowoko County in far north west New South Wales, located at 29°02′40″S 141°52′14″E.

== Geography ==
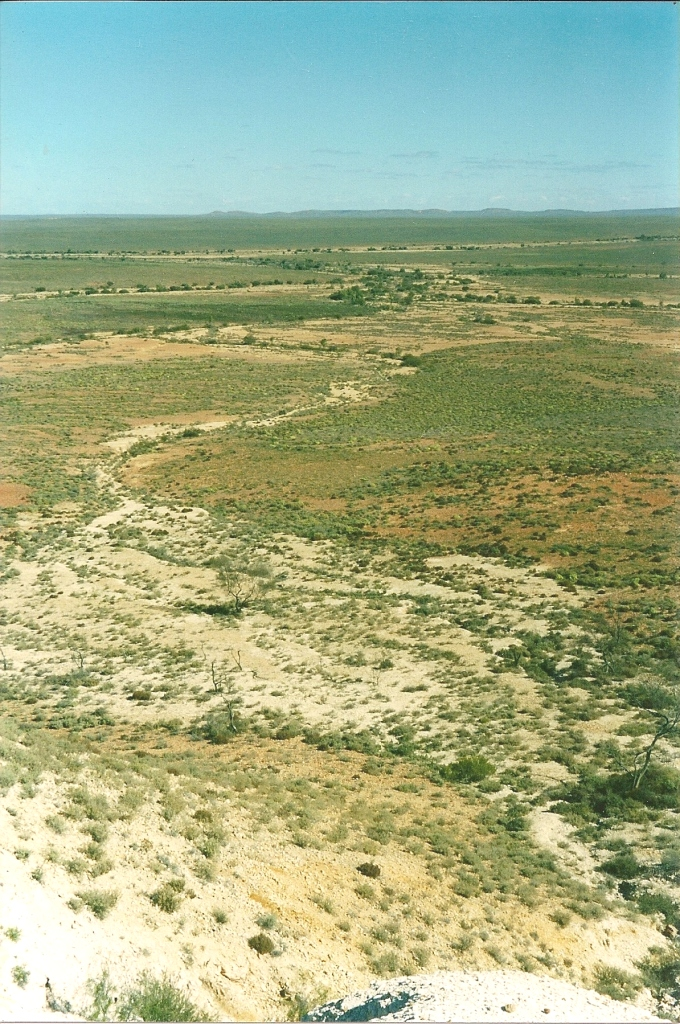
A dry creek bed seen from the cliff face near Olive Downs Station

The geography of Olive Parish is mostly the flat, arid landscape of the Channel Country but includes a series of mesa known as the Jump ups.

The parish is on the Silver City Highway and lies within the Sturt National Park.

The Queensland-New South Wales border forms the northern boundary of the parish, which is marked by the Dingo Fence.

The parish has a Köppen climate classification of BWh (Hot desert).

== History ==
The parish is on the traditional lands of the Yarli people.

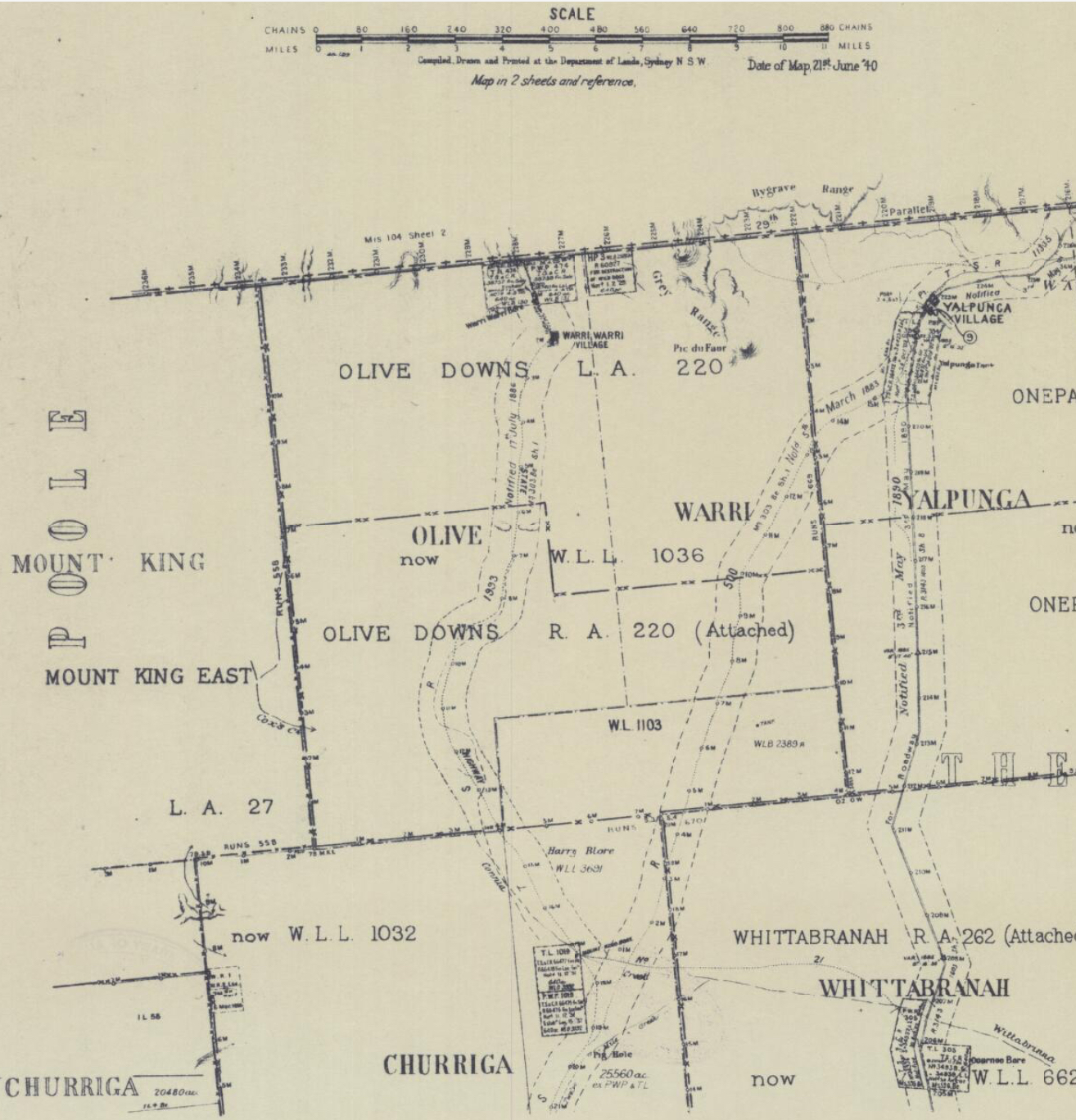
Parishes of Olive and Warri, and Olive Downs pastoral leases, 1940

The parish is named for Olive Downs Station, a cattle run of 92,000 acres established between 1884 and 1886. The first recorded owners were Charles Murray and William Sanderson in 1889 but the property changed hands a number of times and grew in area to become 512,000 acres by 1912. In 1924 an adjoining property in Queensland was added to the run.

In 1924 or 1927 it became part of Sidney Kidman’s pastoral empire. It has been said that Kidman controlled a third of the West Darling region by 1920. Olive Downs Station ran huge flocks of sheep in its early days but by 1927–1932 these were dramatically reduced to an average of 12,172 head of sheep. - Draft Plan of Management Sturt National Park

Sturt National Park was established in 1972, and today the entire parish is within the park.
