= Parish of Uncana =

Uncana is a remote rural locality and civil parish of Yantara County in far North West New South Wales. The Geography, of the parish is mostly the flat, arid landscape of the Channel Country.

The nearest town is Tibooburra to the north west, which is on the Silver City Highway and lies south of the Sturt National Park.
