= Parish of Calathunda =

Civil parish in New South Wales

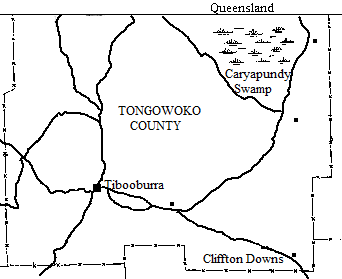
Map of Tongowoko County

Calathunda is a remote civil parish of Tongowoko County, in New South Wales. The parish is north east of Tibooburra.

== Geography ==
Located at 29°17'01.0"S 142°37'25.0"E, the parish is on the Twelve Miles Creek north east of Tibooburra, and near Pindera Downs Aboriginal Area. The parish is within the traditional lands of Yarli peoples.

The Geography, of the parish is mostly the flat, arid landscape of the Channel Country. The parish has a Köppen climate classification of BWh (Hot desert).

The nearest town is Tibooburra
