= Parish of Yalpunga =

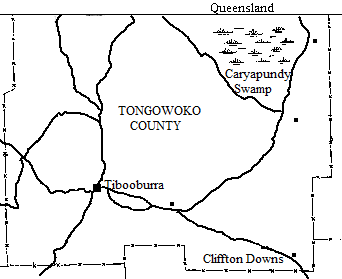
Map of Tongowoko County

Yalpunga located at 29°02′40″S 142°03′13″E is a civil parish of Tongowoko County, New South Wales.

== Geography ==
Yalpunga is on the Queensland border and on the Yalpunga and wanpah creeks. Yalpunga's is also on the Silver City Highway, 13.5 miles from Sturt National Park, and 46 km from Tibooburra. The parish has a Köppen climate classification of BWh (Hot desert). The county is barely inhabited with a population density of less than 1 person per 150 km^{2} and the landscape is a flat arid scrubland.

The Dingo Fence passes through the parish, which being in the Channel Country is flat arid scrubland.

== History ==
A town was planned for Yalpunga in 1893, but it never developed.

The path of totality for the solar eclipse in November 2030 and October 2042 will pass over the parish.
