= Parish of Warri =

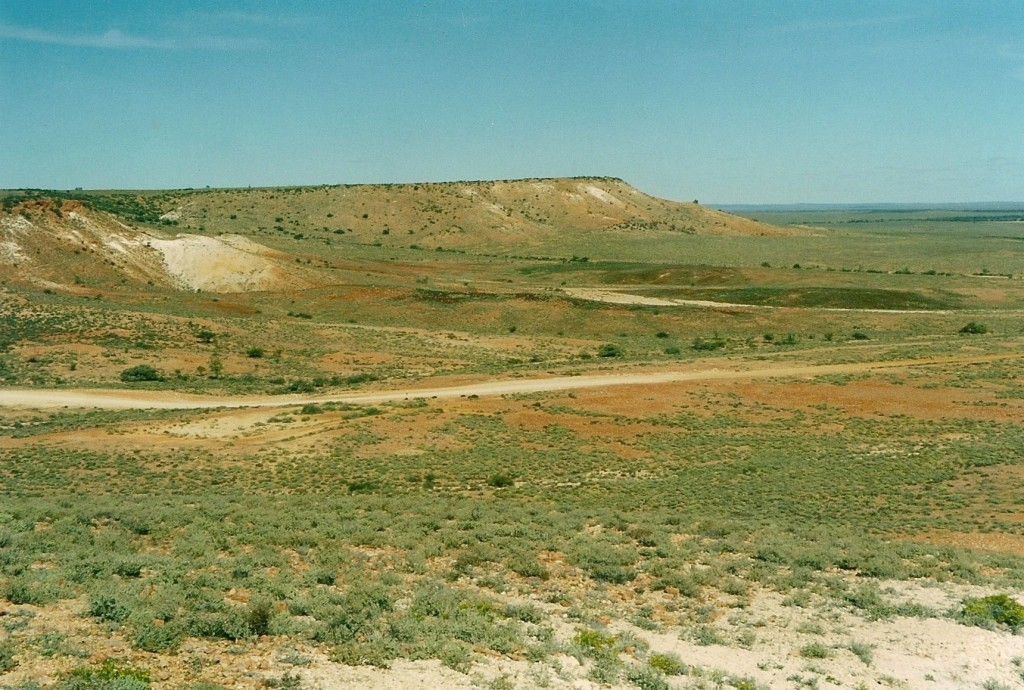
Landscape near Warri at Olive Downs.

Warri Parish located at 29.035833°S 141.965278°E is a cadastral parish of Tongowoko County New South Wales.

The Parish of Warri is located on the Silver City Highway where it crosses the Queensland border. The topography is flat and arid, typical of the Channel Country and the northern boundary of the Parish carries the Dingo Fence.

The parish has a Köppen climate classification of BWh (Hot desert). The county is barely inhabited with a population density of less than 1 person per 150 km^{2} and the landscape is a flat arid scrubland.

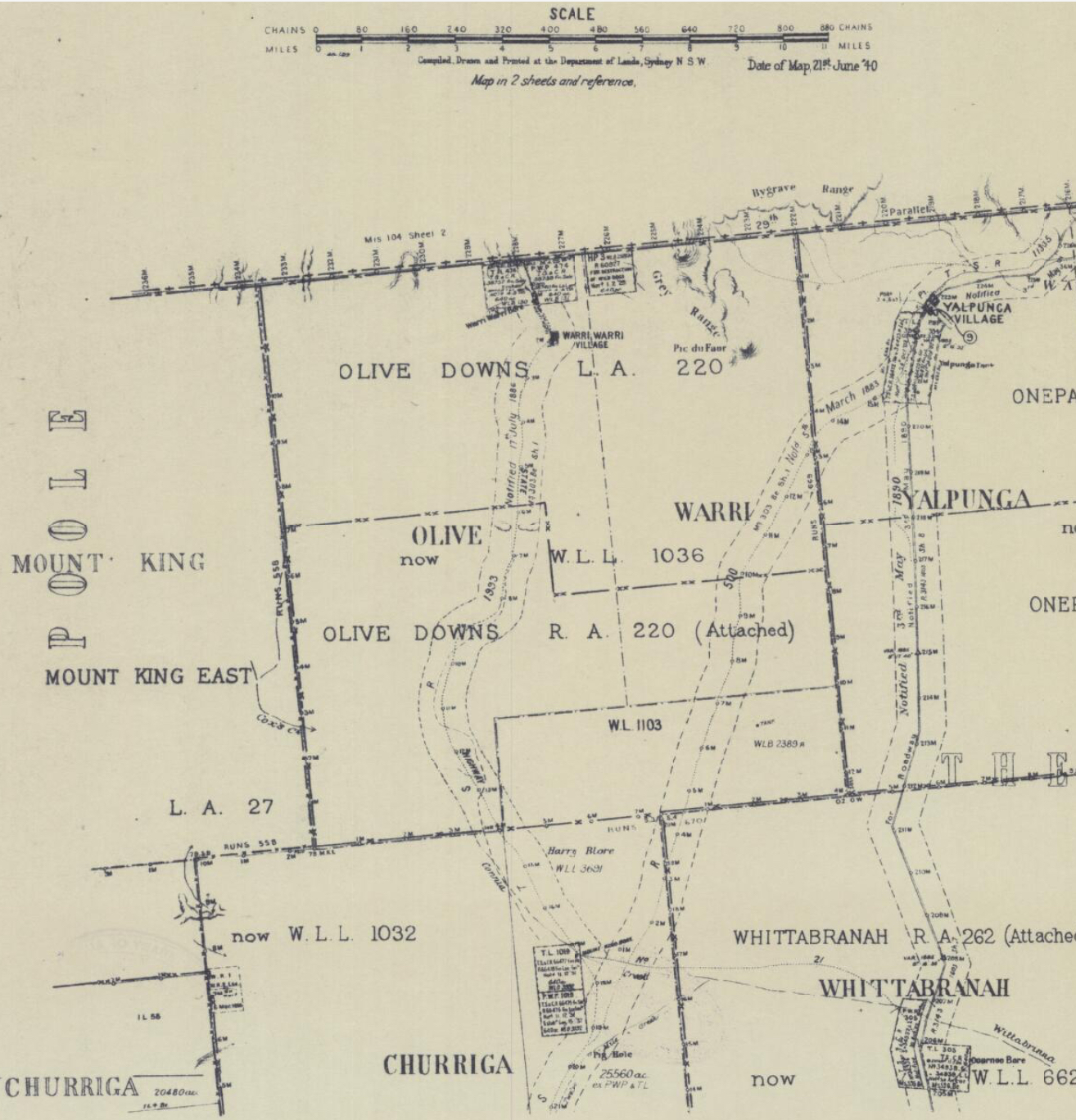
Parishes of Olive and Warri, and Olive Downs pastoral leases, 1940
