= Parish of Kootooloomondoo =

Kootooloomondoo, New South Wales, located at 30.078611°S 142.956111°E is a Parish of Yantara County in north west New South Wales. It is between Milparinka, New South Wales and Wilcannia The main economic activity of the parish is agriculture, the Salisbury Downs Station is nearby.

== History ==
The Parish is in the traditional lands of the Bandjigali and Karenggapa people. The Burke and Wills expedition were the first Europeans to the area.

== Geography ==
The parish has a Köppen climate classification of BWh (Hot desert).

The path of totality for the solar eclipse in November 2030 and October 2042 will pass over the parish.
