= Parish of Yanderra =

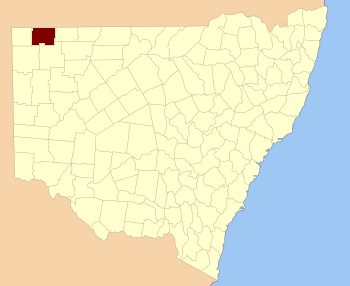
Tongowoko County

Yanderra parish is a cadastral parish of Tongowoko County New South Wales.

== Geography ==
It is located at 29.343333°S 142.581944°E on the Twelve Mile Creek between Pindera Downs Aboriginal Area and the Queensland Border. The Geography, of the parish is mostly the flat, arid landscape of the Channel Country. The parish has a Köppen climate classification of BWh (Hot desert). The County is barely inhabited with a population density of less than 1 person per 150 km² and the landscape is a flat arid scrubland.

The path of totality for the solar eclipse in November 2030 and October 2042 will pass over the parish.
