= Yantara County =

Yantara New South Wales
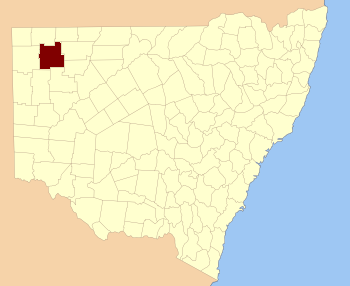
- Location in New South Wales
Lands administrative divisions around Yantara:
| Tongowoko | Tongowoko | Delalah |
| Evelyn | Yantara | Ularara |
| Mootwingee | Yungnulgra | Fitzgerald |

Yantara County is one of the 141 cadastral divisions of New South Wales.

The name Yantara is believed to be derived from a local Aboriginal word and is also the name of the local Yantara Station.

== Parishes within this county ==
A full list of parishes found within this county; their current LGA and mapping coordinates to the approximate centre of each location is as follows:

| Parish | LGA | Coordinates |
|---|---|---|
| Albert | Unincorporated | 30°06′33″S 142°21′33″E |
| Algie | Unincorporated | 29°51′27″S 142°56′13″E |
| Banjah | Unincorporated | 30°10′17″S 142°45′49″E |
| Booligurra | Unincorporated | 29°39′36″S 142°43′55″E |
| Buona | Unincorporated | 29°56′19″S 142°35′27″E |
| Butra | Unincorporated | 29°55′56″S 142°57′22″E |
| Clifton | Unincorporated | 29°45′11″S 142°36′09″E |
| Coallie | Unincorporated | 29°54′48″S 142°06′40″E |
| Cobham | Unincorporated | 30°20′36″S 142°11′53″E |
| Cockulby | Unincorporated | 30°02′05″S 142°18′36″E |
| Gilgwapla | Unincorporated | 29°57′17″S 142°18′36″E |
| Herbert | Unincorporated | 29°46′17″S 142°53′54″E |
| Kilpara | Unincorporated | 29°45′18″S 142°11′14″E |
| Kooltoo | Unincorporated | 30°03′11″S 142°29′38″E |
| Kootooloomondoo | Unincorporated | 30°04′43″S 142°57′22″E |
| Menderie | Unincorporated | 30°14′00″S 142°40′58″E |
| Narnumpy | Unincorporated | 30°05′25″S 142°35′08″E |
| Paldrumata | Unincorporated | 30°11′50″S 142°21′33″E |
| Pessima | Unincorporated | 29°53′55″S 142°45′44″E |
| Salt Lake | Unincorporated | 30°06′50″S 142°08′04″E |
| Takeiwa | Unincorporated | 29°51′55″S 142°44′04″E |
| Tarrawonda | Unincorporated | 29°35′46″S 142°11′25″E |
| Teperago | Unincorporated | 30°11′09″S 142°09′16″E |
| Terrawinda | Unincorporated | 29°40′48″S 142°19′11″E |
| Tiltabrinna | Unincorporated | 29°35′17″S 142°53′50″E |
| Torowoto | Unincorporated | 29°54′20″S 142°26′04″E |
| Uncana | Unincorporated | 30°20′06″S 142°48′36″E |
| Weimbutta | Unincorporated | 30°04′42″S 142°45′50″E |
| Whyjonta | Unincorporated | 29°45′11″S 142°29′48″E |
| Woombup | Unincorporated | 30°12′49″S 142°32′44″E |
| Wunawunty | Unincorporated | 29°59′37″S 142°06′40″E |
| Yandenberry | Unincorporated | 30°19′15″S 142°26′32″E |
| Yantara | Unincorporated | 29°49′31″S 142°16′40″E |
