= Tongowoko County =

Tongowoko New South Wales
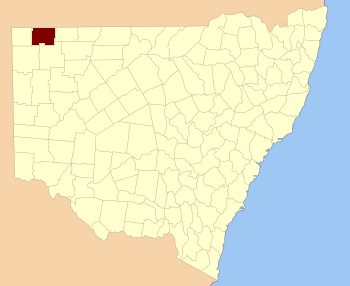
- Location in New South Wales
Lands administrative divisions around Tongowoko:
Queensland	Queensland	Queensland
Poole	Tongowoko	Delalah
Evelyn	Yantara	Yantara

Tongowoko County is one of the 141 cadastral divisions of New South Wales. It is located in the remote north-west of the state, south of the Queensland border.

The name Tongowoko is believed to be derived from a local Aboriginal word.

== Parishes within this county ==
A full list of parishes found within this county; their current LGA and mapping coordinates to the approximate centre of each location is as follows:

Parish	LGA	Coordinates
Binaroo	Unincorporated	29°23′50″S 142°20′04″E
Bolwarry	Unincorporated	29°26′39″S 142°30′25″E
Calathunda	Unincorporated	29°17′01″S 142°37′25″E
Caryapundy	Unincorporated	29°02′34″S 142°38′57″E
Churriga	Unincorporated	
Connulpie	Unincorporated	29°15′03″S 142°32′49″E
Hermitage	Unincorporated	29°22′57″S 142°01′09″E
Koonyaboothie	Unincorporated	29°36′59″S 142°23′17″E
Kurawillia	Unincorporated	29°36′59″S 142°34′32″E
Mokely	Unincorporated	
Mount Stuart	Unincorporated	29°30′32″S 142°01′08″E
Mount Wood	Unincorporated	29°16′58″S 142°17′37″E
Olive	Unincorporated	29°02′40″S 141°52′14″E
Silva	Unincorporated	29°07′49″S 142°21′47″E
Tooncurrie	Unincorporated	29°31′44″S 142°13′52″E
Tongowoko	Unincorporated	
Torrens	Unincorporated	29°14′00″S 142°09′27″E
Wanpah	Unincorporated	29°07′48″S 142°10′52″E
Warratta	Unincorporated	29°34′54″S 141°51′08″E
Warri	Unincorporated	29°02′09″S 141°57′55″E
Whittabranah	Unincorporated	29°12′31″S 142°01′10″E
Yalpunga	Unincorporated	29°02′40″S 142°03′13″E
Yanderra	Unincorporated	29°20′36″S 142°34′55″E

From 2009, the parishes of Tongowoko lie within Division A of the Western Livestock Health and Pest District, along with Evelyn, Farnell, Fitzgerald, Mootwingee, Poole, Tandora, Yantara, and Yungnulgra Counties; some parishes of Killara, Yancowinna, and Young; and with Connulpie and Omura Parishes of Delalah County.
