= Mount Wood Station =

Defunct pastoral lease in New South Wales

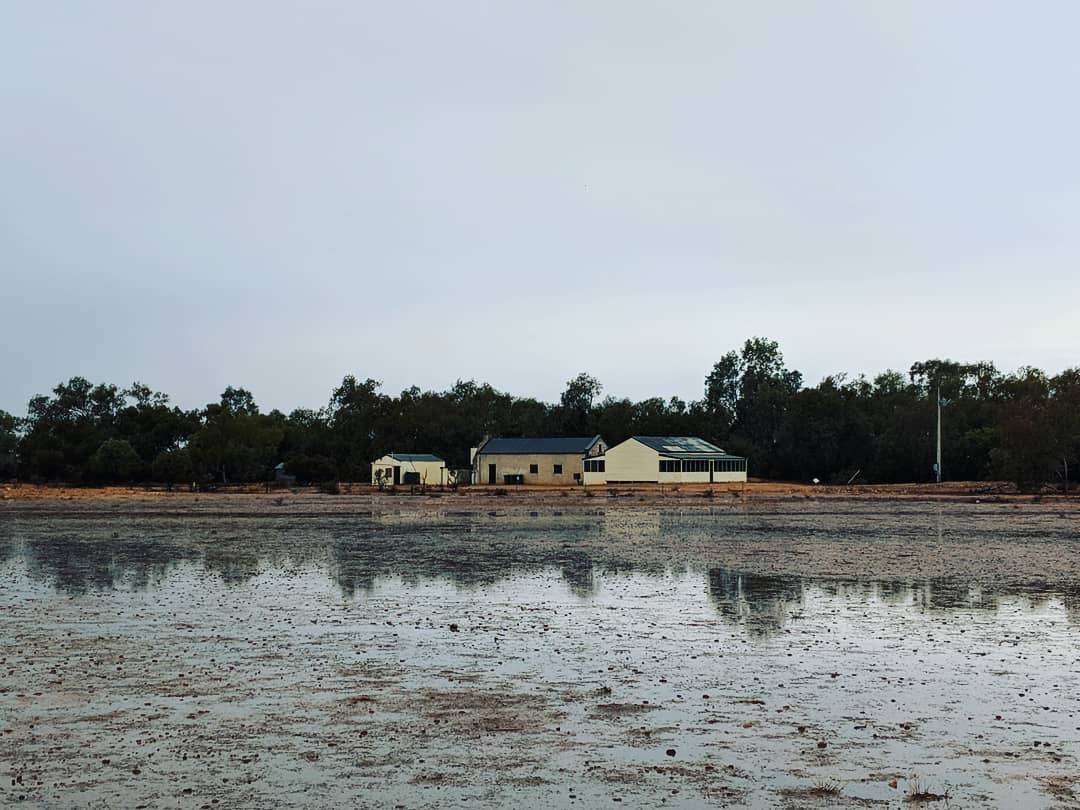
- Mount Wood shearers' quarters after 10mm of rain, 2018

- Location within New South Wales Location within Australia
- 29.4732°S 142.2257°E
- Location: Sturt National Park, Tibooburra, Unincorporated Far West region of New South Wales, Australia

History
- Built: 1890–1969

Site notes
- Owner: Office of Environment and Heritage

New South Wales Heritage Register
- Official name: Mount Wood Station; Mt Wood; Whittabrinnah and Mount Wood Pastoral Company
- Type: State heritage (complex / group)
- Designated: 2 April 1999
- Reference no.: 1001
- Type: Homestead Complex
- Category: Farming and Grazing

The Mount Wood Station, also known as simply Mt Wood, is a heritage-listed former cattle station that now forms part of the Sturt National Park in Tibooburra in the Unincorporated Far West region of New South Wales, Australia. The cattle station was built between 1890 and 1969. As a national park, the property is owned by the NSW Officer of Environment and Heritage, an agency of the Government of New South Wales. It was added to the New South Wales State Heritage Register on 2 April 1999.

Mount Wood Station is east of Tibooburra, New South Wales, and gives its name to the Parish of Mount Wood.

== History ==
Expeditions were made through the area in Australia's early history. These included Charles Sturt (1847–48), who undertook an expedition into central Australia during which the party was stranded for several months at both Fort Grey and Depot Glenn (near Milparinka); and Burke and Wills (1860–61), in which this expedition passed northwards through the eastern section of the national park (probably Mount Wood.

== Description ==
Mount Wood Homestead complex is today within Sturt National Park. The national park is representative of the shrub rangeland in western New South Wales, it provides one of the best examples of this land type in conjunction with wattle (Acacia spp.) dominated fluviatile and aeolian land types. The area, due to its size, is an important wildlife refuge, and has a significant species diversity including 246 native species, as well as a high diversity of landforms including Aeolian dune systems, Mitchell Grass Plains, the Jump Ups and Gibber Desert.

The national park lies in the south-west of a vast bowl shaped depression which covers eastern central Australia, and is mainly covered by low undulating plains of Gibber Desert in the east or sand dunes in the west except for where it contains the south-western end of the Grey Range. Here the Jump Ups, a range of low flat topped hills (mesa) run through the centre of the park and along its eastern boundary. Just inside the park boundary at Tibooburra is a granite outcrop which has formations of hilltop tors. The southern extremity of the Grey Range in the north of the park has associated mesa formations and eroded gullies, the remainder of the park has the occasional stony hill and many drainage basins.

The park has three major vegetation associations, these include a mulga association; saltbush association; and bluebush association.

=== Complex features ===
The Mount Wood Homestead complex comprises:

Landscape features, including fields;

- Mt. Wood camping ground, north-east of homestead complex;
- Visitor car park, north of homestead complex and east of vehicle shed;
- Self-guided walk, runs in a ring around homestead and stables complexes.
- Thomson's Creek runs (when it is running) south of the homestead complex. There is a suspension bridge over the creek east of the complex and east of the woolshed.

The garden comprises a line of eucalypts c. 1960 behind the kitchen and laundry/store; two trees to the right hand side (in plan) of the 1897 homestead; two paths linking the two homesteads (1897, 1935); a drift of three eucalypts in front of the 1935 homestead; a pepper tree (Schinus molle) near the stone hut (c. 1890) and poultry runs; regrowth vegetation to the left (in plan) of the radio aerial and poultry runs; and horse yards, from the 1960s.

Homestead

The homestead is in fact two homesteads connected via a covered link between the 1897 homestead that is stone, square, with a verandah all around, and the second homestead. The homestead retains elements from each stage of its history in archaeological or standing form. Its important documents of the long history of station operations, and a potential research resource in terms of its archaeological values.

Shearers quarters (1955)

Located south-east of the homestead complex and north of Thomson's Creek, this is a complex of three structures that includes the shearer's quarters (1955); a kitchen; and other unidentified structure. The shearers quarters retains elements from each stage of its history in archaeological or standing form. Its important documents of the long history of station operations, and a potential research resource in terms of its archaeological values.

Woolshed

Located south-east of the homestead complex across (south of) Thomson's Creek near the suspension bridge.

Woolscours

The woolscour has been well researched, and is still the only 19th century station-based scour demonstrated to have survived largely intact. While comparative research is still patchy, the Mount Wood woolscour appears to be a rare survival of a once common pastoral technology, critical to the settlement of the pastoral frontier.

Vehicle shed

c. 1960s shed on a concrete slab and pier foundation, supported by 100-millimetre (3.9 in) round painted steel pipe posts with dooden rafters and battens, clad in painted corrugated iron. The shed is roughly 20.7 metres (68 ft) long, 9.7 metres (32 ft) deep and 2.5 metres (8 ft 2 in) high. Wooden roof support structure (battens and beams).

Other structures include outstations, archaeological sites, ruins that include shed base (beside the vehicle shed); former approach track (towards garden and homestead); tank base (near generator shed); standing structures include, in a cluster around the stables, gallows (1960s); dog kennels (c. 1960); horse yards (1960s); cow bail; stables (1960s); generator shed (1955); fuel shed (1955); metal racks; g.i.tank; blacksmith's shop and workshop (c. 1920); pump (1930s); and vehicle shed. In a cluster around the homestead there is a laundry and store (1958); kitchen (1939); meat house; saddle room; stone cistern (1897); station tanks (4); galvanised iron fence; stone hut (c. 1890); poultry runs; radio aerial. To the left of the homestead and stables complex (in plan), site of radio aerial arrays.

The individual elements vary in age, but even the most recent are located upon traditional sites of pastoral operations, and an unusually complete representative sample of the elements typical of pastoral stations survives, as archaeological sites, ruins, standing structures or landscape features.

== Heritage listing ==
As at 11 January 2002, Mount Wood Homestead complex, shearers quarters, woolshed, woolscours and outstations are significant in that they demonstrate a continuity of pastoral activity in the arid north-west of NSW over a one hundred-year period. The individual elements vary in age, but even the most recent are located upon traditional sites of pastoral operations, and an unusually complete representative sample of the elements typical of pastoral stations survives, as archaeological sites, ruins, standing structures or landscape features. The extant evidence clearly illustrates the themes of housing, isolation, land tenure/settlement, pastoralism and technology. Some elements of the place are significant in their own right.

The woolscour has been well researched, and is still the only 19th century station-based scour demonstrated to have survived largely intact. While comparative research is still patchy, the Mount Wood woolscour appears to be a rare survival of a once common pastoral technology, critical to the settlement of the pastoral frontier.

The shearers quarters and homestead retain elements from each stage of their history in archaeological or standing form. They are both important documents of the long history of station operations, and a potential research resource in terms of their archaeological values. Individual elements have aesthetic (architectural) and scientific (archaeological and technological) values.

The survival of the range of elements present at Mount Wood is believed to be already uncommon in western NSW, and may become increasingly rare as time passes.

Mount Wood Station was listed on the New South Wales State Heritage Register on 2 April 1999.
