= Caryapundy Station =

Pastoral lease and former cattle station in New South Wales

Coordinates: 29.09°S 142.43°E

Location in New South Wales

Caryapundy Station, most commonly known as Caryapundy or Caryapundy Swamp, is a pastoral lease that once operated as a cattle station in the channel country of outback New South Wales.

== Geography ==
It is situated about 56 kilometres (35 mi) north east of Tibooburra and 192 kilometres (119 mi) west of Hungerford.

The tender was accepted for the run named Caryapundy by J. C. Myers in 1872. Myers was also had his tenders accepted for other runs such as Bollwarry, Mount Wood, Teriwinda and Torrens Creek.

In 1873 the 64,000 acres (25,900 ha) unstocked property was put up for auction by the Minister of Lands.

The property was put up for sale as part of five blocks owned by Mr. O'Connor. Caryapundy, Conulpie, Bolwarry, Omura No. 5 and Omura No. 6 were all for sale and advertised as being of Burke and Wills track and well watered by the Bulloo River, Tongowoko, Torrens and other creeks. At the time the area was made up of grassed downs and saltbush country.

By 1892 the property was in the hands of Sidney Kidman, who moved 10,000 sheep and 1,000 head of cattle from the station. It was still owned by the Kidman brothers in 1899; Sidney Kidman described it as "one of the worst in New South Wales, the 54,200 acres (21,934 ha) might carry 230 cattle but no more, much of it is a claypan that will never carry feed".

== Caryapundy Swamp ==
The swamp is a wetland that partly lies within the station boundaries. The wetland straddles Queensland and New South Wales, and is about 100 kilometres (62 mi) in length and 35 kilometres (22 mi) wide. During flooding the wetland is often over 1.8 metres (6 ft) deep and can cover the dog-proof fence between the states. The area is flooded about once every ten years but is also prone to drought. The area flooded in 2010 after a long drought and an estimated 35,000 pelican nests were found within the swamp area.

The Narriearra Caryapundy Swamp National Park was established in 2021.

== See also ==
- List of ranches and stations
