= Parish of Silva (Tongowoko County) =

Silva located 29°07′49″S 142°21′47″ halfway between Bulloo Downs, Queensland, and Tibooburra, New South Wales, is a cadastral parish of Tongowoko County New South Wales.

The parish is on Twelve Mile Creek just south of the Queensland border. The parish landscape is flat and arid scrubland of the Channel Country. The parish has a Köppen climate classification of BWh (Hot desert).
