= Olive Downs Station =

Defunct pastoral lease in New South Wales

Olive Downs Station is one of 7 former cattle stations in Sturt National Park in the north western Corner of New South Wales.

== History ==
The station is on the traditional lands of the Yarli people.

The first Europeans to the area were Charles Sturt and then Burke & Wills.

The push for sheep pasture had reached the Darling River in the late 1840s and early 1850s, and by the early to mid-1860s pastoralists were moving up the Warrego and Paroo Rivers. By the late 1870s most of north-west New South Wales had been ‘claimed’ as pastoral properties though access to permanent water in the more arid country continued to be the key factor for establishing sheep stations.... The discovery of the Great Artesian Basin led to sinking of artesian bores and the beginnings of a major travelling stock route in 1884.

Olive Downs Station was established between 1884 and 1886 but the actual date is uncertain.

It was 92,000 acres and the first recorded owners were Charles Murray and William Sanderson in 1889. The property changed hands a number of times and grew in area to become 512,000 acres in 1912 and even larger with the addition of an adjoining property in Queensland sometime before 1924. In 1924 or 1927 it became part of Sidney Kidman’s pastoral empire. It has been said that Kidman controlled a third of the West Darling region by 1920 (Stanley 1991 cited in Peter Freeman Pty Ltd 2004). Olive Downs Station ran huge flocks of sheep in its early days but by 1927–1932 these were dramatically reduced to an average of 12,172 head of sheep.
