= Parish of Mount Wood =

Mount Wood, New South Wales
- Coordinates: 29°16′58″S 142°17′37″E
- Country: Australia
- State: New South Wales
- Region: Channel Country
- LGA: Unincorporated Far West Region
- Location: 1,187 km (738 mi) NW of Sydney; 843 km (524 mi) N of Adelaide, South Australia; 335 km (208 mi) N of Broken Hill

Government
  - State electorate: Barwon
  - Federal division: Parkes
- Elevation: 183 m (600 ft)
- Postcode: 2880
- County: Tongowoko
- Mean max temp: 27.4 °C (81.3 °F)
- Mean min temp: 13.9 °C (57.0 °F)
- Annual rainfall: 230.5 mm (9.07 in)

Mount Wood, New South Wales is a remote civil parish of Tongowoko County, New South Wales near Milparinka, New South Wales.

== Geography ==
Mount wood is located at 29°16′58″S 142°17′37″E, between Tibooburra, New South Wales and Pindera Downs Aboriginal Area. The Parish now lies within the Sturt National Park, and ruins of the Mount Wood Station on the Thompson Creek are preserved there. The Geography, of the parish is mostly the flat, arid landscape of the Channel Country. The parish has a Köppen climate classification of BWh (Hot desert).

== History ==
The parish is the traditional lands of the Wangkumara People.

The first European was Charles Sturt who camped at nearby Preservation Creek (Mount Poole) for six months during 1845, and in 1861 the Burke and Wills expedition passed to the east, through what is now the Pindera Downs Aboriginal Area.

The push for sheep pasture had reached the Darling River in the late 1840s and 1850s, and by the early to mid-1860s pastoralists were moving up the Warrego and Paroo rivers. By the late 1870s most of north-west New South Wales had been ‘claimed’ as pastoral properties though access to permanent water in the more arid country continued to be the key factor for establishing sheep stations. The discovery of gold in the Grey Range near Mount Poole about 30 kilometres south-west of present day Tibooburra, provided the impetus for an improvement in water supplies. The gold rush that ensued led to a rapid increase in the region’s population to about 3000 people and to towns like Tibooburra and Milparinka springing up. The gold finds also triggered a rapid taking up of pastoral runs in the district. The coincidental discovery of the Great Artesian Basin led to sinking of artesian bores and the beginnings of a major travelling stock route in 1884.

Mount Wood Station was taken up in late 1881 or early 1882 over an area of 368,385 acres (149,080 hectares). The number of stock peaked in 1890 when 64,000 sheep were listed for the property, equating to a stocking rate of 1 sheep per 6.25 acres. By 1900 this figure had fallen dramatically to 37,316 (1 sheep per 10.72 acres) and at the time of the last shearing in 1972, to 16,000 (1 sheep per 25 acres). Drought, invasion by rabbits and depletion of native vegetation led to this rapid decline in carrying capacity for sheep and the belated realisation that the ancient, nutrient poor ecosystem was unsuited for this type of activity.

Sturt National Park was established in 1972. Today the entire parish is within Sturt National Park, and is also within a smaller Conservation area listed by the NSW Heritage office.
