= Narriearra Caryapundy Swamp National Park =

National park in New South Wales, Australia

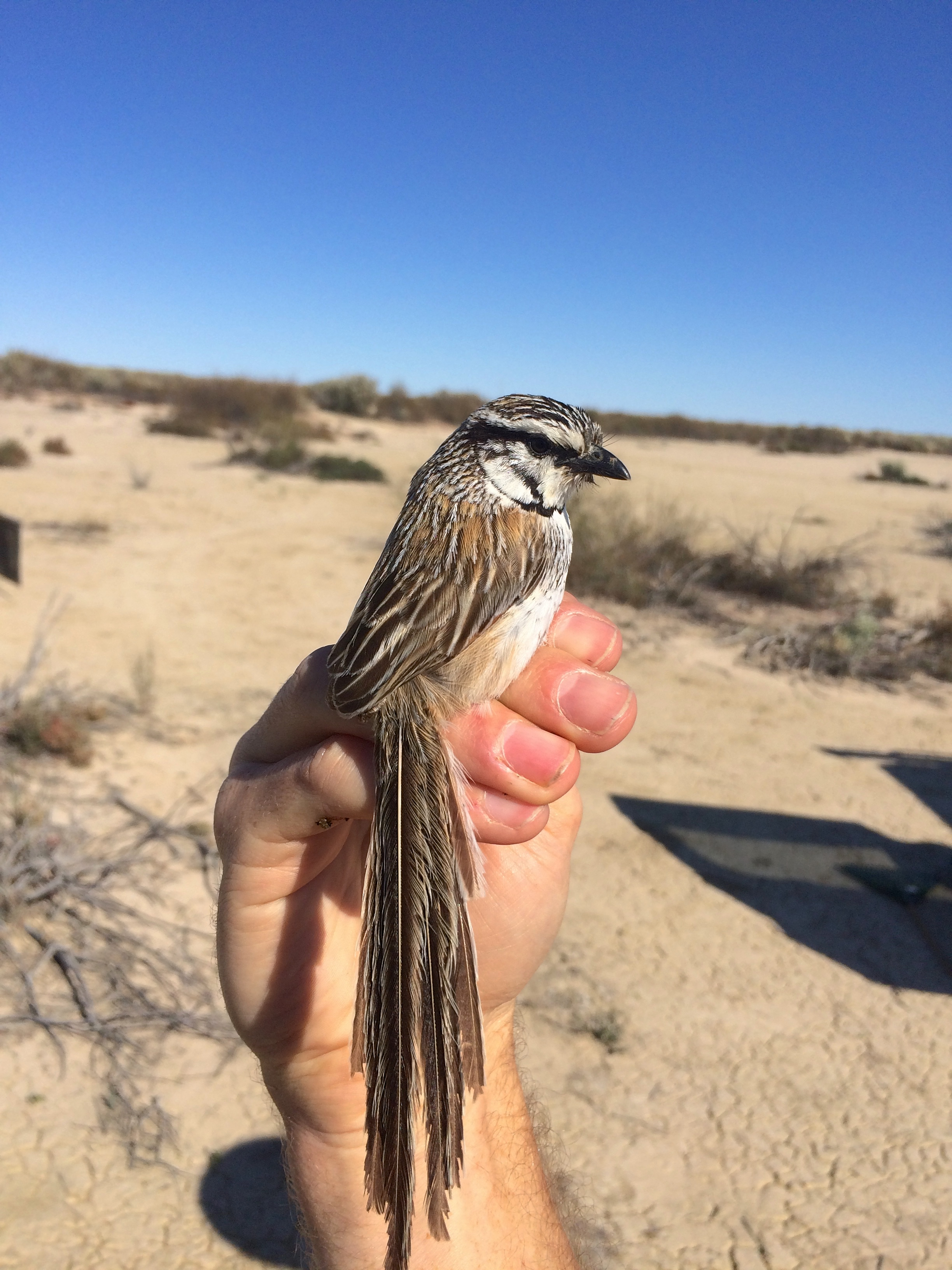
- A Grey grasswren in Narriearra Caryapundy Swamp National Park (north-western New South Wales)

- Location within New South Wales Location within Australia
- Location: New South Wales, Australia
- Coordinates: 29°12′54″S 142°31′48″E
- Area: 153,415 ha (592.34 sq mi)

Ramsar Wetland
- Official name: Caryapundy Swamp
- Designated: 17 December 2021
- Reference no.: 2520

Narriearra Caryapundy Swamp National Park is a national park in northwest New South Wales. In June 2020 the Government of New South Wales acquired 153,415 ha (379,100 acres), or 1,534 km^{2} (592 sq mi) of private land for a new national park, when it purchased Narriearra station in the state’s far north-west. The area includes “ephemeral wetlands and landscapes” that had not previously been included in the state’s conservation areas. Together with the nearby Sturt National Park, there would be a nearly contiguous conservation area of about 500,000 ha (1,200,000 acres), which is twice the size of the Australian Capital Territory. The new property lies next to the Pindera Downs Aboriginal area, which is rich in cultural artefacts of Aboriginal Australians. It is the largest ever purchase of private land for conservation in the state. The Dingo Fence on the border with Queensland forms the northern boundary of the property.

The Tibooburra Local Aboriginal Land Council has been invited to suggest a name for the new park.

Various ecosystems are supported in the park, the white tree stands out from the plants, then the open salty low shrub that grows over the lush grass vegetation. The park houses red kangaroos, wedge-tailed eagles and brolgas. Since 2021 a portion of the park has been designated as a protected Ramsar site.
