= Tibooburra =

- Town
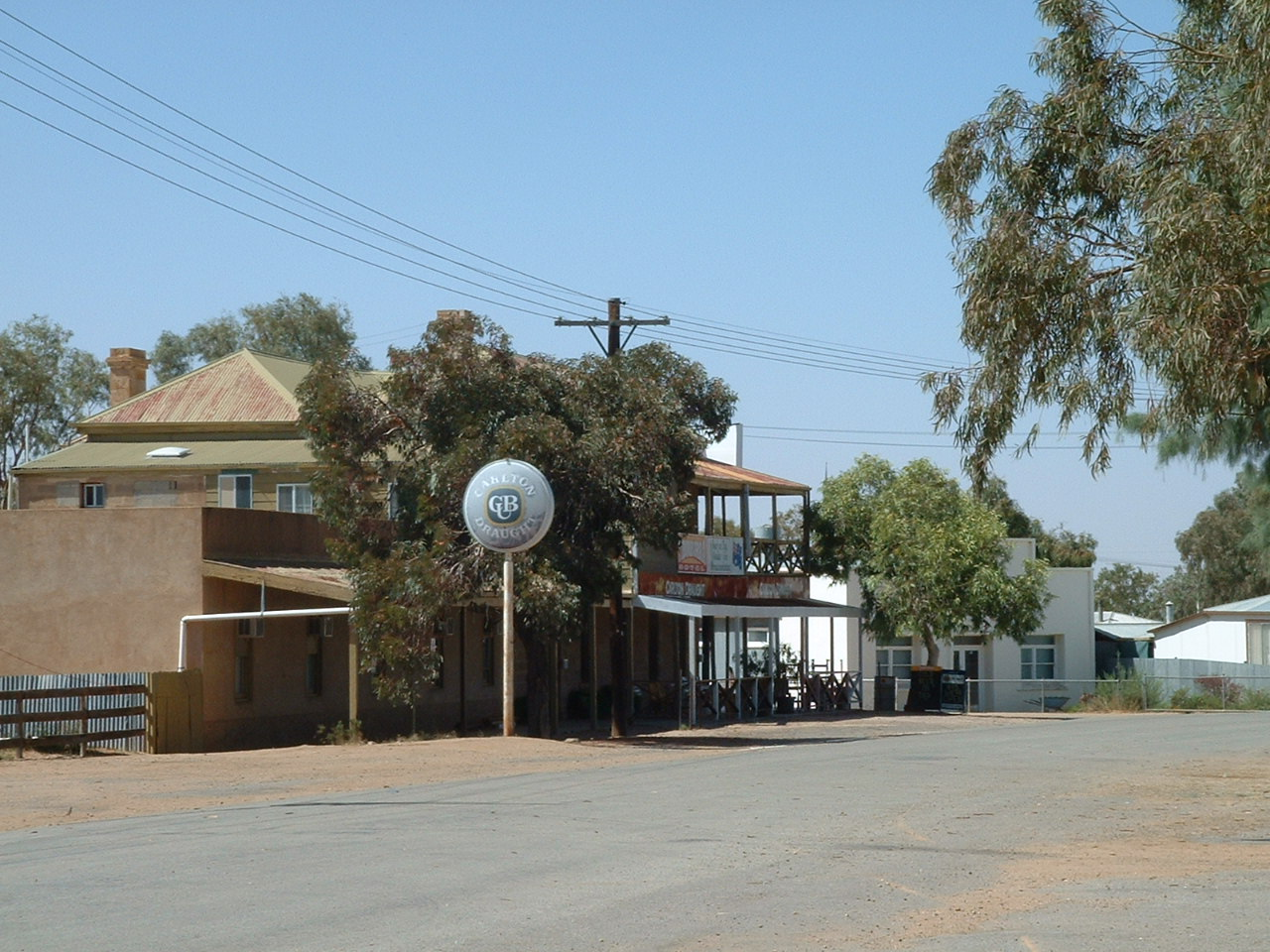
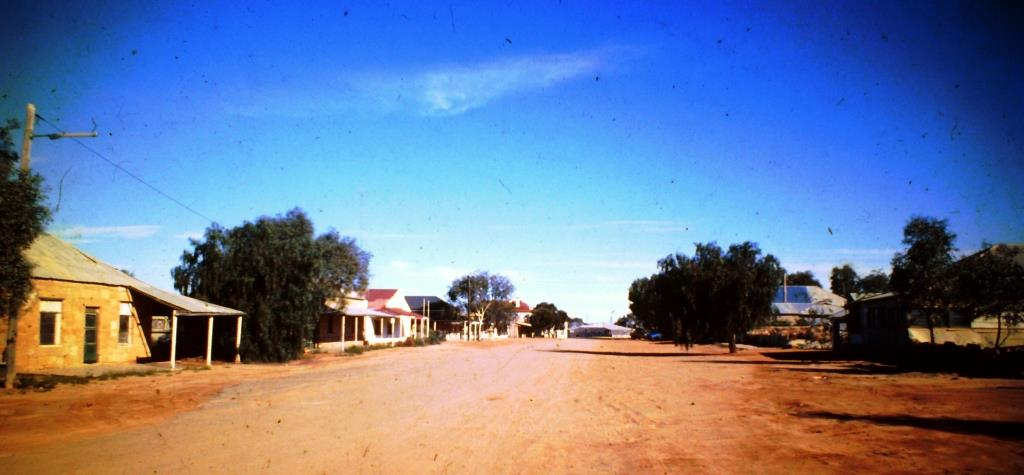
- Main street of Tibooburra looking towards the two storey hotel Tibooburra main street in 1976

- Coordinates: 29°25′59″S 142°00′29″E
- Country: Australia
- State: New South Wales
- LGA: Unincorporated Far West Region
- Location: 1,187 km (738 mi) NW of Sydney; 843 km (524 mi) N of Adelaide; 335 km (208 mi) N of Broken Hill

Government
  - State electorate: Barwon
  - Federal division: Parkes
- Elevation: 183 m (600 ft)

Population
  - Total: 95 (2021 census)
- Postcode: 2880
- County: Poole
- Mean max temp: 27.4 °C (81.3 °F)
- Mean min temp: 13.9 °C (57.0 °F)
- Annual rainfall: 230.5 mm (9.07 in)
Localities around Tibooburra
South Australia	Cameron Corner (QLD)	Bulloo Downs (QLD)
South Australia	Tibooburra	Wanaaring
South Australia	Milparinka; Packsaddle	White Cliffs

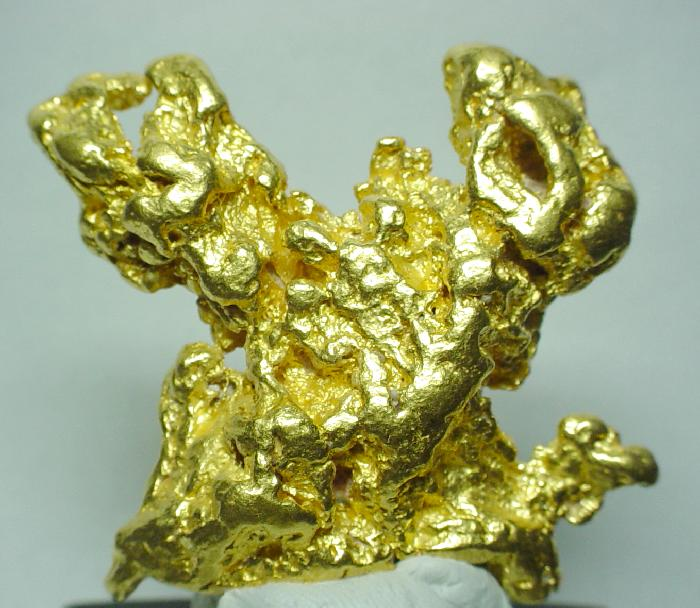
Gold specimen from Tibooburra, size 5 x 4.5 x 1.1 cm.

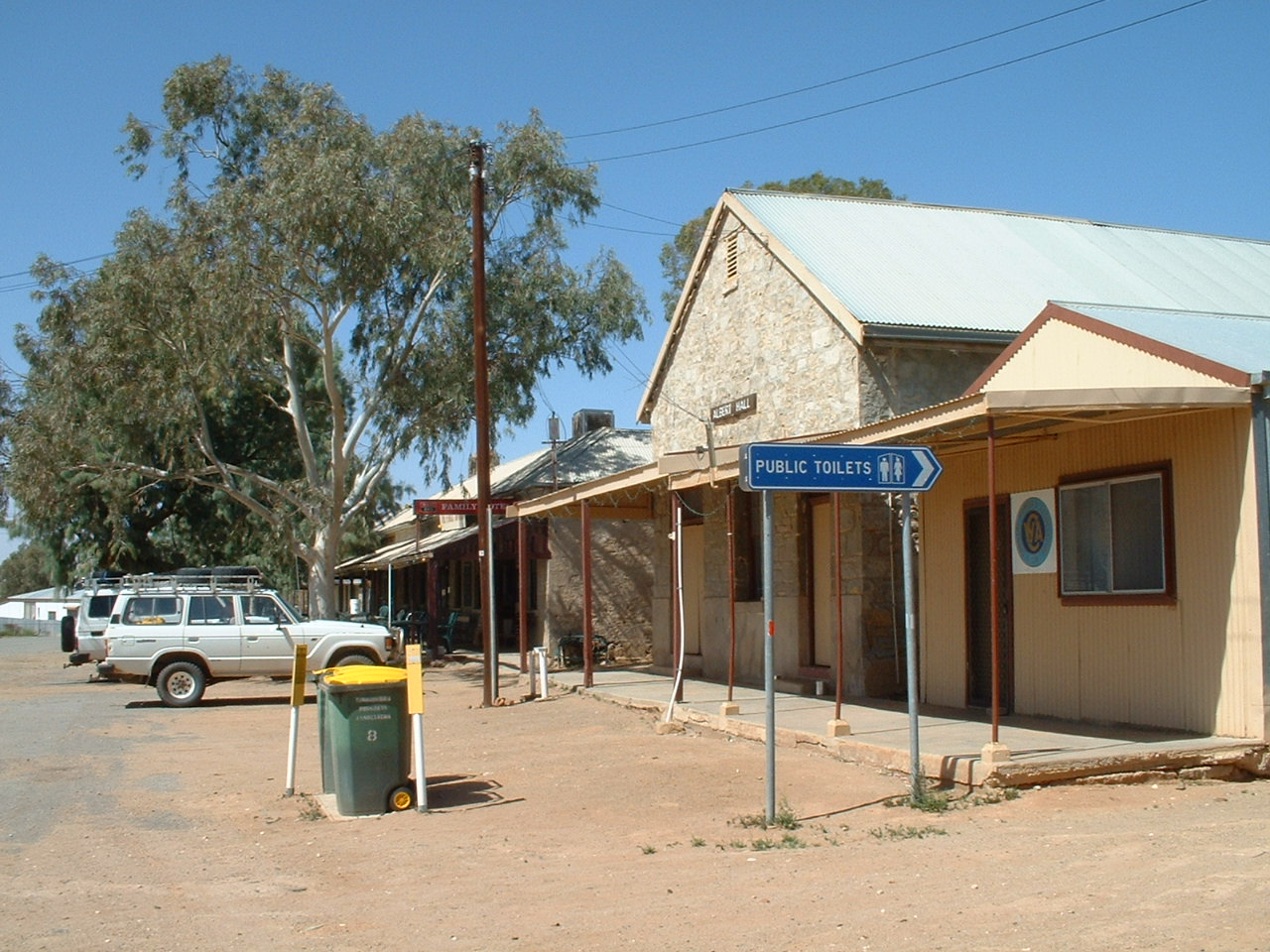
The Albert Hall in Tibooburra, NSW

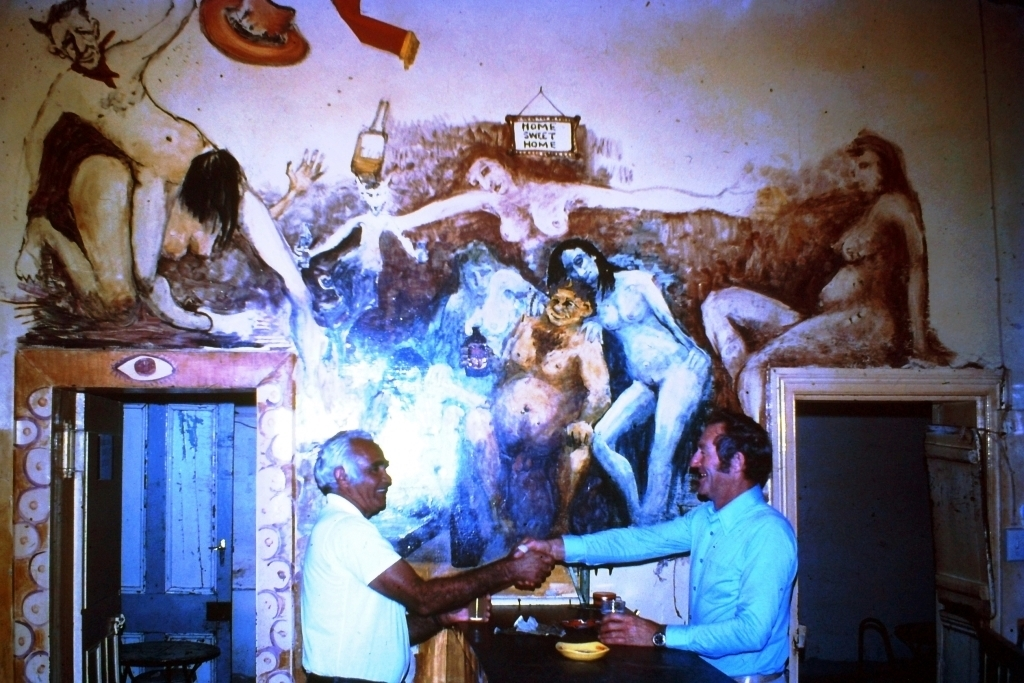
Clifton Pugh mural in the bar of the Family Hotel, Tibooburra. The borrowed effects are found in the works of Norman Lindsay and the outstretched arms of the central figure is a recurring motif in Arthur Boyd's paintings. 1976

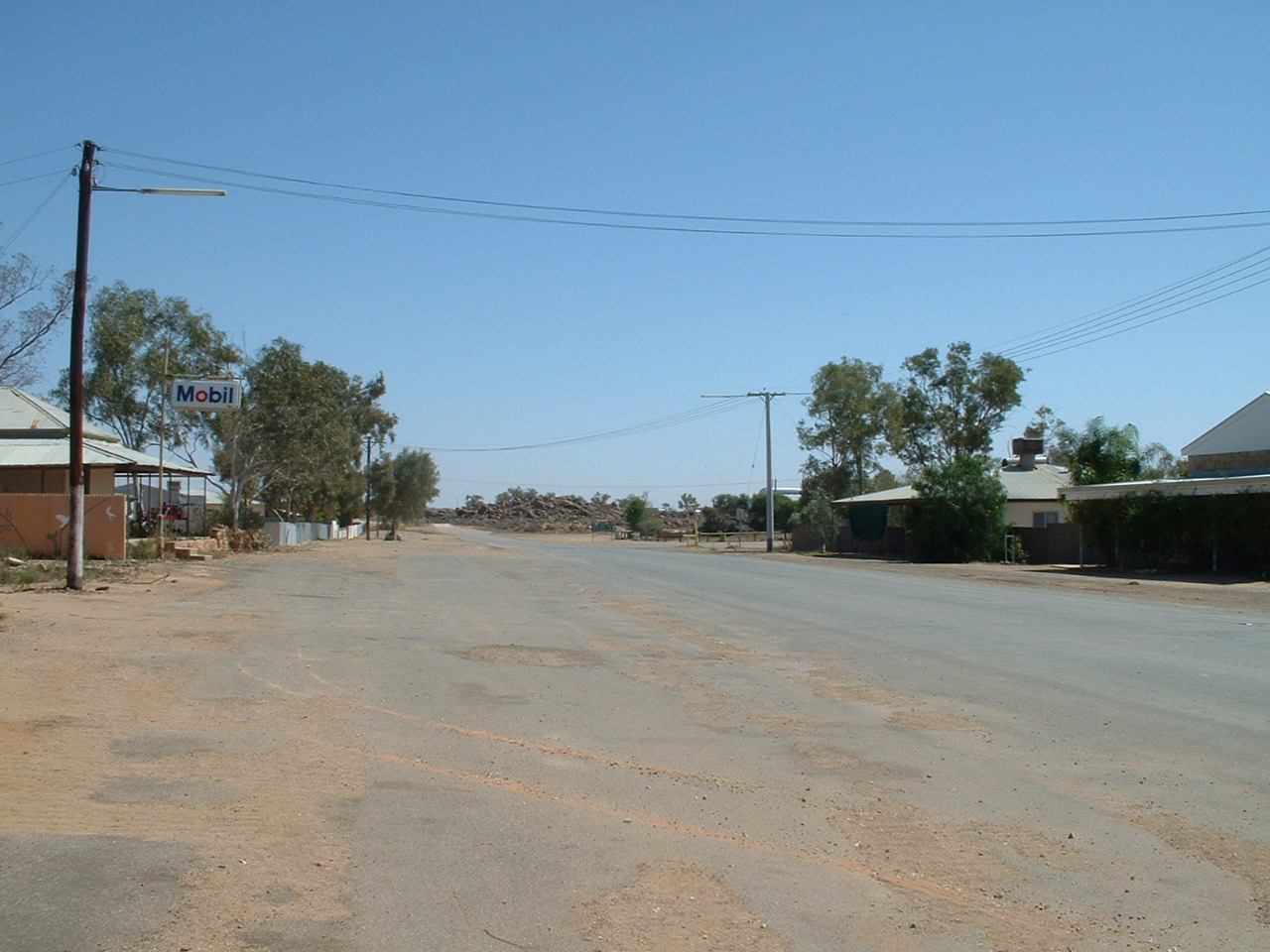
Main street of Tibooburra looking towards the Charles Sturt memorial

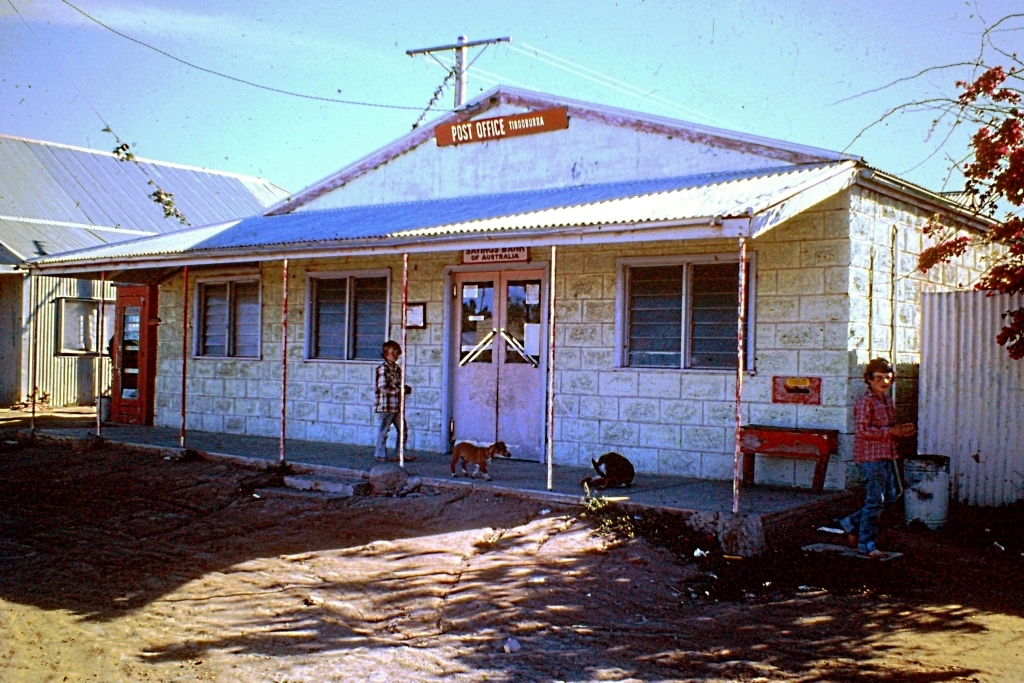
Post Office, Tibooburra, NSW. 1976

Tibooburra (pronounced /ˈtɪbəbʌrə/ or /ˈtɪpəbʌrə/) is a town in the far northwest of New South Wales, Australia, in the Sturt Stony Desert. It is approximately located 1,187 kilometres (738 mi) from the state capital, Sydney. It is most frequently visited by tourists on their way to Sturt National Park or on the way to or from Innamincka in South Australia and Birdsville in Queensland. At the 2016 census, Tibooburra had a population of 134. Although facilities in Tibooburra are quite limited, fuel, meals, and a range of accommodation options are available. All significant support services (medical, dental, hospital, retail, mechanical, commercial) are based in Broken Hill.

The New South Wales National Parks and Wildlife Service has a tourist information centre in the township. There is also a police station. There is an airstrip about 6 km east of the village. The road from Broken Hill was finally completely sealed in 2020 and officially opened in July 2020.

== History ==
=== Indigenous history ===
Tibooburra is in the traditional lands of the Wangkumarra Aboriginal peoples. In 1938, almost all of the remaining Aboriginal population of Tibooburra and the surrounding region were forcibly relocated by the Aborigines Protection Board to places such as Brewarrina, Menindee and Kempsey.

=== British exploration ===
The first European expedition to enter the area was that led by Charles Sturt in 1844. He spent six months trapped by drought at Depot Glen, south of Tibooburra. He then tried to travel north west and was defeated by the desert. Burke and Wills also went through the area in 1861 on the journey north towards the Gulf of Carpentaria. It was the search for Burke and Wills that led to the opening up of the country for the pastoral industry.

=== Gold rush of the 1880s ===
Following a gold rush to the Albert Goldfields (centred at nearby Milparinka), gold was found around Tibooburra in 1880. At first the area was called The Granites. When in 1881 the goldfields warden W.H.J. Slee (resident at Milparinka) had a town laid out he named it Tibooburra. Although he named the streets after European explorers, he preferred the Aboriginal name for the locality for the town. Slee had his observations on Aboriginal customs in the Tibooburra region published by the Linnean Society of NSW. The town's name seems to be derived from an Aboriginal word for heap of boulders (Gibberburra). There was drought in 1884. In 1887 Slee reported that there were 19 gold puddling machines at work, with a population at and about Tibooburra of 250. It was said that gold was found exposed in the streets after heavy rain.

=== 20th-century history ===
By 1900, the gold mining activity had waned, to be replaced by the pastoral industry. Sheep stations, necessarily large in area due to the aridity, were the mainstay of Tibooburra until the 1980s, providing most of the social and commercial activity. For over a century the township had remained remote because of rough unsealed roads, but with the popularity of 4WD driving, and bitumen roads, it became within comfortable reach of the tourism industry.

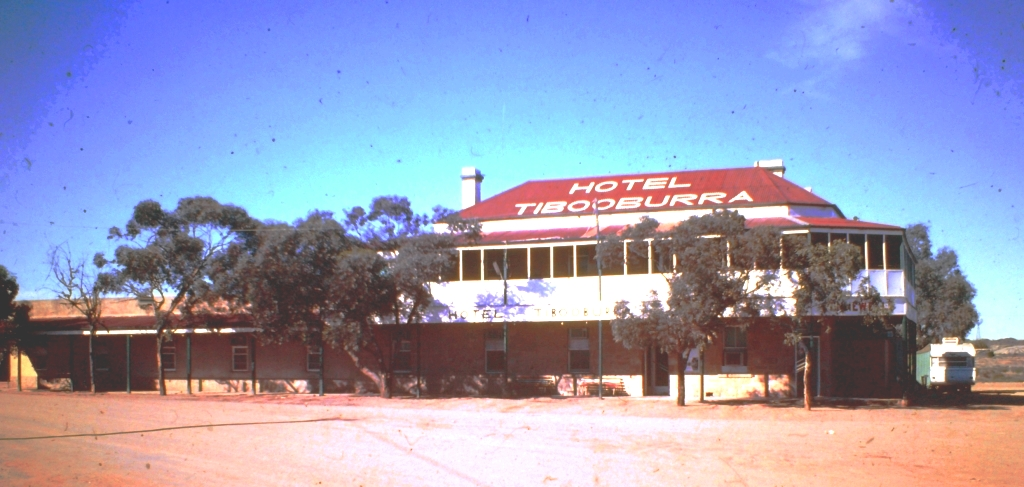
Hotel Tibooburra. 1976

In more recent times musicians and artists, in particular Clifton Pugh, became fascinated with this remote outback region. Pugh often stayed at the Family Hotel (opened 1882) where he painted a number of murals, drawings, and sketches on an inside wall of the hotel.

== Tourist attractions ==
Apart from the arid landscape, the main natural tourist attraction is the remarkable granite rock outcrops which erupt immediately beside (and even among) the town streets. Historic buildings, harking back to the pioneering era, are found about the town. Nearby is Sturt National Park, which incorporates Cameron Corner, where the borders of three States meet; Queensland, South Australia and New South Wales. The dog fence along the borders is also an important tourist attraction. Although there is a "settlement" at Cameron Corner, services there are even more limited.

The Family Hotel (as mentioned above) and the more substantial Tibooburra Hotel (the Two Storey Hotel) both attract tourists for a drink or two. There is also a drive-in theatre in the main street.

== Heritage listings ==
The Mount Wood Station is a heritage-listed former cattle station in the Sturt National Park.

== Tibooburra Outback School of the Air ==
Tibooburra Outback School of the Air is the town's education provider, servicing both the local residents and the children of property owners in the area. It was established as a Distance Education Centre in 1991 by Tony Bush after being approved for the project in 1990. Prior to that students attended in town, and students on properties were educated through central schools further afield in towns such as Broken Hill. The school itself was established in 1886. No high school facilities exist in the town, children travel 365 km to the nearest high school, do home schooling, or attend boarding schools.

Once a term students from the external properties attend a 'mini-school' at the school. Mini-schools typically have themes (such as pirates or the circus) and consist of a range of fun and educational activities. Out of town families also receive two home visits a year, in which a teacher (or teachers) and students visit and spend the day on the property.

In 2004 the school switched from radio based education to the Satellite Education Program.

== Climate ==
Tibooburra has a hot desert climate (BWh) with temperatures regularly reaching above 40 °C (104 °F) in summer. Temperatures are milder in winter, averaging around 19 °C (66 °F) in the daytime but frosts are common during night-time. Rainfall is scant throughout the year, apart from the occasional thunderstorm, though in March 1949 and January 1974 the town received around 390 millimetres (15 in) or nearly twice its average annual rainfall. In its driest year of 1919, only 47.9 millimetres (1.89 in) fell.

Climate data for Tibooburra
Month	Jan	Feb	Mar	Apr	May	Jun	Jul	Aug	Sep	Oct	Nov	Dec	Year
Record high °C (°F)	47.9 (118.2)	46.5 (115.7)	45.0 (113.0)	38.3 (100.9)	34.4 (93.9)	28.9 (84.0)	31.7 (89.1)	34.1 (93.4)	39.3 (102.7)	42.4 (108.3)	46.4 (115.5)	46.7 (116.1)	47.9 (118.2)
Mean daily maximum °C (°F)	36.2 (97.2)	35.2 (95.4)	32.1 (89.8)	27.0 (80.6)	21.9 (71.4)	18.4 (65.1)	17.8 (64.0)	20.4 (68.7)	24.6 (76.3)	28.5 (83.3)	32.1 (89.8)	34.9 (94.8)	27.4 (81.3)
Mean daily minimum °C (°F)	22.1 (71.8)	21.7 (71.1)	18.6 (65.5)	13.9 (57.0)	9.4 (48.9)	6.4 (43.5)	5.4 (41.7)	6.9 (44.4)	10.3 (50.5)	14.1 (57.4)	17.6 (63.7)	20.4 (68.7)	13.9 (57.0)
Record low °C (°F)	5.6 (42.1)	8.9 (48.0)	5.6 (42.1)	1.7 (35.1)	−1.1 (30.0)	−2.5 (27.5)	−2.3 (27.9)	−0.6 (30.9)	0.0 (32.0)	−1.0 (30.2)	3.9 (39.0)	5.6 (42.1)	−2.5 (27.5)
Average precipitation mm (inches)	28.0 (1.10)	29.8 (1.17)	24.8 (0.98)	14.5 (0.57)	18.0 (0.71)	16.5 (0.65)	16.6 (0.65)	11.6 (0.46)	12.4 (0.49)	18.4 (0.72)	18.0 (0.71)	22.1 (0.87)	230.5 (9.07)

== See also ==
- Tibooburra Airport
