= Pantyikali dialect =

Paakantyi dialect of Australia

Pantyikali
- Baarundji
- Native to: Australia
- Native speakers: 4 (2005)
- Language family: Pama–Nyungan: Darling; Pantyikali

Language codes
- ISO 639-3: drl Paakantyi
- Glottolog: None band1337 retired, but retains references
- AIATSIS: D17

The Pantyikali (Bandjigali) dialect, also called Baarundji (meaning the people of the Paroo River) or Weyneubulcoo (Wanyuparlku, Wanyiwalku), is a dialect of the Paakantyi language. Pantyikali is spoken in New South Wales, Australia, northwest, north, and west of White Cliffs. In 2005, it was not extinct, with four speakers reported.

The Pantyikali people of the Paakantyi were extensively studied and photographed in the 19th century by Frederic Bonney, the owner of Momba Station.

The major work on the Paakantyi language and its dialects has been that of linguist Luise Hercus.

== Name ==
The name derives from "pantyi" ("creek") and the suffix "-kali" ("people"), meaning "creek people".
