= Dick Barkinji =

Australian explorer

Dick of the Barkinji people, also known as Mountain, was an Indigenous Australian explorer who was on the Burke and Wills support expedition.

Dick was a member of the Barkinji people from the Darling River, who were on good terms with the Europeans. Dick probably came into contact with British settlers who were establishing farms along the Darling River during his youth.

He was on the Burke and Wills expedition support expedition from the Murray River to Coopers Creek, in September 1860, when Trooper Lyons and Alexander MacPherson became lost in the Gibber desert, south of Coopers Creek.

Dick accompanied Trooper Lyons and Alexander MacPherson when they set out from Menindie to convey despatches to Burke. When they became lost and desperately short of provisions and water, Dick conveyed them to the care of local Aborigines. He then returned to camp, walking for eight days after having run his horse into the ground.

A brass plate and 5 sovereigns (£5 = $10) were presented to Dick in September 1861 by Governor of Victoria Henry Barkly.

== See also ==
- List of Indigenous Australian historical figures
