= Morden (surname) =

Morden is an English surname. Notable people with the surname include:

- Clem Morden, Australian rules footballer
- Daniel Morden, Welsh writer
- Jennifer Morden, Canadian film and television production designer
- Jessica Morden, British politician
- Jim Morden, Australian rules footballer
- John Morden, 1st Baronet, English merchant and philanthropist
- Reid Morden, Canadian public servant
- Robert Morden, British cartographer
- Simon Morden, British author
- Walter Grant Morden, Canadian politician
- Wellington Jeffers Morden, Canadian politician

== See also ==
- Morden (disambiguation)
