= Morden (disambiguation) =

Morden is a district in the London Borough of Merton, England.

Morden may also refer to:

== Places ==
=== Australia ===
- Parish of Morden, a civil parish in New South Wales

=== Canada ===
- Morden, Manitoba, a city in Manitoba
  - Morden (electoral district), a former electoral district centered on that city
- Morden, Nova Scotia, a town in Nova Scotia on the Bay of Fundy

=== United Kingdom ===
- Morden, Dorset, a village in England
- Morden tube station, in London, England
- Ashwell & Morden railway station, near Guilden and Steeple Morden in Cambridgeshire
- Guilden Morden, Cambridgeshire
- Steeple Morden, Cambridgeshire

== People ==
- Morden (surname), people with the surname

=== Fictional characters ===
- Morden (Babylon 5), a fictional character on the television series Babylon 5
- General Morden, the main antagonist of the Metal Slug series of arcade games
- The Morden, an enemy race from the video game Dungeon Siege II

== Entertainment ==
- "Morden", a song by Good Shoes

== Other uses ==
- HMCS Morden, a Canadian Navy corvette in service during World War II
- 14502 Morden, a minor planet
- Ulmus americana 'Morden', an elm cultivar

== See also ==
- Mordon, a village in County Durham, England
- Todmorden, a town in West Yorkshire, England
- Morden station (disambiguation)
