= Alexander MacPherson (explorer) =

Australian explorer (1835–1896)

Alexander MacPherson (1835–96) was on the Burke and Wills expedition support expedition from the Murray River to Coopers Creek, in September 1860.

He and Trouper Lyons became lost in the stoney desert south of Coopers Creek and were saved by a Barkinji guide called Dick. When they became lost and desperately short of provisions and water, Dick conveyed them to the care of local Aborigines (probably relatives) walked for eight days after having run his horse into the ground, and called for help.
