= Mutawintji =

Mutawintji or Mootwingee may refer to:

- Mootwingee County
- Mootwingee Station
- Mutawintji, New South Wales
- Mutawintji National Park
