= Parish of Noonthorangee =

Australia land subsubsubdivision

Noonthorangee located at 30°57′50″S 142°17′53″ is a remote civil parish of Mootwingee County in far North West New South Wales.

== Geography ==
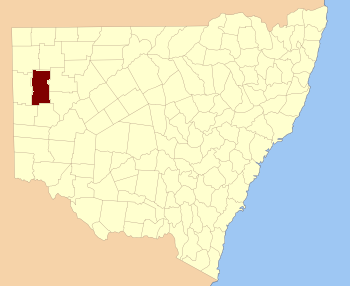
Mootwingee County.

The area includes the Noonthorangee Range. The area around Noonthorangee Range being open range lands, is almost unpopulated, with less than two inhabitants per square kilometre. The parish has a Köppen climate classification of BWh (hot desert).

== History ==
The Parish is on the traditional lands of the Bandjigali speaking Aboriginal peoples.

Charles Sturt passed through the general area during 1845, In 1861 the Burke and Will's expedition camped here on 25 October.

The Mutawintji Road passes through the parish.
