= Parish of Bengoro =

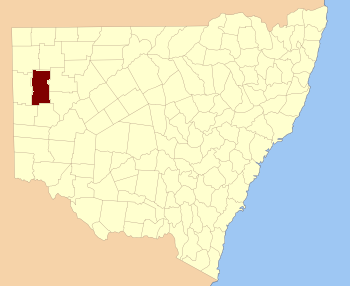
Mootwingee County.

Bengoro located at 31°02′54″S 142°08′20″ is a remote civil parish of Mootwingee County in far North West New South Wales.

The parish is equidistant from Packsaddle, Fowlers Gap and White Cliffs, New South Wales. The parish has a Köppen climate classification of BWh (Hot desert).
