= Parish of Booraboonara =

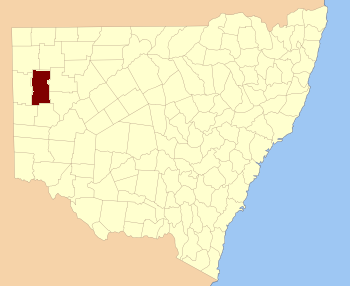
Mootwingee County.

Booraboonara located at 31°25′02″S 141°44′53″E is a remote civil parish of Mootwingee County in far North West New South Wales.

== Geography ==
The Geography, of the Parish is mostly the flat, arid landscape of the Channel Country. The parish has a Köppen climate classification of BWh (Hot desert). The nearest town is Tibooburra to the north and Whitecliffs to the east.

== History ==
The Parish is on the traditional lands of the Bandjigali language Aboriginal peoples.

Charles Sturt passed through the area during 1845, In 1861 the Burke and Will's expedition passed to the east.
