= Parish of Coyurunda =

Civil parish in North West New South Wales

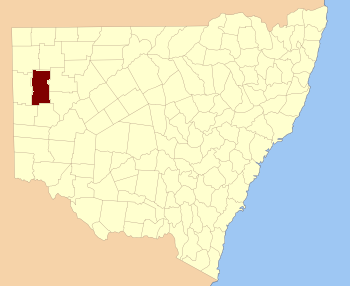
Mootwingee County.

Coyurunda located at 30°46′51″S 141°47′19″ is a remote civil parish of Mootwingee County in far North West New South Wales.

The Geography, of the Parish is mostly the flat, arid scrubland. The parish has a Köppen climate classification of BWh (Hot desert). The parish is midway between White Cliffs, New South Wales and Broken Hill, New South Wales and is on the traditional lands of the Bandjigali language Aboriginal peoples. The parish is on the Silver City Highway in the Bounded Rural Locality of Pack Saddle, New South Wales.
