= Parish of Byngnano =

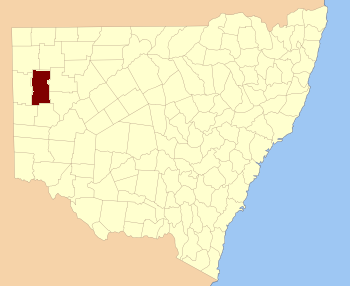
Mootwingee County.

Byngnano located at 31°05′55″S 142°18′50″E is a remote civil parish of Mootwingee County in far North West New South Wales. The Geography, of the Parish is mostly the flat, arid landscape of the Channel Country. The nearest town is Whitecliffs to the east.

The Parish is on the traditional lands of the Bandjigali speaking Aboriginal peoples.

== Geography ==
The parish is located in the Mutawintji National Park.

Byngnano Range is one of the westernmost localities in New South Wales. The nearest ocean is the Southern Ocean about 450 km west-southwest of Byngnano Range. The nearest more populous place is the village of White Cliffs which is 83 km away with a population of around 220 . Byngnano Range is at an altitude of about 386m above sea level. The Byngnano has a Köppen climate classification of BWh (Hot desert).
