= Parish of Bomgadah =

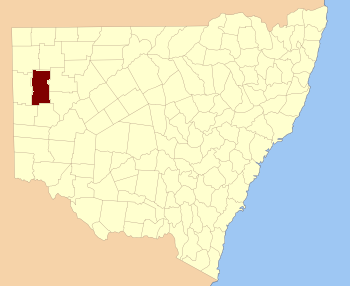
Mootwingee County.

Bomgadah located at 31°25′02″S 141°44′53″ is a remote civil parish of Mootwingee County in far North West New South Wales.

== Geography ==
The Geography, of the Parish is mostly the flat, arid scrubland. The parish has a Köppen climate classification of BWh (Hot desert). The nearest town is Broken Hill, New South Wales. The Parish is on the Silver City Highway, Tibooburra is to the north and Whitecliffs to the east.

The Parish is on the traditional lands of the Bandjigali peoples Aboriginal peoples.
