= Farnell County =

Farnell New South Wales
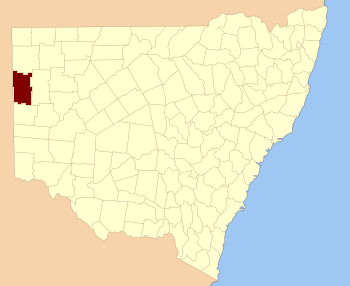
- Location in New South Wales
Lands administrative divisions around Farnell:
South Australia	Evelyn	Mootwingee
South Australia	Farnell	Mootwingee
South Australia	Yancowinna	Mootwingee

Farnell County is one of the 141 cadastral divisions of New South Wales.

Farnell County was named in honour of the Premier of New South Wales James Squire Farnell (1825–1888).

== Parishes within this county ==
A full list of parishes found within this county; their current LGA and mapping coordinates to the approximate centre of each location is as follows:

Parish	LGA	Coordinates
Alberta	Unincorporated	31°23′10″S 141°23′54″E
Avenel	Unincorporated	30°39′16″S 141°04′47″E
Badjerrigarn	Unincorporated	31°12′35″S 141°29′25″E
Bligh	Unincorporated	31°14′39″S 141°30′09″E
Boco	Unincorporated	31°00′51″S 141°12′49″E
Border	Unincorporated	30°30′40″S 141°04′47″E
Brunker	Unincorporated	30°57′16″S 141°04′46″E
Burgess	Unincorporated	30°35′06″S 141°15′32″E
Byjerkerno	Unincorporated	31°25′12″S 141°34′44″E
Campbell	Unincorporated	31°28′22″S 141°05′31″E
Chamberlain	Unincorporated	31°09′52″S 141°13′56″E
Cook	Unincorporated	31°09′58″S 141°21′43″E
Coonbaralba	Unincorporated	31°31′14″S 141°33′20″E
Corona	Unincorporated	31°17′26″S 141°23′59″E
Cultee	Unincorporated	30°56′07″S 141°24′37″E
Dering	Unincorporated	31°27′43″S 141°35′53″E
Floods Creek	Unincorporated	30°51′09″S 141°38′54″E
Fowlers Gap	Unincorporated	31°00′58″S 141°36′01″E
Giles	Unincorporated	30°59′20″S 141°42′07″E
Glenmore	Unincorporated	31°09′43″S 141°04′49″E
Gould	Unincorporated	30°37′04″S 141°28′01″E
Harris	Unincorporated	31°13′48″S 141°14′41″E
Kantappa	Unincorporated	31°20′13″S 141°14′09″E
Mulcatcha	Unincorporated	31°27′34″S 141°14′27″E
Patterson	Unincorporated	31°03′05″S 141°20′06″E
Stanley	Unincorporated	30°47′49″S 141°04′46″E
Sturt	Unincorporated	31°05′48″S 141°28′10″E
Table Top	Unincorporated	30°41′31″S 141°37′18″E
Tanyarto	Unincorporated	31°08′39″S 141°36′52″E
Teilta	Unincorporated	30°52′05″S 141°14′37″E
Torrowangee	Unincorporated	31°28′57″S 141°23′59″E
Wammerra	Unincorporated	30°46′06″S 141°24′49″E
Wonna	Unincorporated	30°41′34″S 141°15′08″E
Yowahro	Unincorporated	31°14′17″S 141°05′38″E
