= Parish of Gooruba =

Gooruba, New South Wales, located at 30°23′56″S 142°11′53″E, is a remote civil parish of Mootwingee County in far North West New South Wales.

== Geography ==
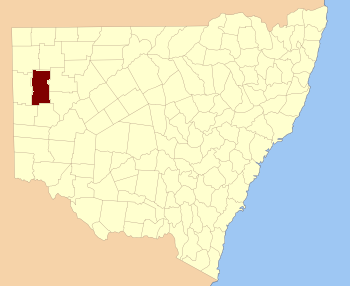
Mootwingee County.

The Geography, of the Parish is mostly a flat, arid landscape although ephemeral lakes are found in the area. The parish has a Köppen climate classification of BWh (Hot desert). The nearest town is Whitecliffs to the east.

== History ==
The Parish is on the traditional lands of the Bandjigali speaking Aboriginal peoples.

Charles Sturt passed through the area during 1845, and in 1861 the Burke and Wills expedition passed nearby.
