= Jack O'Rourke (footballer, born 1899) =

Australian rules footballer

Personal information
- Full name: Ignatius John O'Rourke
- Born: 15 January 1899; Cororooke, Victoria
- Died: 13 May 1969 (aged 70); Richmond, Victoria
- Original team: Kooweerup
- Height: 175 cm (5 ft 9 in)
- Weight: 70 kg (154 lb)

Playing career^{1}
| Years | Club | Games (Goals) |
| 1920–24 | St Kilda | 29 (21) |
| 1925–27 | Fitzroy | 34 (41) |
| Total | | 63 (62) |
- ^{1} Playing statistics correct to the end of 1927.

Ignatius John "Jack" O'Rourke (15 January 1899 – 13 May 1969) was an Australian rules footballer who played with St Kilda and Fitzroy in the Victorian Football League (VFL).

== Family ==
One of the ten children of Joseph Francis O'Rourke (1868-1951), and Maria Mary "Polly" O'Rourke, née Dunne (1867-1933), Ignatius John O'Rourke was born at Cororooke, Victoria on 15 January 1899.

His brother, Frank O'Rourke, played for Carlton and Fitzroy.

He married Beryl Josine Morden (1901-1996) in 1926. Both their sons, John Brian "Jack" O'Rourke (1928-2008) and Basil Joseph O'Rourke (1930-2017), played for Richmond in the VFL.

His brother-in-law, Jim Morden played for St Kilda, and another brother-in-law, Clem Morden, played for St Kilda and for Collingwood in the VFL.

== Football ==
=== Horsham (WDFA) ===
He was granted a clearance to the Horsham Football Club in the Wimmera District Football Association in 1928.
