= Parish of Peppora =

Peppora is a station in west New South Wales about 440 km east-northeast of Adelaide, and about 800 km west of Sydney. Peppora is at an altitude of approximately 57m. Peppora is one of the westernmost homesteads in New South Wales. Peppora Stations is the traditional land of the Barkindji people.

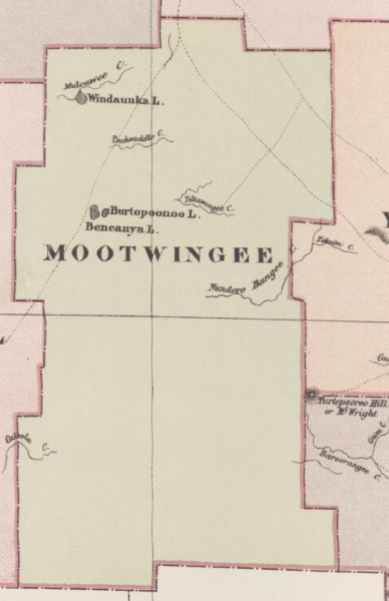
Mootwingee County from Johns Sands 1886 map.

The civil parish of Peppora is located at 30°56′42″S 142°02′07″E. in Mootwingee County and is almost unpopulated, with less than two inhabitants per square kilometre. The parish has a Köppen climate classification of BWh (hot desert).
