= Parish of Langawirra =

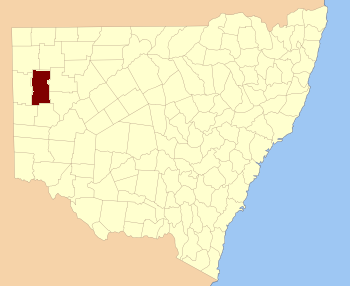
Mootwingee County.

Langawirra is a remote civil parish of Mootwingee County in far North West New South Wales.

== Geography ==
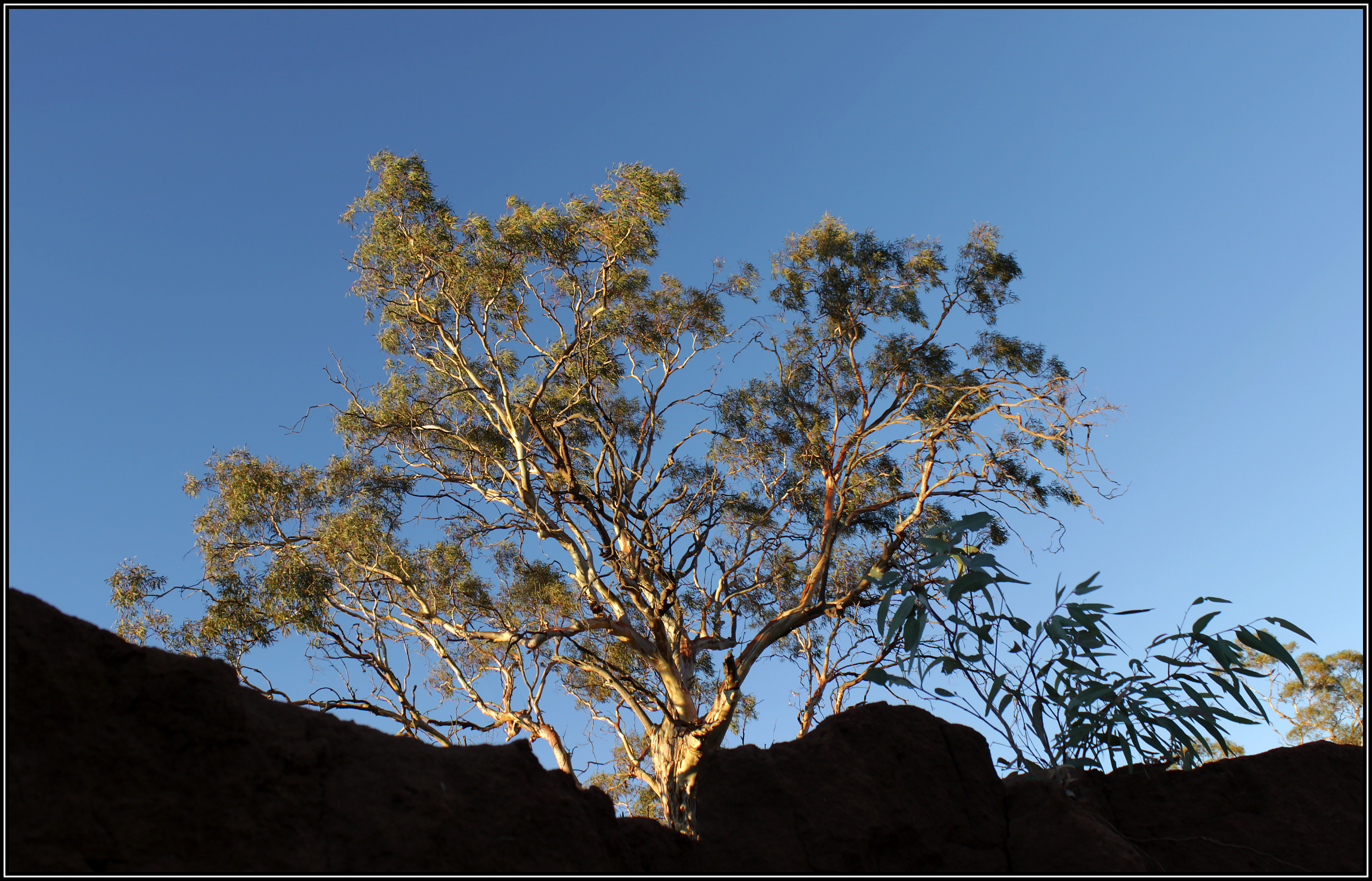
Landscape of Langawirra Parish

The geography of the parish is mostly a flat, arid landscape, although ephemeral lakes are found in the parish. The parish has a Köppen climate classification of BWh (Hot desert). The nearest town is Broken Hill to the south and Whitecliffs to the east.

The Parish is on the traditional lands of the Bandjigali Aboriginal peoples.

Langawirra is located at 31°21′25″S 142°06′18″E.
