= Knox and Downs store =

Knox and Downs was a store in located at 44 Reid St on the corner of Myers St in Wilcannia, New South Wales in far western New South Wales. In 2002, the heritage listed building was extensively damaged by fire. In 2016 it was announced that the building would be repurposed as a cultural centre. A$3.5 million had been committed by the New South Wales government to construct the Baaka Cultural Centre, which will be a home to the largest collection of Barkindji history, art and cultural pieces found in Australia. Engineers assessed the remains of the building in 2016 and found that most of the external walls, including the verandah, of the existing building could be restored.

It was an important hardware store that serviced the port of Wilcannia during the late 1800s and early 1900s. It was built in 1899 of local sandstone, as are many historic buildings found in Wilcannia.
