= Koorningbirry =

Rural locality and civil parish of Mootwingee County, New South Wales, Australia

Koorningbirry located at 30°23′56″S 142°11′53″E is a remote rural locality and civil parish of Mootwingee County in far northwest New South Wales.

== Geography ==
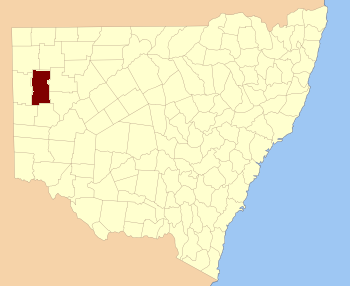
Mootwingee County.

The geography of the Parish is mostly a flat, arid landscape. The nearest town is Tibooburra to the north and Whitecliffs to the east.

The Little Koorningbirry Range is within the parish.

== History ==
The Parish is on the traditional lands of the Bandjigali language Aboriginal peoples. Charles Sturt passed through the area during 1845, In 1861 the Burke and Will's expedition passed to the east.
