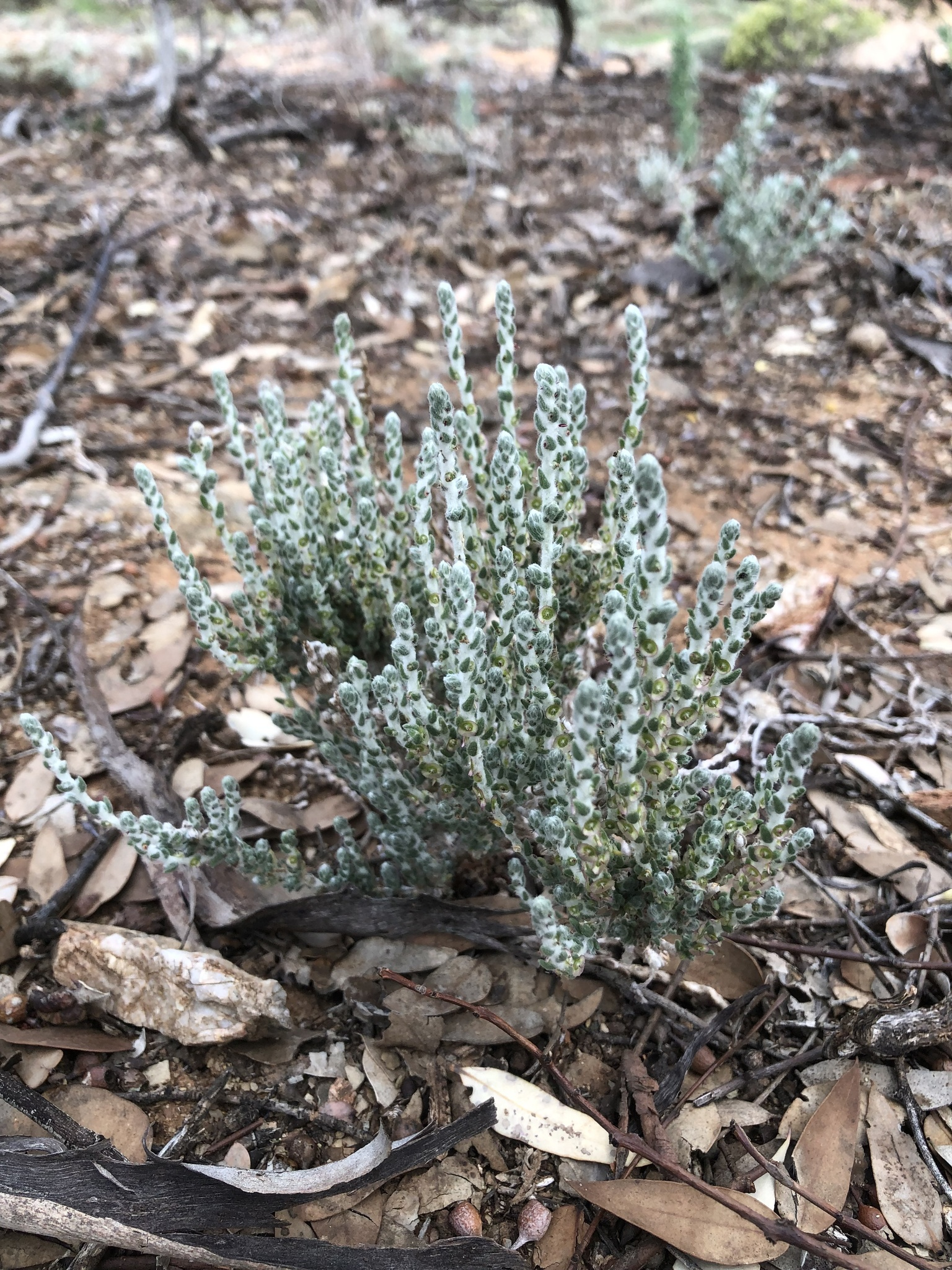
- Near Fowlers Gap

Scientific classification
- Kingdom: Plantae
- Clade: Tracheophytes
- Clade: Angiosperms
- Clade: Eudicots
- Order: Caryophyllales
- Family: Amaranthaceae
- Genus: Maireana
- Species: M. ovata

Binomial name
- Maireana ovata (Ising) Paul G. Wilson

Synonyms
- Kochia ovata Ising

= Maireana ovata =

Species of shrub

Maireana ovata is a species of flowering plant in the family Amaranthaceae and is endemic to central Australia. It is a small, densely branched shrub with densely woolly branches, narrowly egg-shaped to broadly triangular leaves, bisexual flowers and a fruiting perianth with a translucent wing.

== Description ==
Maireana ovata is a densely branched shrub that typically grows to a height of up to 30 cm (12 in) and has densely woolly branches. The leaves are arranged alternately, narrowly egg-shaped to broadly triangular, mostly 2–5 mm (0.079–0.197 in) long and loosely covered with woolly hairs. The flowers are bisexual, the fruiting perianth small and pale yellow when dry, with a hemispherical tube 1 mm (0.039 in) high and 1.5 mm (0.059 in) in diameter. The wing is translucent, 4–6 mm (0.16–0.24 in) in diameter.

== Taxonomy ==
This species was first formally described in 1955 by Ernest Horace Ising, who gave it the name Kochia ovata in the Transactions of the Royal Society of South Australia from specimens he collected at Evelyn Downs, 90 mi (140 km) south-east of Oodnadatta in 1952. In 1975, Paul G. Wilson transferred the species to Maireana as M. ovata in the journal Nuytsia. The specific epithet (ovata) means 'ovate'.

== Distribution and habitat ==
Maireana ovata is found in central Australia where it grows on sandy rises and the eroded slopes of stony hills in the south of the Northern Territory, central South Australia and the Western Plains of New South Wales.

== Conservation status ==
Maireana ovata is listed as "near threatened" under the Northern Territory Territory Parks and Wildlife Conservation Act.
