= Myles Archibald Lyons =

Australian policeman (1823–1899)

- Born: Swan Hill, Victoria, Australia
- Died: Eltham, Victoria, Australia
- Occupation: Mounted police trooper
- Years active: c. 1860s–1889
- Known for: Burke and Wills expedition despatch rider; early Victoria colonial policing

Myles Archibald Lyons (1823–99) was a Mounted Police Trooper stationed at Swan Hill, Victoria. He was on the Burke and Wills expedition from the Murray River to Coopers Creek, in September 1860.

He and Alexander MacPherson became lost in the desert and were saved by a Barkinji guide called Dick.

Dick accompanied Trooper Lyons and Alexander MacPherson when they set out from Menindie to convey despatches to Burke. When they became lost and desperately short of provisions and water, Dick conveyed them to the care of local Aborigines. He then returned to camp, walking for eight days after having run his horse into the ground.

Lyons died in Eltham, Victoria on 19 August 1899, aged 75.
