= Parish of Kayrunnera =

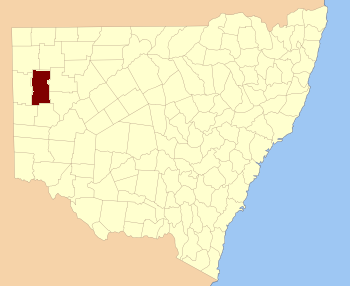
Mootwingee County.

Kayrunnera located at 30.680278°S 142.401389°E is a remote civil parish of Mootwingee County in far North West New South Wales.

The Geography, of the Parish is mostly a flat, arid landscape. The parish has a Köppen climate classification of BWh (Hot desert).
