= Frederic Bonney =

British landowner and photographer

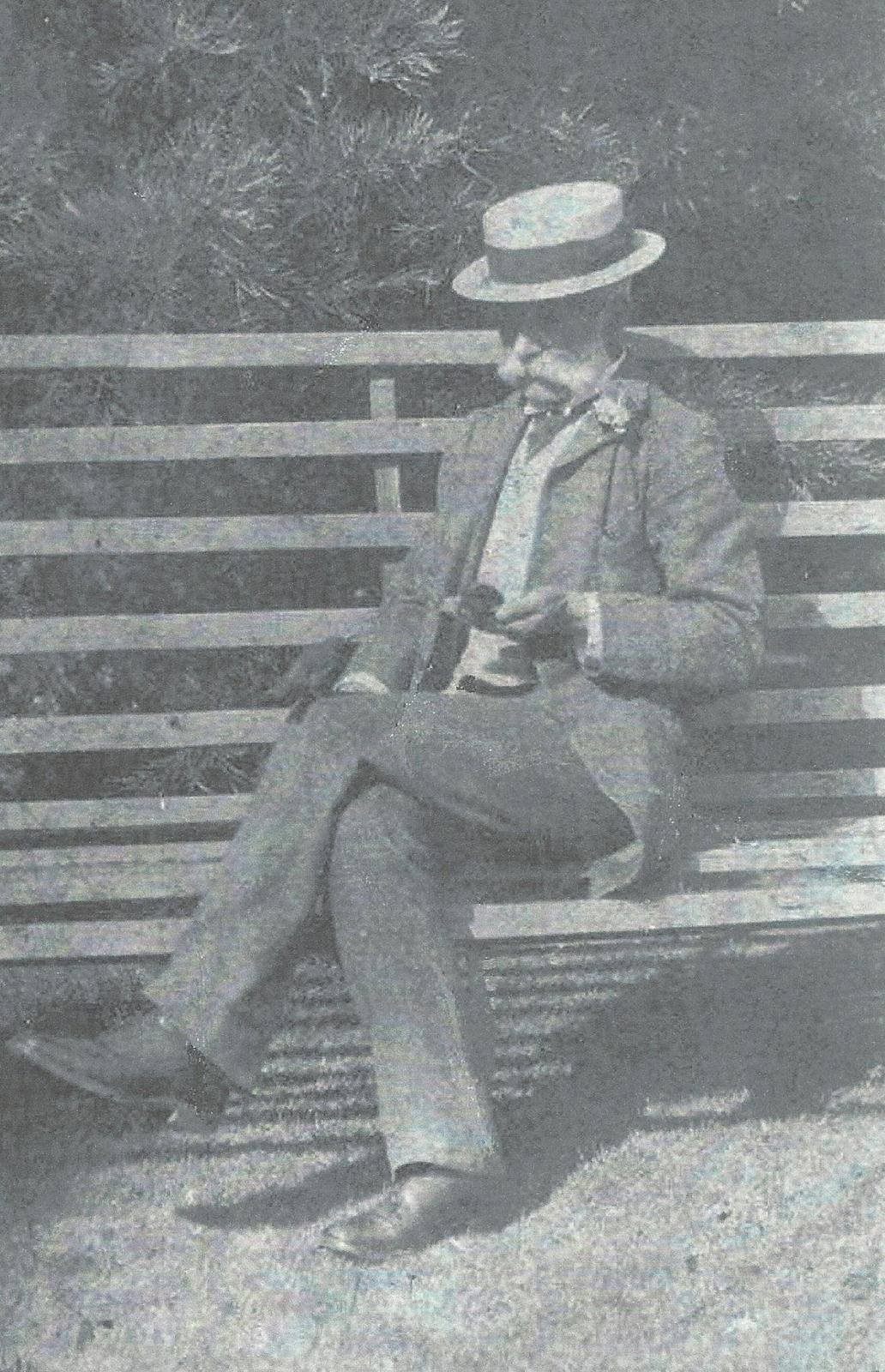
- Self portrait c.1915 with a robin eating from his hand
- Born: 1842; Rugeley, Staffordshire, England, United Kingdom
- Died: 1921 (aged 78–79); Rugeley, Staffordshire, England, United Kingdom
- Education: Marlborough College
- Known for: Photography, anthropology

Frederic Bonney (1842–1921) was a British landowner and photographer. He took photographs at Momba Station in New South Wales in the 1870s and he was known for these and his anthropology. He was born and died in Rugeley, Staffordshire.

== Life ==
Bonney was the son of the Reverend Thomas Bonney, headmaster of Rugeley Grammar School. His brothers included Edward Smith Bonney and Thomas George Bonney, who was an academic geologist. He went to school at Marlborough College. His uncle, Charles Bonney, visited England from Australia in 1858 to 1862. Encouraged by his uncle, he and his brother, Edward, travelled to Australia.

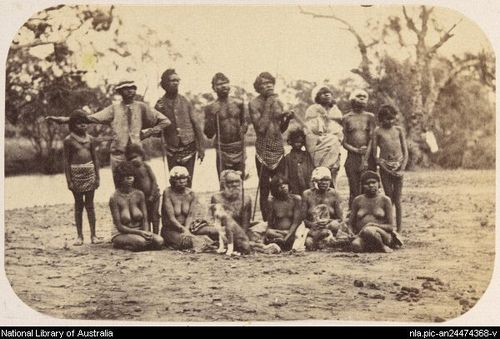
Aborigines at Momba Station by Bonney in the 1870s. Front row (left to right): Jenny (Kalthi Tommy's woman), child, Mary Momba, Old Peter, Polly (Jerry's woman), Wonko Mary and Jenny (who later became George's woman). Back row: Jeannie, Billy, Penchey Martin, Ogle-eyed Johnny, Hughey, Panga (boy), Hughey’s woman, Old Mary and Nora.

Edward went to Australia first and Frederic joined him in 1865 at Momba Station in New South Wales, near Wilcannia. In the late 1860s Momba had an area of 6,000 square kilometres (2,317 sq mi). Charles Dickens' son, Plorn, was sent by his father to Momba Station and he arrived a few days before his sixteenth birthday in 1868. He worked as a stockman at Momba until 1872.

Bonney's occupation was as a grazier but his hobby was photography and anthropology. He took many pictures of the Paakantyi people who had traditionally lived along the Paroo River. These people had been devastated by disease and the invasion by foreign immigrants. Bonney's attitude to these people was not as judgmental as many and he took natural pictures which recorded their lives. He was shocked by the racist views of others and he recorded his respect for the "loyalty and integrity" of the native Australians. Bonney's pictures have been published recently and in his time they were exhibited at the Melbourne Exhibition in 1880. Bonney's pictures of Wonko Mary record a mourning tradition—Wonko Mary is shown with a "widow's cap" which she has made from gypsum (kopi) and water, and has moulded to her head.

Edward became ill with terminal syphilis and he returned home in 1879. Frederic had to tidy up their affairs but he also took the opportunity to complete his anthropological and photographic studies. Frederic sold Momba station and he returned to Staffordshire in 1881. He travelled back the long way and he visited Hawaii where he again took photographs during a month there.

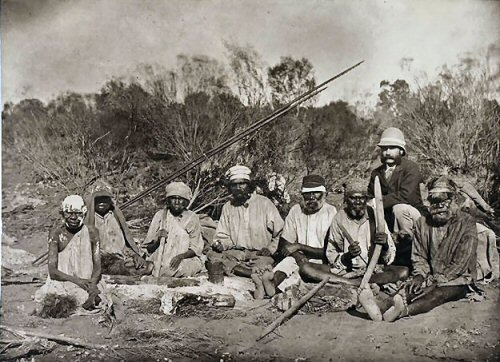
Frederic Bonney in Australia. Bonney is in the pith helmet, Old Peter is on the right, Wonko Mary is on the far left wearing an unusual mourning cap. Another man is holding a boomerang and a short throwing stick (known as a kutjurru).

Once he was back in his home county he bought Colton House in Rugeley. He established gardens and an arboretum at his house. He continued to record local events using photography (many of these pictures are held in a collection at Colton House). He became chair of the parish council and bred show pigeons. Bonney also volunteered to manage his local hospital and the village reading room.

== Legacy ==
Bonney recorded some important images through his enthusiasm for photography. Some of his original images have been lost, but his work has been published in two books and they include photographs of the Paakantyi people. Unusually for his time, he wrote the people's names on the back of his photographs, and these can be cross-referenced to his notebooks. This information can reveal connections to Paakantyi families living today.

=== Photographs ===
Bonney's Australian photographs are held in the State Library of NSW (Mitchell Library) and the Australian National Library, and Colton House holds another collection. His collection of Australian artefacts were kept at his house in England and some of these later went into collections at the University of Cambridge.

=== Manuscripts ===
Bonney's important manuscript notebooks, and a copy of his published article, 'On some customs of the Aborigines of the River Darling, New South Wales', were donated to the Mitchell Library in 1924. This paper is still cited.

A book, People of the Paroo, by Jeannette Hope and Robert Lindsay, has been published, containing all Bonney's surviving Australian pictures. Some of these have only recently been identified.
