= Parish of Tucinyah =

Australian civil parish

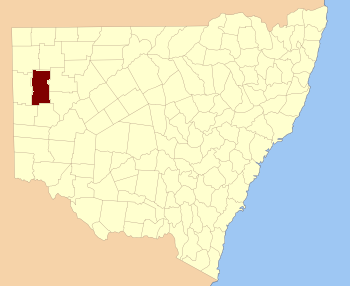
Mootwingee County.

Tucinyah is a remote civil parish of Mootwingee County in far North West New South Wales.

Tucinyah is located at 30.778333°S 141.929444°E in Far West New South Wales, is almost unpopulated, with less than two inhabitants per square kilometre. The parish has a Köppen climate classification of BWh (hot desert).
