= Frank O'Rourke (Australian rules footballer) =

Australian rules footballer, born 1906

Personal information
- Full name: Francis Joseph O'Rourke
- Born: 21 January 1906; Colac, Victoria
- Died: 7 March 1978 (aged 72); Warrnambool, Victoria
- Original team: Koroit
- Height: 170 cm (5 ft 7 in)
- Weight: 67 kg (148 lb)

Playing career^{1}
Years	Club	Games (Goals)
1931–32	Carlton	22 (4)
1933	Fitzroy	7 (2)
1934	Preston (VFA)	1 (0)
1934	Port Melbourne (VFA)	6 (7)
- ^{1} Playing statistics correct to the end of 1934.

Francis Joseph O'Rourke (21 January 1906 – 7 March 1978) was an Australian rules footballer who played with Carlton and Fitzroy in the Victorian Football League (VFL).

== Family ==
One of the ten children of Joseph Francis O'Rourke (1868–1951), and Maria Mary "Polly" O'Rourke, née Dunne (1867–1933), Francis Joseph O'Rourke was born in Colac, Victoria on 21 January 1906.

His older brother, Jack O'Rourke, played for St Kilda and Fitzroy.
