= Parish of Teltawongee =

Teltawongee is a remote civil parish located at 30.673056°S 141.952778°E in Mootwingee County western New South Wales.

The area is semi arid and major features of the Parish include Pancannia Lake and Packsaddle Creek. It gives its name to the Teltawongee beds, geological formation. the parish is almost unpopulated, with less than two inhabitants per square kilometre. The parish has a Köppen climate classification of BWh (hot desert).

The parish is east of the Silver City Highway, and the nearest settlement is Packsaddle, New South Wales 2 km to the north.
