= Clem Morden =

Australian rules footballer (1907–1987)

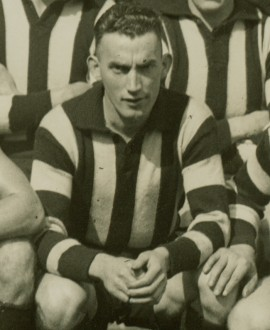
- Morden in 1932

Personal information
- Full name: Clemence Edward Morden
- Born: 22 May 1907; Korumburra, Victoria
- Died: 26 March 1987 (aged 79)
- Original team: Port Melbourne CYMS (CYMSFA)
- Height: 169 cm (5 ft 7 in)
- Weight: 68 kg (150 lb)

Playing career^{1}
Years	Club	Games (Goals)
1928–32	St Kilda	18 (1)
1932	Collingwood	3 (0)
Total		21 (1)
- ^{1} Playing statistics correct to the end of 1932.

Clemence Edward Morden (22 May 1907 – 26 March 1987) was a former Australian rules footballer who played with St Kilda and Collingwood in the Victorian Football League (VFL).

Morden was captain-coach of South Ballarat Football Club's 1934 Ballarat Wimmera Football League's premiership side.

== Family ==
The son of John Patrick Morden, and Honora Morden, née O'Brien, Clemence Edward Morden was born at Korumburra, Victoria, on 22 May 1907.

His brother, Jim Morden, played for St Kilda in the VFL, and his brother-in-law, Jack O'Rourke, played with St Kilda and Fitzroy in the VFL.

He married Nancy Adelaide Forbes (1912–1973) in 1934.
