= Parish of Kara =

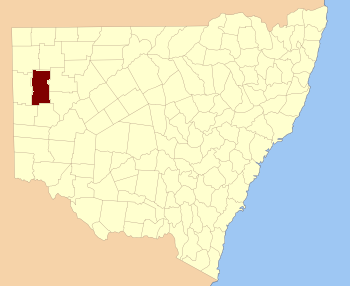
Mootwingee County.

Kara Parish (located at 30°49′24″S 142°24′41″) is a remote civil parish of Mootwingee County in far North West New South Wales. The parish is on Mutawintji Road outside Mutawintji National Park and has mostly a flat, arid landscape. The parish has a Köppen climate classification of BWh (Hot desert).
