= Parish of Maropinna =

Parish in Australia

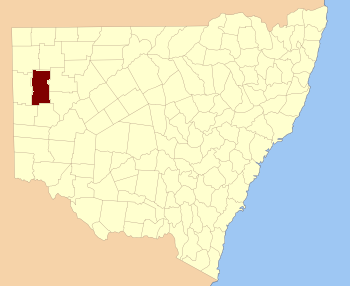
Mootwingee County.

Maropinna, New South Wales is a remote civil parish of Mootwingee County in far North West New South Wales.

The parish is located at 31°01′30″S 141°59′22″E and the nearest town is White Cliffs, New South Wales to the east, but the parish is on the Silver City Highway north of Broken Hill, New South Wales.

The geography of the Parish is mostly a flat, arid landscape. The parish has a Köppen climate classification of BWh (Hot desert).
