= Momba Station =

Pastoral lease and sheep station in New South Wales

Coordinates: 30.976°S 143.5°E

Location in New South Wales

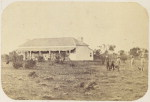
Momba House at Momba Station

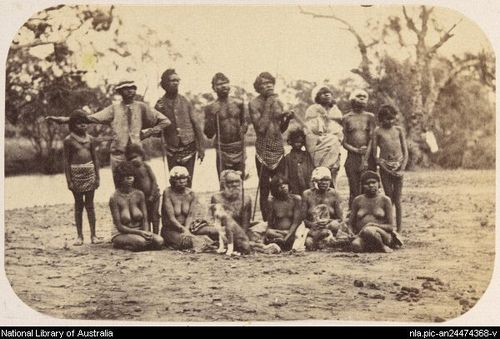
Aborigines at Momba Station by Frederic Bonney in the 1870s

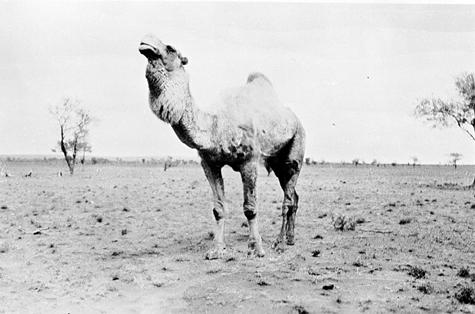
Wild dromedaries at Momba Station in about 1935

Momba Station is a pastoral lease that operates as a sheep station in New South Wales. The property is situated approximately 42 kilometres (26 mi) south east of White Cliffs and 66 kilometres (41 mi) north east of Wilcannia.

== History ==
Momba Station on the Paroo River and the Darling River was established by the brothers Edward and Frederic Bonney. Frederic arrived in 1865 to join his brother after both of them had been attracted to the country by their uncle, Charles Bonney. Frederic Bonney sold the station and went back to the United Kingdom in 1881 due to his brother's poor health. Bonney however recorded some important anthropology through his writing and his enthusiasm for photography. Some of his original images were lost, but his work has been published in two books and they include photographs of the Paakantyi. These were the Aboriginal people who lived near the Paroo river who became labourers on the station.

In the late 1860s the property occupied an area of 6,000 square kilometres (2,317 sq mi). Charles Dickens' son, Plorn, was withdrawn from school and he was at Momba Station a few days before his sixteenth birthday in 1868. He worked as a stockman at Momba in the late 1860s to 1872 when he established Yanda Station.

By 1883 the owners had spent £102,080 on improvements at both Momba and Mount Murchison. In 1884 the property occupied an area of 8,480 square kilometres (3,274 sq mi), and was the largest grazing property in New South Wales. At the time it extended 140 kilometres (87 mi) north from the Darling River at Wilcannia and was 100 kilometres (62 mi) wide. It was owned by the Momba Pastoral Company, the principals of which later formed Elders.

From 1902 Momba was successively subdivided. Peter Waite owned the property in 1906 when he and other pastoralists in the area formed the Pastoralists' Association of West Darling.

Momba was advertised in 1913 with a total area of 6,640 square kilometres (2,564 sq mi) and carrying a flock of 55,000 sheep, 44 cattle and 154 horses. At his time the property had approximately 100 miles (161 km) of double frontage to the Darling River including the flood plains and wetlands of the Paroo River. It was most likely purchased by Joseph Timms who owned the property in 1917. Timms disposed of 100,000 sheep to Ben Chaffey of Moorna Station. Later the same year, Timms sold of a 500,000 acres (202,343 ha) portion of the station to Messrs King and Allison of Wilcannia.

In 1924 the station was put up for auction by Timms and Sidney Kidman as part of an aggregation of over 1.4 million acres. Momba with an area of 658,000 acres (266,000 ha), Mount Murchison with 336,000 acres (135,974 ha), Purnanga with 381,000 acres (154,185 ha), and two smaller leases which all had a combined carrying capacity of approximately 100,000 sheep.

Struck by drought in 1927, the property had been carrying 9,000 head of cattle but only 2,000 were expected to survive.

In 1950 the remainder of the property was divided into ten leases including Peery, Mandalay and Arrowbar.

== The station today ==
Tom Brinkworth acquired Momba at some point prior to 2006. He also owns the 455 square kilometres (176 sq mi) Duntroon, the adjacent property Mena Murtee, Goorimpa on the Paroo, Ulalie and Bon View Stations. Since then the Brinkworth family has also acquired the properties Kalkaroo, Annalara, Wild Duck, Tillenbury, Purnawilla, Bimpero and Gumbalara to add to the Watervalley Pty Ltd portfolio of Western NSW holdings.

== See also ==
- List of ranches and stations
