= Morden station (disambiguation) =

Morden station may mean one of the following stations in Morden, in south-west London:

Current stations:

- Morden tube station - a London Underground station
- Morden South railway station, on the Thameslink line

Closed or unbuilt stations

- Morden Road railway station - a closed station built by the Wimbledon and Croydon Railway, originally named "Morden" and then "Morden Halt"
- Morden tube station (District Railway), also known as "South Morden", an unbuilt station planned by the Wimbledon and Sutton Railway
