= Mootwingee County =

Mootwingee New South Wales
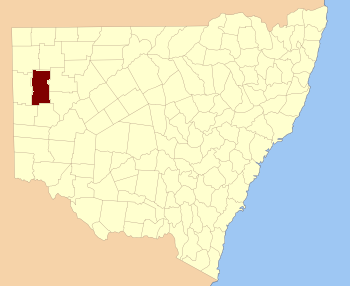
- Location in New South Wales
Lands administrative divisions around Mootwingee:
Evelyn	Yantara	Yantara
Farnell	Mootwingee	Yungnulgra
Yancowinna	Tandora	Young

Mootwingee County, New South Wales is one of the 141 cadastral divisions of New South Wales.

Mootwingee is believed to be derived from a local Aboriginal word and is also the name of a nearby pastoral station. It is now a part of Mutawintji National Park; and a landmark for the aboriginal people.

== Parishes ==
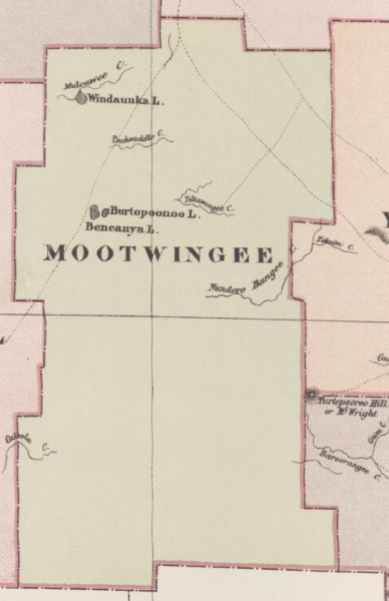
Mootwingee County, in a map from the Johns Sands 1886 Atlas of Australia.

The parishes found within this county do not fall within the Local Government Area, as the county lies within the Unincorporated Far West Region. A full list of the county's parishes and mapping coordinates to the approximate centre of each location is as follows:

Parish	LGA	Coordinates
Bengoro	Unincorporated	31°02′54″S 142°08′20″E
Bimpia	Unincorporated	30°47′21″S 142°03′46″E
Bomgadah	Unincorporated	31°25′02″S 141°44′53″E
Booraboonara	Unincorporated	30°31′47″S 142°14′20″E
Boorla	Unincorporated	30°58′06″S 141°51′33″E
Byngnano	Unincorporated	31°05′55″S 142°18′50″E
Campbell	Unincorporated	unknown
Coyurunda	Unincorporated	30°46′51″S 141°47′19″E
Donnelly	Unincorporated	31°23′25″S 141°54′06″E
Forrest	Unincorporated	31°05′36″S 141°49′28″E
Fort Otway	Unincorporated	31°03′13″S 142°18′50″E
Gairdners Creek	Unincorporated	31°32′33″S 141°43′23″E
Gooruba	Unincorporated	30°52′42″S 142°09′13″E
Kara	Unincorporated	30°49′24″S 142°24′41″E
Kayrunnera	Unincorporated	30°40′49″S 142°24′05″E
Koonburra	Unincorporated	31°27′01″S 142°20′09″E
Koorningbirry	Unincorporated	30°23′56″S 142°11′53″E
Lachlan	Unincorporated	30°31′55″S 142°05′03″E
Langawirra	Unincorporated	31°21′25″S 142°06′18″E
Maropinna	Unincorporated	31°01′30″S 141°59′22″E
Morden	Unincorporated	30°29′53″S 142°24′08″E
Mulcawee	Unincorporated	30°52′19″S 141°53′17″E
Munye	Unincorporated	31°33′21″S 141°56′10″E
Noonthorangee	Unincorporated	30°57′50″S 142°17′53″E
Nootumbulla	Unincorporated	31°14′09″S 142°19′29″E
Peppora	Unincorporated	30°56′42″S 142°02′07″E
Rowena	Unincorporated	31°13′01″S 142°09′56″E
Saladin	Unincorporated	unknown
Sturts Meadows	Unincorporated	31°18′17″S 141°53′13″E
Teegarraara	Unincorporated	31°12′29″S 141°48′12″E
Teltawongee	Unincorporated	30°40′23″S 141°57′10″E
Tirlta	Unincorporated	30°47′21″S 142°10′12″E
Truganini	Unincorporated	30°26′17″S 142°04′34″E
Tucinyah	Unincorporated	30°46′42″S 141°55′46″E
Waverley	Unincorporated	31°24′17″S 142°19′43″E
Windaunka	Unincorporated	30°30′55″S 141°50′31″E
Woodstock	Unincorporated	31°05′58″S 142°07′46″E
Woonunga	Unincorporated	31°29′22″S 142°07′09″E
Yangimulla	Unincorporated	30°33′20″S 141°57′28″E
