= Jeannette Hope =

Australian archeologist

Jeannette Hope is an Australian archaeologist who has worked extensively in Western New South Wales. She is a former editor and executive of the journal of the Australian Archaeological Association, and has published extensively on that region and issues of gender in archaeology. She did her Bachelor of Science and PhD at Monash University and has been an honorary research associate at the University of Sydney. She also has prepared the seminal work on the Aboriginal fish traps at Brewarrina, New South Wales.

== Publications ==
- The People of the Paroo River: Frederick Bonney’s Photographs by Jeannette Hope and Robert Lindsay. Department of Environment, Climate Change and Water NSW, Sydney South, 2012
- ‘'Cultural Heritage of the Lake Victoria Rangelands’', River Junction Research. Unpublished report with Shawcross W, Orchard K and Quinlan D 2002, for the Lake Victoria Rangelands Management Action Plan, Wentworth, NSW.
- Lake Victoria: finding the balance—a response to the competing interests of cultural heritage, environment and resource use, Background Report No. 1, Murray-Darling Basin Commission, Canberra. 1998.
- Redefining Archaeology: Feminist Perspectives: Feminist Perspectives, Research Papers in Archaeology and Natural History No 29, contributors Mary et al. Casey, Sharon Wellfare, Jeannette Hope and others
- "Aboriginal Burials and Shell Middens at Snaggy Bend and Other Sites on the Central Murray River" Australian Archaeology No. 20 (Jun. 1985), pp. 68–89 by Peter Clark and Jeannette Hope
