= Noonthorangee Range =

Mountain range in Australia

Coordinates: 30°50′S 142°20′E

Noonthorangee Range is a mountain range in New South Wales, Australia, about 800 km northwest of Canberra. The range reaches 199 m above sea level.

The area around Noonthorangee Range being open range lands, is almost unpopulated, with less than two inhabitants per square kilometre. In the neighborhood there is a hot desert climate. The annual average temperature is 22 °C. The warmest month is January, when the average temperature is 34 °C, and the coldest is June, at 10 °C.

The average annual rainfall is 278 millimetres. The wettest month is February, with an average of 67 mm of rainfall; the driest is October, averaging 1 mm.
