= Parish of Morden =

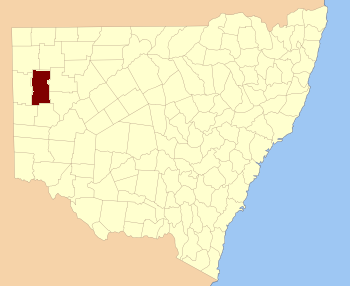
Mootwingee County.

Morden located at 30°29′53″S 142°24′08″ is a remote civil parish of Mootwingee County in far North West New South Wales.

The geography of the Parish is mostly a flat, arid landscape. The parish has a Köppen climate classification of BWh (Hot desert).
