= Fowlers Gap Arid Zone Research Station =

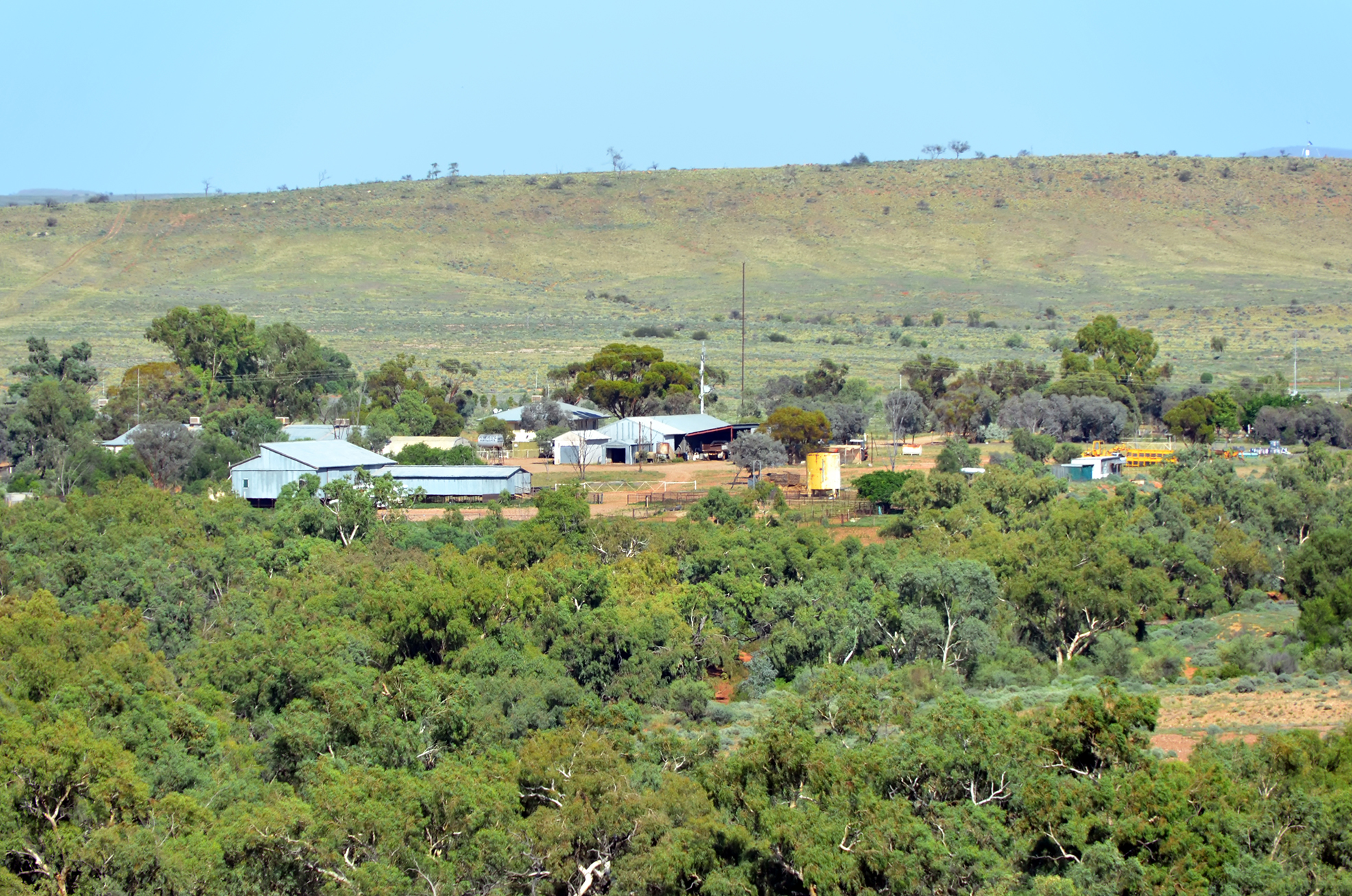
- Overview of the station

- Coordinates: 31°05′25″S 141°42′30″E
- Country: Australia
- State: New South Wales
- City: Fowlers Gap
- Location: 112 km (70 mi) north of Broken Hill

Area
  - Total: 38,888 ha (96,090 acres)
- Elevation: 181 m (594 ft)
- County: Mootwingee
- Parish: Hume
- Mean max temp: 26.9 °C (80.4 °F)
- Mean min temp: 13.0 °C (55.4 °F)
- Annual rainfall: 231.4 mm (9.11 in)
- Website: Fowlers Gap Arid Zone Research Station

Designations

Register of the National Estate
- Official name: Fowlers Gap Field Station
- Type: Natural
- Criteria: C1.
- Designated: 28 May 1996
- Reference no.: 19186

The Fowlers Gap Arid Zone Research Station is teaching and research facility, established by the UNSW Australia (UNSW), which is located in the Australian state of New South Wales. in Fowlers Gap in the far north-west of the state. The station is located about 112 kilometres (70 mi) north of Broken Hill. It occupies Western Lands Lease No. 10194, an area of 38,888 hectares (96,090 acres), and has been used by scientists in fields ranging from zoology to agriculture, palaeontology and environmental science. The facility has also hosted art and design students on field trips from the university, using purpose-built facilities, including studios.

== Features ==
The property has been held since 1966 by the UNSW on a lease in perpetuity. It is administered by the UNSW Faculty of Science.The lease enables studies of the arid-zone environment, particularly in relation to impacts on the pastoral industry. Fowlers Gap is the only research station in the arid zone of New South Wales. Areas have been monitored and data collected continuously, in some cases for over 30 years. With a varied collection of meeting places, dormitories, cottages and camping sites it can handle reasonably large visiting groups and small conferences. Research has been conducted there by schools and units of UNSW, including Biological, Earth & Environmental Sciences, Civil and Environmental Engineering, College of Fine Arts, the Faculty of Built Environment, the Centre for Photovoltaic Engineering and the Centre for Remote Sensing and GIS.

A condition of the lease is that UNSW provides facilities for any reasonable research program proposed by other university and government organisations. They include Macquarie University, University of Sydney, University of Newcastle, University of New England, the University of Adelaide, the Australian National University, Monash University, Melbourne University and La Trobe University. Two Cooperative Research Centres, Sustainable Tourism and Landscape Evolution & Mineral Exploration, have conducted research. Government organisations that have utilised the facilities include: the former Soil Conservation Service of New South Wales (now part of the Department of Infrastructure, Planning and Natural Resources), NSW Agriculture (now part of the Department of Primary Industries), Queensland DPI, SA Department of Agriculture, NSW Department of Environment and Conservation and several divisions of CSIRO. Funding to support research has been provided by the University of New South Wales, Australian Research Council, Wool Research Trust Fund, Australian Wool Innovation, Meat and Livestock Australia, Rural Credits Development Fund, Water Research Foundation of Australia, Australian Housing Research Council, Cooperative Research Centre for Sustainable Tourism and a number of overseas governments and universities.

As well as research, Fowlers Gap is used extensively for teaching, largely by way of student field excursions from UNSW and other educational institutions also visit the station. The Station attracts visitors from overseas and within Australia and has been the subject of television documentaries and newspaper articles. It has abundant wildlife, grand scenery, varied geology and terrain, and a rich human history that includes significant indigenous sites, including a stone tool quarry, and artefacts from decades of scientific research. It has natural waterholes and ephemeral creeks. Several large dams provide permanent surface water even in severe droughts. Sheep grazing provides a supplementary income.

The Station is administered by a Management Committee consisting of representatives from UNSW users, assisted by two advisory groups - the Graziers Committee, comprising a small group of pastoralists who supply support and advice at an informal level, and the Consultative Committee, an advisory group representing organisations of the pastoral industry, natural resource management agencies and CSIRO.

== Geography ==
=== Climate ===
Fowlers Gap has a subtropical desert climate (Köppen: BWh) with very hot, slightly wetter summers and mild, very dry winters. Extreme temperatures ranged from 49.1 °C (120.4 °F) on 27 and 31 January 2026 to −3.6 °C (25.5 °F) on 15 July 2018. The wettest recorded day was 4 March 2020 with 120.8 mm (4.76 in) of rainfall.

Climate data for Fowlers Gap (31.09°S 141.70°E) (181 m (594 ft) AMSL) (2004-2025)
| Month | Jan | Feb | Mar | Apr | May | Jun | Jul | Aug | Sep | Oct | Nov | Dec | Year |
|---|---|---|---|---|---|---|---|---|---|---|---|---|---|
| Record high °C (°F) | 49.1 (120.4) | 45.9 (114.6) | 43.2 (109.8) | 38.0 (100.4) | 29.8 (85.6) | 27.2 (81.0) | 27.6 (81.7) | 32.3 (90.1) | 38.3 (100.9) | 41.4 (106.5) | 46.2 (115.2) | 45.8 (114.4) | 49.1 (120.4) |
| Mean daily maximum °C (°F) | 36.6 (97.9) | 34.9 (94.8) | 31.5 (88.7) | 26.4 (79.5) | 21.0 (69.8) | 17.2 (63.0) | 17.2 (63.0) | 19.8 (67.6) | 24.1 (75.4) | 28.2 (82.8) | 31.1 (88.0) | 34.3 (93.7) | 26.9 (80.4) |
| Mean daily minimum °C (°F) | 22.3 (72.1) | 20.7 (69.3) | 17.9 (64.2) | 12.8 (55.0) | 8.0 (46.4) | 5.3 (41.5) | 4.4 (39.9) | 5.8 (42.4) | 9.3 (48.7) | 13.3 (55.9) | 16.7 (62.1) | 19.8 (67.6) | 13.0 (55.4) |
| Record low °C (°F) | 12.0 (53.6) | 11.0 (51.8) | 6.3 (43.3) | 2.1 (35.8) | −1.9 (28.6) | −3.0 (26.6) | −3.6 (25.5) | −1.9 (28.6) | 0.9 (33.6) | 4.7 (40.5) | 6.3 (43.3) | 10.3 (50.5) | −3.6 (25.5) |
| Average precipitation mm (inches) | 34.7 (1.37) | 18.3 (0.72) | 26.2 (1.03) | 13.8 (0.54) | 15.7 (0.62) | 16.6 (0.65) | 16.1 (0.63) | 9.5 (0.37) | 17.3 (0.68) | 17.9 (0.70) | 25.3 (1.00) | 19.8 (0.78) | 231.4 (9.11) |
| Average precipitation days (≥ 0.2 mm) | 3.7 | 2.9 | 3.6 | 2.7 | 4.3 | 6.0 | 4.8 | 4.0 | 4.0 | 4.0 | 4.6 | 3.8 | 48.4 |
Source 1: Bureau of Meteorology (2004-2025)
Source 2: Australian Broadcasting Corporation

== Heritage register ==
The Station and its records form a unique facility for research and education, recognised in May 1996 by its inclusion in the former Register of the National Estate. The statement of significance is as follows:

Fowlers Gap Research Station is a significant arid zone reference area and an important research and education facility. It is the only research station in the arid zone of New South Wales and is the only research station in the winter rainfall arid zone of Australia. The invertebrate fauna of the place is better known and documented than any other range land area in New South Wales, while all other features of the natural environment have been well researched and documented. Areas within the station have been monitored, regularly photographed and data collected for over thirty years, providing an unparalleled record of environmental change and response to monitored environmental conditions in the arid zone of southern Australia. Over 100 scientists have done research and field experiments in the place, with many scientific publications resulting. Research topics are varied and relate to most aspects of the arid zone and its management.

== Gallery ==
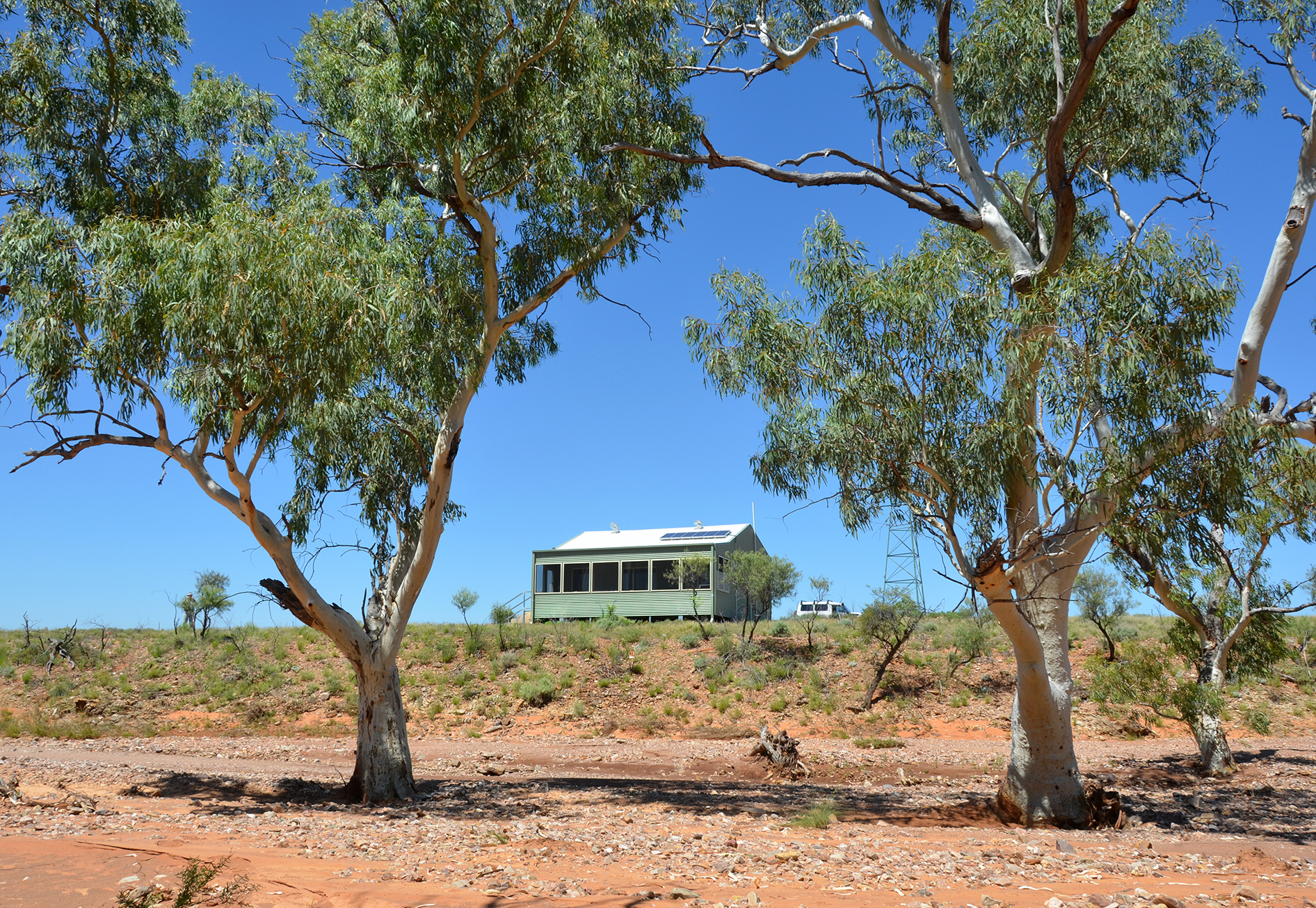
The Green House artists studio

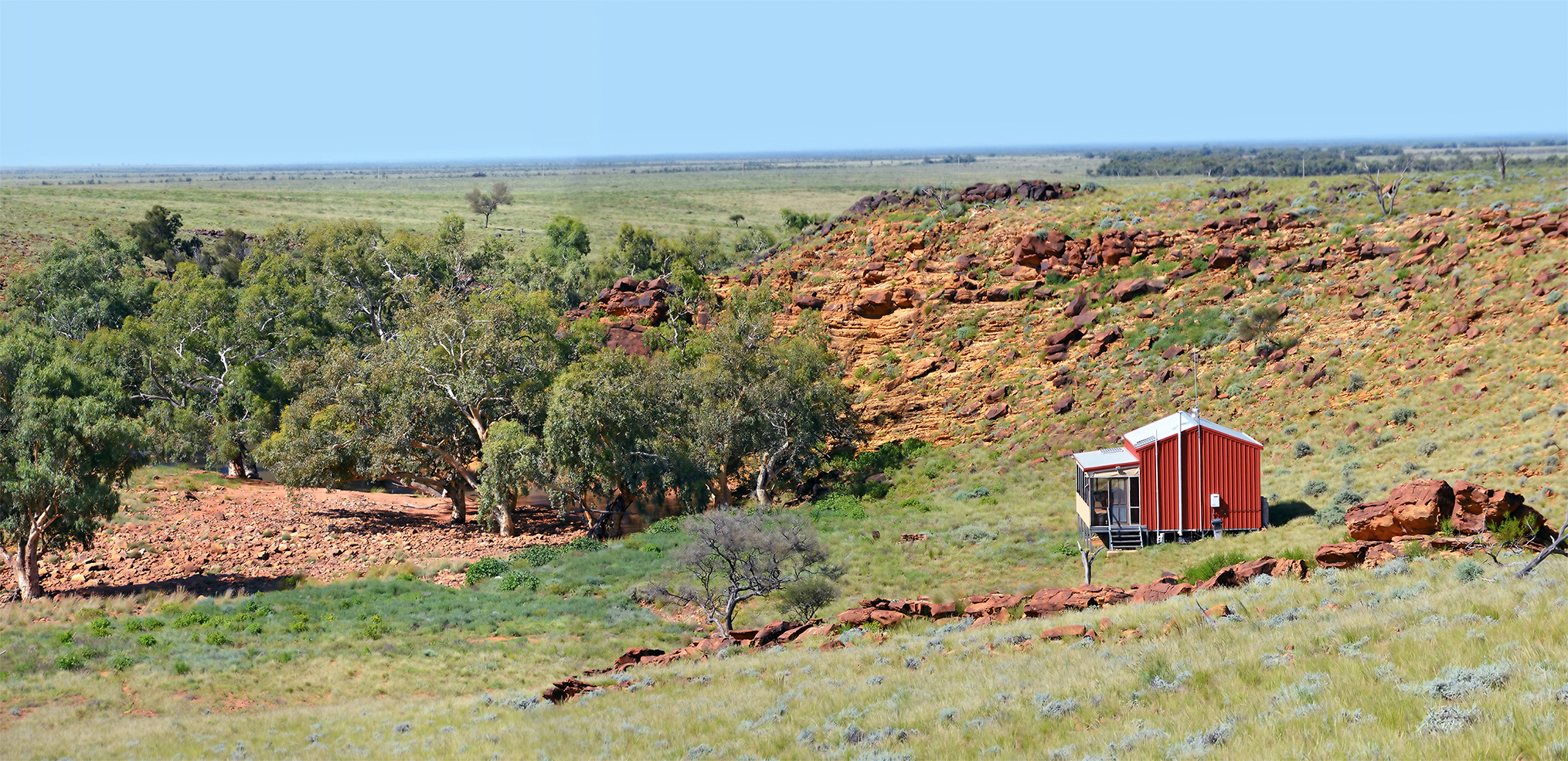
The Ochre House artists studio

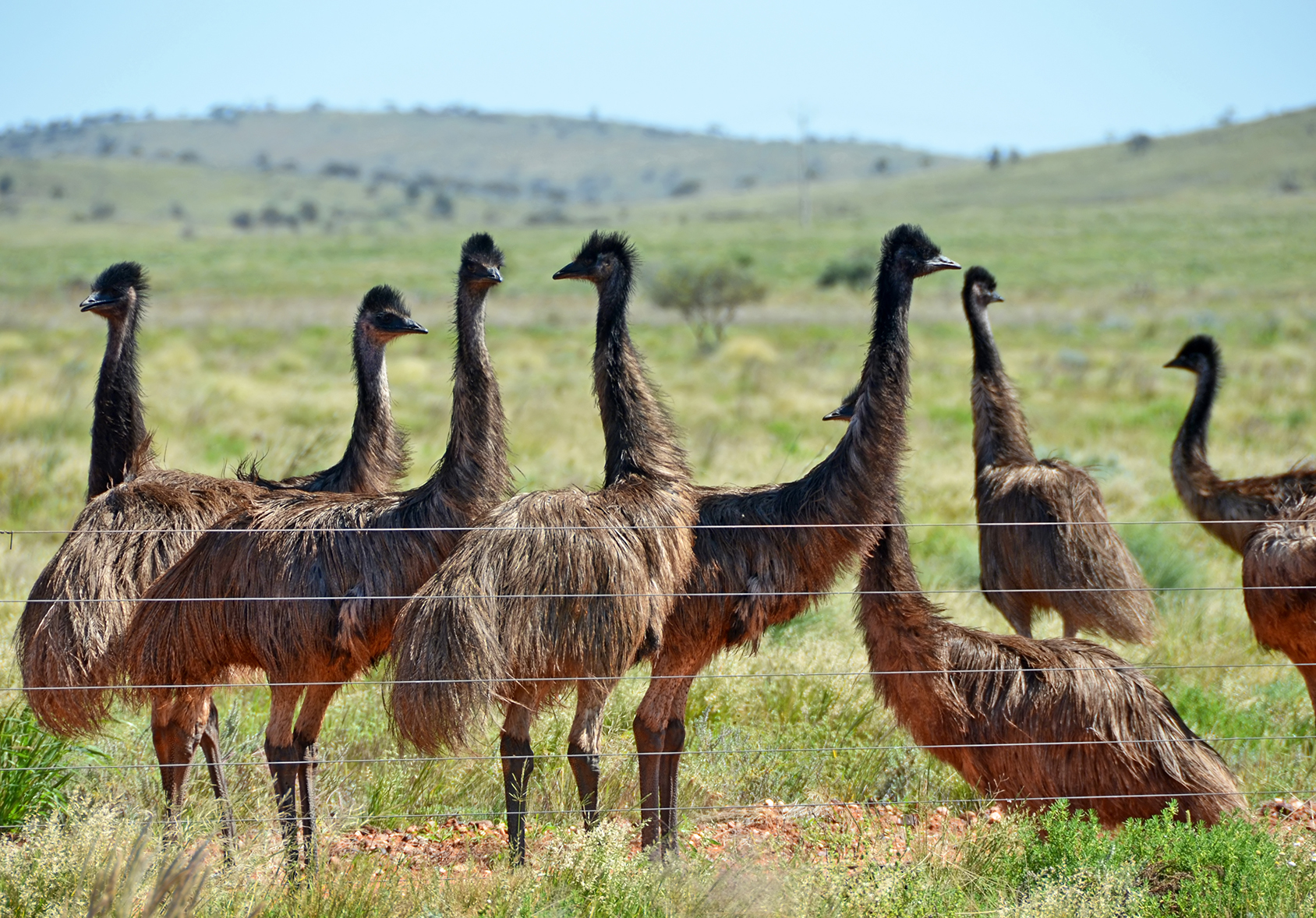
Wild emus by fence at Fowlers Gap Arid Zone Research Station

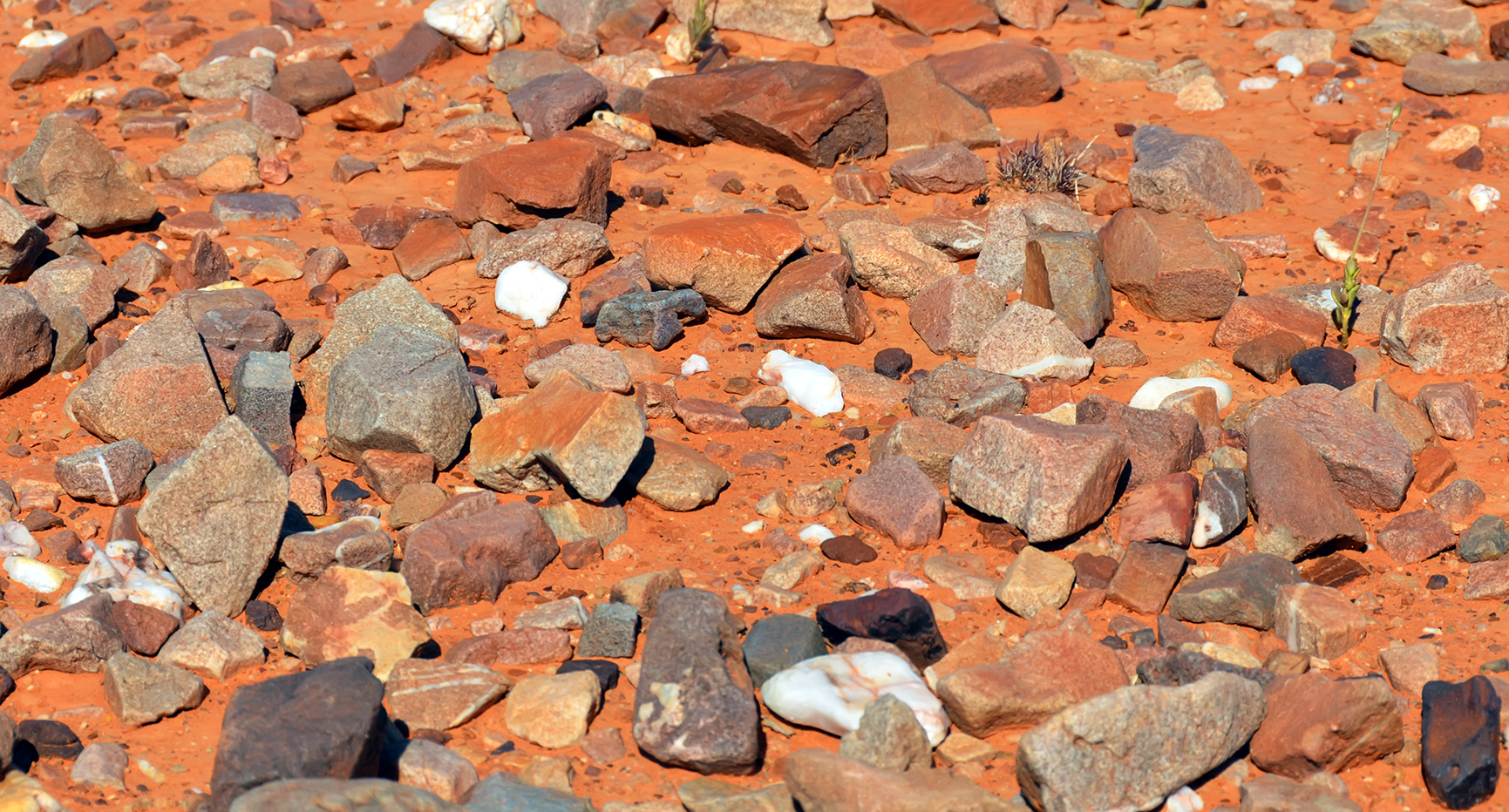
Typical stony desert ground at Fowlers Gap Arid Zone Research Station
