= Mootwingee Station =

Cattle station in New South Wales

Mootwingee Station was a cattle station in far western New South Wales. It is now part of the Mutawintji National Park.
