= Jim Morden =

Australian rules footballer

Personal information
- Full name: Jim Morden
- Born: 20 July 1899
- Died: 6 July 1979 (aged 79)
- Original team: Kooweerup

Playing career^{1}
Years	Club	Games (Goals)
1921–23, 1925	St Kilda	33 (3)
- ^{1} Playing statistics correct to the end of 1925.

Jim Morden (20 July 1899 – 6 July 1979) was an Australian rules footballer who played with St Kilda in the Victorian Football League (VFL).
