= Coopers Creek (New South Wales) =

Coordinates: 28°40′S 153°25′E

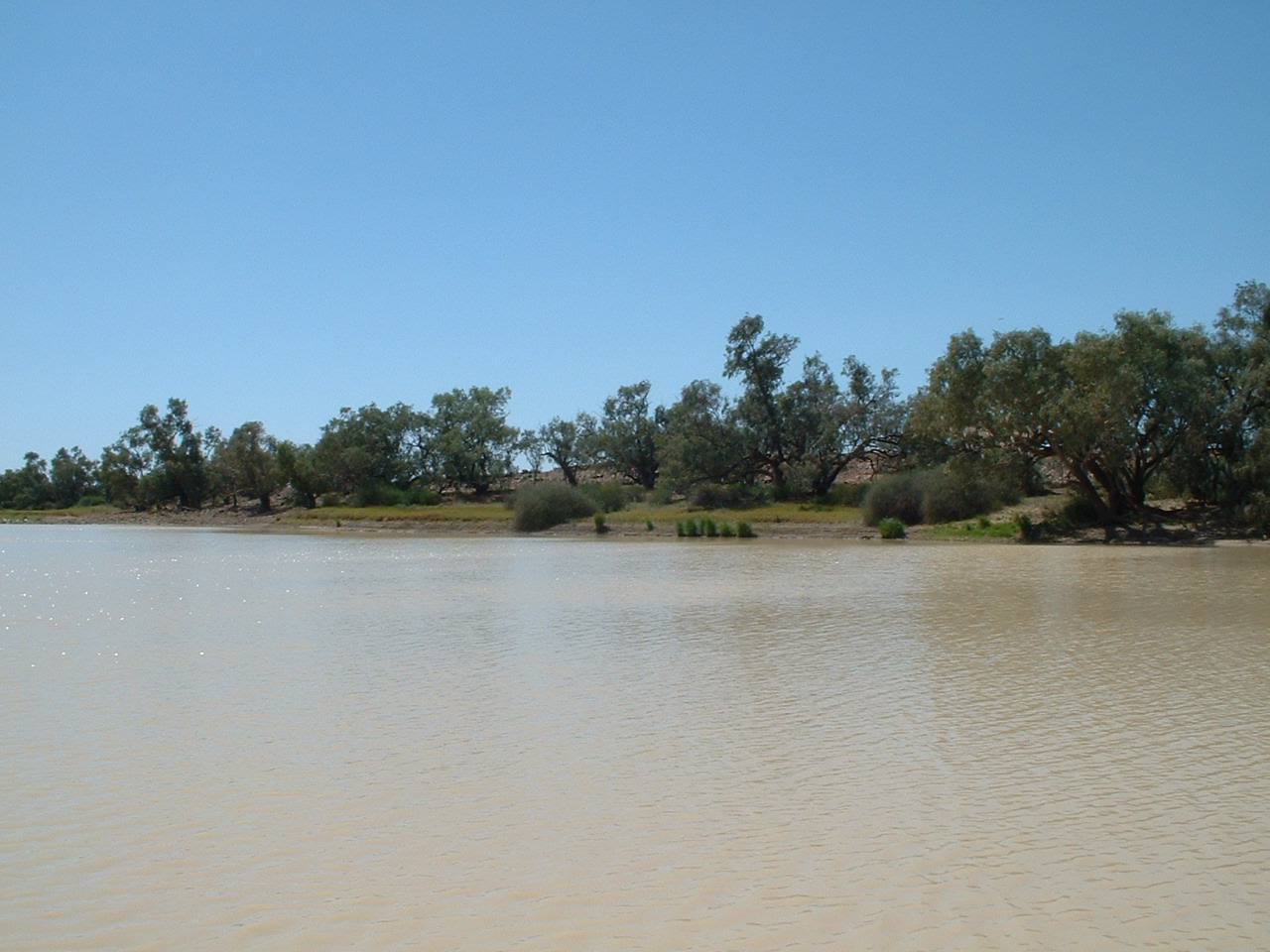
- Etymology: In honour of Alec Cooper, a cedar cutter working in the region in 1880s.

Location
- Country: Australia
- State: New South Wales
- Region: NSW North Coast (IBRA), Northern Rivers
- Local government area: Lismore

Physical characteristics
- Source: Jerusalem Mountain
  - location: Nightcap National Park
  - elevation: 528 m (1,732 ft)
- Mouth: confluence with the Wilsons River
  - location: Bexhill
  - elevation: 8 m (26 ft)
- Length: 66 km (41 mi)

Basin features
- River system: Richmond River catchment
- Tributaries
  - left: Byrangery Creek
  - right: Boomerang Creek
- National park: Nightcap NP

The Coopers Creek, a perennial stream of the Richmond River catchment, is located in Northern Rivers region in the state of New South Wales, Australia.

== Location and features ==
Coopers Creek rises below Jerusalem Mountain about 2.2 kilometres (1.4 mi) east southeast of Doughboy Mountain, in the Nightcap Range within the Nightcap National Park. The river flows generally south southeast and then south southwest, joined by two minor tributaries before reaching its confluence with the Wilsons River near Bexhill. The river descends 521 metres (1,709 ft) over its 66 kilometres (41 mi) course.

== Etymology ==
The river is believed to be named in honour of Alec Cooper, a cedar cutter working in the district surrounding the river during the early 1880s.

== See also ==
- Rivers of New South Wales
- List of rivers of New South Wales (A-K)
- List of rivers of Australia
