= Paakantyi =

Indigenous people in New South Wales, Australia

Paakantyi Lands
- Location within New South Wales
- Location: New South Wales
- Coordinates: 31°08′48″S 142°22′53″E

The Paakantyi, or Barkindji or Barkandji, are Australian Aboriginal people who live along the Darling River, known to them as the Baaka, in Far West New South Wales, Australia.

== Name ==
The ethnonym Paakantyi means "River people", formed from paaka river and the suffix -ntyi, meaning "belonging to", thus "belonging to the river". They refer to themselves as wiimpatya. The name Paakantyi therefore simply means the River People.

== Language ==
Traditionally they speak the Paakantyi language of the Pama–Nyungan family, and one of the three major Aboriginal languages for the people of the current Broken Hill region.

The major work on the Paakantyi language has been that of the late linguist Luise Hercus.

== Country ==
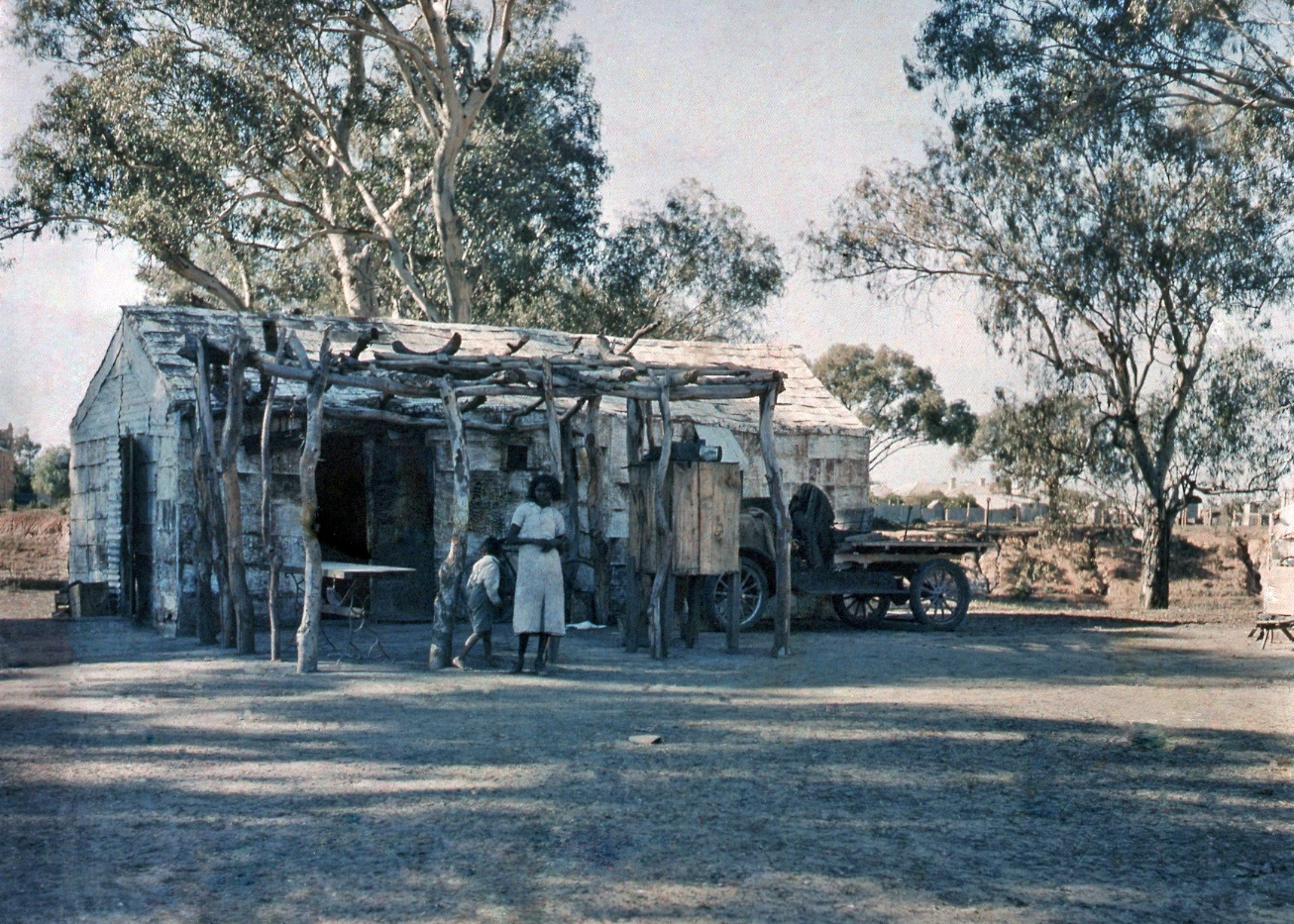
Paakantyi indigenous house in 1935

The Paakantyi dwelt along the Darling River, from Wilcannia downstream almost to the Avoca Homestead Complex near Wentworth. Inland on either side of the Darling, their territory extended to a distance of roughly 20 to 30 miles (32–48 km). According to Norman Tindale, they inhabited an area of some 7,500 square miles (19,000 km^{2}). They lived also in the back country from the river, around the Paroo River and Broken Hill. They were close neighbours of the Maraura, further down the Great Darling Anabranch.

The landscape is characterized by brick-red sandhills and grey clay flats.

The Barkindji today derive from several dialects, all speaking variations of the same language or Barlku. Historically these dialects were distinct groups, but with colonisation these groups are more singularly recognised as Barkindji today, with the language (Paakantyi palku) and intermarriage linking these smaller dialect groups together in far western NSW:

- Baarundji (Barrindji)
- Wilyakali (Wilyali)
- Pulakali (Pulaali)
- Pantjikali (Pantjaali)
- Wanyuparlku (Wanyuwalku)
- Barkindji
- Thankakali (Dhangaali)
- Marawara (Maraura)

The land was harsh: drought was not rare. When parched conditions set in, the Paakantyi would withdraw into the backcountry around the few perennial springs, and hunt the wildlife that came to drink water there.

== Mythology ==
In Paakantyi lore, the landscape of and around the river was created by Ngatji, the dreamtime rainbow serpent (Note: The Paakantyi consider that reproductive considerations mean that there were 2 kinds of Ngatji, one male and the other female. (Gibson 2016, p. 207)) This figure is still believed to travel underground from waterhole to waterhole, and should not be disturbed. His presence is seen in such phenomena as when whirly breezes stir up the Darling's waterways.

== History of contact ==
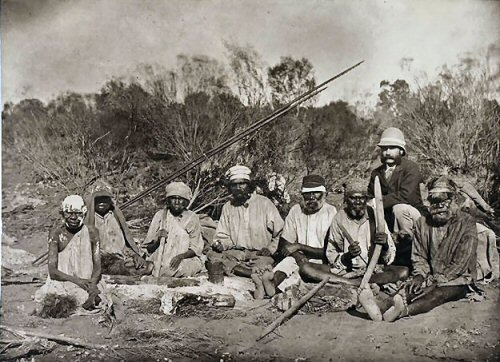
A photograph by Frederic Bonney. Bonney is in the pith helmet, Old Peter is on the right, Wonko Mary is on the far left wearing a mourning cap. Another man holds a boomerang and a short throwing stick known as a kutjurru. Behind them are two barbed spears and in the fire is a billy can and a recycled tin.

The first European who travelled through their territory, Thomas Mitchell, appears to be referring to the Barkindji when he mentions the Occa tribe in the area of Wilcannia. (Note: Occa according to Tindale is a mishearing of the word for the section of the Darling River where he came across them, namely Ba:ka. (Tindale 1974))

One estimate of the population for the period immediately before contact with whites, taking into account the hard climatic conditions, suggested that the 2,000 square miles (5,200 km^{2}) could have sustained no more than 100 people. On the other hand, Simpson Newland, a contemporary familiar with the district where they lived, wrote in illustration of the point that: "we cannot but admit that our happy prosperous lot in these bright colonies is purchased at the cost of the welfare, nay, even the lives of the possessors of the soil", and illustrated the point in the following words:

A few years ago the aboriginals of the Upper Darling were comparatively numerous; now they, in common with other tribes wherever the European has settled, have nearly passed away. This has been brought about by no epidemic, nor the use of intoxicants, or cold, or hunger; none of these have had much to do with it. I can vouch for their being well fed and clothed, and for years spirits were almost entirely kept from them; yet they died off, the old and young, the strong and weakly alike, sometimes with startling suddenness, at others by a wasting sickness of a few days, weeks, or months.

The people the explorer Mitchell encountered and called Occa, are, according to Norman Tindale, probably to be identified with the Paakantyi. Tindale argues that Mitchell misheard the name for their section of the river, Ba:ka.

Sometime around 1850, according to elders' memories, an epidemic attacked the Paakantyi and the neighbouring Naualko, affecting their numbers drastically tribes, killing off an estimated third of each tribe. Panic overtook the two peoples, they took flight, leaving those struck by the illness unburied in the sandhills - the mortality was particularly high around Peri Lake - as they sought refuge at the Paroo river, where the disease was unknown.

Frederic Bonney was one of the earliest settlers in their area, and ran stock there for 15 years.

In the nineteenth century, they were much reduced by disease and they ended up working for the immigrants who had invaded their lands. Pictures were taken by Bonney at Momba Station over 15 years from the mid-1860s down to 1880 which have provided a sympathetic and accurate picture of these people. Bonney wrote sympathetically of the Paakantyi, stating that they were "naturally honest, truthful, and kind-hearted. Their manner is remarkably courteous and to little children, they are very kind. Affectionate and faithful to chosen companions, also showing exceeding respect to aged persons and willingly attending to their wants."

With the disintegration of traditional tribal ways, the Paakantyi have been afflicted by alcoholism, high unemployment, and have a high incidence of inter-group and domestic violence. The Paakantyi were considered to be a "vanishing tribe" by the mid-twentieth century. In recent times their descendants are concentrated in Wilcannia. At a conservative estimate of Wilcannia's approximately 600 residents, 68% are of Paakantyi descent. The town enjoyed a colonial boom, being the third largest inland port in those times, and was occasionally referred to, humorously and ironically, as "Queen City of the West", alluding to the nickname of the powerful river port in the US, Cincinnati. Overgrazing by cattle and sheep, the arrival of rabbits in the early 1890s and the Federation drought led to soil degradation and extensive loss of vegetation. Non-native species of fish introduced into the river system also damaged its ecology. In later periods the extraction of water for cotton farming higher up on the northern reaches of the Darling has drastically reduced water flow through this area for tribes once known as the "people of the river".

== Native title ==
In 1997, the Barkindji people filed a lawsuit claiming the national native title tribunal. To support their claim they collected documents from traditional owners and reports written by anthropologists, historians and linguists.

Their native title was officially recognised by the Australian government, in a ruling handed down by federal judge Jayne Jagot, after 18 years of legal battle, in 2015. The area covers 128,000 square kilometres (49,000 mi^{2}) from the South Australian border, eastwards to Tilpa, south to Wentworth and northwards to Wanaaring.

== Alternative names ==
- Bakanji, Bakandi, Bakanji, Bakandi, Bargunji, Bagundji, Bagandji
- Bandjangali
- Bargunji, Bagundji, Bagandji
- Barkinji, Barkinjee, Barkunjee, Bahkunji
- Bpaa'gkon-jee
- Kaiela (A Kureinji term for them, meaning "northerners")
- Kkengee
- Kornoo (A name for the language of several Darling River tribes)
- Kurnu
- Pakindji, Pa:kindzi, Bakandji, Bahkunjy, Barkinghi
- Parkungi, Parkengee, Parkingee, Parkingee
- Wimbaja ("man")

Source: Tindale 1974

== Some words ==
- kuuya (generic term for fish)
- mingga (waterhole)
- parntu (cod)

Source: Gibson 2016, p. 211

== Notable people ==
- Elsie Rose Jones, elder and respected teacher (1917–1996)
- Annie Moysey, matriarch, known in later life as "Grannie Moysey" (1875-1976)
- Panga, artist, 1870s
- Dick Barkinji (explorer)
- Derek Eggmolesse-Smith, Australian rules footballer
- Barkaa, musician
- Topar, explorer who guided Charles Sturt in 1844
- Joseph Zada, actor who plays Haymitch Abernathy in The Hunger Games Sunrise on the Reaping movie

== Some books ==
- Kilampa wura Kaani: The galah and the frill neck lizard, told by Elsie Jones, illustrated by Cecil Whyman. Wilcannia, N.S.W.: Disadvantaged Country Area Programme, 1978
- Paakantji Alphabet Book, by Elsie Jones, illustrated by Mark Quale and Tim Whyman. Dubbo: Disadvantaged Country Area Programme, Western Readers Committee, 1981.
- The Story of the Falling Star, told by Elsie Jones, with drawings by Doug Jones and collages by Karin Donaldson. Canberra: Aboriginal Studies Press, for the Australian Institute of Aboriginal Studies, 1989.

== Sources ==
- Andersen, Elena Handlos (2015). Development of a Learner's Grammar for Paakantyi (PDF) (M.A. thesis). School of Linguistics, Faculty of Arts and Social Sciences, University of Sydney.
- Bonney, Frederic (1884). "On Some Customs of the Aborigines of the River Darling, New South Wales". The Journal of the Anthropological Institute of Great Britain and Ireland. 13: 122–137. doi:10.2307/2841717. JSTOR 2841717.
- Cameron, A. L. P. (1885). "Notes on Some Tribes of New South Wales". The Journal of the Anthropological Institute of Great Britain and Ireland. 14: 344–370. doi:10.2307/2841627. JSTOR 2841627.
- Forsyth, Hannah (3 May 2016). "The Barkindji people are losing their "mother", the drying Darling River". theconversation.com/the-barkindji-people-are-losing-their-mother-the-drying-darling-river-57884.
- Gibson, Lorraine (2016) [First published 2012]. ""We Are the River": Place, Wellbeing and Aboriginal Identity". In Fuller, Sara; Atkinson, Sarah; Painter, Joe (eds.). Wellbeing and Place. Routledge. pp. 201–216. ISBN 978-1-134-75889-0.
- Hardy, Bobbie (1976). Lament for the Barkindji: The Vanishing Tribes of the Darling Region. Rigby. ISBN 978-0727-00008-8.
- Hardy, Bobbie (2000). "Annie Moysey (1875–1976)". Australian Dictionary of Biography, vol. 15. Melbourne University Press.
- Hercus, Luise A. (1989). "Three Linguistic Studies from far Southwestern NSW". Aboriginal History. 13 (1). Canberra: 45–62.
- Hercus, Luise A. (2011) [First published 1993]. Paakantyi Dictionary. Canberra: AIATSIS. ISBN 978-0-646-15261-5 – via academia.edu.
- Hercus, Luise A.; Austin, Peter (2004). "The Yarli languages". In Bowern, Claire; Koch, Harold (eds.). Australian Languages: Classification and the comparative method. John Benjamins Publishing. pp. 207–222. ISBN 978-9-027-29511-8.
- Hope, Jeanette; Lindsay, Robert (2010). The People of the Paroo River: Frederick Bonney's Photographs (PDF). Department of Environment, Climate Change and Water, NSW. pp. 207–222. ISBN 978-1-742-32328-2.
- Lindsay, Robert. "Obituary: Elsie Rose Jones". Obituaries Australia. Australian National University. National Centre of Biography.
- Lydon, Jane; Braithwaite, Sari; Bostock-Smith, Shauna (2014). "Photographing Indigenous people in New South Wales". In Lydon, Jane (ed.). Calling the shots: Indigenous photographies. Aboriginal Studies Press. pp. 55–75. ISBN 978-1-922-05959-8.
- Mathews, R. H. (1898). "Group divisions and initiation ceremonies of the Barkungee tribes". Journal and Proceedings of the Royal Society of New South Wales. 32: 241–255.
- Newland, Simpson (1887–1888). "Parkengees, or aboriginal tribes on the Darling River" (PDF). Proceedings of the Royal Geographical Society of Australasia, South Australian Branch. 2: 20–32.
- "Panga: a Paakantye draughtsman on the Paroo in the 1870s". Aboriginal artists of the Nineteenth Century: a celebration. National Museum of Australia.
- Tan, Monica (16 June 2015a). "Largest native title claim in NSW history finalised after 18-year legal struggle". The Guardian.
- Tan, Monica (23 June 2015b). ""We've got to tell them all our secrets" – how the Barkandji won a landmark battle for Indigenous Australians". The Guardian.
- Tindale, Norman Barnett (1974). Aboriginal Tribes of Australia: Their Terrain, Environmental Controls, Distribution, Limits, and Proper Names. Australian National University Press. ISBN 978-0-708-10741-6.
- Volkofsky, Aimee (12 May 2020). "Indigenous community sets up camp on Darling River to avoid coronavirus risk in overcrowded homes". ABC News.
- "Wilcannia Agency". The Worker. No. 43. 22 October 1898. p. 8 – via Trove.
