= Paakantyi language =

Aboriginal language in New South Wales, Australia

Paakantyi
- Darling
- Native to: Australia
- Ethnicity: Paakantyi, Kula (Kurnu), Naualko, Paaruntyi, Parrintyi, Wilyakali (Wiljali), Danggali, Maraura, Wanjiwalku
- Native speakers: 110 (2021 census)
- Language family: Pama–Nyungan: Yarli–Baagandji; Paakantyi
- Dialects: ?Gurnu (Guula); Naualko; Baarundji; Barrindji; Wiljaali; Dhanggaali (Thangkaali); Bulaali; Wanyuparlku (Wanyuparlku); Pantyikali; Marawara (Maraura)

Language codes
- ISO 639-3: drl
- Glottolog: darl1243
- AIATSIS: D12
- ELP: Paakantyi
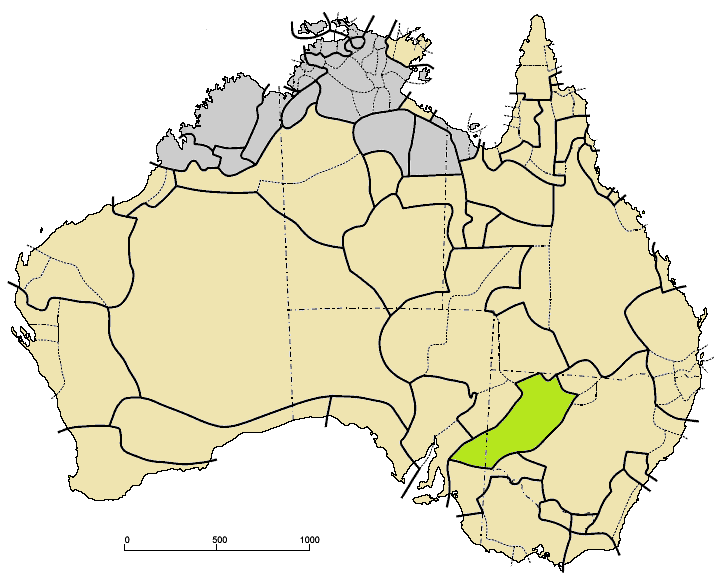
- The Darling language (green) among other Pama–Nyungan (tan)

- Paakantyi is classified as Critically Endangered by the UNESCO Atlas of the World's Languages in Danger.

The Paakantyi language, also spelt Paakantji, Barkindji, Barkandji, and Baagandji, and is also known as the Darling language, is a nearly extinct Australian Aboriginal language spoken along the Darling River in New South Wales from the present-day Queensland border to Bourke, then along the river to Wentworth. It includes much of the backcountry around the Paroo River, plus an area along Coopers Creek into Queensland and also through the Broken Hill district.

The name of the people and the language refers to the Paaka (Darling River, known today as the Darling-Barka). The suffix -ntyi means "belonging to". Speakers of the language are known as the Paakantyi (or variant spellings). The variant is slightly different along the river proper and ceases at the confluence of the Darling-Barka and the Murray rivers.

The major work on the Paakantyi language has been by linguist Luise Hercus.

== Dialects ==
Dialects of Paakantyi include Southern Paakantyi (Baagandji, Bagundji), Kurnu (Kula), Wilyakali (Wiljagali), and Pantyikali-Wanyiwalku (Wanyuparlku, Bandjigali, Baarundji), Parrintyi (Barrindji) and Marawara (Maraura). Bowern (2011) lists Gurnu/Guula as a separate language, though Hercus includes it because of its almost identical vocabulary. Dixon adds several other names, some perhaps synonyms; Bulaali (Bulali) may have been an alternative name for Wilyakali, but also for a different language, Maljangapa.

However, Tindale (1940) mapped the 'Rite of Circumcision' border around Wanyiwalku, separating it from the rest of Paakantyi. Tindale instead grouped Wanyiwalku with Maljangapa, Wadikali and Karenggapa of the Yarli language.

== Current status ==
A 2012 report indicated that two people could speak the Darling language fluently, while in the 2021 census, 111 individuals said they spoke Paakantyi at home.

== Phonology ==
=== Consonants ===
| | Labial | Dental | Palatal | Alveolar | Retroflex | Velar |
|---|---|---|---|---|---|---|
| Plosive | p | t̪ | c | t | ʈ | k |
| Nasal | m | n̪ | ɲ | n | ɳ | ŋ |
| Lateral | | l̪ | ʎ | l | ɭ | |
| Rhotic | | | | ɾ~r | | |
| Approximant | w | | j | | ɻ | |

Voiceless stops can also be heard as voiced [b, d̪, d, ɟ, ɖ, ɡ].

=== Vowels ===
| | Front | Central | Back |
|---|---|---|---|
| Close | ɪ, i | | ʊ, u |
| Open | | ə, a | |
