= PS Ruby (1907) =

Paddle steam boat

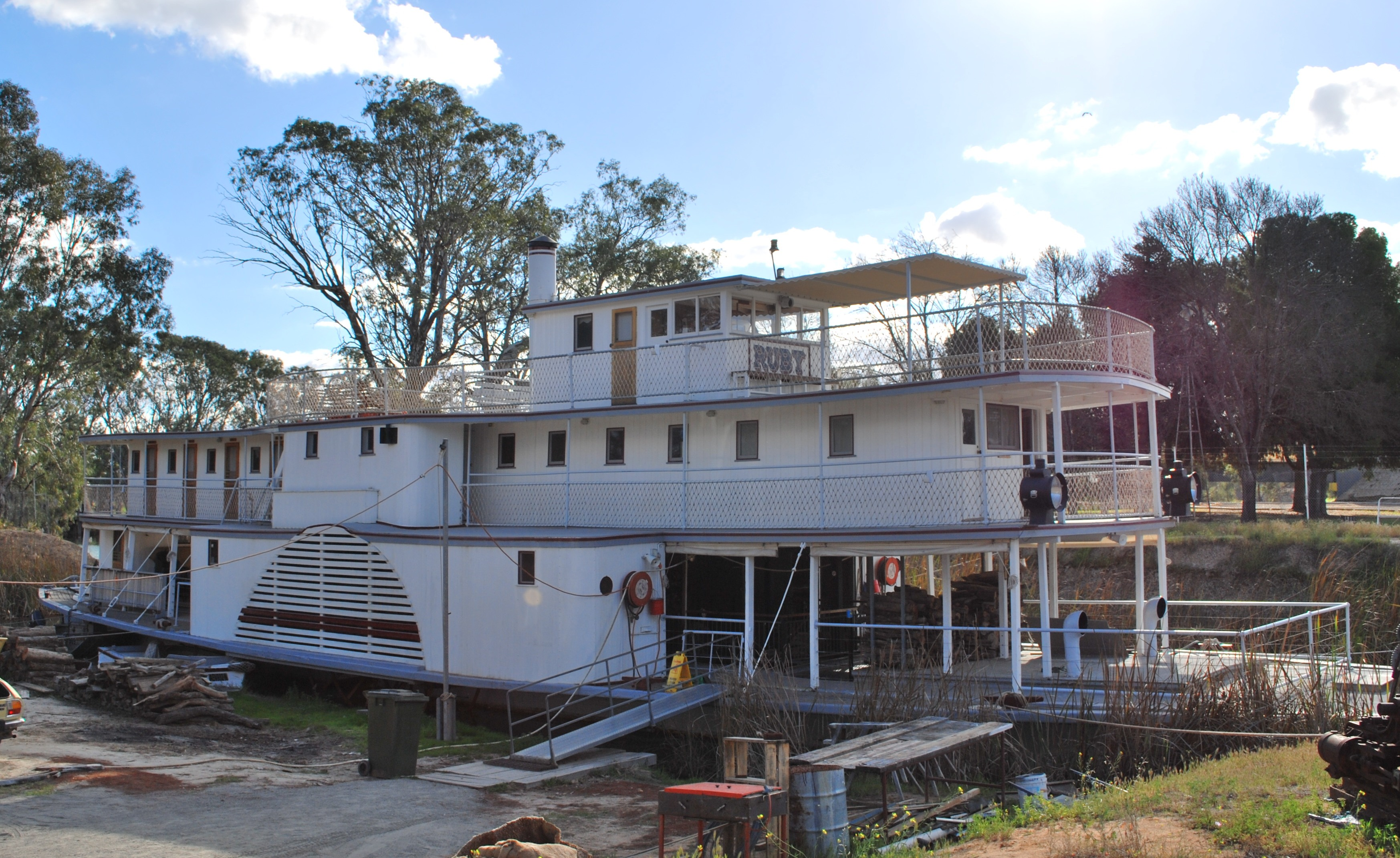
- PS Ruby

History

Australia
- Name: Ruby
- Owner: Capt. H King
- Route: Murray River, Australia
- Builder: David Low Milne
- Launched: 1907
- Maiden voyage: 1 March 1908
- Out of service: 1928
- Reinstated: 11 July 2004
- Home port: Morgan, South Australia, Australia
- Status: Tourist attraction

General characteristics
- Class & type: Paddle steamer
- Length: 130 ft 9 in (39.85 m)
- Beam: 18 ft 9 in (5.72 m)
- Draught: 2 ft 6 in (0.76 m)
- Propulsion: Side wheel
- Notes: References:

The PS Ruby, also known as the Paddle Steamer Ruby, is the flagship of the historic port of Wentworth, New South Wales at the junction of the Murray and Darling Rivers. She is a composite hull paddle steamer that features a 1926 Robey & Co 20 nominal horsepower portable steam engine. Between 1996 and 2007 she was restored to her early 20th-century appearance.

== History ==
=== Construction & life on the river ===
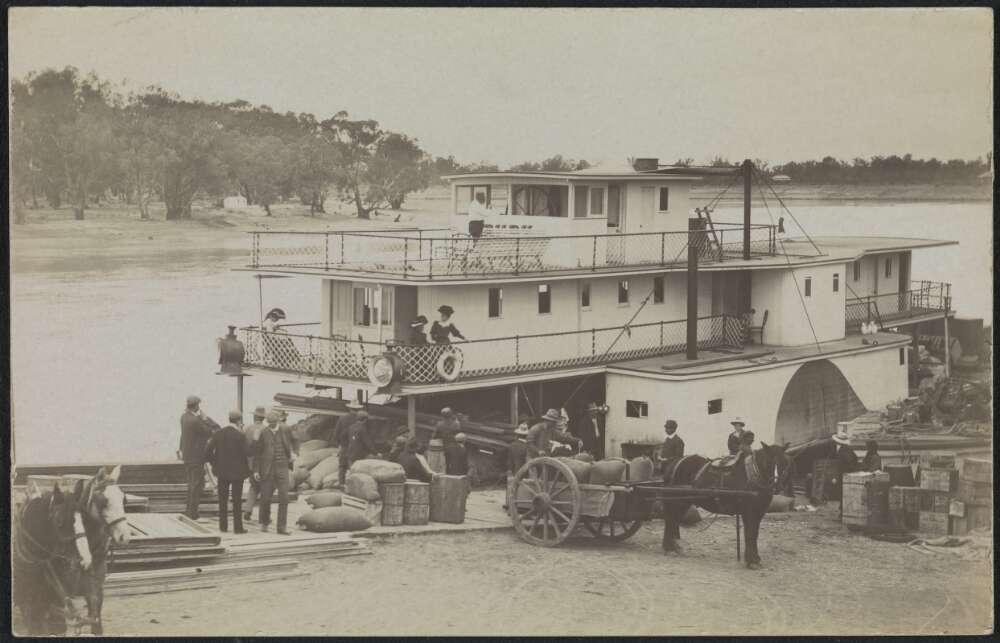
PS Ruby loading cargo at Renmark, South Australia (c. 1910)

The PS Ruby was built in 1907 at Morgan, South Australia by David Low Milne at the request of Captain Hugh King. This Ruby was a replacement for the Paddle Steamer Ruby built in 1876, which had been modified several times and had sunk twice before having her engine removed in 1908 (subsequently being renamed the Barge Radia).

The Ruby left on her maiden voyage from Morgan, South Australia on 1 March 1908, arriving at Renmark on the morning of Saturday, 8 March 1908. She arrived towing barges Emerald and Pearl, carrying a total of over 80 tons of cargo. Australia's Governor-General Lord Northcote travelled on board the Ruby in July 1908, arriving at Renmark before continuing to Wentworth and arriving on 16 July.

The Gem Navigation Company was formed toward the end of 1909, and though she operated alongside vessels of this company, the PS Ruby was not formally placed under ownership of this group until 1914. During this year, the PS Ruby, PS Gem, PS Ellen, and PS Marion operated alongside each other between Morgan and Mildura. The Gem Navigation Company amalgamated with four other riverboat companies in 1919 to create Murray Shipping Limited.

The PS Ruby ran aground in 1921 when, upstream of Swan Hill during a high river, a deckhand under the direction of Capt. G Alexander mistook saplings upon a nearby levee bank as the bank of the river, leading the Ruby over the levee onto the ground, causing the vessel to stop. The Ruby remained stationary for 12 days, costing the Murray Shipping Company almost £2000, and requiring the assistance of six other riverboats to return her to the river.

=== Decline in river trade ===
The Ruby continued to operate between Morgan and Mildura until the late 1920s, including occasional trips to Euston and Echuca. Her last regular passenger cruise between Morgan and Mildura is recorded as being in 1928. The Ruby made occasional charter cruises in the early 1930s, before being sold and moved permanently to Mildura. The Ruby was removed from service in the early 1930s, and was laid up at her home port of Morgan for several years before being purchased in 1938 by Maurice Collins, of the Collins Brothers, for £200. This preceded her move to Mildura. The Collins Brother removed the engines, boiler and paddlewheels from the vessel, before she was sold again. The Ruby was sold multiple times prior to 1944, by which time Vic Robbins operated her as a houseboat. The PS Avoca later towed her to Johnsons Bend, and by the 1960s the Ruby had fallen into serious disrepair.

=== Restoration ===
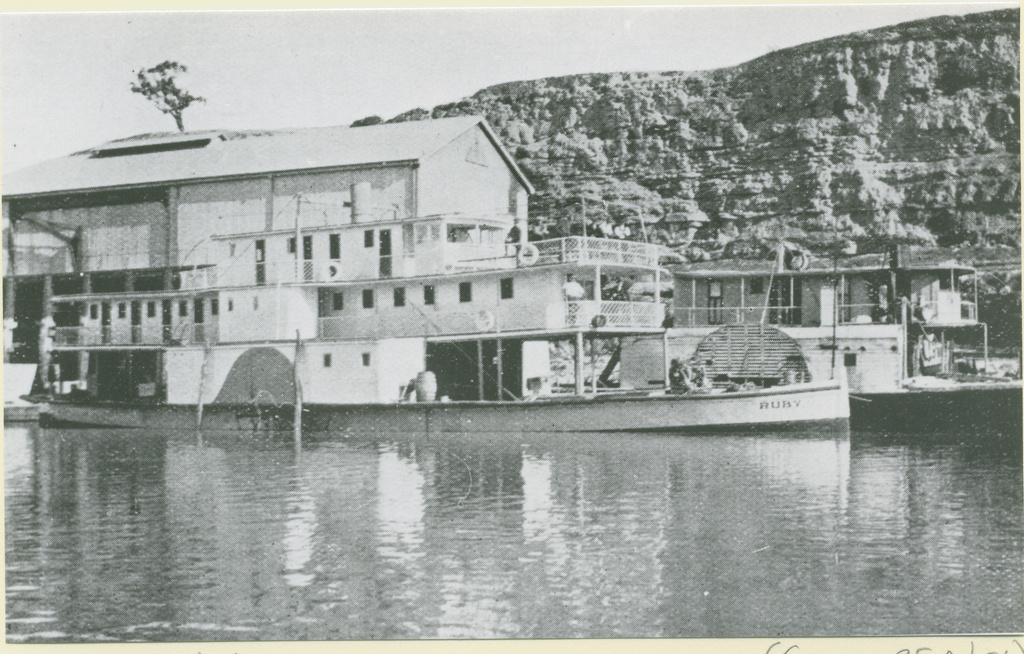
PS Ruby tied up along another paddle steamer at Morgan Wharf (c 1920) SLSA: [PRG 1258/1/3331]

The Wentworth Rotary Club, under the guidance of Frank Fotherby, purchased the PS Ruby for $1,600 in 1968. Due to years of neglect, her hull had begun to leak, leaving her resting on the mud of the river bank. The top deck of the boat was missing; many planks of the superstructure, the funnel, and the paddlewheels were also missing. With the power of a speedboat using a 100hp Mercury outboard engine, the Ruby was towed to the Wentworth wharf under the guidance of Capt. P Hogg. While the Ruby did sink at the Wentworth wharf, she was soon refloated and towed across the river to a basin that was soon drained, leaving the boat high and dry. Initially, the Wentworth Rotary Club relied on the local community and private donations to assist the restoration of the PS Ruby. Between 1968 and 1973, the WRC spent $5447 (with most of this figure spent on materials). The vessel's figure was soon restored, with her engine room being filled with sand for children's enjoyment. The park of her residence soon became known as 'Fotherby Park'.

Following an offer from Echuca to purchase the PS Ruby, the Wentworth Rotary Club donated the boat to the Wentworth community in 1996. After 30 years out of water, a full restoration was required (this included procedures such as excavating surrounding land and placing the hull on steel girders). 360 planks of the hull had to be replaced, and on 16 February 2001 the task of caulking the hull began to take place (an estimated 13 kg of oakum was hammered into the plank seams to watertight the hull). The deckhouse was then restored, requiring almost the entire superstructure to be refitted or replaced. On 26 January 2002, the PS Ruby was refloated. In September 2003, the Ruby was towed to Wentworth wharf to celebrate the 150th anniversary of the first paddle steamers navigating the Murray River. By 2004, the paddlewheels were refitted, and cabins complete. The boiler was also installed, and during 2005 a substantial amount of work was undertaken in renovating and rebuilding the 1926 Robey & Co 20 nominal horsepower portable steam engine. The PS Ruby steamed for the first time in 70 years in May 2007.

== Cabins of the PS Ruby ==
Adapted from Paddle Steamer Ruby: One Hundred Years On
Cabin number	Name	Details
1	Whyte Cabin	Named for E V Whyte (1900–1972), a fruit-growing property owner in Pomona and charter member of the Wentworth Rotary Club. An enthusiastic volunteer that worked on repairing the PS Ruby when bought to Wentworth in 1968.
2	Les Hunt Cabin	Named for L Hunt (1925–2000), lifelong member of the Mildura and District Historical Society with strong ties to the Murray River.
3	Moolgewanke Cabin	The PS Moolgewanke was a steamer launched in 1856 by J Crozier and H Jamieson, named after the Ngarrindjeri water spirits (half human, half fish).She carried stores to stations, and took wool and salt mined on Moorna Station. The Moolgewanke was burnt and abandoned at Wentworth in 1904.
4	Gunn Cabin	W Gunn became the first mayor of Wentworth in 1879. An important businessman, builder of the Crown hotel, and founder of Rendlesham House.
5	Laza-Way Cabin	Colin Rankin designed and constructed a fleet of houseboats known as Laza-Way in 1966.
6	Kiely Cabin	P and A Kiely were long-time operators of the Wentworth Gaol Museum, the latter also being a long-serving Wentworth Shire councillor.
7	Curlwaa Community Cabin	Curlwaa became the first government irrigation area established in NSW, when the Wentworth Irrigation Trust was allowed some 10,600 acres of land in 1890.
8	Armorer Forster Cabin	A W Forster arrived in the Sunraysia district in 1847, and was an early settler of Mildura.
9	Hunter Cabin	Sponsored by N and B Hunter - inspired by Leon Wagner. They salute the Ruby and all who are dedicated to her long life - past present and future.
10	McKinnon Cabin	Named for the McKinnon family - D McKinnon was a Wentworth Shire councillor for 16 years, and mayor for 11 years.
11	Fuller Cabin	B M Fuller owned a number of paddlesteamers operating between Goolwa and Wilcannia in the 1870s and 1880s.
12	Merbein Sawmills Cabin	Merbein Sawmills have operated in the Wentworth area for generations - the Rowe family donated over 350 redgums planks used while restoring the Ruby's hull.
14	Wagner Cabin	Sponsored by Adrian and Camille Wagner.
15	Apex Cabin	The Wentworth Apex (c 1960) has raised more than $500,000 (as of 2007) for community project, including the restoration of the PS Ruby.

* There is no Cabin 13

== Steam engine ==
The machinery of the PS Ruby consisted of a 70 psi boiler attached to a 20 nominal horsepower 2-cylinder Robey & Co high pressure horizontal steam engine (built in Lincoln, England). This engine was replaced in 1911 by a new power plant consisting of a narrow gauge locomotive boiler attached to an 1878 15 horsepower McCall, Anderson & Co direct action steam engine, taken from the recently decommissioned PS Industry.

The engine of the Ruby was again replaced in 1918, this time a locomotive type 100psi Martin & Co steam engine requisitioned from the PS Lancashire Lass. This engine was removed in June 1922, and replaced with a 1916 Horwoods 2-cylinder non-condensing steam engine built in Adelaide. Her 1916 engine was removed from the vessel following her sale to M Collins (of the Collins brothers) and her relocation to Mildura in 1938.

The Ruby was refitted with a 1926 Robey & Co 20 nominal horsepower portable steam engine and boiler in 2004, following a donation for the Wentworth Shire Council and grants from the NSW Heritage Office. This engine is the same make and size of the original steam engine fitted to the vessel in 1907. The PS Ruby steamed for the first time in over 70 years on 16 May 2007.
