= Leioproctus anthedonus =

Scientific classification
- Kingdom: Animalia
- Phylum: Arthropoda
- Clade: Pancrustacea
- Class: Insecta
- Order: Hymenoptera
- Family: Colletidae
- Genus: Leioproctus
- Species: L. anthedonus

Binomial name
- Leioproctus anthedonus Maynard 2013

Species of bee

Leioproctus anthedonus, or Leioproctus (Goniocolletes) anthedonus, is a species of bee in the family Colletidae and subfamily Colletinae. It is endemic to Australia. It was described by Australian entomologist Glynn Maynard in 2013.

== Etymology ==
The specific epithet anthedonus is Greek for "bee".

== Description ==
Female body length is about 10 mm. Integumental colouration is mainly black, with orange on the metasoma. The hair is mostly white.

== Distribution and habitat ==
The species occurs in south-western New South Wales. The type locality is 10 km west of Wentworth.

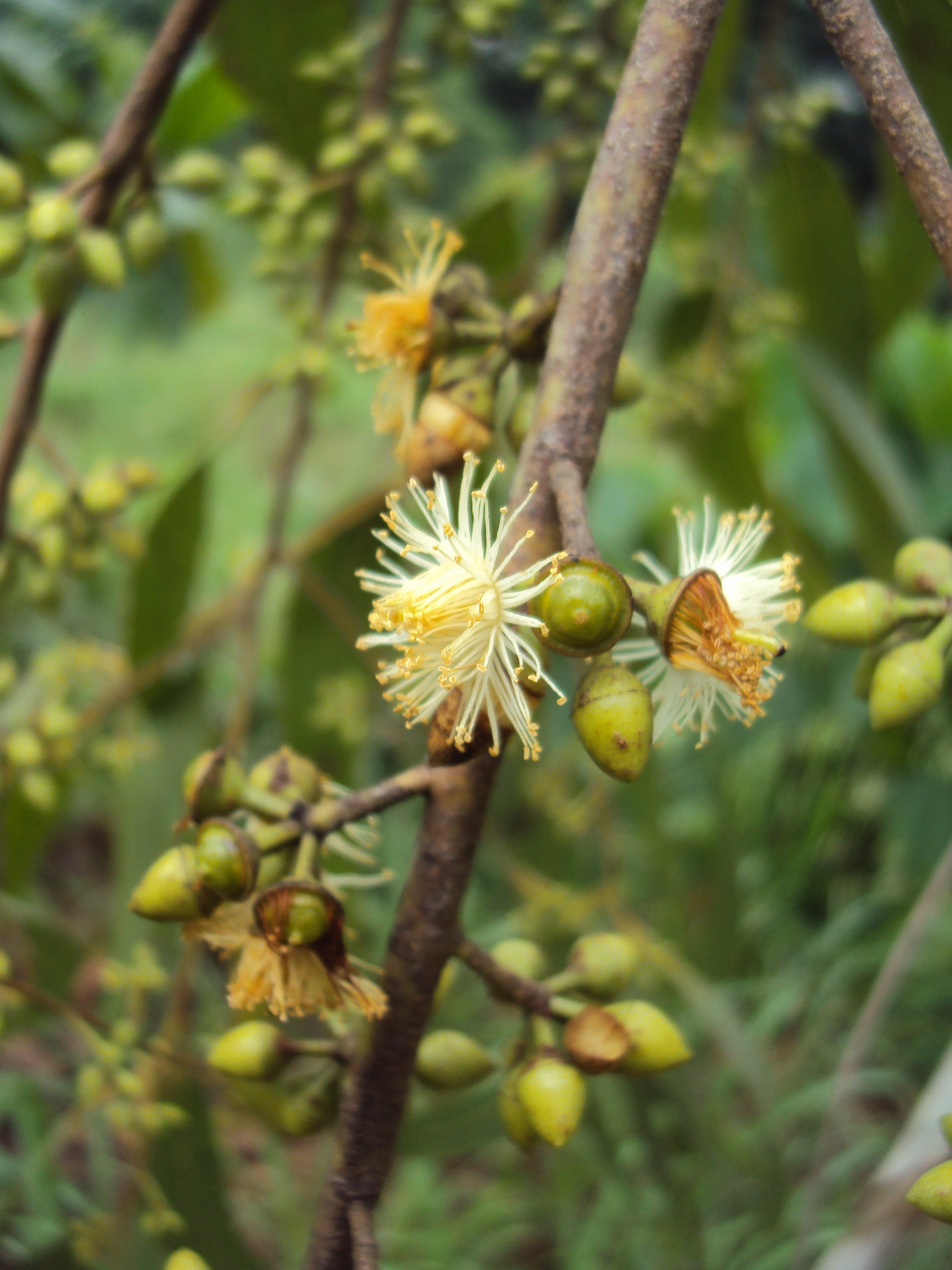
Flowers of Eucalyptus camaldulensis

== Behaviour ==
The adults are flying mellivores. Flowering plants visited by the bees include Eucalyptus camaldulensis.

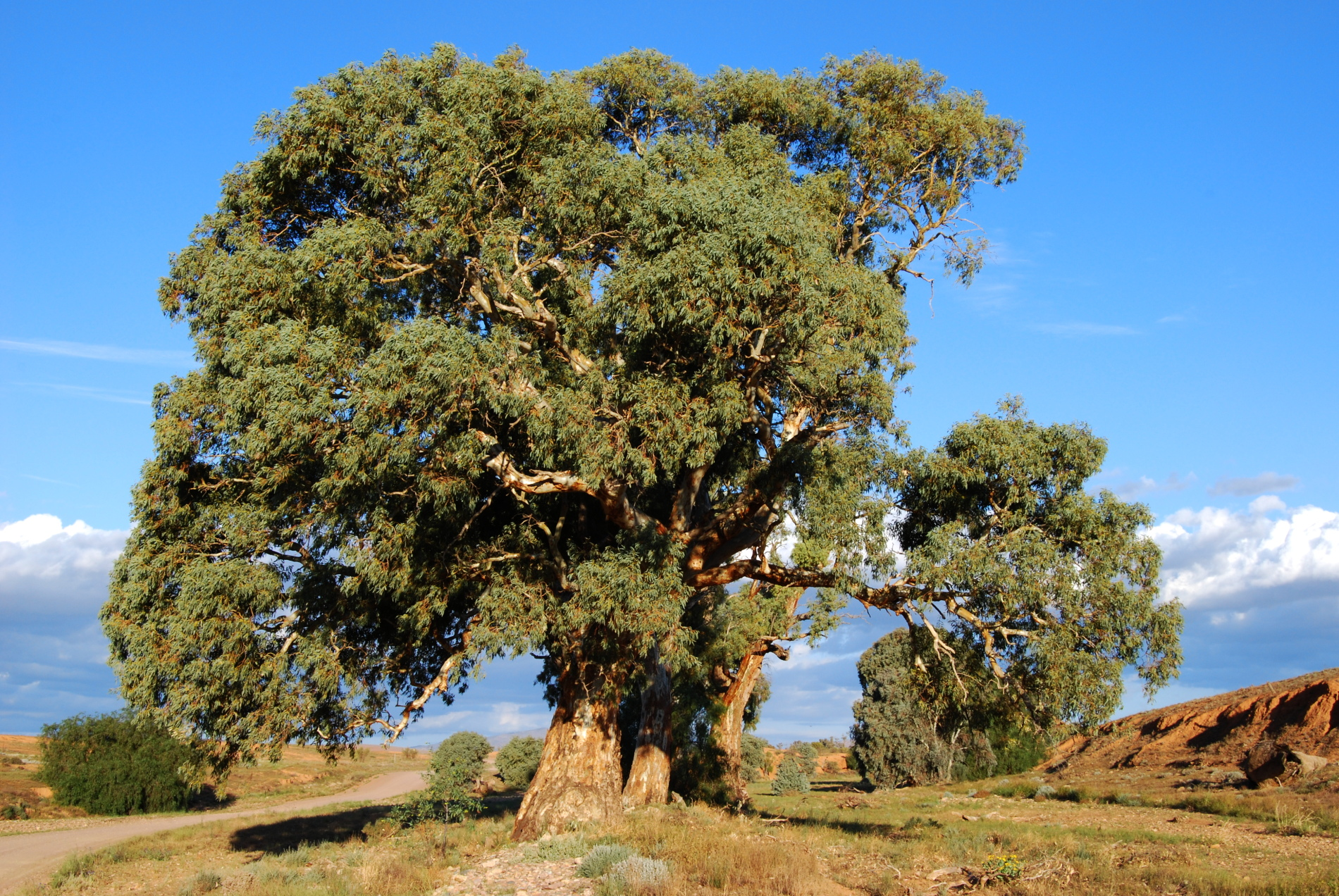
Eucalyptus camaldulensis (river red gum), a forage plant of the bees
