= Wentworth Airport =

- IATA: none; ICAO: YWTO

Summary
- Operator: Shire of Wentworth
- Location: Wentworth, New South Wales
- Elevation AMSL: 120 ft / 37 m
- Coordinates: 34°05′18″S 141°53′30″E

Map
- Location in New South Wales

Runways
Direction	Length		Surface
Direction	m	ft	Surface
17/35	936	3,071	Clay
08/26	1,108	3,635	Gravel
- Sources: Australian AIP

Wentworth Airport (ICAO: YWTO) is located at Wentworth, New South Wales, Australia.

Sunraysia Sport Aircraft Club hosts a fly-in each year on Queens Birthday weekend.

Wentworth Airport is adjacent to the Perry Sandhills.

== See also ==
- List of airports in New South Wales
- Mildura Airport in Victoria, a nearby airport with scheduled services
