= Perry Sandhills =

Sandhills near Wentworth, NSW, Australia

The Perry Sandhills are located 6 km west of Wentworth, New South Wales, Australia, on the old Renmark Road, near the junction of the Murray and Darling rivers. The sandhills are adjacent to the Wentworth Airport.

Each year, the sandhills are used for Music Under The Stars, part of the Mildura Wentworth Arts Festival. Artists performing have included Archie Roach, Ben Lee and Paul Kelly.

The sandhills cover an area of approximately 160 hectares (400 acres), and have been formed over the past 40,000 years by wind erosion. They are continually shifting due to the wind.

As the sands move, evidence is periodically uncovered of prehistoric animals and Aboriginal use of the sandhills area.

During World War II, the sandhills were used as a bombing range.
