= Wentworth Gaol =

Heritage listed site in New South Wales, Australia

Old Wentworth Jail
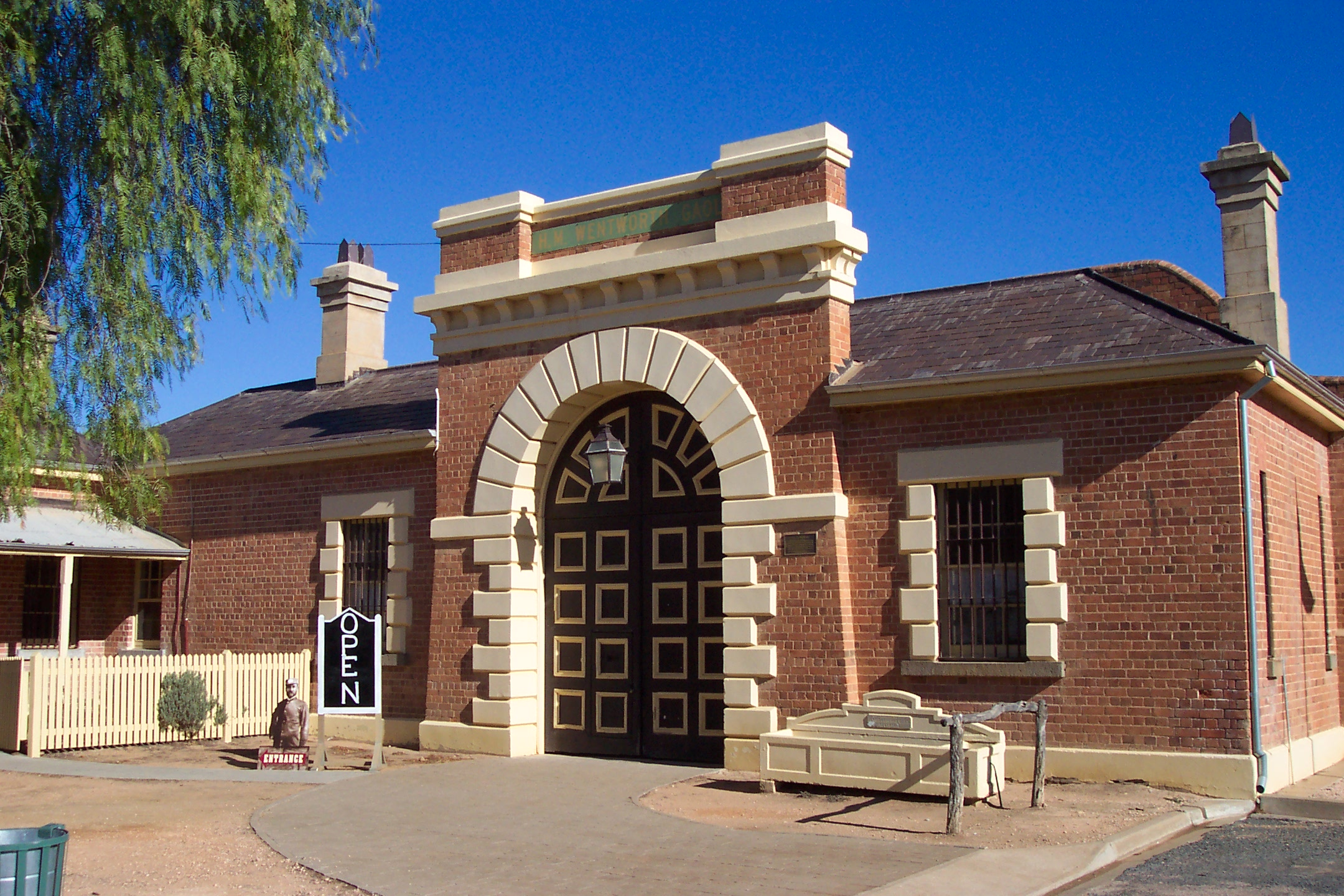
- The gatehouse of the Wentworth Gaol (1881 – 1927)

- Location in New South Wales
- Location: 112 Beverley Street, Wentworth, New South Wales; 34°06′09″S 141°54′48″E
- Status: Closed; Tourist attraction
- Opened: 1881
- Closed: 1 July 1928
- Managed by: Department of Prisons (1881–1928); Wentworth Shire (1928–present)

New South Wales Heritage Register
- Official name: Old Wentworth Gaol; Wentworth Gaol (former)
- Type: State heritage (complex / group)
- Designated: 21 October 2016
- Reference no.: 1982
- Type: Gaol/Lock-up
- Category: Law Enforcement
- Builders: Whitcombe Brothers, Hay

The Wentworth Gaol is a heritage-listed former gaol and school building and now museum (gaol building) and old wares shop (gaolers residence) located at 112 Beverley Street, Wentworth, in the Wentworth Shire, New South Wales, Australia. It was designed by James Barnet and built from 1879 to 1881 by Whitcombe Brothers, Hay. It is also known as the Old Wentworth Gaol. The property is owned by Department of Primary Industries - Western Lands Commissioner, an agency of the Government of New South Wales. The property was added to the New South Wales State Heritage Register on 21 October 2016.

== History ==
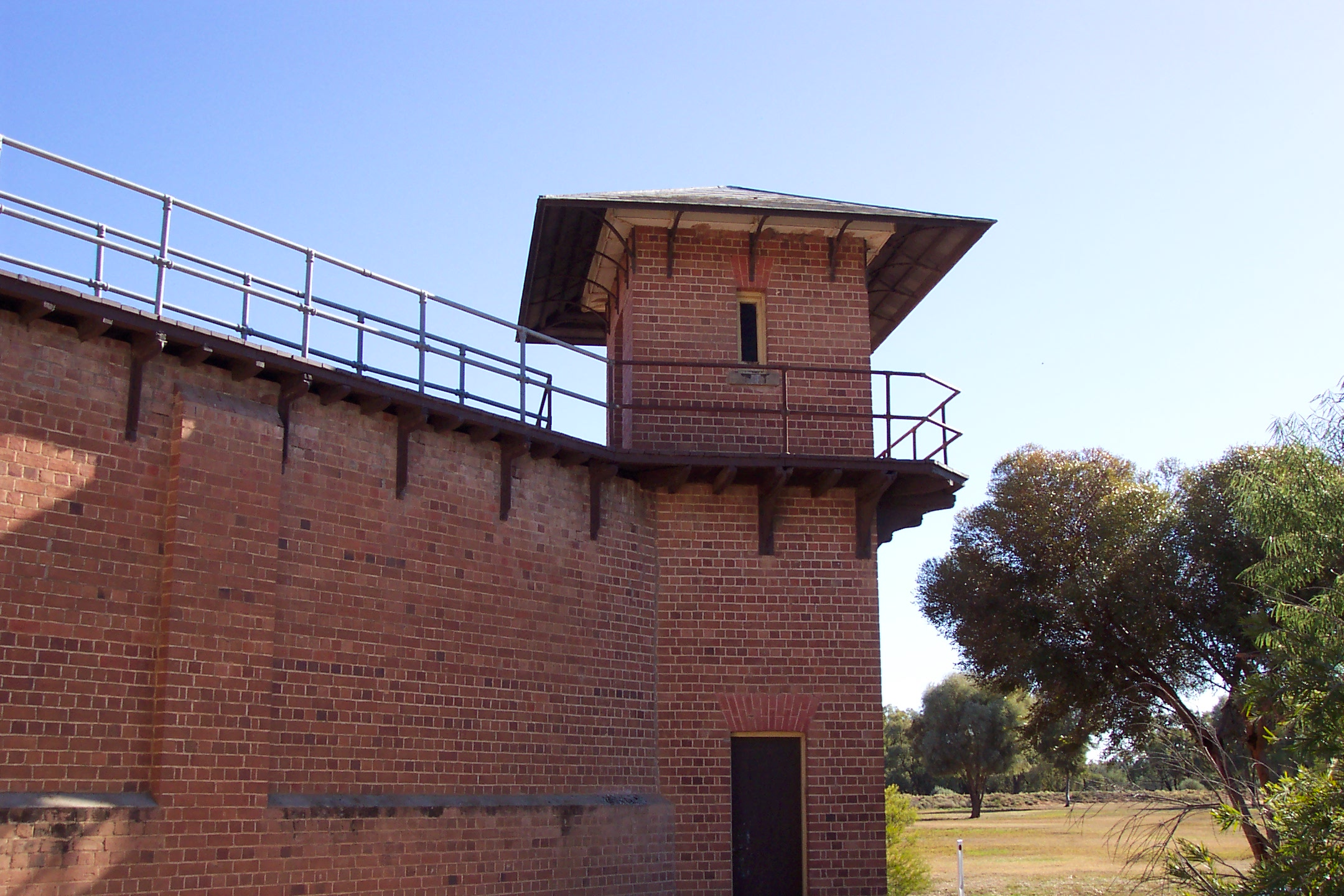
Gaol watch house.

The junction of the Murray River and the Darling River are the traditional lands of the Paakantyi and Maraura peoples. There is an extensive and rich archaeological heritage that documents their occupation of the lower Darling and Murray River areas; regionally this occupation dates back some 45,000 years, and there are numerous locations along the Murray and Darling Rivers that contain evidence of Aboriginal occupation from around 20,000 years ago up to the present.

In 1829 the NSW Government dispatched an exploratory party to trace the Murrumbidgee River under the leadership of Charles Sturt. Sturt, the first European to venture into the Murray - Darling region, followed the Murrumbidgee to its junction with the Murray River, then downstream to its junction with the Darling River. Sturt encountered large numbers of Aboriginal people near the Murray/Darling junction, but his expedition featured generally peaceful, though wary, meetings and interactions. Subsequent expeditions in the region, like that led by Major Thomas Mitchell in 1836, were marred by violence. In 1836 Mitchell commenced his 3rd expedition into the interior of Australia with the aim of completing a survey of the Darling River. Between Euston and Mildura, at a location now known as Mt Dispersion, the exploratory group were followed by a group of up to 180 Aborigines. Mitchell organised an ambush and at least 7 Aborigines were killed, and 70 or 80 shots fired.

In 1838 Joseph Hawdon and Charles Bonney, the first of the "overlanders", drove cattle from New South Wales to Adelaide along the northern bank of the Murray River, crossing the lower Darling River en route. Other overlanders began to follow the same route, and the Murray/Darling junction became an established camp site known as Hawdon's Ford. The settlement was later referred to as the Darling Junction. Small scale conflicts between overlanders and Aboriginal people developed as more and more overlanders passed through, grazed and damaged the traditional lands of the Paakantyi and Maraura peoples. These conflicts with overlanders escalated, culminating in the infamous 1841 Rufus River massacre, at Lake Victoria, where some 35 Aborigines were shot by Police and overlanders.

Conflict between Aboriginal people and overlanders/pastoralists slowed after this massacre. Aboriginal people were dispossessed of their lands, and were forced to join the workforce of the expanding pastoral industry. In the 1840s squatters became established over the land along the Darling and Murray Rivers and gradually expanded their holdings westwards from the Murrumbidgee and north eastwards from South Australia.

Moorna Station, just downstream of the Murray/Darling junction, was established in 1847 and became the base for government administration in the area. The Lower Darling Land District was created in 1847, and subdivided north–south along the Darling River into the Albert and Lower Darling land districts in 1851. The first Crown Land Commissioners for the district were appointed in November 1851 (Stephen Cole, Lower Darling District and Patrick Brougham to the Albert District) and were based at Moorna, along with the Court of Petty Sessions and Native Police. Moorna township was surveyed in 1859 and town lots auctioned, but when the Land Commissioner and native police were moved to Wentworth in c. 1859, Moorna did not develop as a town. Hawdon's Ford or Darling Junction was officially renamed Wentworth, after the New South Wales explorer and politician William Wentworth, on 21 June 1859.

In mid-1857 Edmund Morris Lockyer was appointed second Lieutenant in the Native Police, Lower Darling District, and Alexander Tod Perry was appointed second lieutenant in the Native Police, Albert District. The first means of detention used in Wentworth was a huge tree trunk at the corner of Adelaide and Darling St. with a bullock chain and ring bolt, to which prisoners were handcuffed. The next lockup was a slab hut, located at the southern end of Darling Street opposite the end of Darling St. This lockup or the Wentworth police Watch-house was used to confine prisoners with sentences of fourteen days or less, and was proclaimed to be a prison on 1 December 1870.

By the 1860s the lockup was enlarged to three rooms but it was apparent that a new gaol was needed. Some necessary improvements to prisoner accommodation were effected during 1877 after which the Gaol was reported to house three separated and nine associated prisoners. In late 1875 the gaol could not shelter all 12 prisoners, and 3 were chained outside. Passionate pleas to the Colonial Secretary described the overcrowded conditions in the gaol as a "disgrace", "shameful", and as the 'Wentworth Black Hole". There are reports of some improvements to prisoner accommodation during 1877 after which the Gaol was reported to house three separated and nine associated prisoners.

On 1 January 1877 a letter from the Controller General of Prisons to the Colonial Secretary requested that a site be dedicated for the projected new gaol at Wentworth. On 30 April 1877 the Comptroller General wrote to the Colonial architect "having conferred with the inspector of Police I am of the opinion that the Gaol should be designed as one of the class now building at Young. If it were practicable to erect only a portion of the designed buildings at the present time, it would be desirable-but provision for a Hospital, Surgery and bath house should be made". By 23 April 1878 a plan has been drawn up and by 14 August 1878 a "Reservation of zero point eight one hectares (two acres) being portion no. 47 of site for Wentworth Gaol was completed.

The gaol was erected in 1879 by Whitcombe Bros. of Hay. The contract price is believed to have been A£14,000 and bricks were locally produced by Joseph Fritsch. Malmsbury bluestone was transported by rail to Kerang then by bullock wagon for use in the gaol. The gaol was erected to include a quadrangle, cell block (with ten male and two female cells), kitchen, hospital, storeroom, block, gaol warden's residence and two observation towers. The kitchen block was described as showing evidence of careful planning in preparation of meals for prisoners. Next to the kitchen was the bathroom equipped with a bath and shower on a concrete base. The gaol included a well-stocked library. The staff consisted of three warders and there was as many as 18 prisoners locked up at any one time. The small single storey brick gaol with bluestone trim was designed by colonial architect James Barnet and built between 1879 and 1881. It was one of the earliest Australian – designed gaols together with Hay Gaol (1880), Dubbo Gaol (1871) and Long Bay Gaol (1909 and 1914).

Government records show that the first Acting Gaoler, James Sheringham was appointed on 5 September 1891, together with Susan Sheringham, who was appointed as Acting Matron on the same day.

With the erection of other gaols at Silverton (1889), Broken Hill (1892) and Goulburn (1884) the need for a gaol at Wentworth declined. The gaol closed in 1928 after the two final prisoners, who had been sentenced on 9 February 1928, were transferred to the Broken Hill Gaol on 27 February 1928, which is possibly the official date of closure. When the Prisons Act, 1899 (NSW) was enacted, Wentworth Gaol was one of those listed in the second schedule as existing 'public gaols, prisons or houses of correction'. The gaol was officially de-established as a prison on 1 July 1928.

In 1935 the hospital block was remodelled and converted into additional class rooms for Wentworth Central School. Over a hundred pupils used the gaol, which also became of interest to visitors / tourists in the 1950s. In 1963 the students left the gaol when new school classrooms were constructed.

Wentworth Gaol was temporarily re-used in 1962 when riots in Mildura prompted the need to utilise the cells at Wentworth.

In the mid-1970s some restoration works were undertaken by E. A. Farmer, Government Architect. In 1981 Mr. Peter Kiely took over the lease and ran the gaol as a tourist attraction, retaining the cottage as a residence, and from 2000, Mr. Paul Swarbrick has been the lessee. The cottage is currently used as an entry and shop for selling old wares.

== Description ==
Wentworth Gaol is a single-storey brick gaol with bluestone trim, designed by Colonial Architect, James Barnet, and built between 1879 and 1881. The gaol is located on the north western margin of the Wentworth township, and is surrounded by flat vacant lands to the north and west. The Wentworth flood levee passes through the western margin on the curtilage, 20 to 30 metres (66 to 98 ft) outside the gaol's western wall.

The form of the buildings is generally a series of pavilions having hipped slate roofs enclosed within a high brick wall. The gaol is an example of James Barnet's Hay-type gaol. The classification is defined by J.S. Kerr (1988) which differentiates Barnet's Hay-type gaol from the more common Braidwood-type gaol design of the previous colonial architect. The main difference between the two designs is that the Hay-type gaol is single-storey and the cells larger than the two-storey Braidwood-type gaol.

The gaol consists of a 4m high brick walled compound, accessed through an elaborate entrance with rendered quoins, rendered voussoirs in the semi-circular arch, and a prominent keystone. Two guards' offices are located just inside the doors, and an attached gaoler's residence is to the south of the entrance. On each diagonal corner of the compound walls there is a watch tower with a short catwalk. Within the compound there are two buildings. The rectangular Cell Block of 10 male and 2 female cells, and the L-shaped Hospital Wing. Construction is solid brick, produced locally, on Malmsbury bluestone (basalt) footings for the cell block, and brick footings elsewhere. Basalt is used for door thresholds, window sills and lintols. All the roofs are clad with Welsh slate. All joinery timber and floor and ceiling lining boards are painted Murray pine. There is a well in the courtyard which originally took the rainwater from the roofs. There are six fireplaces with black marble overmantels and surrounds.

=== Condition ===
As at 15 March 2016, the condition of the fabric is generally considered to be excellent. Most surfaces externally and internally have been restored and maintained over the last 20 years.

Since 1995 the Council of Wentworth Shire has undertaken a comprehensive restoration program including repairs to all slate roofs, new guttering, salt protection to brick walls, external and internal painting and interpretation. Most surfaces externally and internally have been restored and maintained over the last 20 years. In 2012 a project was completed to restore deteriorating brickwork through the injection of silicone at the base perimeter walls, painting of the gaol buildings, improved drainage and landscaping of the surrounds.

The former gaol is now a tourism attraction for the region, and is open for public tours, from 10:00am to 5:00pm local time, Monday to Friday.

=== Modifications and dates ===
The gaol is almost intact in its planning and original construction materials. The only major modification which has been undertaken was to the hospital block. In 1935 this building was modified for use as a school, including removal of some internal walls, a chimney and changes to windows. The hospital, bathroom and dispensary were combined into an L-shaped class room. Two huge copper stands have been removed from the gaol laundry. In the court yard the solitary confinement cell and the toilets have been demolished.

Between 1975 and 2012 restoration works have been undertaken in a range of large and small projects. From 1986 onwards these works have been undertaken in accord with a conservation plan prepared by Elizabeth Vines, Heritage Consultant.

== Heritage listing ==
Old Wentworth Gaol is of state heritage significance as one of the country gaols erected in the 19th century across the state to cope with the burgeoning prison population as colonists spread through the interior of NSW. Constructed between 1879 and 1881 to the design of the prominent NSW Colonial Architect James Barnet, the former site of incarceration is a substantially intact and rare example of Barnet's "Hay-type" gaol.

Old Wentworth Gaol is also of state heritage significance for its research, archaeological and interpretive potential to contribute to the understanding of crime, punishment and incarceration in the late 19th and early 20th centuries in NSW.

Old Wentworth Gaol was listed on the New South Wales State Heritage Register on 21 October 2016 having satisfied the following criteria.

The place is important in demonstrating the course, or pattern, of cultural or natural history in New South Wales.

Old Wentworth Gaol is of state heritage significance as one of the country gaols erected in the 19th century across the state to cope with the burgeoning prison population as colonists spread through the interior of NSW. The gaol was constructed between 1879 and 1881 and its position in Wentworth indicates the importance of Wentworth, at that time, as a regional transport and administrative centre.

The place has a strong or special association with a person, or group of persons, of importance of cultural or natural history of New South Wales's history.

Old Wentworth Gaol is of state heritage significance for its association with the prominent architect James Barnet who, during his twenty-five year term as NSW Colonial Architect from 1865 to 1890, had an important influence on NSW civic architecture. Barnet designed Wentworth Gaol and was responsible for some of Sydney's most prominent public buildings, including the General Post Office, as well as defence works at Port Jackson, Botany Bay and Newcastle, and court-houses, gaols, lock-ups, police stations, post offices and numerous lighthouses throughout regional NSW.

The place is important in demonstrating aesthetic characteristics and/or a high degree of creative or technical achievement in New South Wales.

Old Wentworth Gaol is of state heritage significance for its high aesthetic and technical values as a substantially intact example of James Barnet's "Hay-type" gaol. Standing alone on the edge of Wentworth, the former gaol retains its remote, austere and foreboding penal atmosphere.

The place has a strong or special association with a particular community or cultural group in New South Wales for social, cultural or spiritual reasons.

It does not appear to meet this criterion of state significance.

The place has potential to yield information that will contribute to an understanding of the cultural or natural history of New South Wales.

Old Wentworth Gaol is of state heritage significance for its research, archaeological and interpretive potential to contribute to the understanding of crime, punishment and incarceration in the late 19th and early 20th centuries in NSW. Embodied in its physical fabric and documentary history, the Old Wentworth Gaol is an educational resource that has the potential to further inform us about the social and cultural history of penal institutions in NSW.

The place possesses uncommon, rare or endangered aspects of the cultural or natural history of New South Wales.

Old Wentworth Gaol is of state heritage significance as a rare and substantially intact example of NSW Colonial Architect James Barnet's "Hay-type" gaol.

The place is important in demonstrating the principal characteristics of a class of cultural or natural places/environments in New South Wales.

Old Wentworth Gaol is of state heritage significance as a representative example of colonial incarceration and demonstrates how social and architectural planning considerations were applied to crime and punishment in NSW in the 19th century. Furthermore, the Old Wentworth Gaol may be of state heritage significance as a substantially intact example of the NSW Colonial Architect James Barnet's "Hay-type" gaol.

== See also ==
- Punishment in Australia
