= Wentworth, New South Wales =

Wentworth
- Town
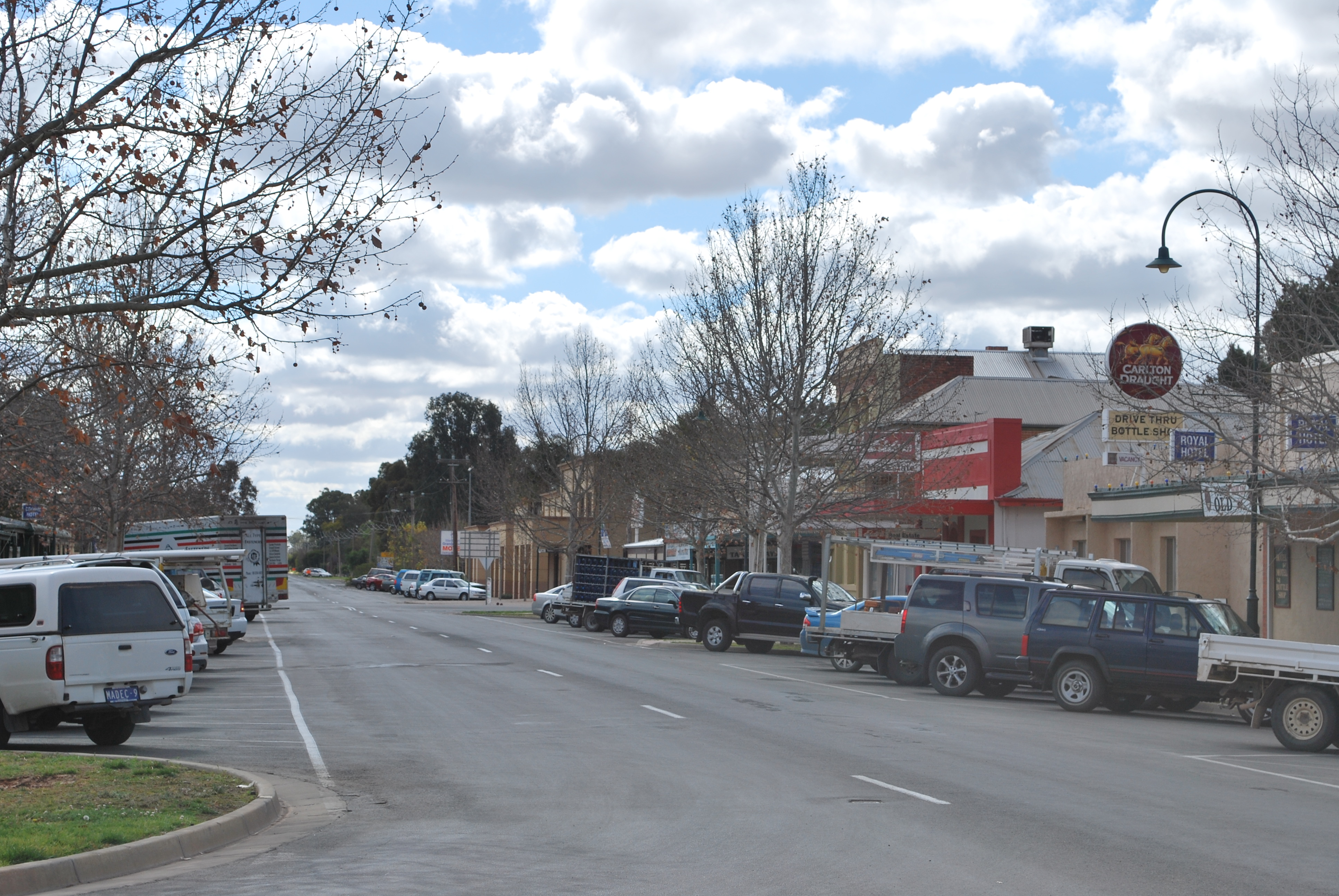
- Darling Street, Wentworth

- Coordinates: 34°05′0″S 141°54′0″E
- Country: Australia
- State: New South Wales
- LGA: Wentworth Shire
- Location: 1,034 km (642 mi) from Sydney; 570 km (350 mi) from Melbourne; 266 km (165 mi) from Broken Hill; 34 km (21 mi) from Mildura

Government
  - State electorate: Murray
  - Federal division: Farrer
- Elevation: 37.0 m (121.4 ft)

Population
  - Total: 1,221 (2016 census)
- Postcode: 2648
- Mean max temp: 24.3 °C (75.7 °F)
- Mean min temp: 10.9 °C (51.6 °F)
- Annual rainfall: 283.9 mm (11.18 in)

Wentworth is a small border town in the far southwest of the state of New South Wales, Australia. It lies at the confluence of Australia's two most important rivers, the Darling and the Murray, the latter forming the border with the state of Victoria to the south. The border with the state of South Australia lies approximately 100 kilometres (62 mi) to the west. The town of Wentworth is in the local government area of the same name.

== History ==
Named after the famous explorer and politician William Charles Wentworth in 1859, the town is 34 kilometres (21 mi) to the west (via the Calder Highway) of the Victorian regional city of Mildura. The famous mining city of Broken Hill is 266 kilometres (165 mi) to the north along the Silver City Highway.

Moorna Post Office opened on 22 February 1855 and was renamed Wentworth in 1860.

In 1876, Wentworth township was described in the following terms:

Wentworth is situated on the Darling, about half a mile from the junction, and is plainly visible from the Murray. The township is built on rising ground, and, save in very exceptional seasons, is quite out of reach of flood waters. The population is between 400 and 500. The place appears prosperous and progressive. The trade up the Darling River, and the supply of stores to the stations in the vicinity, form the life-blood of its prosperity. Wentworth possesses a custom-house – a hideous little building resembling a watch-house, and as great an eyesore as the cause of its establishment is an inconvenience and annoyance to trade. The other public buildings are a post and telegraph office, for Wentworth is on the main telegraph line to Adelaide, and a court-house and offices, which are also used for land offices. There is a resident police magistrate, Mr. Richardson ... The two churches in Wentworth are buildings creditable to the town. The Roman Catholic Church is a brick structure, the Protestant Church an edifice of brick and stone... There are three or four stores of considerable size, and several hotels. The Australian Joint Stock Bank has a branch here. The river, which, opposite the town is about the width of the Murray at Echuca, is crossed by a punt.

Historical population
Year	Pop.	±%
1921	817	—
1933	849	+3.9%
1947	2,528	+197.8%
1954	4,034	+59.6%
1961	1,154	−71.4%
1966	1,084	−6.1%
1971	1,037	−4.3%
1976	1,136	+9.5%
1981	1,180	+3.9%
1986	1,352	+14.6%
1991	1,447	+7.0%
1996	1,504	+3.9%
2001	1,430	−4.9%
2006	1,303	−8.9%
2011	1,227	−5.8%
2016	1,221	−0.5%
2021	1,305	+6.9%
Source: Australian Bureau of Statistics data.

== Heritage listings ==
Wentworth has a number of heritage-listed sites, including:

- 112 Beverley Street: Wentworth Gaol
- 30 Cadell Street: Saint Ignatius School, Wentworth
- Darling Street: St John's Anglican Church, Wentworth
- 1122a Low Darling Road: Avoca Homestead Complex

== Railways ==
During the late 1800s Wentworth was an important river port; however, like many such towns, its significance faded with the development of the railways. In 1902, the people of Wentworth were lobbying for a railway from Mildura to be built, including a bridge over the Murray River.

The town is nowadays served by NSW TrainLink coach services, connecting it to Broken Hill, from which trains operate to Sydney, and Mildura.

== Floods ==
The town has been flooded many times by the two rivers. The most significant was in 1956, when both rivers flooded simultaneously. Local farmers, supplemented by the army and navy, worked for months to build levee banks to hold the water out of the town.

== Visitor attractions ==
Wentworth is now an distinct tourist outback destination and provides a welcome break for those travelling to or from Broken Hill. The town offers some attractions:

- PS Ruby – a restored 1907 side-wheel paddlesteamer
- The 5 yearly Great Wentworth Tractor Rally
- The Wentworth Gaol
- The Perry Sandhills

The Great Wentworth Tractor Rally is a commemoration of the grey Fergie tractors that were used to maintain the levee banks and save the town from the 1956 Murray River flood.

Wentworth was a popular destination for 'pokie tour' bus rides from Adelaide, the capital city of South Australia, prior to the legalisation of poker (gambling) machines in that state.

== Sport ==
The town has an Australian rules football team competing in the Sunraysia Football League.

And the Wentworth District Rowing Club has regular regattas and attendance at national and international events.

== Notable people ==
- Jarrod Brander, Australian rules footballer
- Leal Douglas, actress, lived in Wentworth in the 1930s.
- Derek Eggmolesse-Smith, Australian rules footballer
- Jamie Lawson, Australian rules footballer
- Ben McGlynn, Australian rules footballer
- Brian Winton, Australian rules footballer

== Climate ==
Wentworth has a Semi-arid climate (BSh) with hot summers and mild winters. Historical maxima and minima are 48.6C and −2.8 °C, respectively.

Climate data for Wentworth, NSW (temps 1907–1967; precip 1868–present)
Month	Jan	Feb	Mar	Apr	May	Jun	Jul	Aug	Sep	Oct	Nov	Dec	Year
Record high °C (°F)	48.1 (118.6)	45.6 (114.1)	43.3 (109.9)	36.7 (98.1)	31.7 (89.1)	25.6 (78.1)	26.4 (79.5)	31.1 (88.0)	36.7 (98.1)	40.0 (104.0)	42.8 (109.0)	46.1 (115.0)	48.1 (118.6)
Mean daily maximum °C (°F)	32.9 (91.2)	32.3 (90.1)	29.2 (84.6)	24.0 (75.2)	19.5 (67.1)	16.1 (61.0)	15.6 (60.1)	17.6 (63.7)	21.1 (70.0)	24.5 (76.1)	28.3 (82.9)	31.1 (88.0)	24.3 (75.7)
Mean daily minimum °C (°F)	17.1 (62.8)	16.8 (62.2)	14.5 (58.1)	10.6 (51.1)	7.9 (46.2)	5.8 (42.4)	4.8 (40.6)	6.0 (42.8)	8.1 (46.6)	10.8 (51.4)	13.4 (56.1)	15.7 (60.3)	11.0 (51.8)
Record low °C (°F)	9.4 (48.9)	8.3 (46.9)	6.1 (43.0)	3.3 (37.9)	0.0 (32.0)	−1.7 (28.9)	−2.8 (27.0)	−0.6 (30.9)	1.7 (35.1)	2.8 (37.0)	5.0 (41.0)	8.3 (46.9)	−2.8 (27.0)
Average precipitation mm (inches)	21.2 (0.83)	21.4 (0.84)	19.5 (0.77)	18.6 (0.73)	27.5 (1.08)	26.1 (1.03)	23.7 (0.93)	25.7 (1.01)	26.6 (1.05)	27.2 (1.07)	24.9 (0.98)	22.0 (0.87)	284.9 (11.22)
Average precipitation days	2.9	2.6	2.9	3.7	5.8	7.1	7.5	7.4	6.1	5.4	4.4	3.3	59.1

== Gallery ==
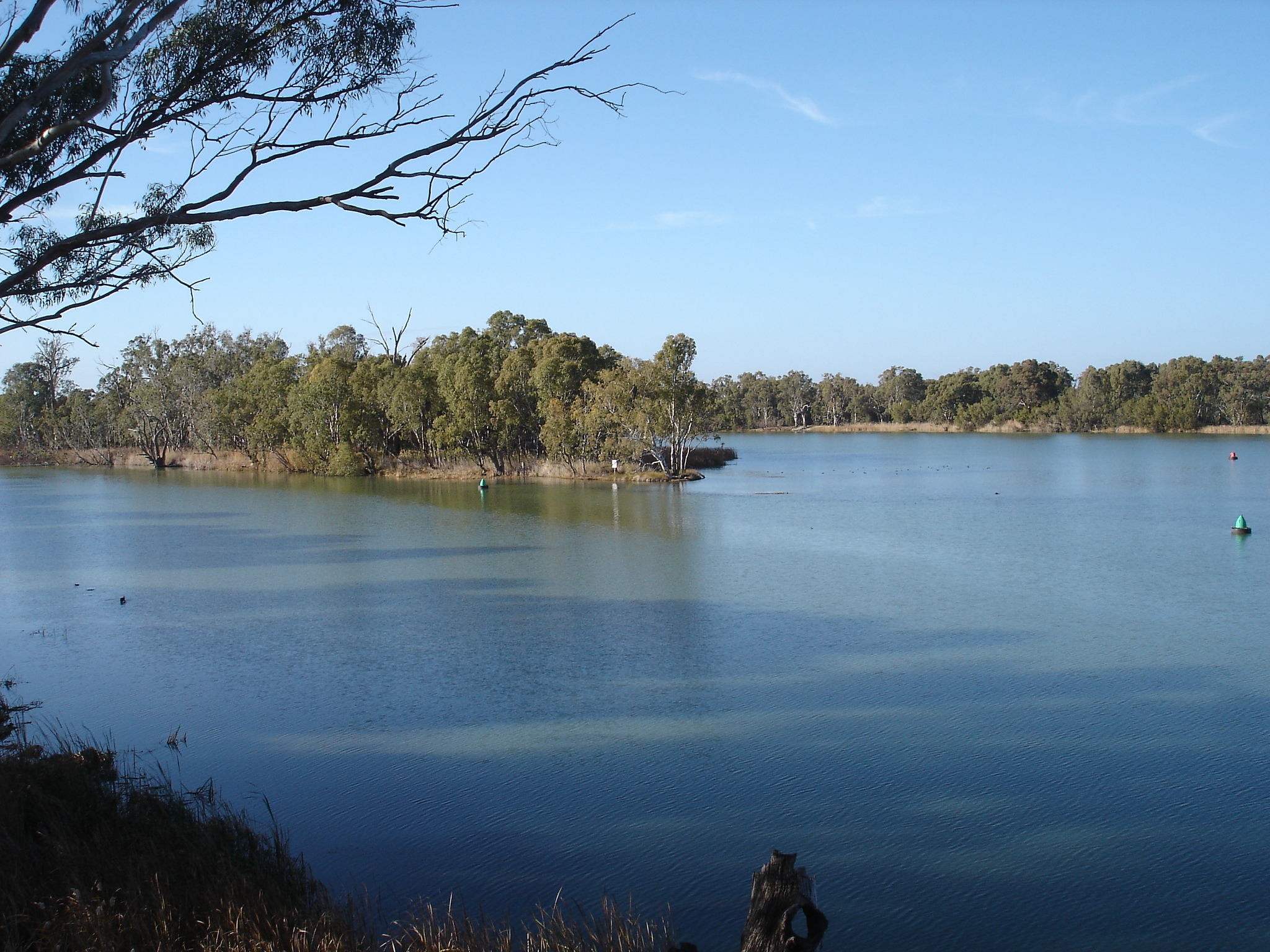
Confluence of the Darling with the Murray River

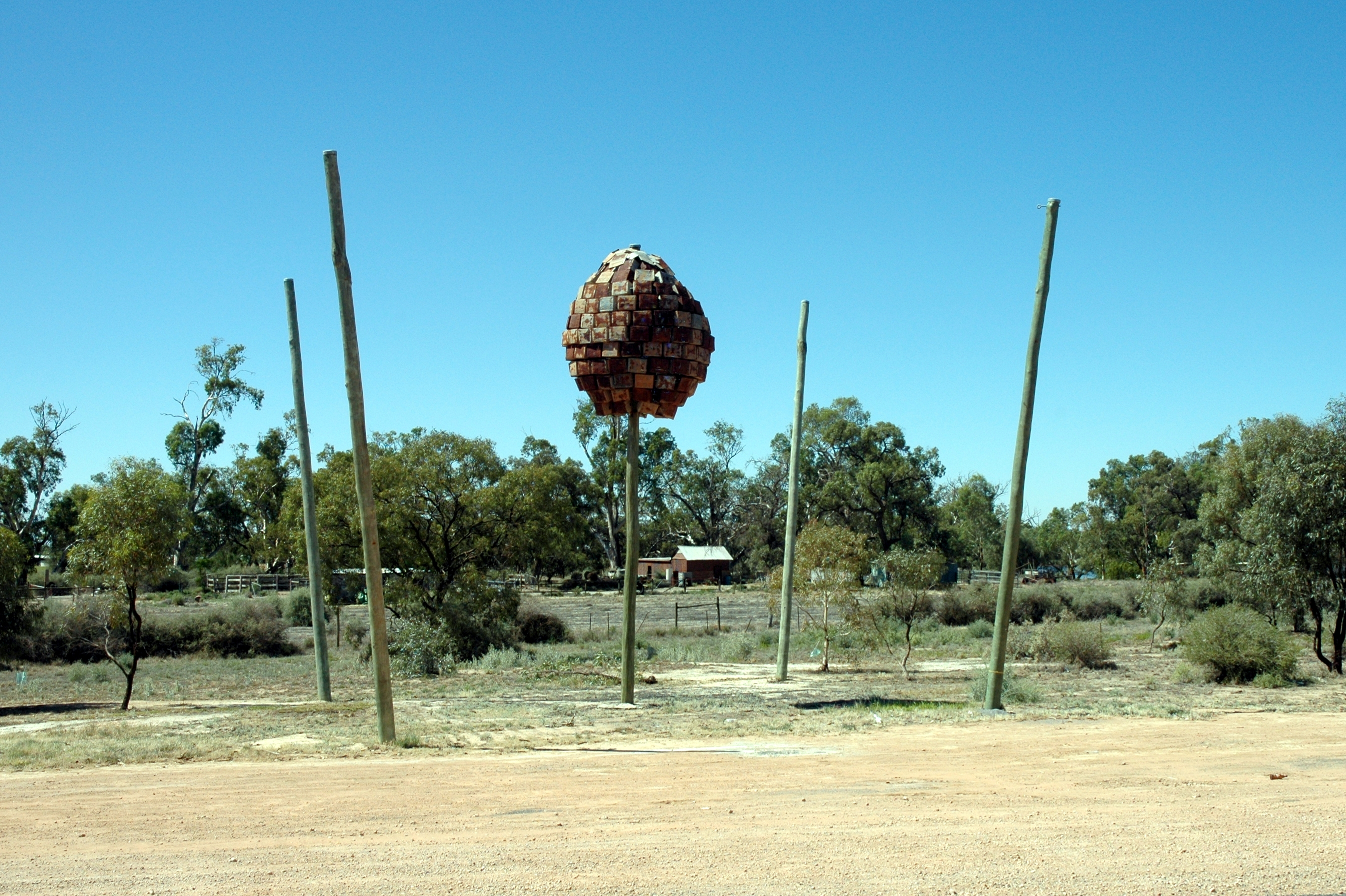
Roadside sculpture, Wentworth, NSW, Australia

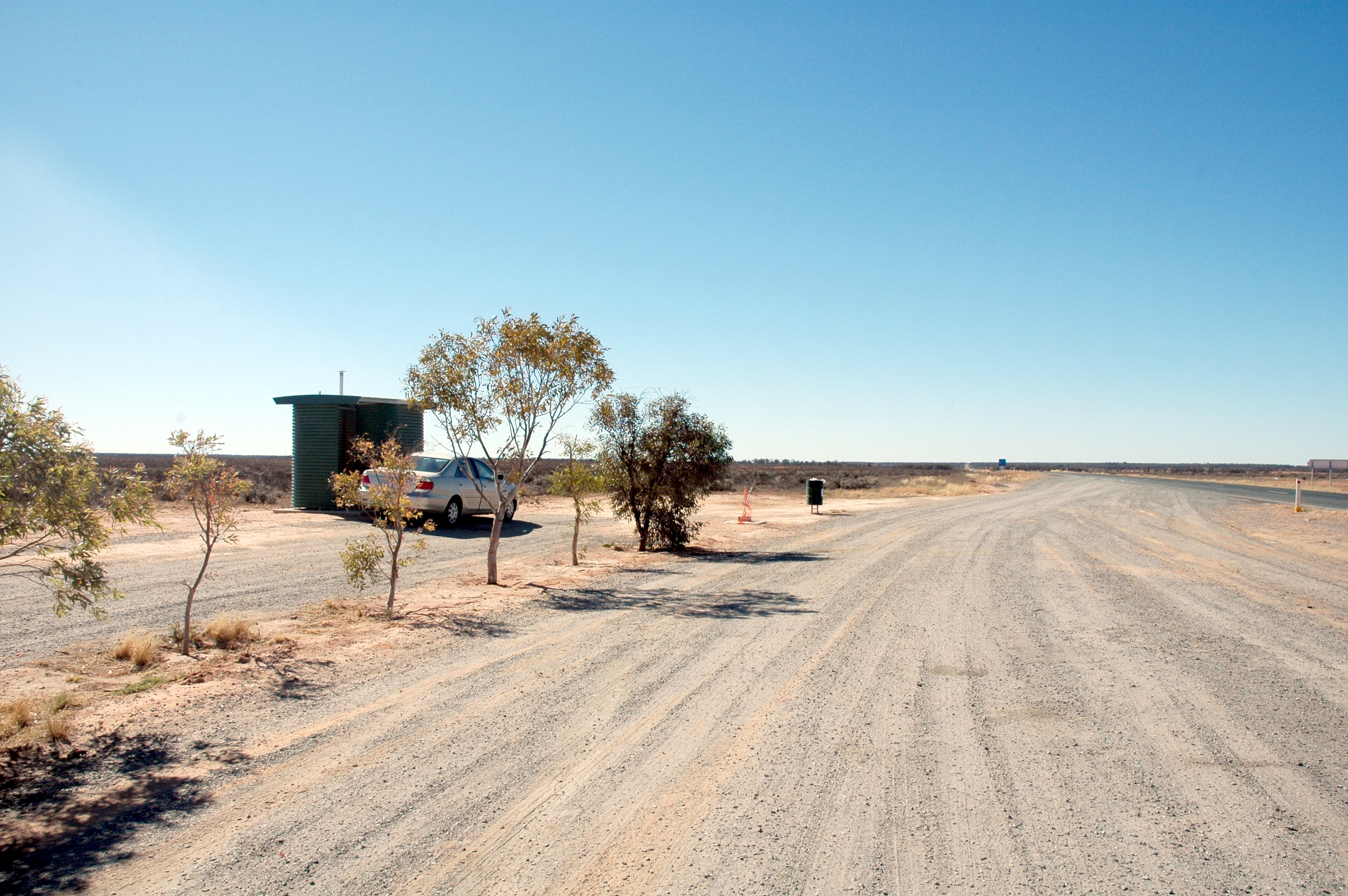
Semi-arid countryside; roadside rest stop 20 km north of Wentworth
