= Wynyard =

Wynyard may refer to:

== Places ==
=== Australia ===
- Wynyard, New South Wales, a district of Sydney CBD
  - Wynyard railway station, Sydney
- Wynyard, Tasmania
- Wynyard County, in the Murrumbidgee–Tumut region of New South Wales
- Wynyard Park, Sydney, a large park in central Sydney

=== United Kingdom ===
- Wynyard, County Durham, a garden village in County Durham
- Wynyard Hall, a country house in Wynyard, County Durham
- Wynyard School, a former school in Watford, Hertfordshire

=== Other countries ===
- Wynyard, Saskatchewan, a town in east-central Saskatchewan
- Wynyard Quarter, a waterfront precinct within Auckland CBD

== People ==
- Diana Wynyard (1906–1964), born Dorothy Isobel Cox; English stage and film actress
- Edward Buckley Wynyard (1788–1864), English-born Australian military figure and politician
- James Wynyard (1914–1942), New Zealand rugby union player
- Richard Wynyard, New Zealand rugby union and rugby league player
- Robert Wynyard (1802–1864), British Army officer and New Zealand colonial administrator
- Jason Wynyard (fl. 2015), New Zealand woodchopper
- Tai Wynyard (b. 1998), New Zealand basketball player; son of Jason
- William Wynyard (British Army officer) (1759–1819), one time General Officer Commanding Northern District
- William Wynyard (rugby league) "Billy" (1882–1932), New Zealand rugby union and rugby league player
