= General Wynyard =

General Wynyard may refer to:

- Edward Buckley Wynyard (1788–1864) was a British Army general
- Henry Wynyard (1761–1838), British Army general
- John Wynyard (died 1752), British Army lieutenant general
- William Wynyard (British Army officer) (1759–1819), British Army lieutenant general
