= Metropolitan Hotel, Sydney =

Heritage-listed hotel in Sydney, Australia

Metropolitan Hotel
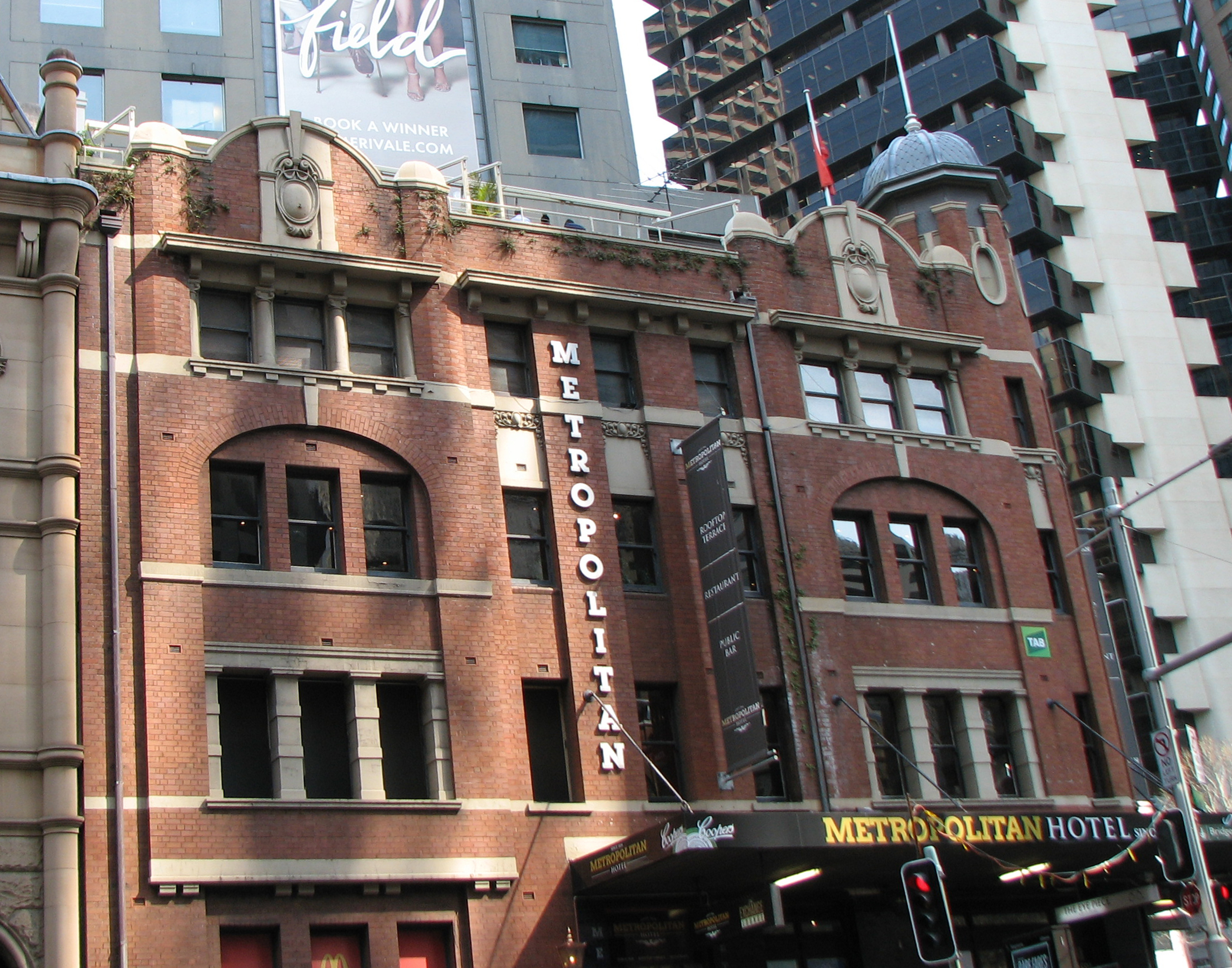

- Location within Sydney Location within Australia
- 33.8639°S 151.2077°E
- Location: 244 George Street, Sydney, Australia

New South Wales Heritage Register
- Official name: Metropolitan Hotel
- Type: state heritage (built)
- Designated: 2 April 1999
- Reference no.: 663
- Type: Hotel
- Category: Commercial

Metropolitan Hotel is a heritage-listed hotel at 244 George Street, Sydney, Australia. It was added to the New South Wales State Heritage Register on 2 April 1999.

== History ==
The coastal Aboriginal people around Sydney are known as the Eora. Central Sydney is therefore often referred to as "Eora Country". Within the City of Sydney local government area, the traditional owners are the Cadigal and Wangal bands of the Eora. European colonisation of the Sydney area began in 1788.

Prior to 1834 the site was Crown land, known as a lumber yard, of which the corner was leased by Graham Blaxcell. The site was released for development in 1834 and by 1848, Joseph Fowles in his book 'Sydney in 1848' indicates a substantial three-storey brick terrace of 4 bays which comprised a corner hotel joined by a dispensary, a tailors and a drapers shop. The hotel was named Castle Tavern in the Post Office Directory of 1851. By 1861 the name had changed to La Villa de Bordeaux and the publican was P. Wilson. In 1867 the building was vacant and the first recording of the name Metropolitan Hotel occurred in 1879 and has continued through till the present day. At the turn of the century the building was owned by the United Colonial Land Investment Co. and the hotel run by J. Donaldson. In 1909 the hotel was purchased by Tooth and Co. and the hotel and adjoining dispensary were redeveloped with a five-storey building. Half of the dispensary was left intact and formed an extension to the hotel with a bottle shop on the ground floor.

It was twice threatened with demolition in the 1980s: first by a consortium that wanted to redevelop a number of adjacent properties, and then by a proposal from developer Warren Anderson to demolish all but the facade for a high-rise office tower. The demolition plans did not proceed following a state government decision in February 1985 to protect a number of buildings on Bridge Street as a historic boulevard.

== Description ==
The Metropolitan Hotel is a four-storey face brick and sandstone building located on a prominent corner of George Street near Wynyard railway station. The building is designed in the Federation Free Style and features a façade divided into bays by projecting panels topped with sandstone detailed brick parapet decorated with round pediments with plaques, and an octagonal corner cupola with a zinc clad roof and oval cutouts. The public bar appears to have been decorated with Art Deco motifs, some of which have been retained in the latest fitout as a restaurant. The original timber doors have also been retained. The remaining bay of the original dispensary has some significant fabric in the front and side walls. The adjacent terrace has been opened up internally and incorporated into the building on the upper levels.

== Significance ==
The Metropolitan Hotel is significant for replacing a hotel on the same site dated 1851 and as replacing a hotel of the same name dated 1876. The Metropolitan is one of five hotels of this style in the city the others being the Harbour View Hotel, the Bristol Arms, the Lismore and the Ship Inn. The site is significant as part of the Crown grant dated pre 1834, and the hotel continues a long tradition with the hotel trade on the site. The building is significant as a fine and largely intact external example of the style used in a corner hotel, although the interiors have been extensively modified on the lower floors. The building is significant for its strong contribution to the character of the immediate area, and is significance as part of the network of small purpose built hotels providing a social / recreational venue and budget accommodation located within a short distance from Wynyard and Martin Place and in the centre of the CBD. It reflects the social character of the area during the early years of the twentieth century and is representative as an example of the evolutionary process of a small corner hotel at the fringes of the city.

== Heritage listing ==
Metropolitan Hotel was listed on the New South Wales State Heritage Register on 2 April 1999.
