= Waradgery County =

Waradgery New South Wales
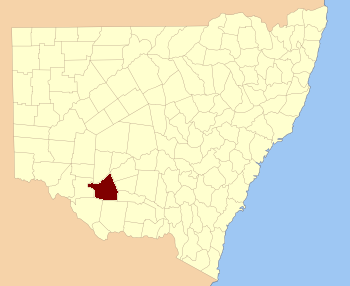
- Location in New South Wales
Lands administrative divisions around Waradgery:
Caira	Waljeers	Nicholson
Caira	Waradgery	Sturt
Wakool	Townsend	Boyd

Waradgery County is one of the 141 cadastral divisions of New South Wales. It contains the town of Hay. It includes the area between the Lachlan River and the Murrumbidgee River where they meet. The Lachlan River is the northern boundary of the county, and the Murrumbidgee for a small section is the southern boundary, but the county also includes some of the land to the south of the Murrumbidgee near Hay.

The name Waradgery is believed to be derived from a local Aboriginal word (probably in relation to the Wiradjuri people.

== Parishes within this county ==
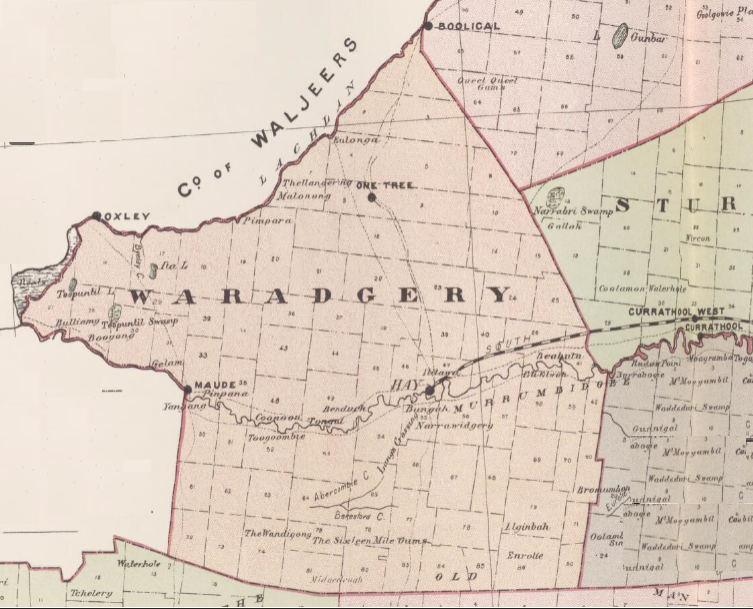
Wajadgery County NSW as shown on John Sands' 1886 map

A full list of parishes found within this county; their current LGA and mapping coordinates to the approximate centre of each location is as follows:

Parish	LGA	Coordinates
Abercrombie	Hay Shire Council	34°38′54″S 144°41′04″E
Beabula	Hay Shire Council	34°29′54″S 145°10′04″E
Bedarbidgal	Hay Shire Council	34°47′54″S 145°08′04″E
Benduck North	Hay Shire Council	34°25′54″S 144°35′04″E
Benduck South	Hay Shire Council	34°30′54″S 144°36′04″E
Beresford	Hay Shire Council	34°44′54″S 144°47′04″E
Boyong	Hay Shire Council	34°20′54″S 144°02′04″E
Brush	Hay Shire Council	34°36′54″S 145°00′04″E
Budgee	Hay Shire Council	34°21′54″S 144°19′04″E
Burrabogie	Hay Shire Council	34°33′54″S 145°11′04″E
Chambers	Hay Shire Council	34°47′54″S 144°00′04″E
Cluny	Hay Shire Council	34°20′54″S 144°36′04″E
Coonoon	Hay Shire Council	34°29′54″S 144°30′04″E
Cuba	Hay Shire Council	34°47′54″S 144°55′04″E
Darcoola	Hay Shire Council	34°21′54″S 144°28′04″E
Dowling	Hay Shire Council	34°13′54″S 144°24′04″E
East Waradgery	Hay Shire Council	34°29′54″S 144°54′04″E
Eli Elwah	Hay Shire Council	34°32′54″S 144°58′04″E
Eurolie	Hay Shire Council	34°44′54″S 145°09′04″E
Gelam	Hay Shire Council	34°21′54″S 144°11′04″E
Godfrey	Hay Shire Council	34°44′54″S 144°34′04″E
Grant	Hay Shire Council	34°14′54″S 145°06′04″E
Gre Gre	Hay Shire Council	34°37′54″S 144°30′04″E
Hay South	Hay Shire Council	34°32′54″S 144°52′04″E
Hay	Hay Shire Council	34°29′54″S 144°50′04″E
Hiawatha	Hay Shire Council	34°11′54″S 144°49′04″E
Ilginbah	Hay Shire Council	34°39′54″S 145°10′04″E
Illilawa	Hay Shire Council	34°20′54″S 145°00′04″E
Ina	Hay Shire Council	34°13′54″S 145°00′04″E
Jellalabad	Hay Shire Council	34°27′54″S 144°23′04″E
Jumbuck	Hay Shire Council	34°02′54″S 144°47′04″E
Killendoo	Hay Shire Council	34°44′54″S 145°04′04″E
Lang	Hay Shire Council	34°34′54″S 144°42′04″E
Lara	Hay Shire Council	34°12′54″S 144°48′04″E
Leura	Hay Shire Council	34°13′54″S 144°42′04″E
Lorraine	Hay Shire Council	34°19′54″S 144°50′04″E
Magnolia	Hay Shire Council	34°43′54″S 144°17′04″E
Maude	Hay Shire Council	34°26′54″S 144°19′04″E
Melrose	Hay Shire Council	34°44′54″S 144°40′04″E
Midgecleugh	Hay Shire Council	34°47′54″S 144°40′04″E
Mingah	Hay Shire Council	34°07′54″S 145°03′04″E
Mungadal	Hay Shire Council	34°32′54″S 144°47′04″E
Narrawidgery	Hay Shire Council	34°38′54″S 144°52′04″E
Nerang	Hay Shire Council	34°34′54″S 144°25′04″E
Oxley	Hay Shire Council	34°12′54″S 144°07′04″E
Palmer	Hay Shire Council	34°23′54″S 144°24′04″E
Paradise East	Hay Shire Council	34°47′54″S 144°49′04″E
Paradise	Hay Shire Council	34°47′54″S 144°45′04″E
Patterson	Hay Shire Council	34°09′54″S 144°36′04″E
Pembelgong	Hay Shire Council	34°31′54″S 145°07′04″E
Pevensey	Hay Shire Council	34°35′54″S 144°35′04″E
Pimpampa	Hay Shire Council	34°24′54″S 144°14′04″E
Quandong	Hay Shire Council	34°07′54″S 144°44′04″E
Rankin	Hay Shire Council	34°44′54″S 144°53′04″E
Russell	Hay Shire Council	34°43′54″S 144°27′04″E
Rutherford	Hay Shire Council	34°25′54″S 145°03′04″E
Simson	Hay Shire Council	34°00′54″S 144°50′04″E
Sinclair	Hay Shire Council	34°39′54″S 144°17′04″E
Thellangering West	Hay Shire Council	34°13′54″S 144°20′04″E
Thellangering	Hay Shire Council	34°12′54″S 144°31′04″E
Tindale	Hay Shire Council	34°38′54″S 144°56′04″E
Tongul	Hay Shire Council	34°29′54″S 144°41′04″E
Toogimbie	Hay Shire Council	34°34′54″S 144°30′04″E
Toopuntul	Hay Shire Council	34°20′54″S 144°06′04″E
Tully	Hay Shire Council	34°19′54″S 145°07′04″E
Twynam	Hay Shire Council	34°37′54″S 144°46′04″E
Ulonga	Hay Shire Council	34°09′54″S 144°40′04″E
Wahwoon	Hay Shire Council	34°32′54″S 145°00′04″E
Wallaby	Hay Shire Council	34°03′54″S 144°54′04″E
Wandigong	Hay Shire Council	34°39′54″S 144°34′04″E
Waradgery	Hay Shire Council	34°24′54″S 143°50′04″E
Warrigal	Hay Shire Council	34°11′54″S 145°03′04″E
Waymea	Hay Shire Council	34°26′54″S 144°28′04″E
West Waradgery	Hay Shire Council	34°29′54″S 144°46′04″E
Wilgah	Hay Shire Council	34°36′54″S 145°05′04″E
Willis	Hay Shire Council	34°43′54″S 144°22′04″E
Wingen	Hay Shire Council	34°40′54″S 144°22′04″E
Wirkenberjal	Hay Shire Council	34°47′54″S 145°00′04″E
Wooloombye	Hay Shire Council	34°12′54″S 144°36′04″E
Wooloondool	Hay Shire Council	34°22′54″S 144°43′04″E
Wyoming	Hay Shire Council	34°07′54″S 144°52′04″E
Yang Yang	Hay Shire Council	34°16′54″S 144°29′04″E
Yimbaring	Hay Shire Council	34°13′54″S 144°15′04″E
