= Wynyard Park =

Wynyard Park may refer to:

- Wynyard Park, County Durham, a stately home in County Durham, England (formerly a seat of the Marquesses of Londonderry)
- Wynyard Park, Sydney, a public park in Sydney
