= Sturt County =

Sturt New South Wales
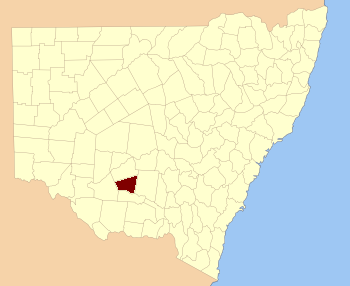
- Location in New South Wales
Lands administrative divisions around Sturt:
Nicholson	Nicholson	Cooper
Waradgery	Sturt	Cooper
Waradgery	Boyd	Boyd

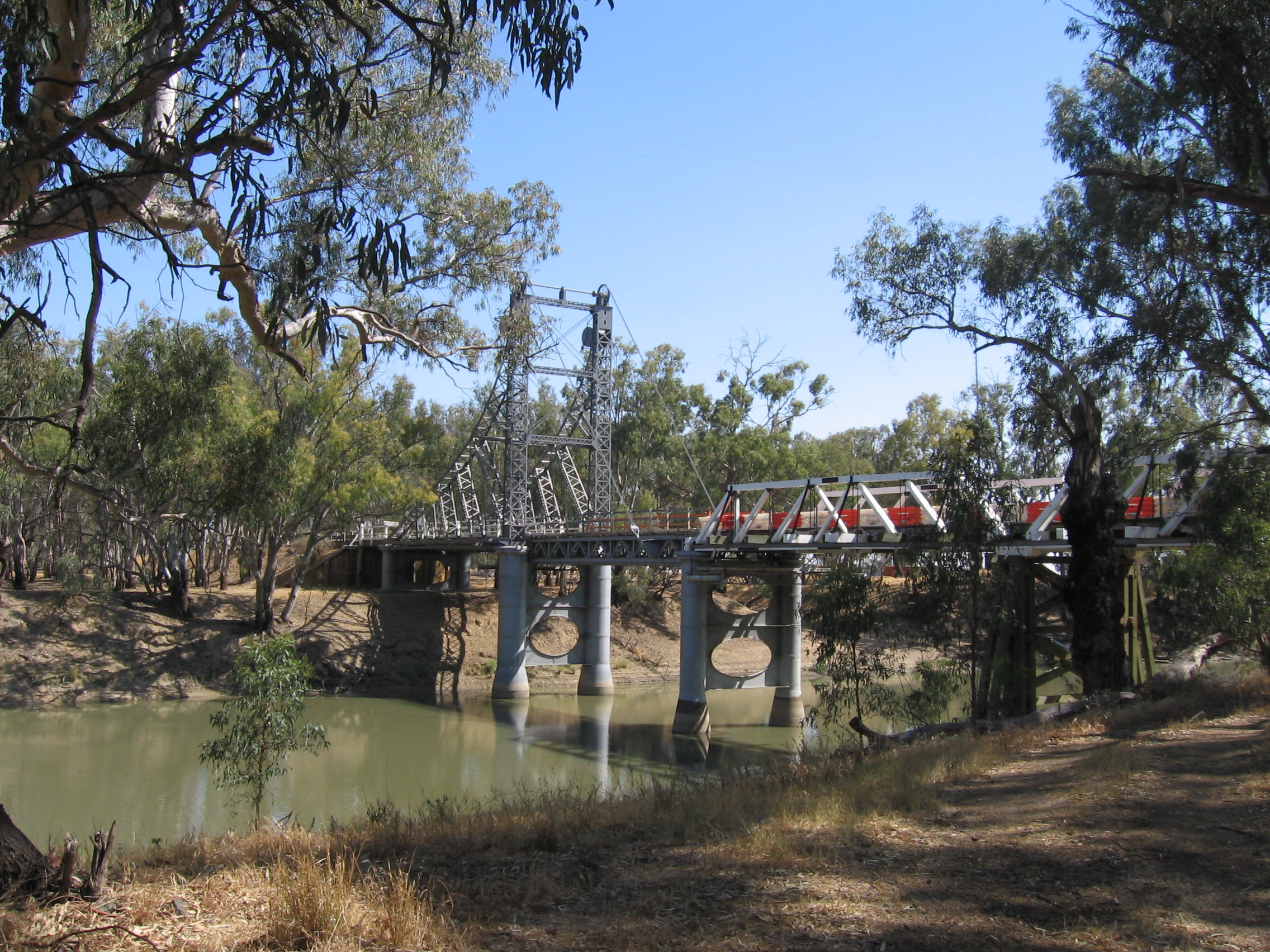
The Carathool Bridge over the Murrumbidgee between Sturt and Boyd

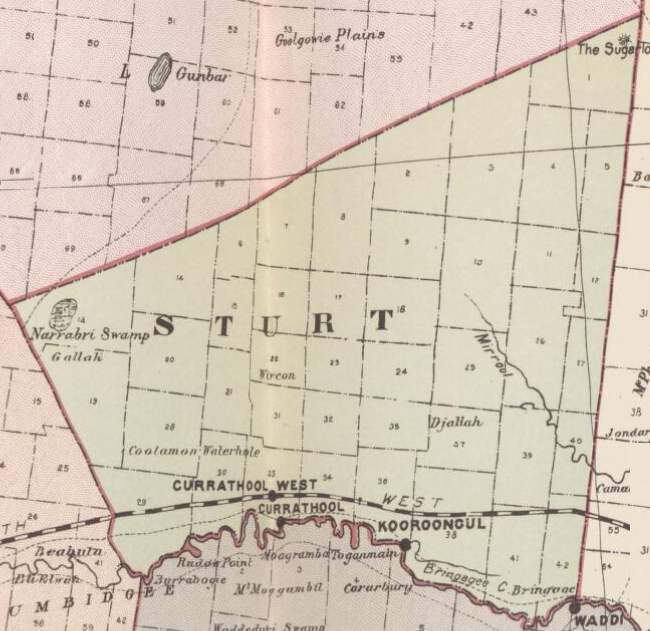
Sturt County NSW as shown on John Sands 1886 map)

Sturt County is one of the 141 cadastral divisions of New South Wales. It contains the locality of Carrathool. The Murrumbidgee River is the southern boundary.

Sturt County was named in honour of the explorer, soldier and public servant Charles Sturt (1795–1869).

== Parishes within this county ==
A full list of parishes found within this county; their current LGA and mapping coordinates to the approximate centre of each location is as follows:

Parish	LGA	Coordinates
Alleyne	Carrathool Shire Council	34°18′54″S 145°28′04″E
Baillie	City of Griffith	34°22′54″S 145°55′04″E
Ballingall	City of Griffith	34°13′54″S 146°00′04″E
Beabula	Hay Shire Council	34°13′54″S 145°11′04″E
Bendigo	City of Griffith	34°21′54″S 145°47′04″E
Benerembah	Carrathool Shire Council	34°28′54″S 145°55′04″E
Bringagee	Carrathool Shire Council	34°25′54″S 145°45′04″E
Buckley	Carrathool Shire Council	34°09′54″S 145°29′04″E
Cajaldura	Carrathool Shire Council	34°23′54″S 145°34′04″E
Carrathool	Carrathool Shire Council	34°22′54″S 145°30′04″E
Carrego	Carrathool Shire Council	34°05′54″S 145°28′04″E
Cockburn	Carrathool Shire Council	34°08′54″S 145°44′04″E
Denny	Carrathool Shire Council	34°02′54″S 145°51′04″E
Djallah	City of Griffith	34°23′54″S 145°51′04″E
Downey	Hay Shire Council	34°11′54″S 145°09′04″E
Ercildoune	Carrathool Shire Council	34°18′54″S 145°35′04″E
Hervey	Carrathool Shire Council	34°10′54″S 145°42′04″E
Houlong	Carrathool Shire Council	34°21′54″S 145°23′04″E
Hyde Park	Carrathool Shire Council	34°18′54″S 145°41′04″E
Kooba	Carrathool Shire Council	34°04′54″S 146°00′04″E
Kooroongal	Carrathool Shire Council	34°23′54″S 145°40′04″E
Learmonth	City of Griffith	34°15′54″S 145°48′04″E
Lethington	Carrathool Shire Council	34°11′54″S 145°26′04″E
Livingstone	Carrathool Shire Council	34°05′54″S 145°37′04″E
Maiden	Carrathool Shire Council	34°02′54″S 145°43′04″E
Mair	Carrathool Shire Council	34°10′54″S 145°37′04″E
Mills	Carrathool Shire Council	34°07′54″S 145°19′04″E
Mirrool	City of Griffith	34°08′54″S 146°02′04″E
Munro	Carrathool Shire Council	34°02′54″S 145°55′04″E
North Bringagee	City of Griffith	34°09′54″S 145°49′04″E
North Uardry	Carrathool Shire Council	34°12′54″S 145°19′04″E
O'Brien	City of Griffith	33°59′54″S 145°53′04″E
Quambatook	Carrathool Shire Council	34°14′54″S 145°36′04″E
Tabbita	Carrathool Shire Council	33°54′54″S 146°02′04″E
Tabbita	Carrathool Shire Council	33°56′54″S 145°57′04″E
Terrapee	Carrathool Shire Council	34°13′54″S 145°31′04″E
Toms Point	Carrathool Shire Council	34°29′54″S 145°14′04″E
Uardry	Carrathool Shire Council	34°20′54″S 145°18′04″E
Warburn	City of Griffith	34°16′54″S 145°53′04″E
Wiveon	Carrathool Shire Council	34°14′54″S 145°42′04″E
Wowong	Carrathool Shire Council	34°28′54″S 145°50′04″E
Wycheproof	Carrathool Shire Council	34°04′54″S 145°32′04″E
Yannaway	Carrathool Shire Council	34°13′54″S 145°25′04″E
