= Mirrool Parish (Sturt County), New South Wales =

Mirrool Parish
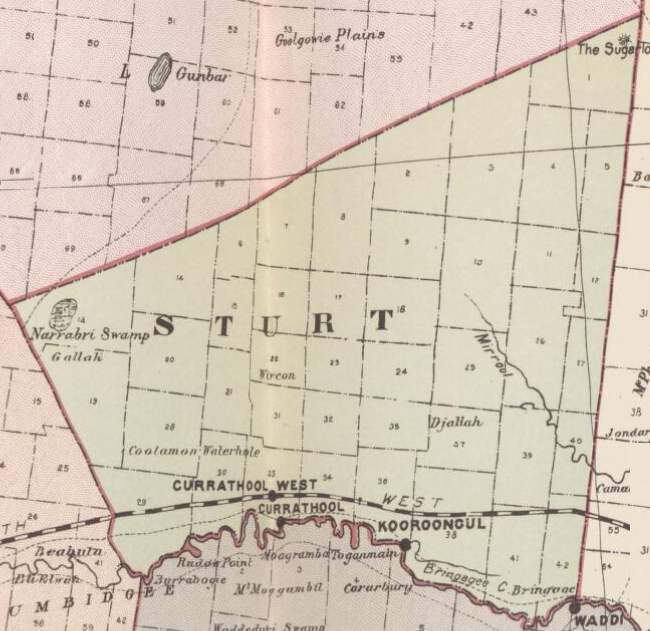
- Sturt County NSW as shown on John Sands 1886 map)

- Coordinates: 34°17′24″S 146°2′24″E
- Country: Australia
- State: New South Wales
- LGA: City of Griffith
- Location: 191 km (119 mi) from Wagga Wagga; 358 km (222 mi) from Canberra; 512 km (318 mi) from Melbourne; 568 km (353 mi) from Sydney; 803 km (499 mi) from Adelaide

Government
  - State electorate: Murray
  - Federal division: Farrer
- Elevation: 129.2 m (424 ft)

Population
  - Total: 25,000–30,000 In Griffith City (2015)
- Time zone: UTC+10 (AEST)
  - Summer (DST): UTC+11 (AEDT)
- Postcode: 2680
- County: Sturt
- Mean max temp: 23.8 °C (74.8 °F)
- Mean min temp: 10.0 °C (50.0 °F)
- Annual rainfall: 397.3 mm (15.64 in)

Mirrool Parish is a civil parish of Sturt County, New South Wales.

The Parish is located at 34°08′54″S and 146°02′04″E just north of the town of Griffith, New South Wales in the Riverina Region.

The township of Mirrool, New South Wales is 80km to the east.

== See also ==
- Mirrool Creek on the south side of Griffith
- Mirrool, New South Wales
