= Sands Directory =

Australian city directories

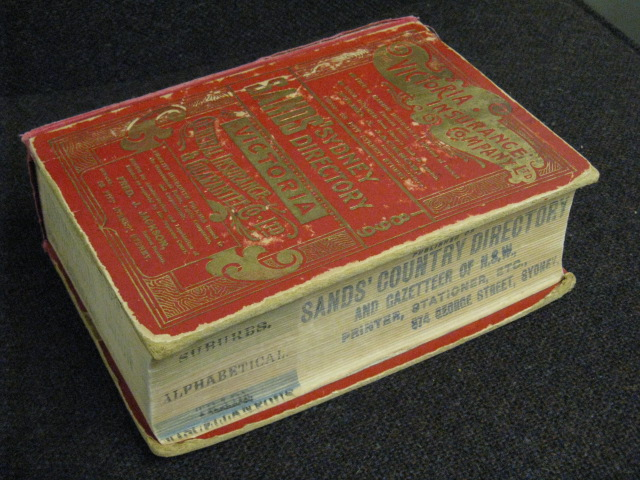
1899 edition of Sands Directory (National Library of Australia)

The Sands Directories, also published as the Sands and Kenny Directory and the Sands and McDougall Directory were annual publications in Australia.

They listed household, business, society, and Government contacts in Melbourne, Adelaide and Sydney including some rural areas of Victoria and New South Wales from the 1850s. City directories are an important resource for historical research, allowing individual addresses and occupations to be linked to specific streets and suburbs.

== Publisher ==
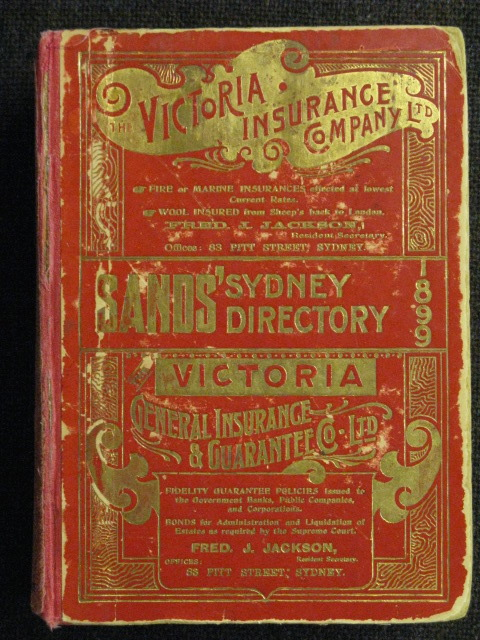
1899 edition of Sands Directory (cover)

John Sands (1818-1873) was an engraver, printer and stationer. Born in England he moved to Sydney in 1837. Sands formed several business partnerships, in 1851 with his brother-in-law Thomas Kenny, and in 1860 with Dugald McDougall with the business being known as Sands, Kenny & Co. Directory titles changed as the publisher changed partners, and at different points the Sands Directories were also published as the 'Sands and Kenny' or 'Sands and McDougall Directories'.

== Sands, Kenny & Co's commercial and general Melbourne directory ==
The first Melbourne Directory was published by Sands and Kenny in 1857. By 1858 the second edition of the directory was distributed to public libraries in the major seaports of Great Britain, Ireland, the United States of America, and Canada. From 1862 to 1974 the Melbourne directories were published as the Sands and McDougall Melbourne Directory.

The 1860 Melbourne directory was 400 pages long and contained over 10,000 entries.

== Sands Sydney, Suburban and Country Commercial Directory ==
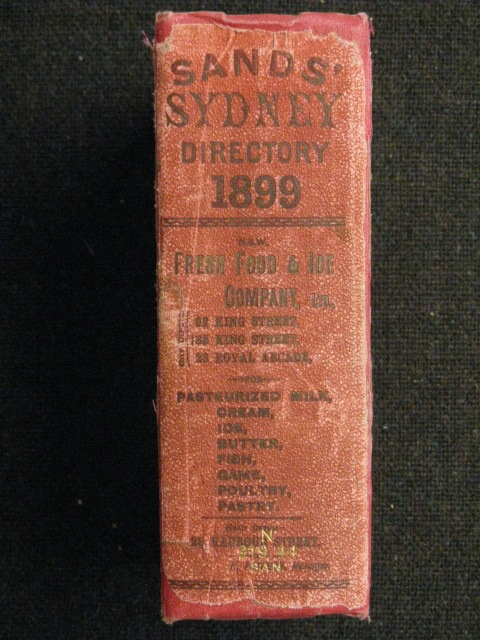
1899 edition of Sands Directory (spine)

The Sands Sydney, Suburban and Country Commercial Directory, first published in 1858, included a variety of information including street addresses and businesses, farms and country towns, stock numbers (e.g. horses, cattle and sheep on each station) as well as information about public watering places including dams, tanks and wells. With the primary function of post office directory it provides lists of householders, businesses, public institutions and officials.

The Sydney editions of the directory, covering the state of New South Wales, were published each year from 1858–59 to 1932–33. There were four years when the directory did not appear during this time, they were 1872, 1874, 1878 and 1881. Other sources have catalogued these publication gap years as being 1860, 1862, 1872, 1878 and 1881, and/or 1874.

The directory is arranged by municipalities in which properties were located, listing the primary householder street by street. As a consequence, the household and business information in the directories is used for research into Sydney history, with particular application for genealogical research.

By 1909 the Sydney directory contained over 1700 pages. The full title of the 1913 edition of the directory of Sydney is Sands Sydney, Suburban and Country Directory for 1913 comprising, amongst other information, street, alphabetical, trade and professional, country towns, country alphabetical, pastoral, educational, governmental, parliamentary, law and miscellaneous lists.

== Sands & McDougall's South Australian directory ==
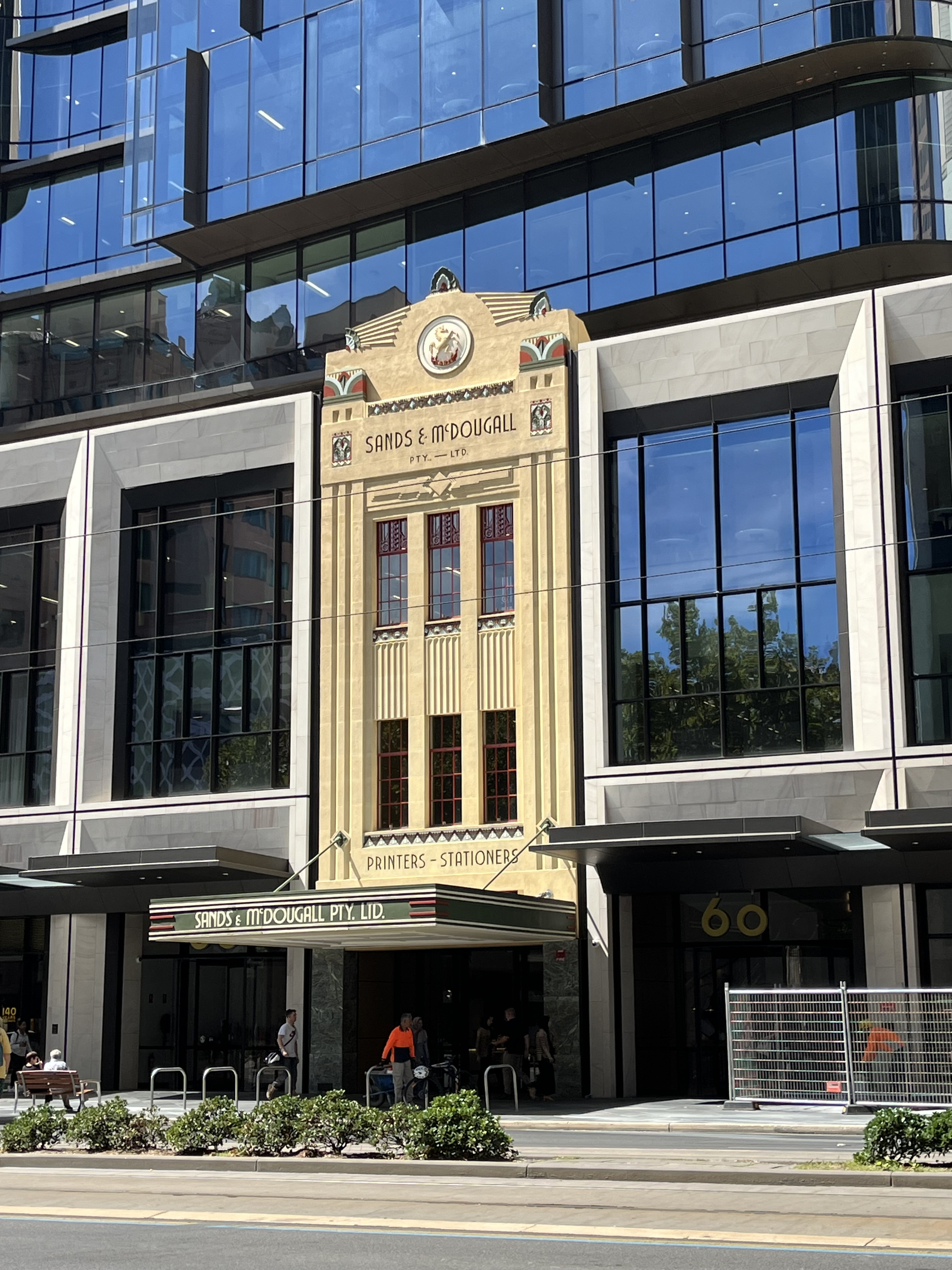
The Art Deco facade of the Sands & McDougall building at 64 King William Street, Adelaide

Sands and McDougall arrived in Adelaide in 1883. They took over the directory previously published by Josiah Boothby, publishing their first South Australian directory in January 1884. The Sands & McDougall's Directory of South Australia was published from 1884 to 1974.

The facade of the Sands & McDougall Printers and Stationers building at 64 King William Street, Adelaide is an excellent early example of Art Deco architecture in South Australia. The facade of the 19th-century neoclassical building was redesigned in 1933, and was listed on the South Australian Heritage Register in December 2020.

== See also ==
- Western Australia Post Office Directory
- New South Wales Post Office Directory
