= Parish of Hervey (Sturt County) =

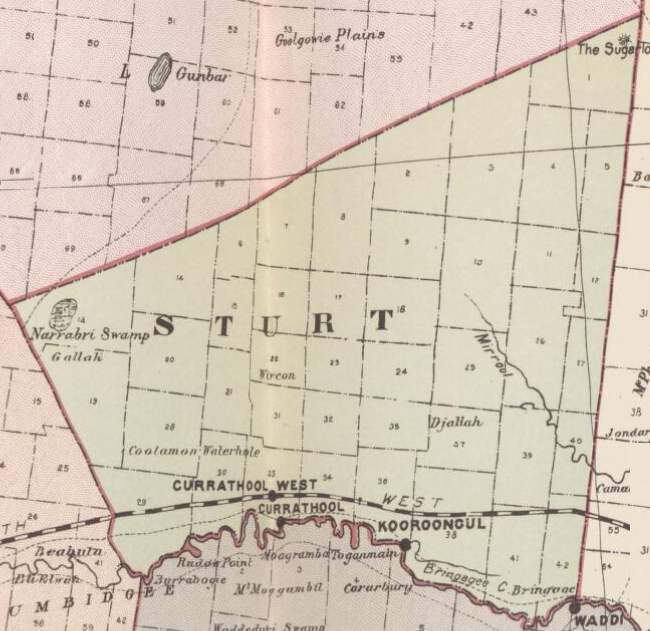
Sturt County NSW as shown on John Sands 1886 map)

Hervey Parish, New South Wales is both a rural locality of Carrathool Shire Council located at 34°10′54″S 145°42′04″E and a civil Parish of Sturt County, New South Wales.
