= John Sands (company) =

Australian printing company

- Founded: 1837; 189 years ago
- Founders: John Sands

John Sands is an Australian printing company and former distributor of games and computer hardware that is now a wholly owned subsidiary of American Greetings.

The business was founded in Sydney, Australia by a 19 year old English immigrant John Sands in 1837. In 1851, John Sands and Thomas Kenny founded Sands and Kenny in Sydney. The firm later became Sands, Kenny & Co., and then John Sands Ltd. Sands began building his publishing and stationery business in George Street, Sydney. On 18 April 1867, a fire broke out at the Reibey Cottage on 394 George Street, which adjoined the John Sands building.

In 1881, John Sands introduced the first Christmas and New Year's Day greeting cards to be produced by an Australian printer. Through the years games, magazines, maps and books were added to the product line.

The John Sands Family relinquished control of the company after 141 years in 1978. Acquired by American Greetings in 1996, John Sands has retained its name and became part of the global company. American Greetings acquired John Sands from Amcor in December 1995 as part of a global expansion.

== Distributor ==
John Sands acted as a distributor for Milton Bradley from the 1960s to the 1990s, releasing board games in Australia including Foxy, The Game of Life, Wonderland, Mix & Match, Stay Alive, Upwords and I Wish I Were. Also as a result of Hasbro acquiring MB in 1984 John Sands took on the Australian distribution of Transformers, G.I. Joe, with the International Heroes branding from Action Force, Jem, My Little Pony, and Glo Friends until Hasbro Australia was established in the 1990s. John Sands also was the Australian importer for Waddingtons.

John Sands Electronics, based at 6 Bay Street Port Melbourne, also distributed Sega computing hardware into the Australian market, including the hardware and software of the Sega SG-1000 game console and SC-3000 computer.

John Sands was also the distributor of Corgi Toys and products of Mettoy in Australia and New Zealand.

It also has stationery products like Platignum Pens.

== Motor racing sponsorship ==
In the early 1980s John Sands sponsored the Melbourne based sports and touring car racing driver Rusty French in the Australian Touring Car and GT Championships and Bathurst 1000, first with a Ford Falcon XD with Platignum branding finishing 22nd at Bathurst in 1981, Porsche 935 with Corgi branding (winning the Australian GT title in 1983) and a Holden Commodore VH with Sega branding finishing in the top 10 at Bathurst in 1983 and 1984.

== See also ==
- Sands Directory
