= Tabbita, New South Wales =

Tabbita
- Town
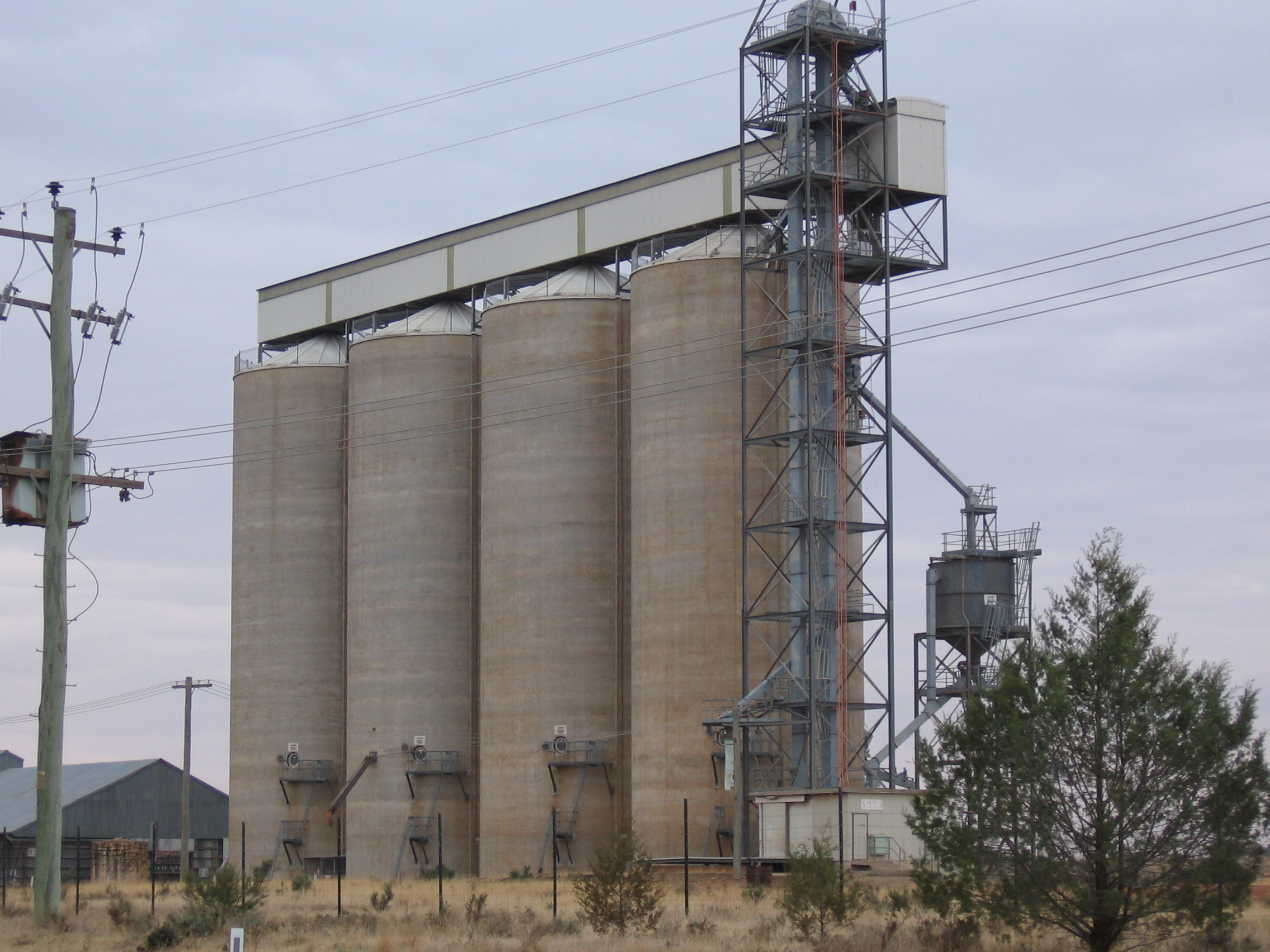
- GrainCorp silos at Tabbita

- Coordinates: 34°06′20″S 145°50′52″E
- Country: Australia
- State: New South Wales
- LGA: Carrathool Shire Council
- Location: 10 km (6.2 mi) from Warburn; 19 km (12 mi) from Goolgowi; 31 km (19 mi) from Griffith

Government
  - Federal division: Farrer
- Elevation: 135 m (443 ft)

Population
  - Total: 76 (SAL 2021)
- Postcode: 2652
- County: Sturt

Tabbita is a village community in the central part of the Riverina. It is situated by road, on the Kidman Way, about 10 kilometres north west of Warburn and 19 kilometres south east of Goolgowi. The Tabbita area is used prominently for agricultural purposes.

== Notable enterprises ==
=== Prime City cattle feedlot ===
Prime City is a feedlot which was originally developed in the mid 1990s by Australian Meat Holdings. The feedlot has since been acquired by JBS, who use the facility to produce grain fed beef for the beef processing plant in Toowoomba. The feedlot was shut down in 2012, affecting 63 employees at the time. However, JBS re-opened the facility in late 2014, influenced by recent feedlot operations expansions at the Yanco facility.

=== GrainCorp ===
GrainCorp formerly operated a grain receival site in Tabbita. It was closed down in 2014, along with more than 60 other sites which were also closed in western New South Wales around the same time.

== Infrastructure ==
=== Post office ===
Tabbita Post Office opened on 1 October 1927 and closed in 1974.

=== Train station ===
The Tabbita train station, situated along the Temora–Roto railway line, was established on 18 June 1923, and closed on 4 May 1975.

=== Telecommunications ===
In 2018, a mobile phone tower providing 3G and 4G wireless service was constructed by Vodafone, from a federal government tender under the Mobile Black Spot Program. Competing carriers Optus and Telstra have since added reception in the area.
