= Waddi, New South Wales =

Waddi
- Town
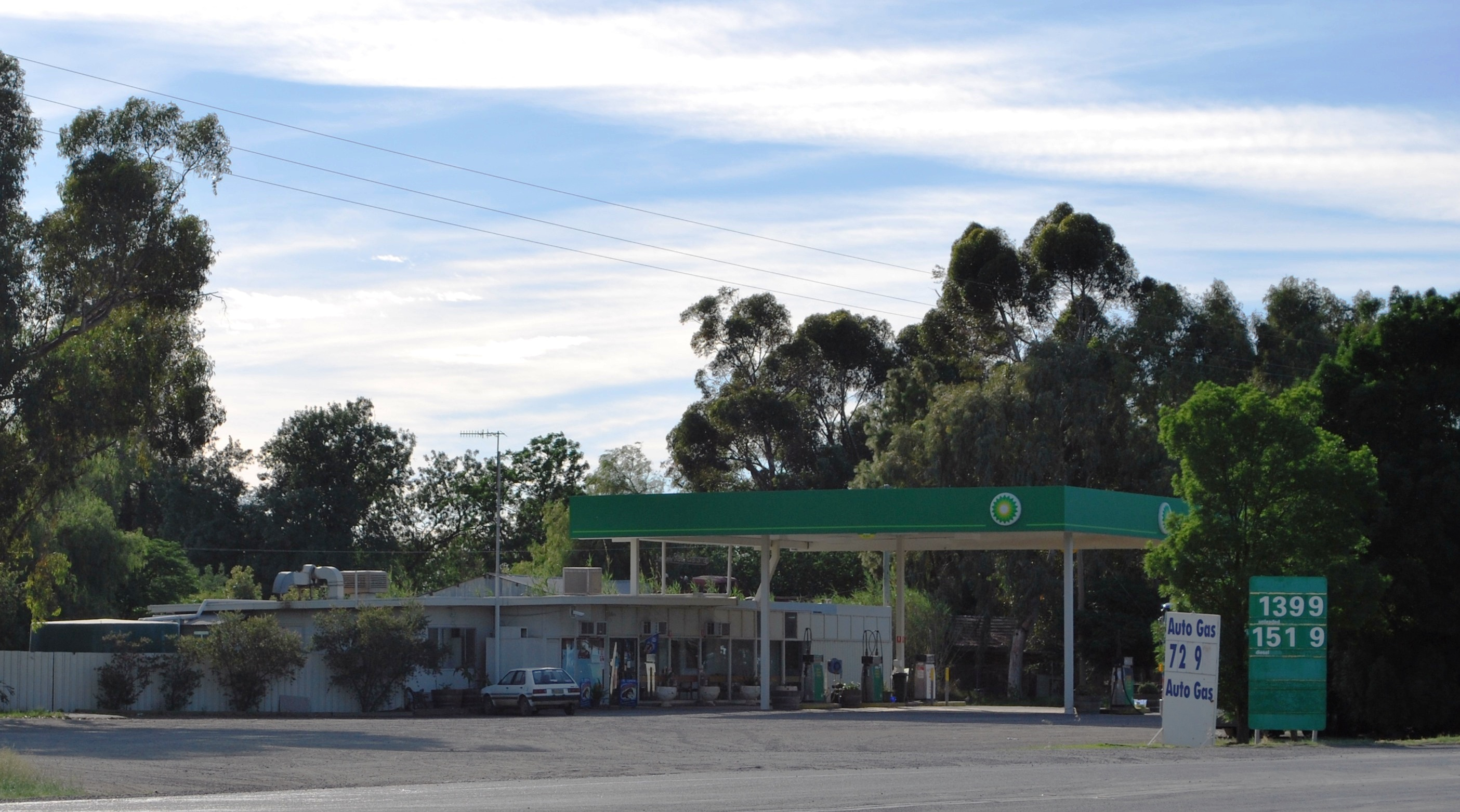
- BP Roadhouse at Waddi

- Coordinates: 34°35′43″S 145°59′36″E
- Country: Australia
- State: New South Wales
- LGA: Murrumbidgee Council
- Location: 2 km (1.2 mi) from Darlington Point; 29 km (18 mi) from Coleambally

Government
  - State electorate: Murray
  - Federal division: Farrer
- Elevation: 126 m (413 ft)
- Postcode: 2706
- County: Boyd

Waddi is a village community in the central part of the Riverina on the Sturt Highway. It is situated by road, about 2 kilometres south from Darlington Point and 29 kilometres north from Coleambally.
