= Warburn, New South Wales =

Warburn
- Town
- Coordinates: 34°10′37″S 145°56′10″E
- Country: Australia
- State: New South Wales
- LGA: City of Griffith
- Location: 10 km (6.2 mi) from Tabbita; 12 km (7.5 mi) from Griffith

Government
  - State electorate: Murray
  - Federal division: Farrer
- Elevation: 112 m (367 ft)

Population
  - Total: 62 (SAL 2021)
- Postcode: 2680
- County: Sturt

Warburn is a small rural community in the central north part of the Riverina. It is situated by road, about 10 kilometres south east of Tabbita and 12 kilometres north west of Griffith.
