= Boyd County, New South Wales =

Boyd New South Wales
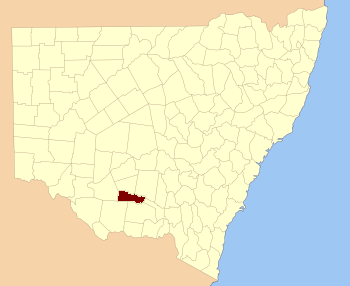
- Location in New South Wales
Lands administrative divisions around Boyd:
Waradgery	Sturt	Cooper
Waradgery	Boyd	Mitchel
Townsend	Urana	Urana

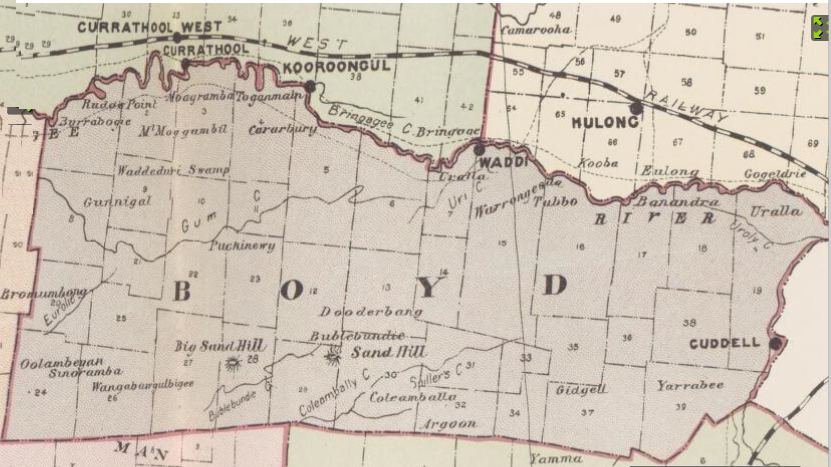
Boyd County NSW as shown on John Sands 1886 map).

Boyd County is one of the 141 cadastral divisions of New South Wales. It contains the locality of Coleambally. The Murrumbidgee River is the northern boundary.

Boyd County was named in honour of Benjamin Boyd, entrepreneur (1796–1851).

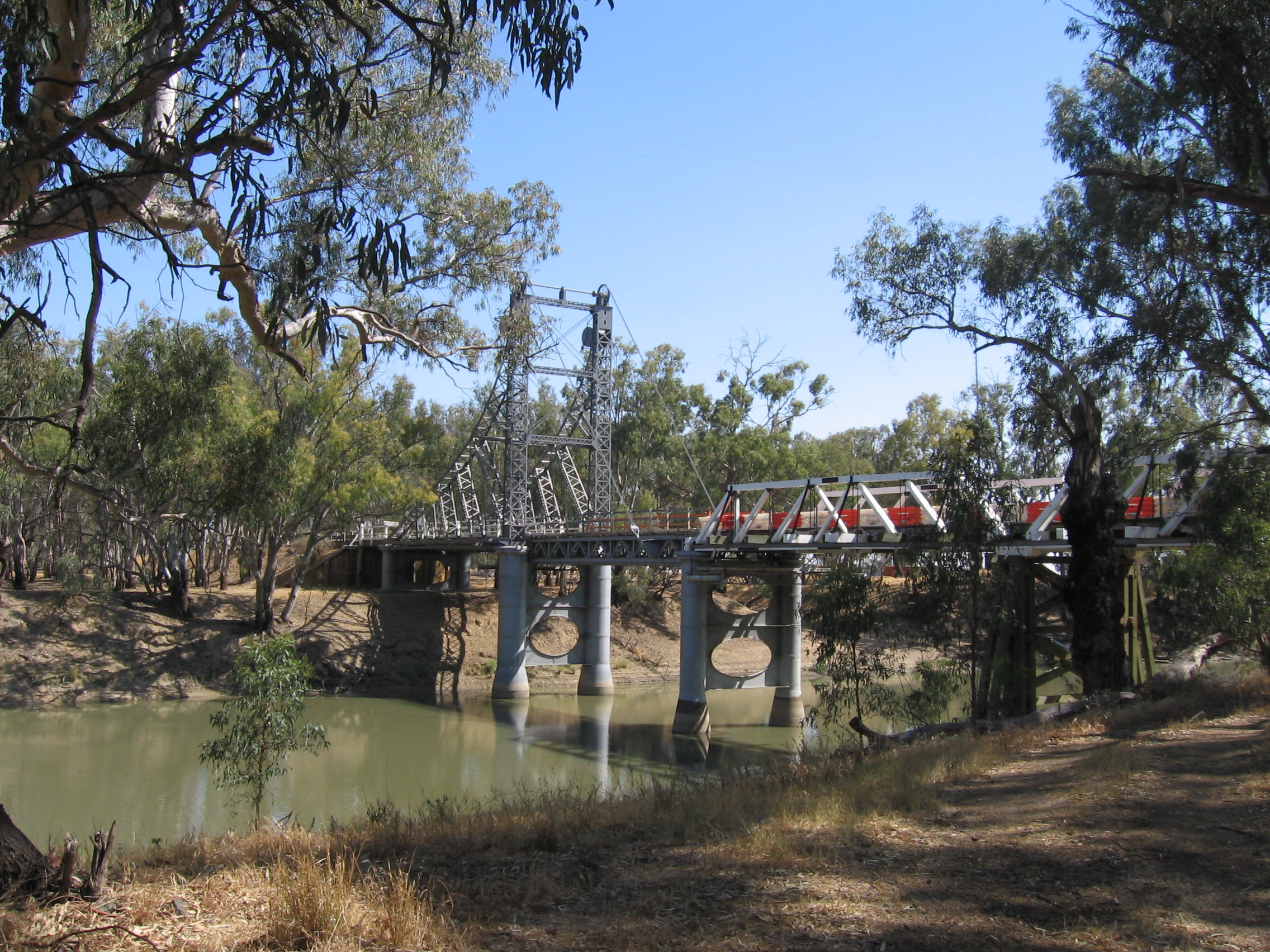
The Carathool Bridge over the Murrumbidgee between Boyd and Sturt

== Parishes within this county ==
A full list of parishes found within this county; their current LGA and mapping coordinates to the approximate centre of each location is as follows:

Parish	LGA	Coordinates
Argoon	Murrumbidgee Council	34°50′54″S 145°54′04″E
Banandra	Murrumbidgee Council	34°45′54″S 146°10′04″E
Boona	Murrumbidgee Council	34°46′54″S 145°58′04″E
Boyd	Murrumbidgee Council	34°47′54″S 145°22′04″E
Burt	Leeton Shire Council	34°39′54″S 146°16′04″E
Cararbury	Murrumbidgee Council	34°36′54″S 145°48′04″E
Clifford	Murrumbidgee Council	34°40′54″S 145°40′04″E
Coleambally	Murrumbidgee Council	34°47′54″S 145°47′04″E
Dow	Murrumbidgee Council	34°39′54″S 145°35′04″E
Duderbang	Murrumbidgee Council	34°41′54″S 145°47′04″E
Eilginbah	Murrumbidgee Council	34°33′54″S 145°25′04″E
Eulo	Murrumbidgee Council	34°45′54″S 146°04′04″E
Eunanbrennan	Murrumbidgee Council	34°31′54″S 145°40′04″E
Gidgell	Murrumbidgee Council	34°51′54″S 146°05′04″E
Glengalla	Murrumbidgee Council	34°44′54″S 145°23′04″E
Gumblebogie	Murrumbidgee Council	34°47′54″S 145°33′04″E
Gundadaline	Murrumbidgee Council	34°40′54″S 145°31′04″E
Howell	Narrandera Shire Council	34°49′54″S 146°13′04″E
Jurambula	Murrumbidgee Council	34°39′54″S 146°10′04″E
Kabarabarabejal	Murrumbidgee Council	34°47′54″S 145°16′04″E
Macleay	Murrumbidgee Council	34°38′54″S 145°24′04″E
Maley	Murrumbidgee Council	34°47′54″S 145°40′04″E
Mulberrygong	Murrumbidgee Council	34°31′54″S 145°18′04″E
Mulburruga	Murrumbidgee Council	34°28′54″S 145°25′04″E
Mycotha	Murrumbidgee Council	34°45′54″S 145°54′04″E
Oolambeyan	Murrumbidgee Council	34°41′54″S 145°16′04″E
Ourendumbee	Narrandera Shire Council	34°44′54″S 146°16′04″E
Peter	Murrumbidgee Council	34°49′54″S 145°48′04″E
Puckinevvy	Murrumbidgee Council	34°35′54″S 145°32′04″E
Singorambah	Murrumbidgee Council	34°29′54″S 145°37′04″E
Toganmain	Murrumbidgee Council	34°28′54″S 145°31′04″E
Tubbo	Murrumbidgee Council	34°39′54″S 146°05′04″E
Ugobit	Murrumbidgee Council	34°41′54″S 145°53′04″E
Uri	Murrumbidgee Council	34°36′54″S 145°54′04″E
Uroly	Leeton Shire Council	34°41′54″S 146°20′04″E
Waddaduri	Murrumbidgee Council	34°34′54″S 145°36′04″E
Waddi	Murrumbidgee Council	34°40′54″S 145°58′04″E
Wangabawgul	Murrumbidgee Council	34°46′54″S 145°29′04″E
Wolseley	Murrumbidgee Council	34°36′54″S 145°18′04″E
