= Robert Wynyard =

British politician

Major-General Robert Wynyard CB
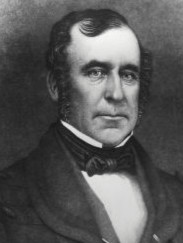
- Born: 24 December 1802; Windsor Castle, Berkshire, England / London
- Died: 6 January 1864 (aged 61); Bath, Somerset, England
- Burial place: Kensal Green Cemetery, London
- Spouse: Anne Catherine McDonnell (m. 12 August 1826–)
- Relatives: William Wynyard (father); Edward Wynyard (brother)
- Military career
- Allegiance: United Kingdom
- Branch: (United Kingdom of Great Britain and Ireland) British Army
- Service years: 1819–1864
- Rank: Major-General
- Units: 85th Regiment (Bucks Volunteers), 1819– 58th (Rutlandshire) Regiment, 1826– 98th (Prince of Wales's) Regiment, 1863–1864
- Commands: New Zealand, 1851–1858
- Campaigns: New Zealand Wars; Flagstaff War; Ruapekapeka, 1846
- Awards: Companion of the Military Order of the Bath, 1846

Major-General Robert Henry Wynyard CB (24 December 1802 – 6 January 1864) was a British Army officer and New Zealand colonial administrator, serving at various times as Lieutenant Governor of New Ulster Province, Administrator of the Government, and was the first Superintendent of Auckland Province.

== Early life ==
Robert was born in Windsor Castle to William Wynyard, Colonel of the 5th Regiment of Foot and Equerry to King George III. He was educated in Dunmow, Essex.

== Career ==
Wynyard obtained a commission in the British Army, without purchase, as an ensign of the 85th Regiment of Foot (Bucks Volunteers), aka The King's Light Infantry Regiment, on 25 February 1819. Stationed with the 85th Regiment in Malta, between June 1821–June 1826, now unattached and on leave of absence subsequent to his appointment to the 58th (Rutlandshire) Regiment of Foot, he married Miss Anne McDonnell (1805–1881) at Malta on 12 August 1826. They were to have four sons.

He served in Ireland to 1841 on the staff of the adjutant general, and was promoted to rank of major in 1841. A son, George Henry Wynyard, had been born at Armagh on 3 October 1827. Wynyard returned to England in 1842 and was appointed to the rank of lieutenant colonel in command of the 58th Regiment.

=== New Zealand ===
When the regiment was posted to Sydney, New South Wales, Australia, in 1844, Wynyard was sent on to New Zealand with 200 men to take part in the Flagstaff War against Hōne Heke and Kawiti. Wynyard was present at the siege of Ruapekapeka on 11 January 1846 and in recognition of services Queen Victoria appointed him to be a Companion of the Most Honourable Military Order of the Bath on 2 July 1846. In December 1846 Wynyards returned to New South Wales, then, after an absence of some seven months, returned with the 58th Regiment to Auckland, New Zealand, in July 1847. He was promoted to the rank of colonel in 1854. Somewhere along the line he had a sexual relationship with a Maori woman that produced a male child.

When a fire broke out in Auckland, New Zealand, in 1858, eventually destroying an entire city block, Wynyard was personally on the scene directing the men of the 58th Regiment in firefighting efforts.

==== Lieutenant-Governor of New Ulster ====
From 26 April 1851 to 7 March 1853, Wynyard was Lieutenant-Governor of New Ulster, a province of New Zealand encompassing much of the North Island. He replaced George Dean Pitt, who had died in office. During his term of office, he persuaded the local chiefs Ngāti Tamaterā and Ngāti Raupunga to allow gold mining in the province. The office was abolished when New Zealand was divided into several smaller provinces under the New Zealand Constitution Act 1852.

==== Superintendent of Auckland Province ====
Wynyard elected Superintendent of the new Auckland Province on 12 July 1853, beating William Brown. He held the office until he resigned on 5 January 1855. Wynyard's election to the office was controversial, as he was in charge of the colonial armed forces at the time, and effectively deputy to the Governor. The Colonial Office, on learning that Wynyard had been elected to the office of superintendent, demanded he resign from the role, which he soon did. He was replaced in the role by his previous electoral opponent William Brown.

==== Administrator of Government ====
Wynyard served for two periods (3 January 1854 to 6 September 1855 and 3 October 1861 to December 1861) as Administrator of the Government, in each case between the recall of one Governor and the arrival of the next.

Wynyard opened the 1st New Zealand Parliament on 24 May 1854. He was quickly confronted by the demands of the new Parliament that responsible government be granted immediately; on 2 June the House of Representatives passed a resolution, sponsored by Edward Gibbon Wakefield, to that effect. Wynyard refused, stating that the Colonial Office made no mention of responsible government in its dispatches. The appointed Executive Council advised Wynyard against implementing responsible government, and in the meantime, he sent a dispatch to London requesting clarification. Wynyard then offered to add some elected members of parliament to the Executive Council, and appointed James FitzGerald, Henry Sewell and Frederick Weld to the council. The compromise worked for a few weeks, but on 1 August Parliament demanded complete power to appoint ministers. Wynyard refused, and all three MPs resigned from the council. In response, Wynyard prorogued Parliament for two weeks. On 31 August he appointed Thomas Forsaith, Jerningham Wakefield and James Macandrew to the Executive Council, but when Parliament met again it moved a motion of no confidence in the members.

Parliament met on 8 August 1855, by which time Wynyard had received instructions from the Colonial Office to introduce responsible government. The new Governor, Sir Thomas Gore Browne, arrived on 6 September 1855 and relieved Wynyard of his duties. He resumed his military career and belonged to the 58th Regiment. On 28 January 1858, Wynyard was appointed to the New Zealand Legislative Council. He resigned on 3 November of that year, as the 58th Regiment was recalled to England.

Wynyard's second term as Administrator in 1861 was much less eventful. Filling in between Gore Browne and Sir George Grey, he governed New Zealand for a short period with the advice of responsible Ministers, under Premier William Fox.

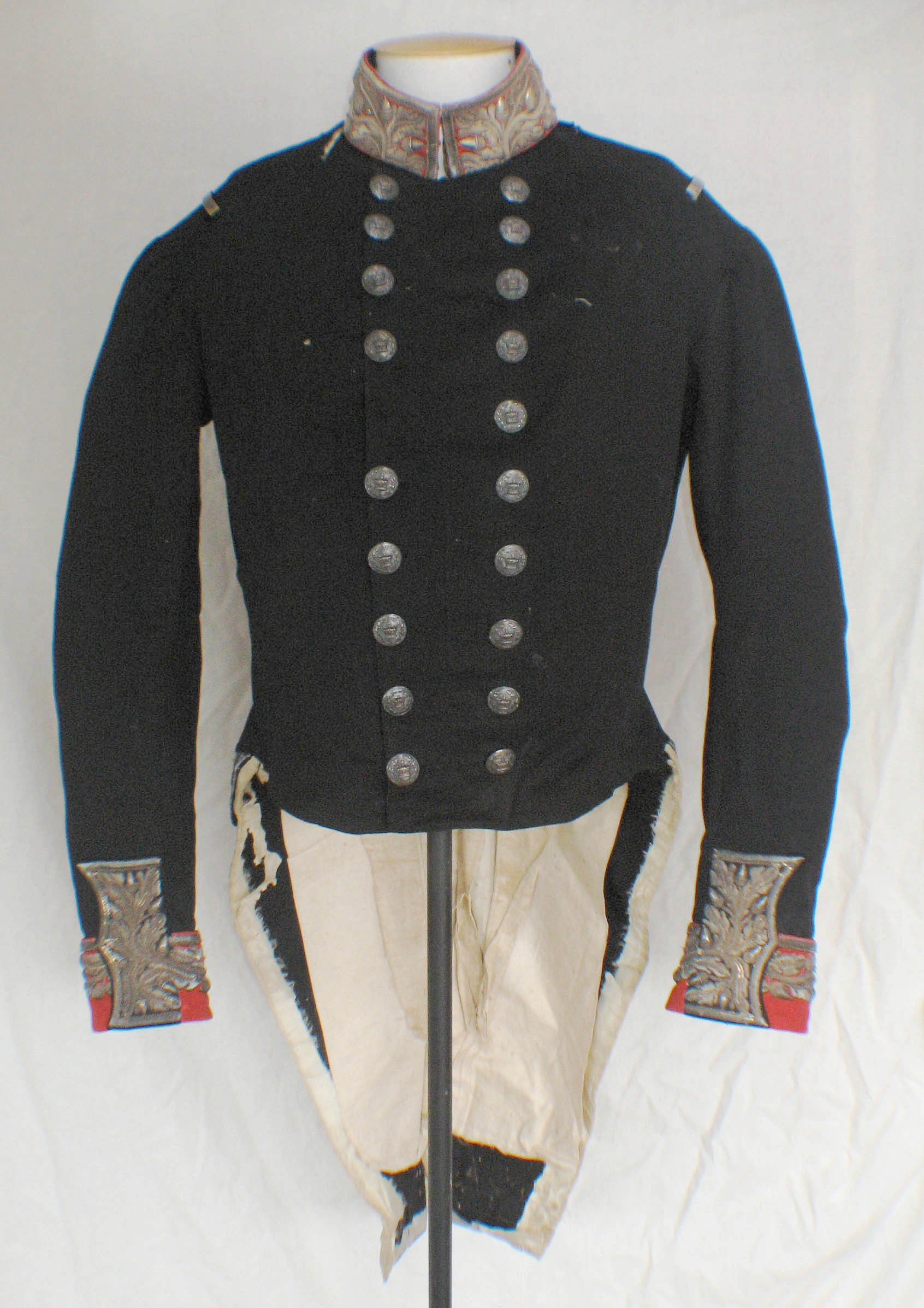
Civil Uniform coatee worn by Lt Col Robert Wynyard, c. 1850s.
Auckland Museum

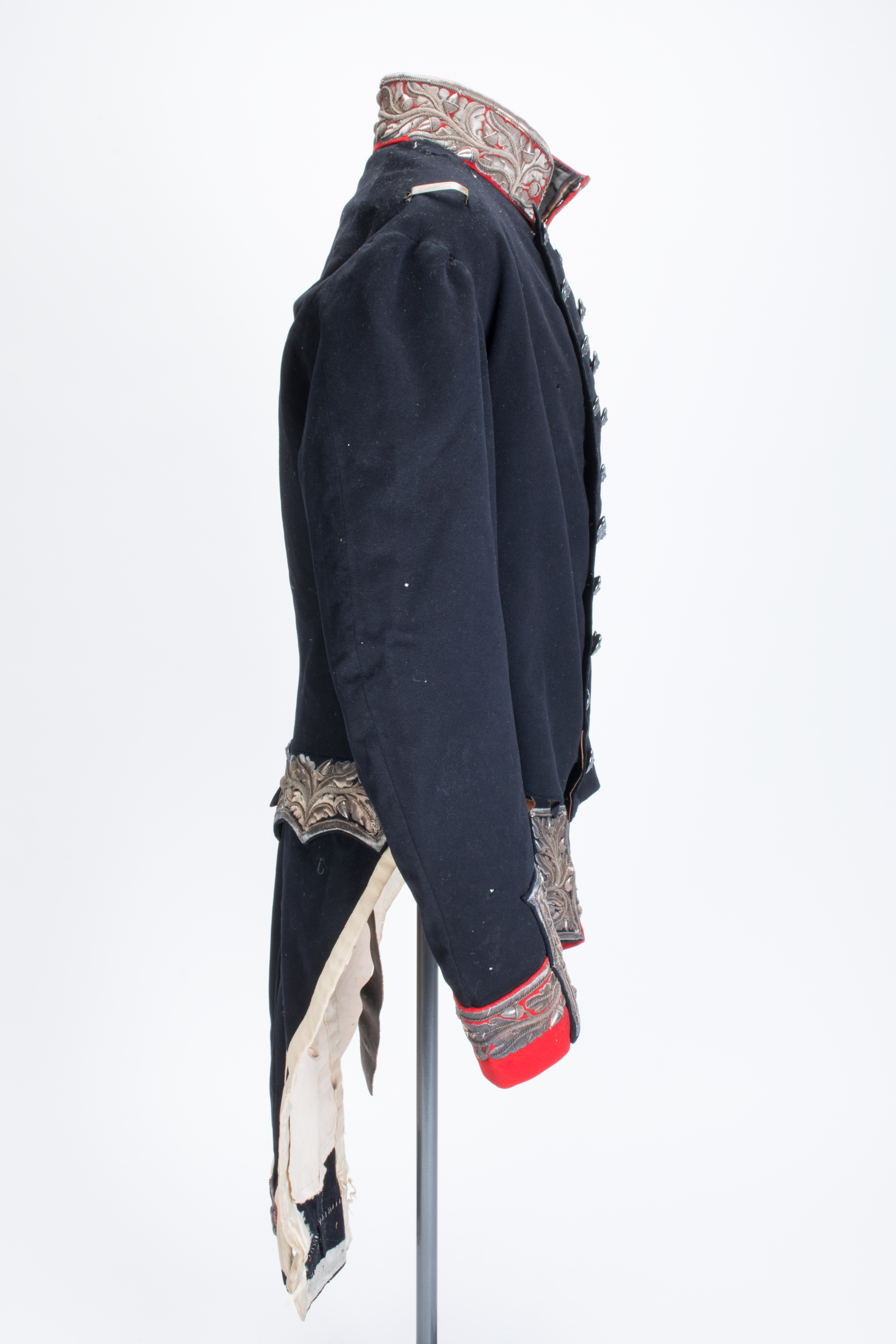
Auckland Museum

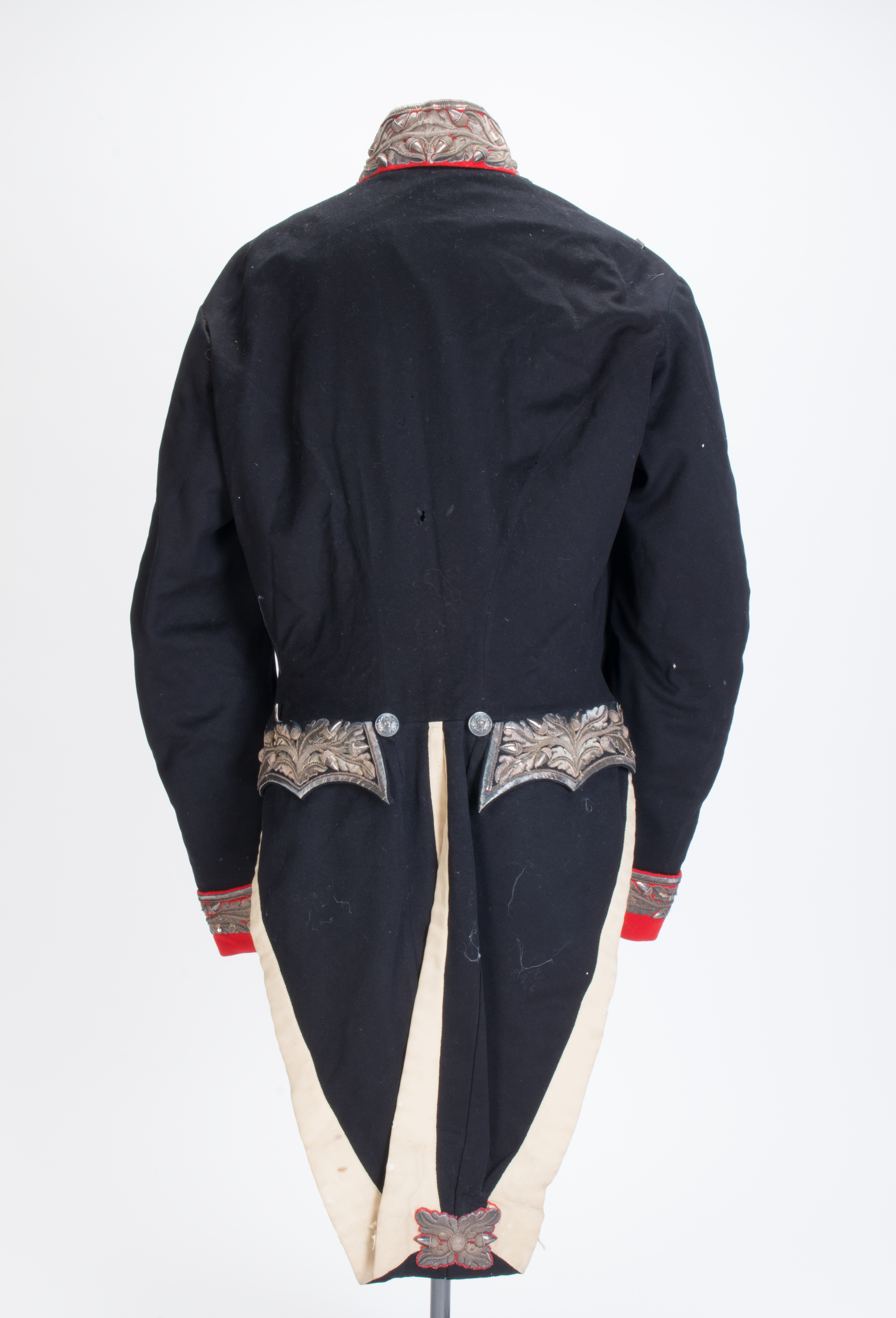
Auckland Museum

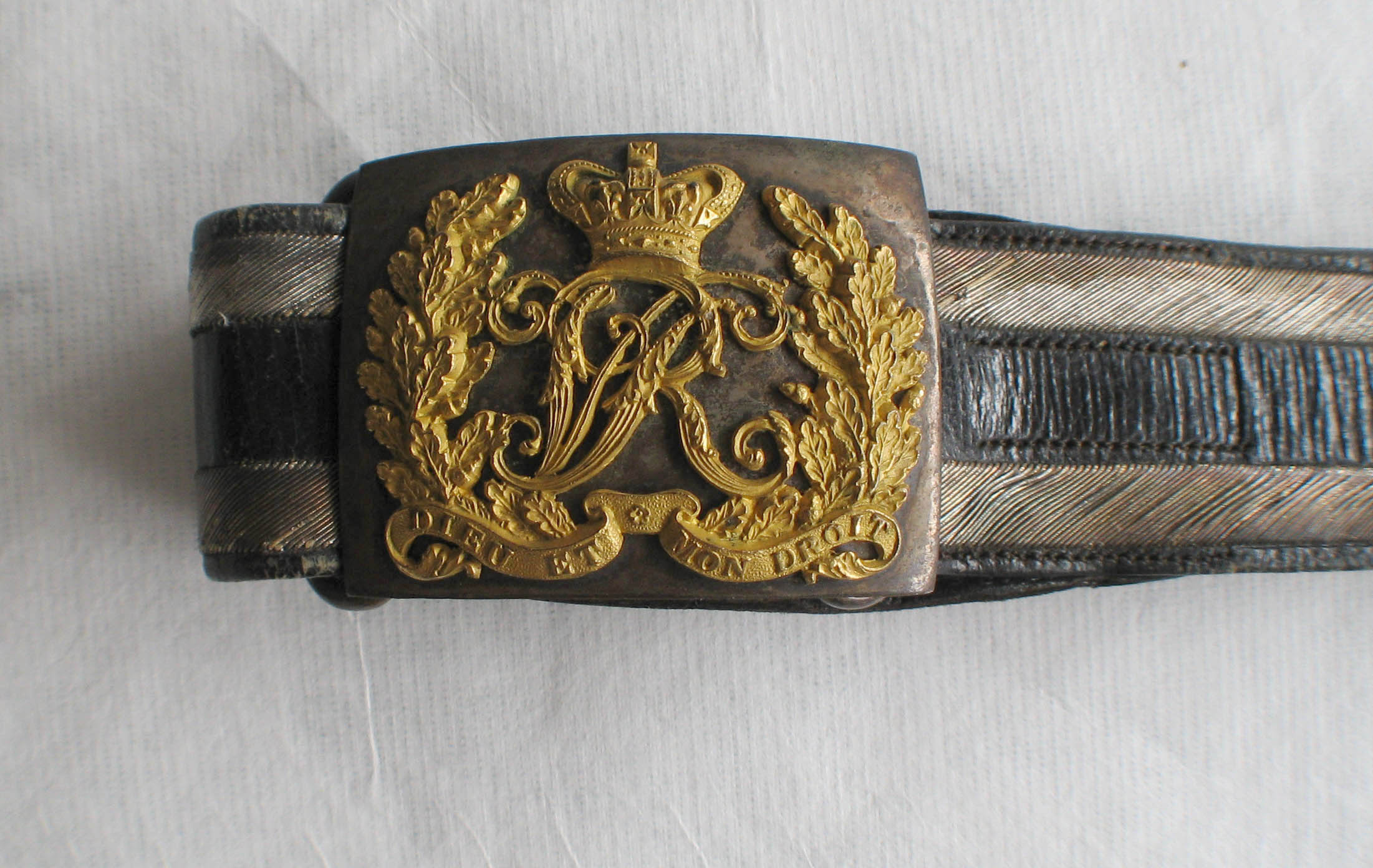
Belt worn by Lt Col Robert Wynyard.
Auckland Museum

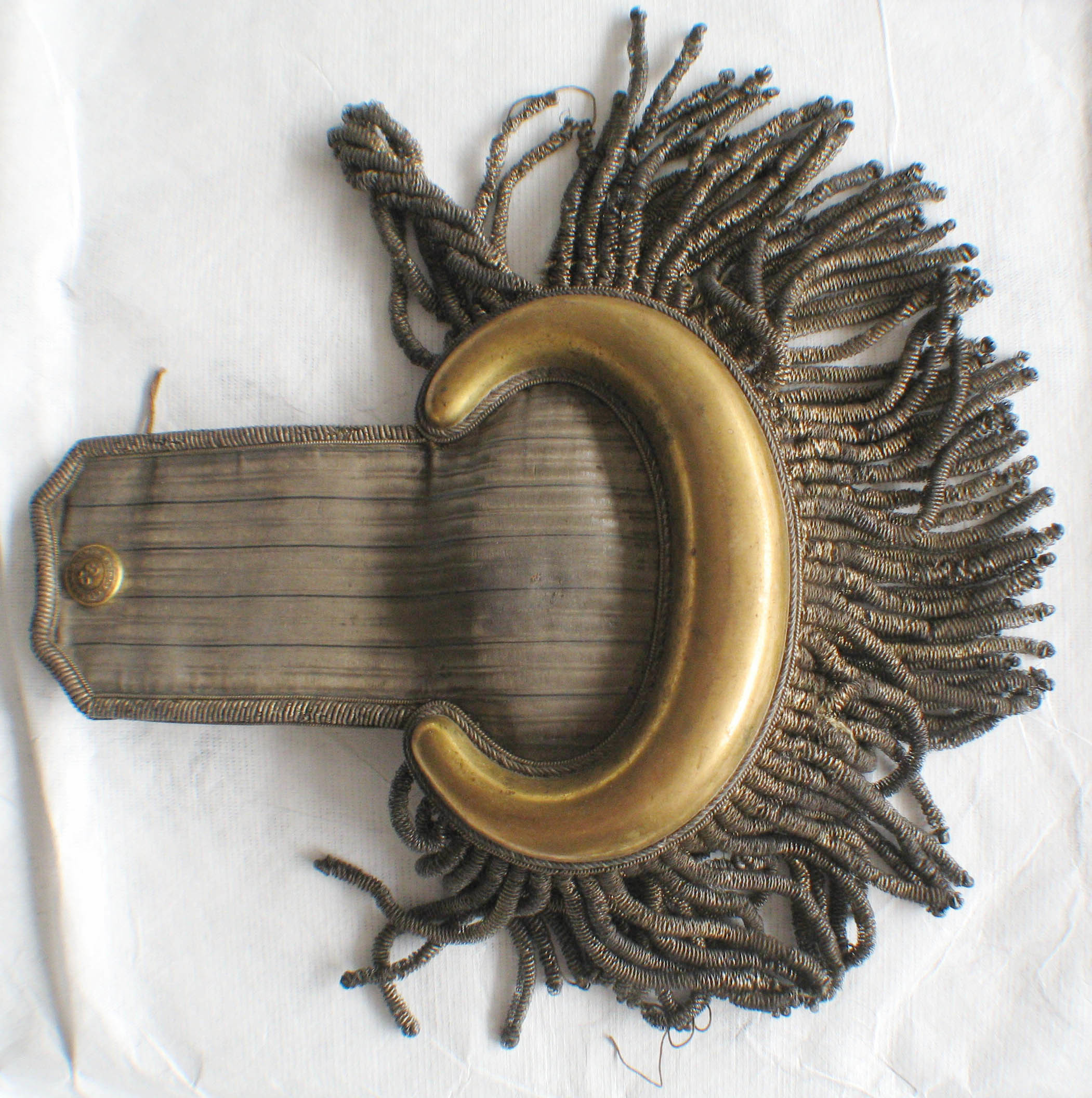
Epaulette.
Auckland Museum

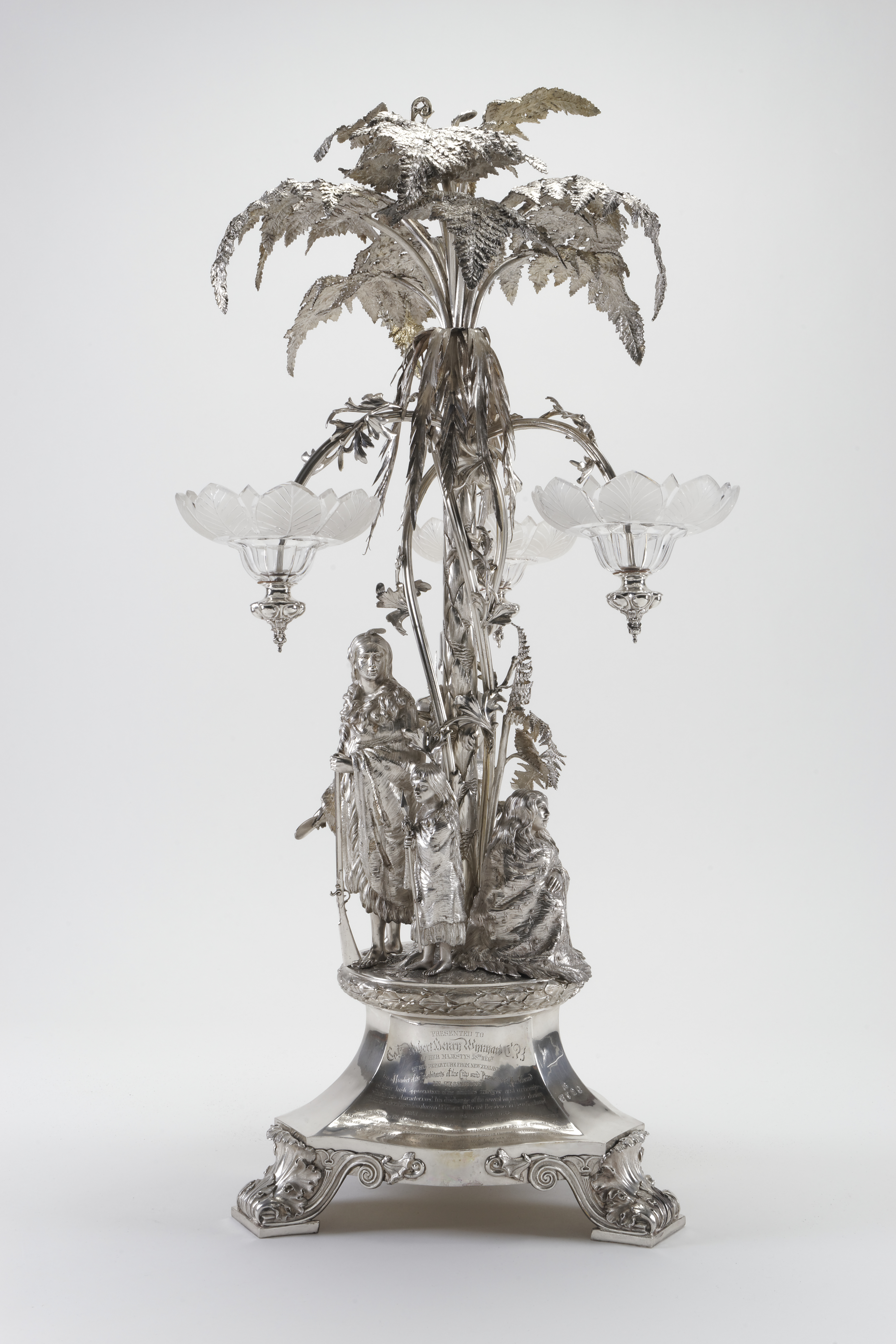
Epergne: Wynyard Testimonial, 1858. Maker: Smith & Nicholson, London.
Auckland Museum

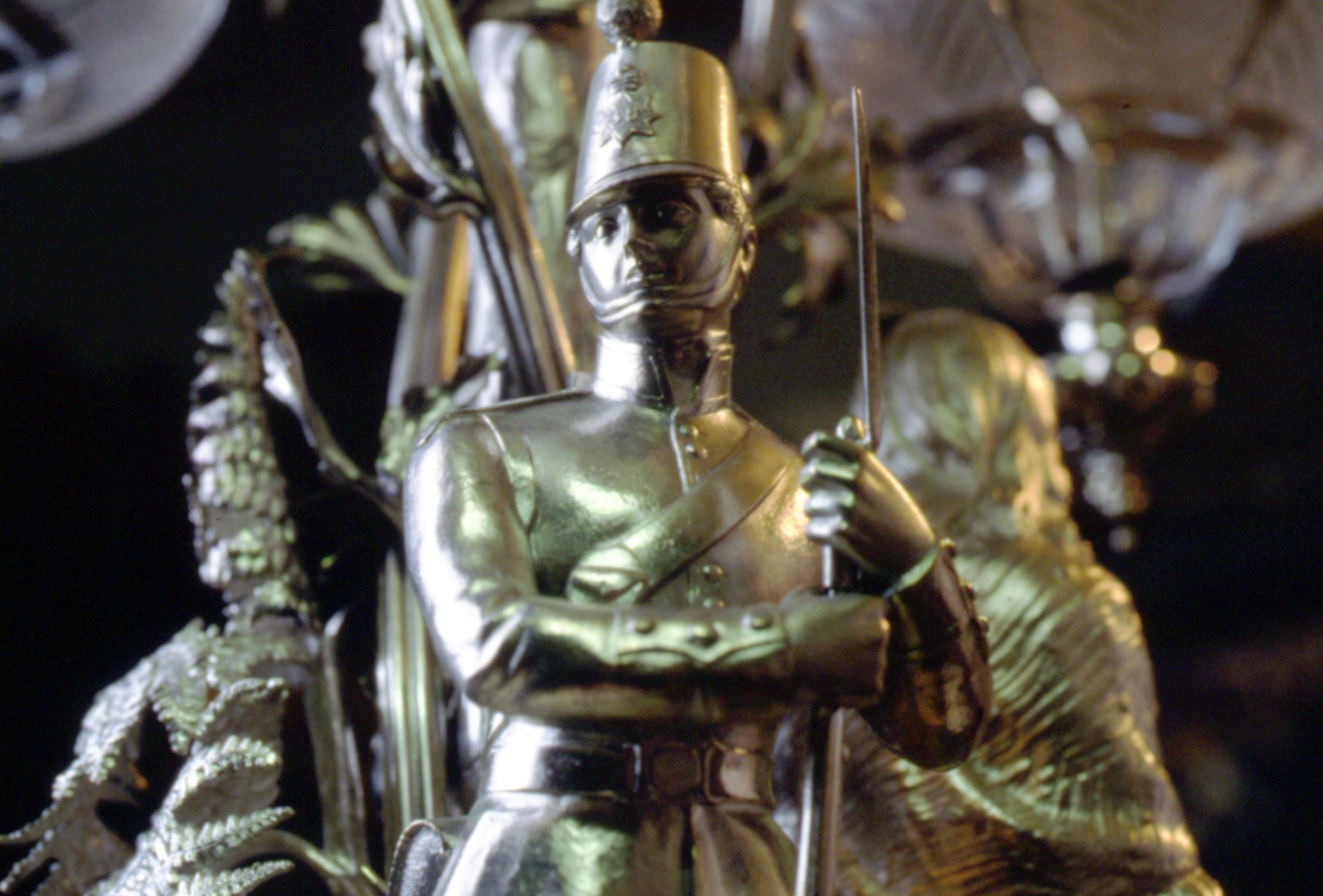
Epergne: Wynyard Testimonial, 1858. Maker: Smith & Nicholson, London.
Auckland Museum

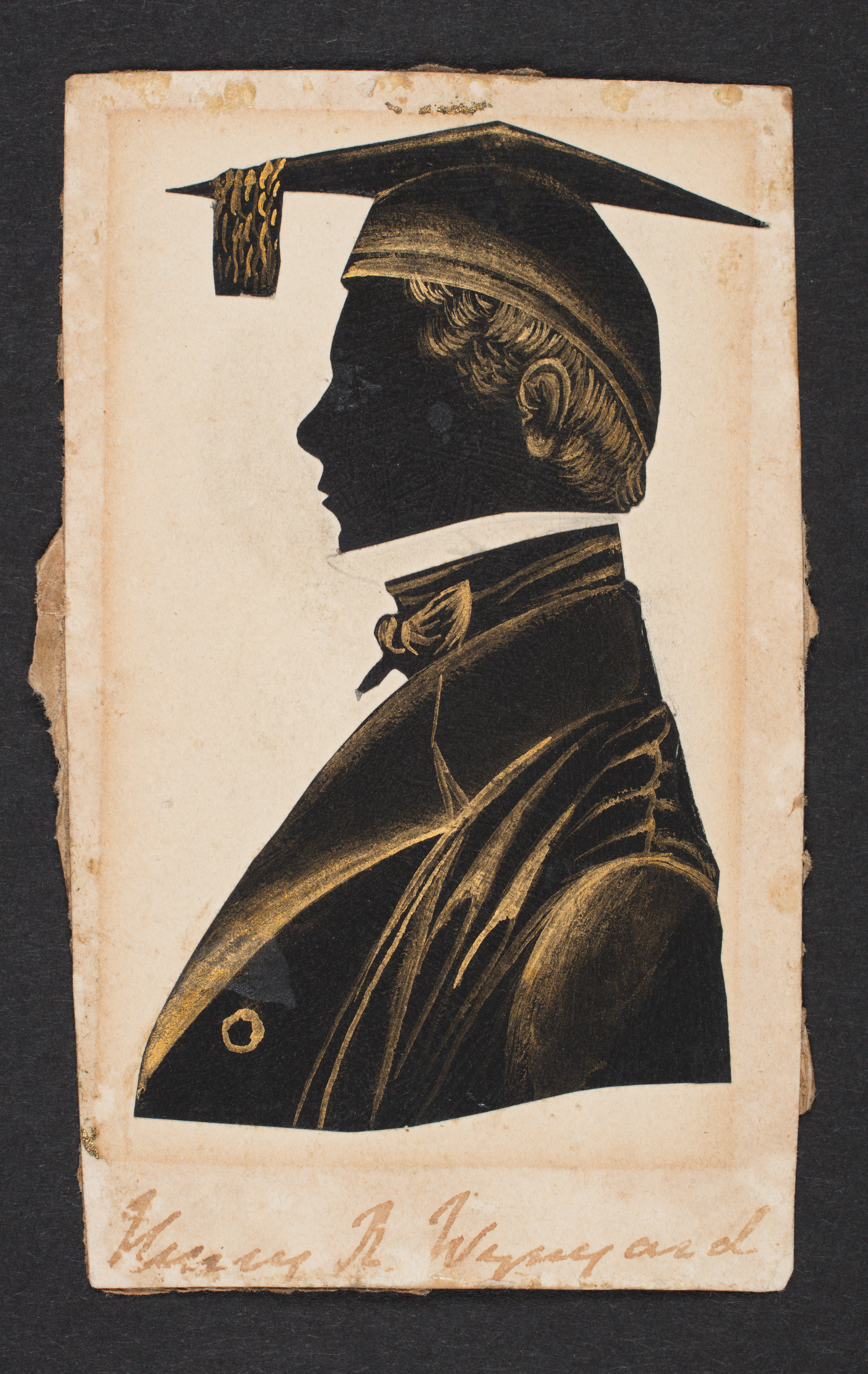
Silhouette portrait of Robert Wynyard

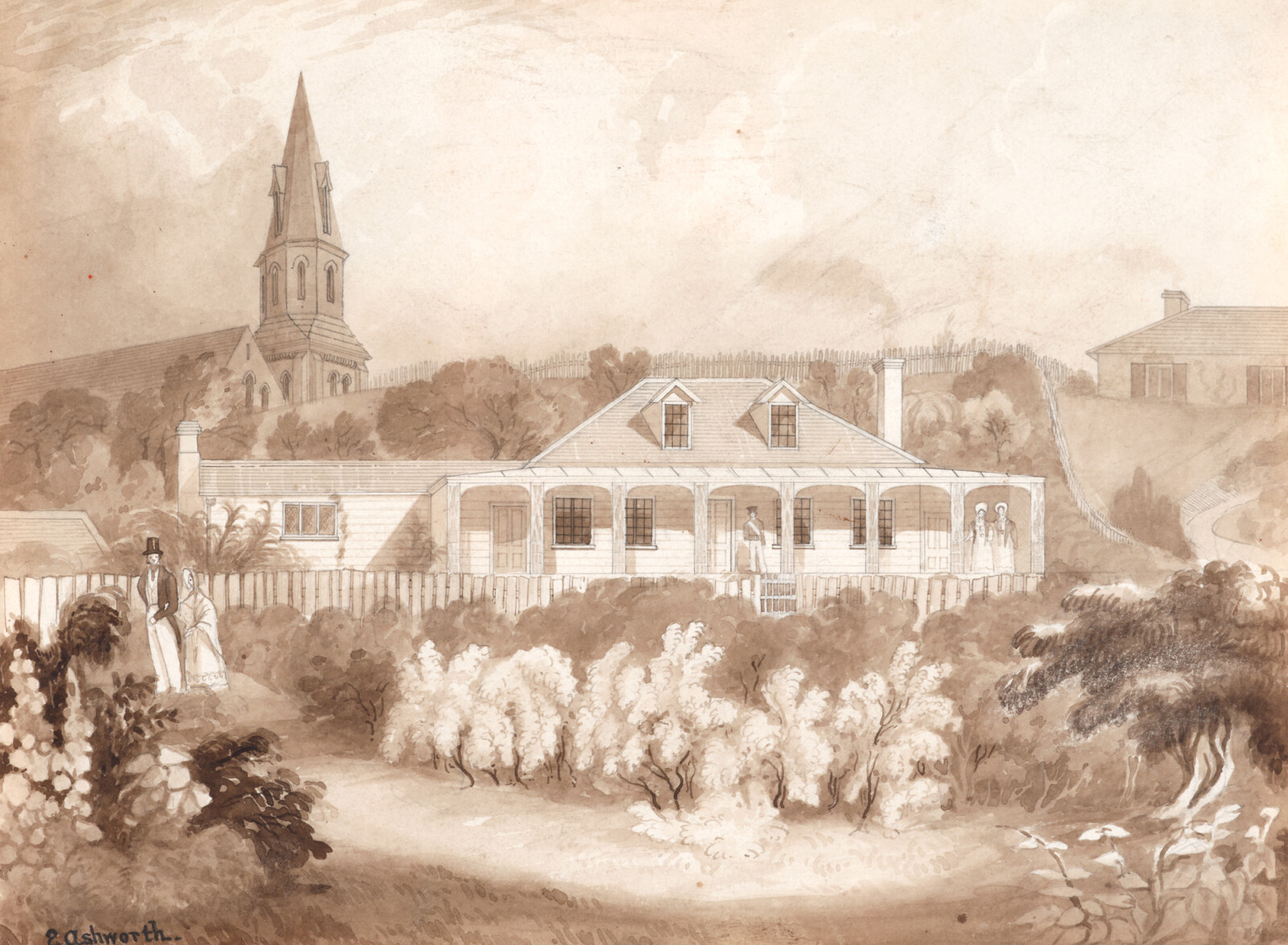
The Residence of Colonel Robert Henry Wynyard, Emily Place, Official Bay, Auckland (c. 1843) by Edward Ashworth

=== Cape Colony ===
He acted for Sir George Grey as Governor of Cape Colony twice, from 1859 to 1860 and from 1861 to 1862.

== Later life ==
Wynyard served as Colonel of the 98th Regiment of Foot from 1863 until his death at Bath, Somerset, England, on 6 January 1864.

== Paintings by Wynyard ==
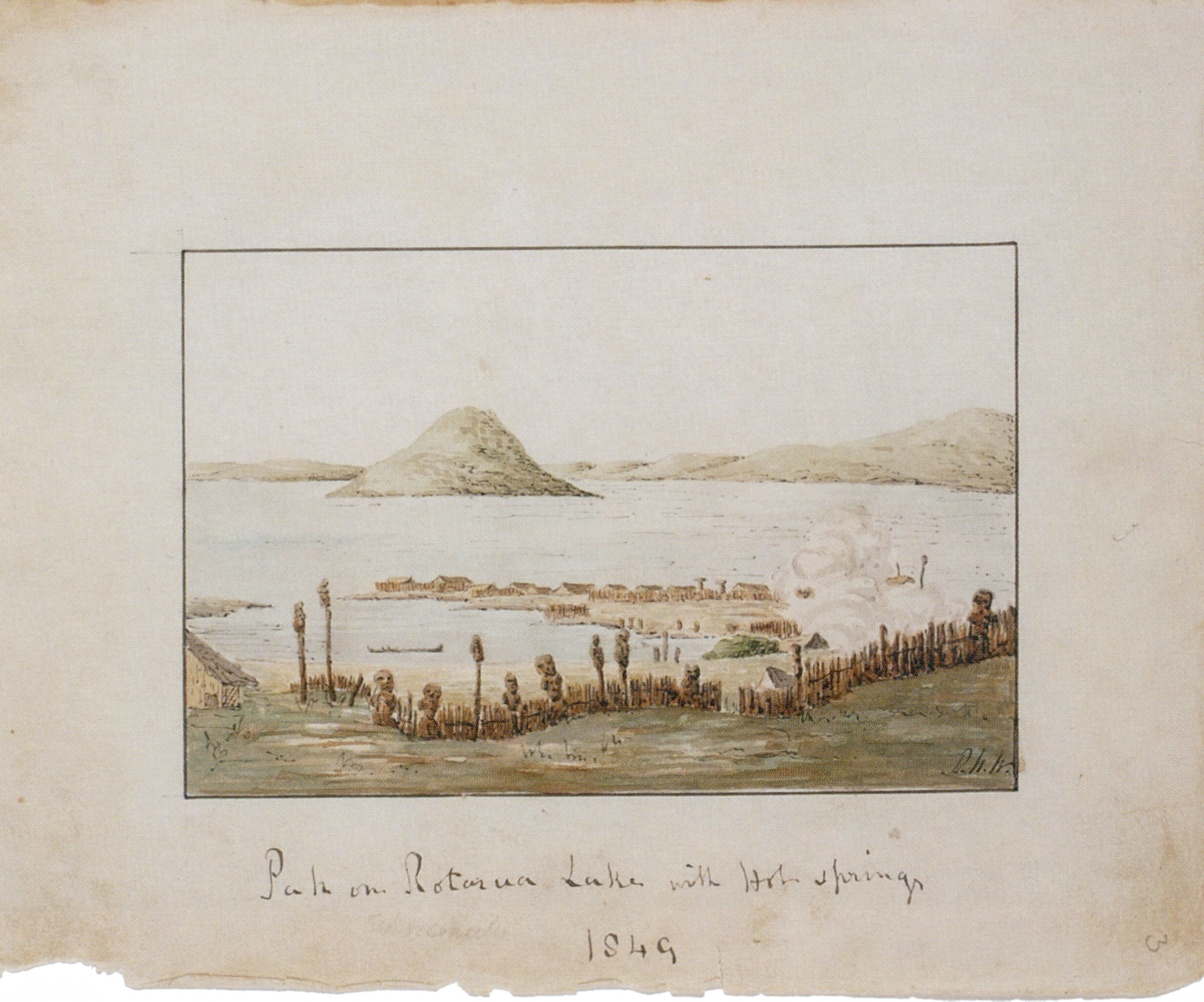
Pah on Rotorua Lake with Hot Springs, 1849

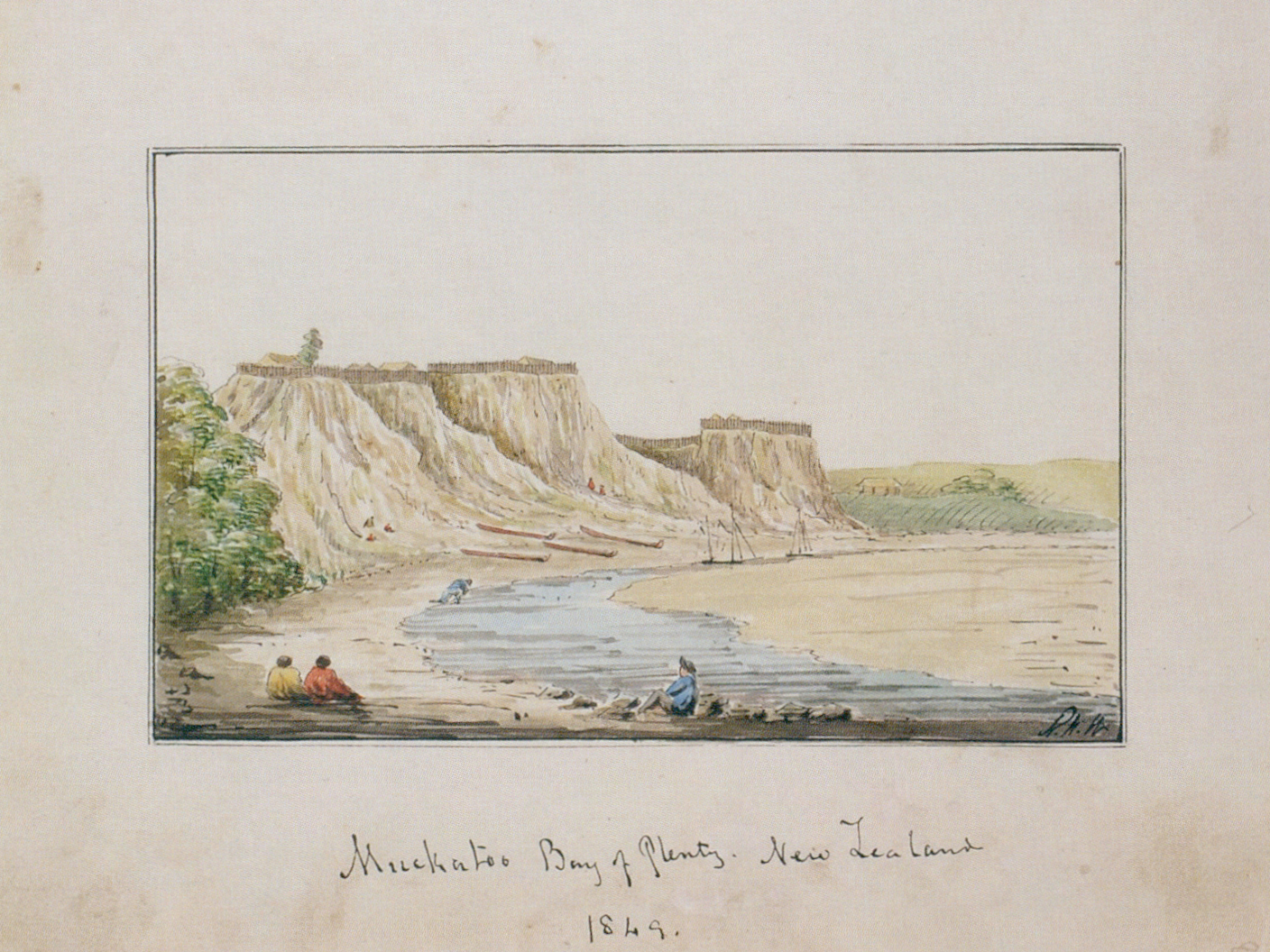
Mockatoo Bay of Plenty, New Zealand, 1849

== Bibliography ==
- Brett, André (June 2016). Acknowledge No Frontier – The Creation and Demise of New Zealand's Provinces, 1853–76. Dunedin: Otago University Press. ISBN 978-1-927322-36-9.
- McLean, Gavin (2006). The Governors: New Zealand's Governors and Governors-General. Dunedin: Otago University Press. ISBN 1-877372-25-0. Archived from the original on 24 June 2013.

Political offices
New office	Superintendent of Auckland Province; 1853–1855	Succeeded by William Brown
Government offices
Preceded by George Grey	Governor of the Cape Colony, acting 1861–1862	Succeeded by Sir Philip Wodehouse
