= Wynyard, New South Wales =

Wynyard
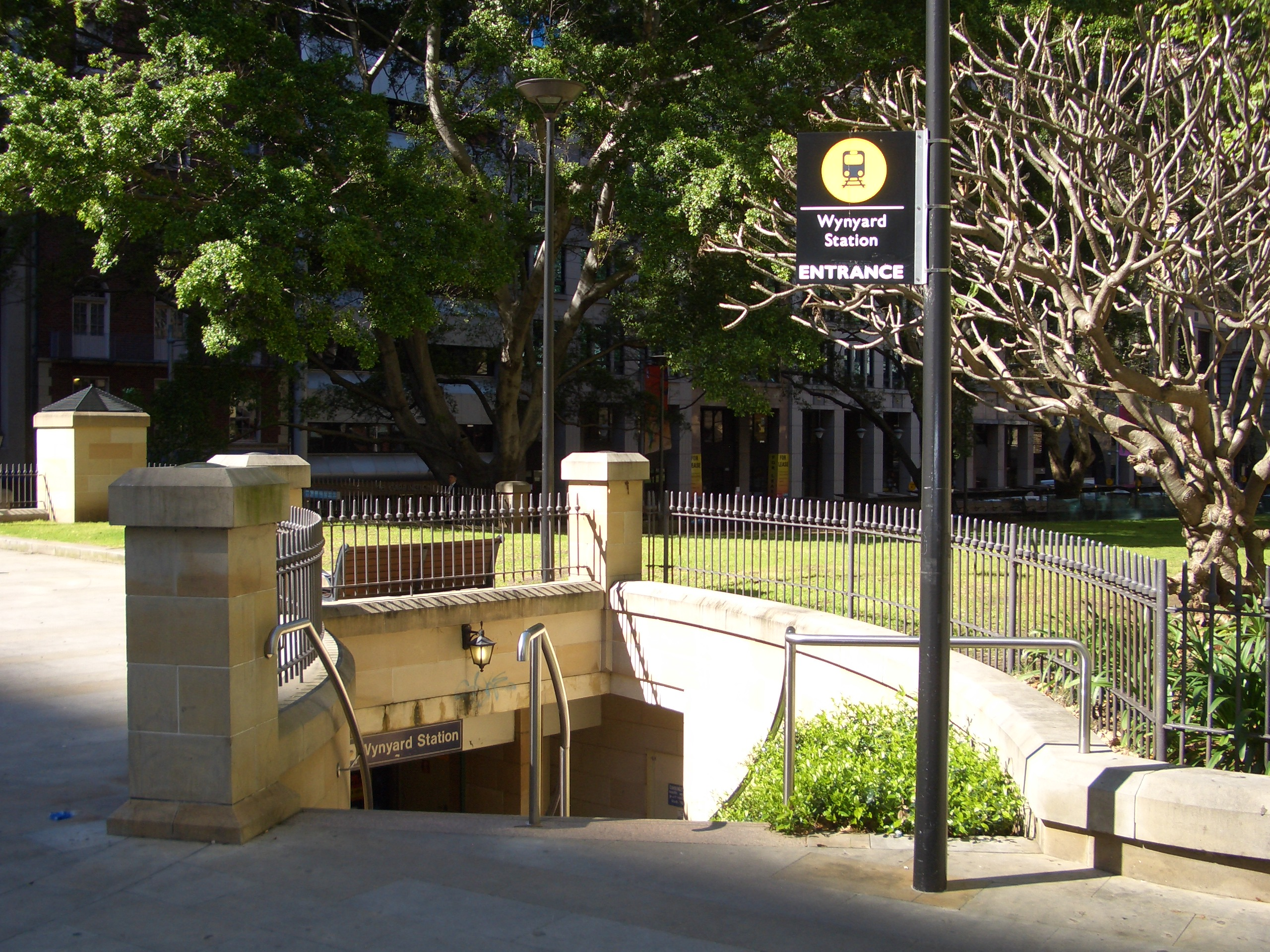
- Wynyard railway station entrance

- Interactive map of Wynyard
- Coordinates: 33.865648°S 151.205514°E
- Country: Australia
- State: New South Wales
- City: Sydney
- LGA: City of Sydney

Government
  - State electorate: Sydney
  - Federal division: Sydney
- Postcode: 2000
Localities around Wynyard
Millers Point	The Rocks	Circular Quay
Barangaroo	Wynyard	Sydney CBD
Barangaroo	Sydney CBD	Sydney CBD

Wynyard (/ˈwɪnjərd/) is an urban locality adjacent to Wynyard railway station in the Sydney central business district of New South Wales, Australia. Wynyard is part of the local government area of the City of Sydney. The postcode is 2000. Wynyard Park is a prominent landmark in this area.

== History ==
The area now known as Wynyard was the site of the first military barracks in Australia between 1792 and 1818. The land was later subdivided for private development, but a portion was retained as open space, eventually becoming Wynyard Square.

Wynyard was named in honour of Major-General Edward Buckley Wynyard, a former British Army officer who, in September 1847, was put in command of the troops in New South Wales, Van Diemen's Land and New Zealand.

== Transport ==
Wynyard railway station is located underground and is a major Sydney Trains railway station, serviced by six lines. It is also a major bus terminal, serving as the CBD terminus for many routes from the Northern Beaches and North Shore.
