= New South Wales Post Office Directory =

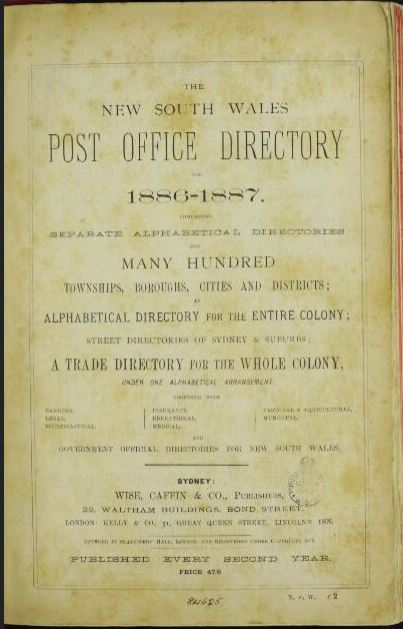
New South Wales Post Office Directory, title page, 1886-87

The New South Wales Post Office Directory, also known as Wise's Directories or Wise's Street Directories, was published in Sydney, Australia. The directory was published from 1886 to 1950.

== History ==
The directory was published every two years until 1900, when it became an annual publication. The directory was originally published by Wise, Caffin & Co. The directories provided information by locality, individual surname, government service, and by trade or profession. Early publications included a street directory for Sydney and its suburbs, and this later expanded to include Newcastle and West Maitland. Advertisements for local business were also present throughout the directories.

The name of the directory changed over time:

- 1886/87-1893/94: New South Wales Post Office Directory
- 1894/95-1898/99: New South Wales Post Office commercial directory
- 1900-03: New South Wales Post Office Commercial Directory (Wise's)
- 1904-08: New South Wales Post Office Directory (Wise's)
- 1909-15: Wise's New South Wales Post Office Directory
- 1916-30: Wise's New South Wales Post Office Directory including Federal Capital Territory
- 1931-38: Wise's New South Wales Post Office Commercial Directory including Federal Capital Territory
- 1939: Wise's New South Wales Post Office Commercial Directory including Australian Capital Territory
- 1940-50: Wise's New South Wales Post Office Commercial Directory

The directories are a source of information for family history or research on New South Wales from 1886-1950, and are known colloquially as 'Wise Directories' or 'Wise Street Directories'.

The first directory was priced at 47 shillings and 6 pence.

== Digitisation ==
The directories have been digitised in Trove by The National Library of Australia.
