= Wynyard Park, Sydney =

Public park in Sydney, Australia

Wynyard Park
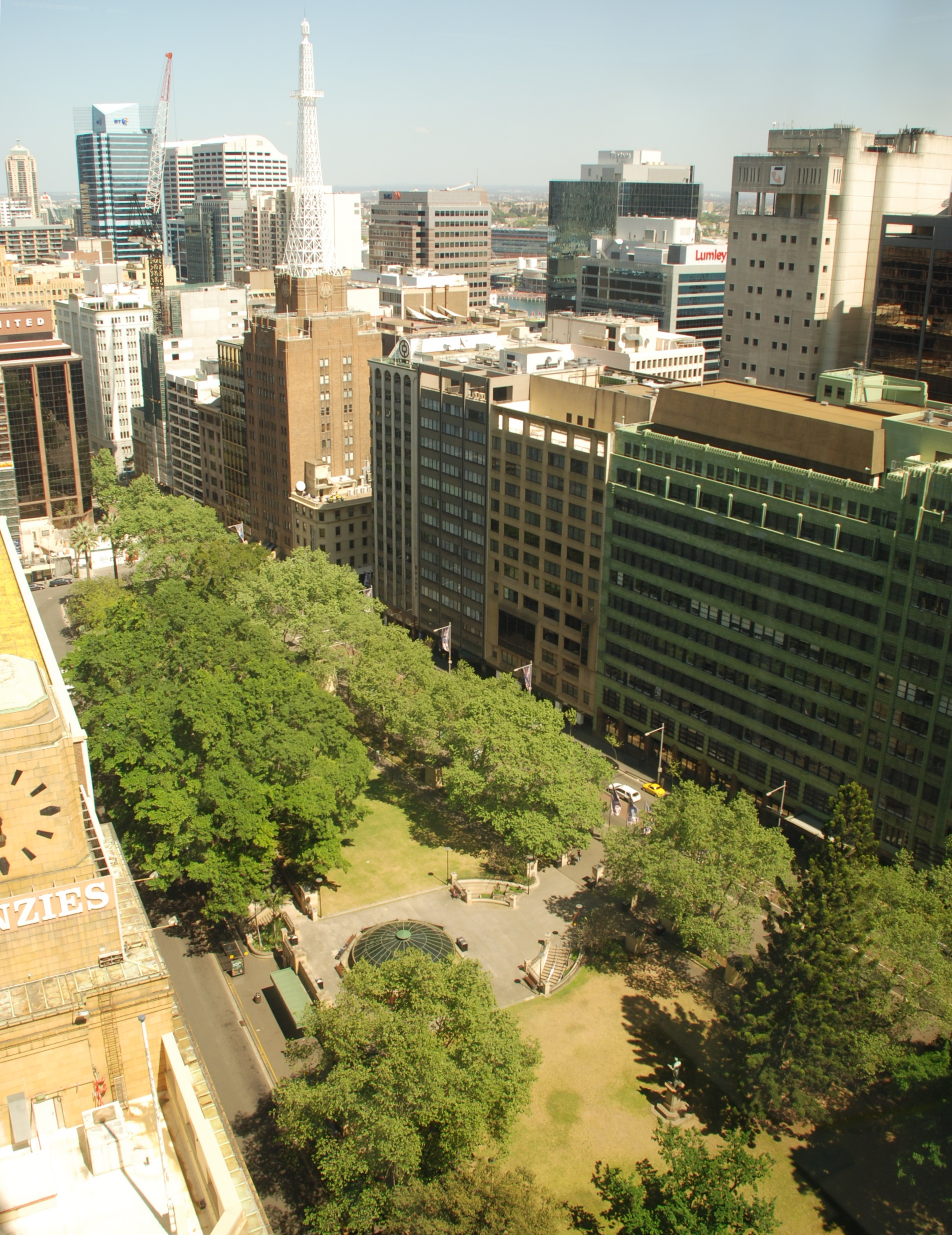
- Wynyard Park seen from north

- Location within Sydney
- Type: Urban park
- Location: York, Carrington, Margaret and Wynyard Streets, Sydney central business district, City of Sydney, Sydney, New South Wales, Australia
- Coordinates: 33°51′57″S 151°12′22″E
- Area: 0.7 hectares (2 acres)
- Created: 1887
- Designer: Mortimer Lewis (1835–1849); Charles Moore (1848–1896)
- Etymology: General Edward Buckley Wynyard
- Operator: City of Sydney
- Open: 24 hours
- Status: Open all year
- Public transit: : ////: Wynyard; : Barangaroo; : Wynyard; : Wynyard

New South Wales Heritage Database (Local Government Register)
- Official name: Wynyard Park Including Parkland, Mature Trees, Remnant Fences, Underground; Wynyard Square
- Type: Local government (landscape)
- Criteria: a., c., d.
- Designated: 9 December 2005
- Reference no.: 65
- Group: Parks, Gardens and Trees
- Category: Urban park

New South Wales Heritage Database (Local Government Register)
- Official name: Archaeological item – Wynyard Park
- Type: Local government (archaeological – terrestrial)
- Criteria: a., c., d.
- Designated: 6 December 2006
- Group: Defence
- Category: Barracks and housing

Wynyard Park is a 0.7-hectare (2-acre) urban park in the Sydney central business district, in Sydney, New South Wales, Australia. Wynyard Park is bounded by York, Carrington, Margaret and Wynyard Streets. Surrounded by modern high-rise buildings it is one of the most densely built-up and intensively used parks in Sydney. Entrances to Wynyard railway station are located on the north-eastern and north-western corners of the park.

Wynyard Park is the site of the first military barracks in Australia, the present park having its location, form and dimensions from the space of the original parade ground that the barracks occupied. The site is one of Australia's oldest parks to be continuously set aside as open space for public use in an urban context. The park has maintained its role as an open square for public meetings, political protests, entertainment, assembly and passive recreation since its dedication as a public park in 1887.

Wynyard Park is a popular place for office workers to eat lunch. Also, many bus services to the northern suburbs originate their journeys in the streets bordering the park.

== History ==
The space which is now Wynyard Park was originally the parade ground of the first military barracks established shortly after the European colonisation of Sydney in 1788. It was from the park that the New South Wales Corps marched to arrest Governor Bligh in 1808, an event later known as the Rum Rebellion. In July of 1829 soldiers from the British Army regiments were recorded as playing football (unknown rules) on the parade ground, the earliest documented instance.

Following the 1848 completion of Victoria Barracks, the Wynyard Park barracks site was subdivided and private dwellings and shops were developed. Provision was made for a square to remain on the higher part of the former Barrack Square. From 1848-1887 the area was known as Wynyard Square, named after General Wynyard, Commander of British Forces in Australia, from 1848 to 1853. The square was dedicated as a recreation ground in 1875 and fenced and landscaped. Like similar squares in England its use was confined to residents who held keys to the gates, although by 1907 the American trend of removing fences around parks had been copied here.

The original George Street military barracks were much larger in area, extending from Barrack Street in the south to almost Jamieson Street in the north, and extending west to Clarence Street

Also in the 1880s a bus terminus was established for passengers from the southern suburbs, beginning the area’s long association with public transport. The building of a railway station here was first suggested in 1881 but it was 1932 before Wynyard Station opened. The square was dedicated as a public park in 1887 and the following year a bandstand was erected in the centre of the park. The park's most significant period was 1890 to 1910 when it was well planned and established. Its layout reflects this late Victorian Period in its landscape design. Colonial Architect Mortimer Lewis (1835-1849) and the Director of the Sydney Botanic Gardens Charles Moore (1848-1896), influenced the design of the park. From 1887 it became known as Wynyard Park.

When the Sydney underground railways (now part of the Sydney Trains network) were constructed in 1927, Wynyard railway station was constructed by excavating the park and then rebuilding the park after the station had been constructed.

== Description ==
At the northern end of the park is a statue by Giovanni Fontana from 1890 of John Dunmore Lang, the Presbyterian minister and controversialist, lived at Wynyard Square and was responsible for the erection of the Scots Church in 1826. His statue is close to the church, formerly the main Presbyterian church in central Sydney.

The ornate underground men’s lavatory with a domed glass roof was built in 1912 and is similar to others at Hyde Park, Taylor Square and Macquarie Place Park.

The park includes mature border plantings of Moreton Bay figs (Flindersia Australis) and plane trees, an Art Nouveau toilet block including fences, signs and lights, and sandstone walls.

== Gallery ==
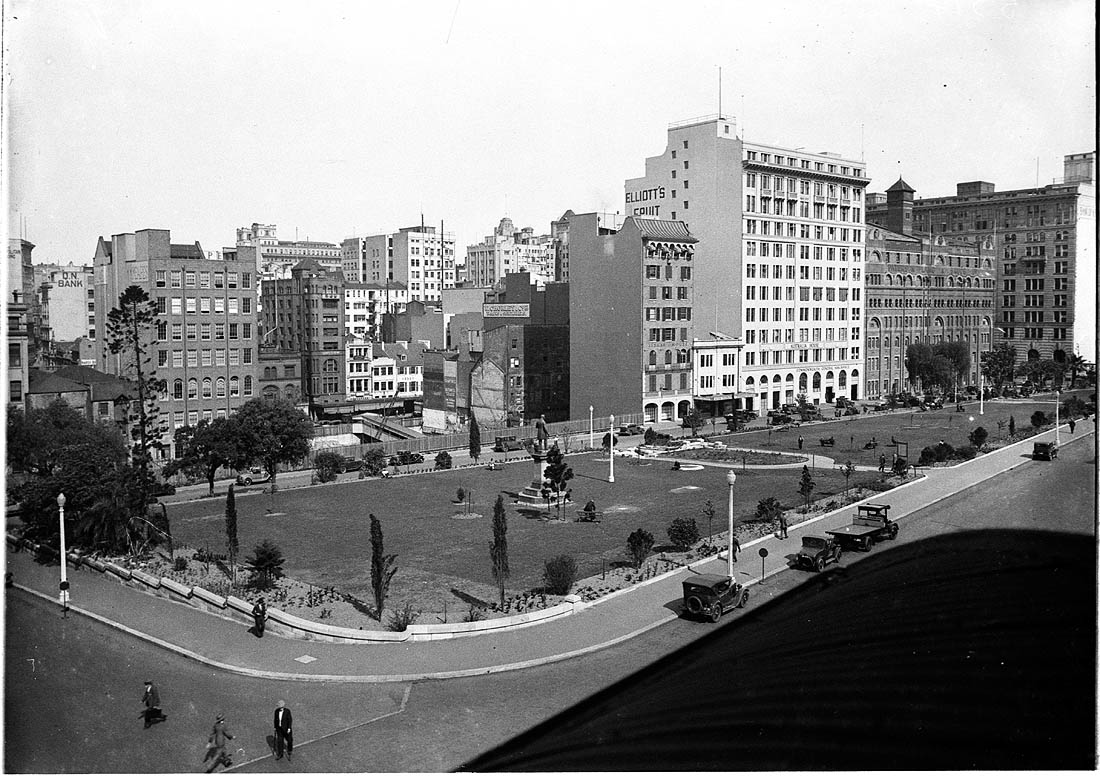
Wynyard Park in the 1930s

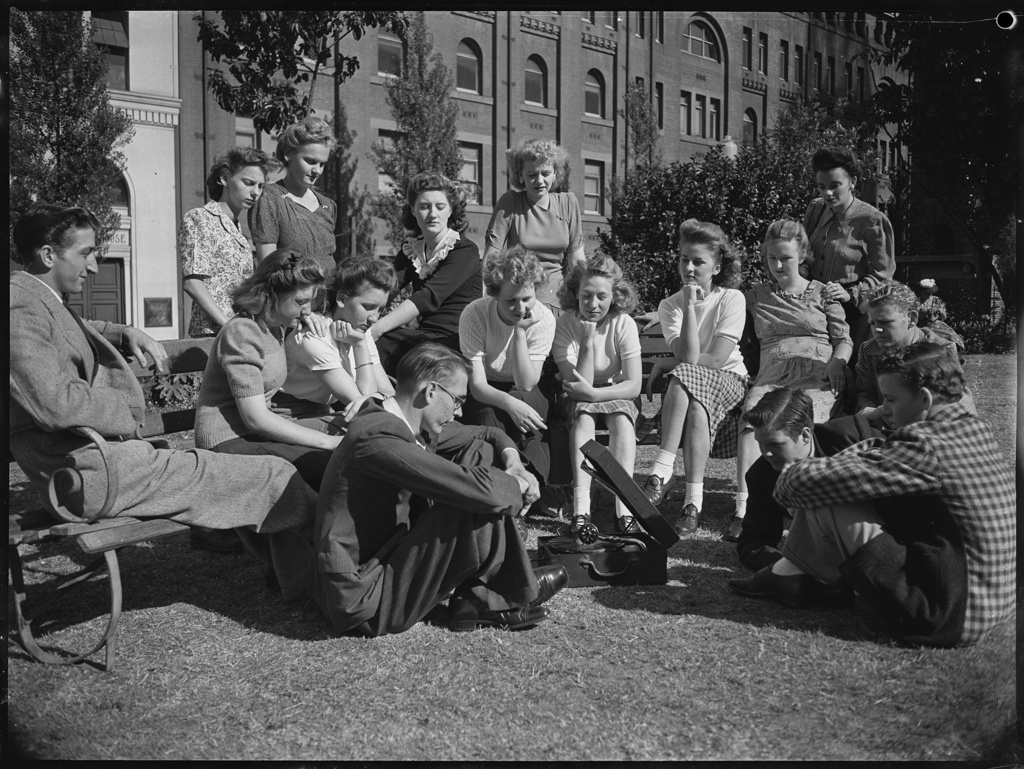
Frank Sinatra fans listen to his records in Wynyard Park, 1945.

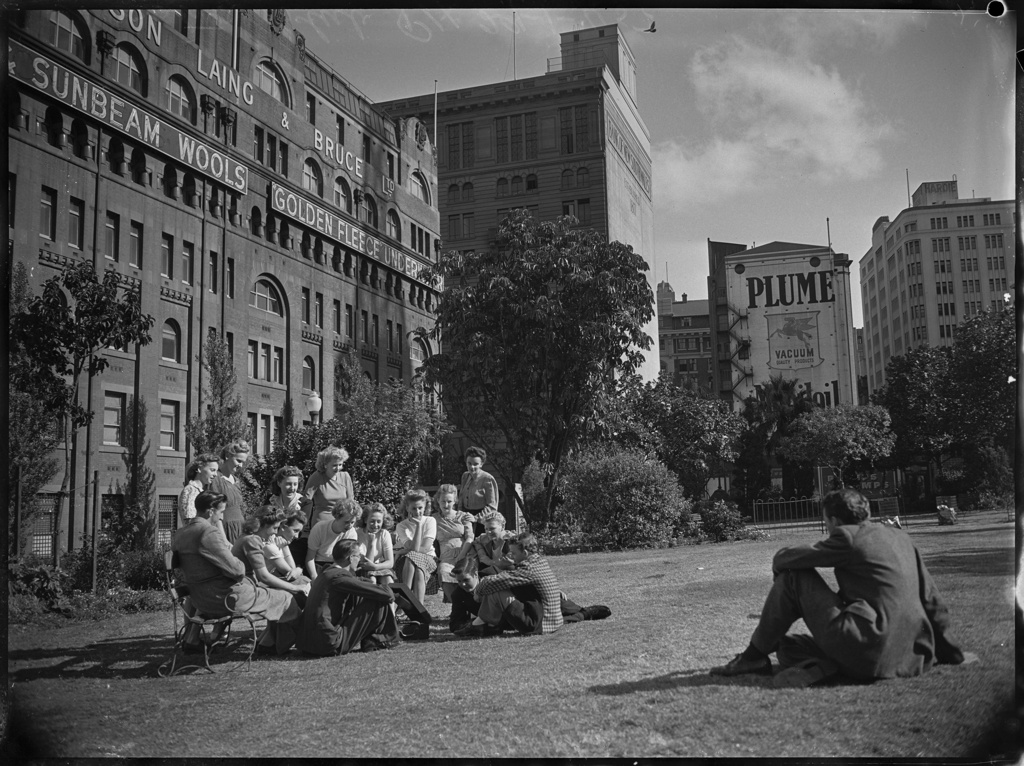
A wider view of the Sinatra fans, showing more detail of the park.

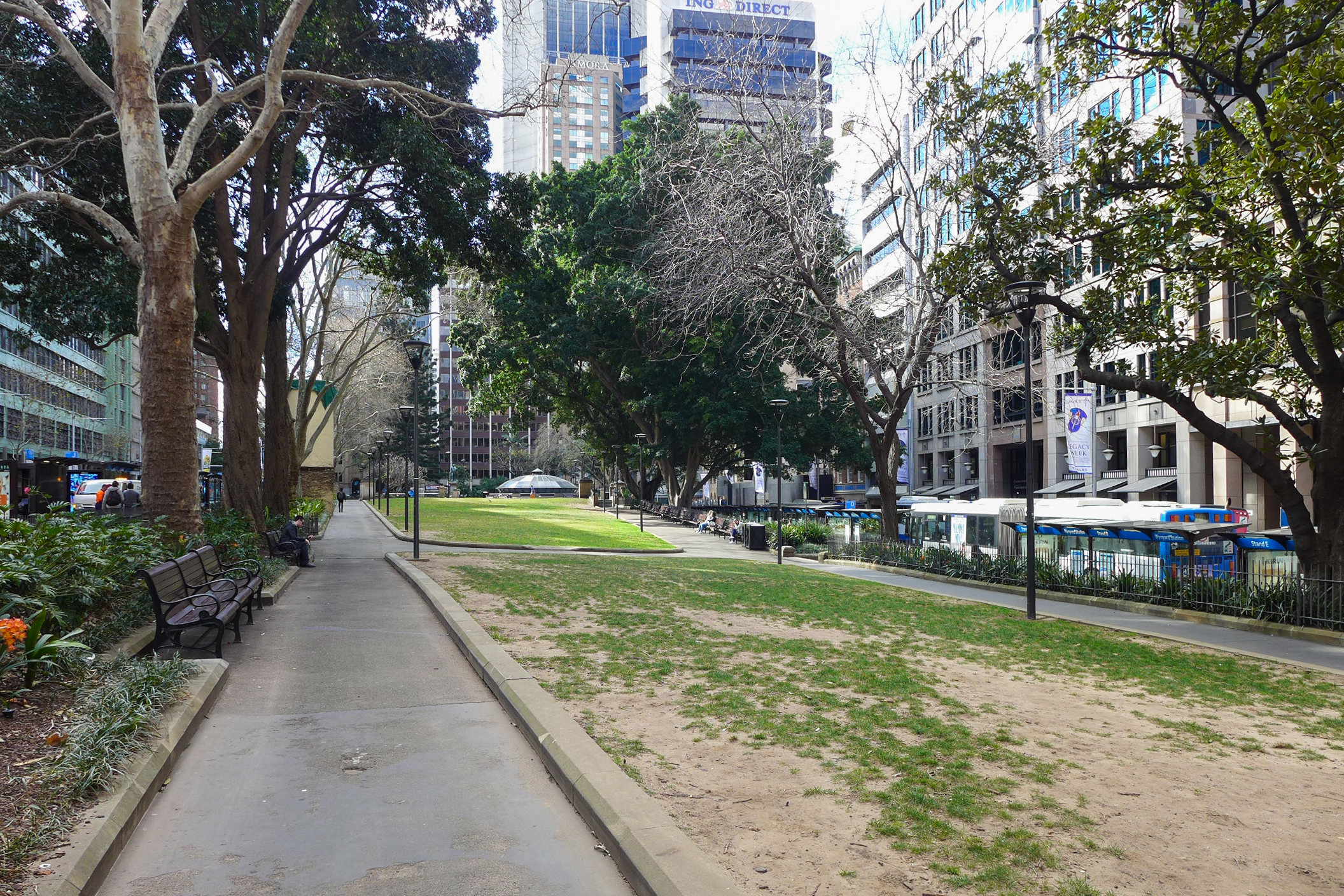
Wynyard Park in 2017

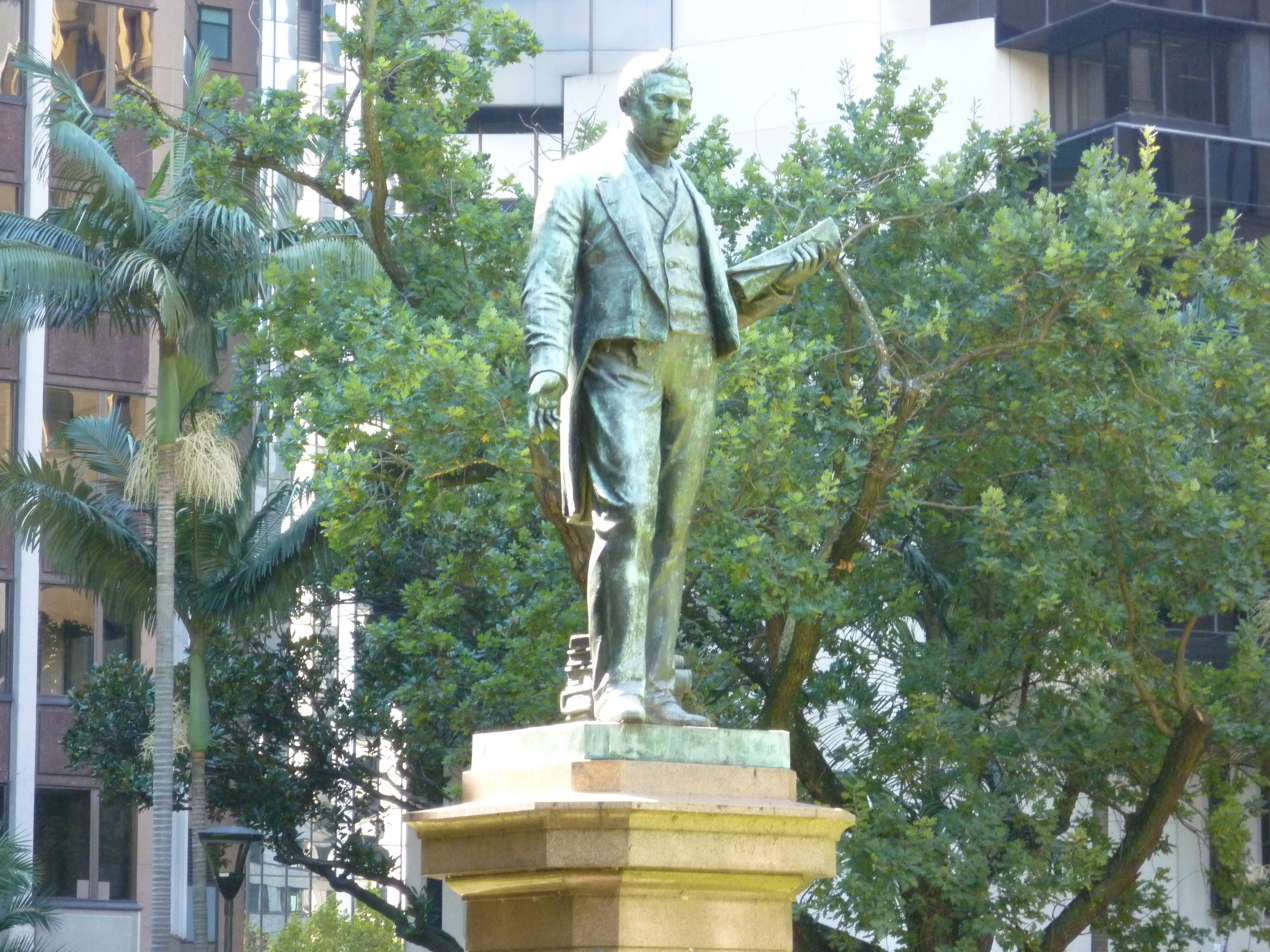
Giovanni Fontana's 1890 statute of Reverend J.D. Lang, pictured in 2016

== See also ==
- Wynyard, Sydney
- List of parks in Sydney
