= William Wynyard (British Army officer) =

British military officer (1759–1819)

Lieutenant-General William Wynyard
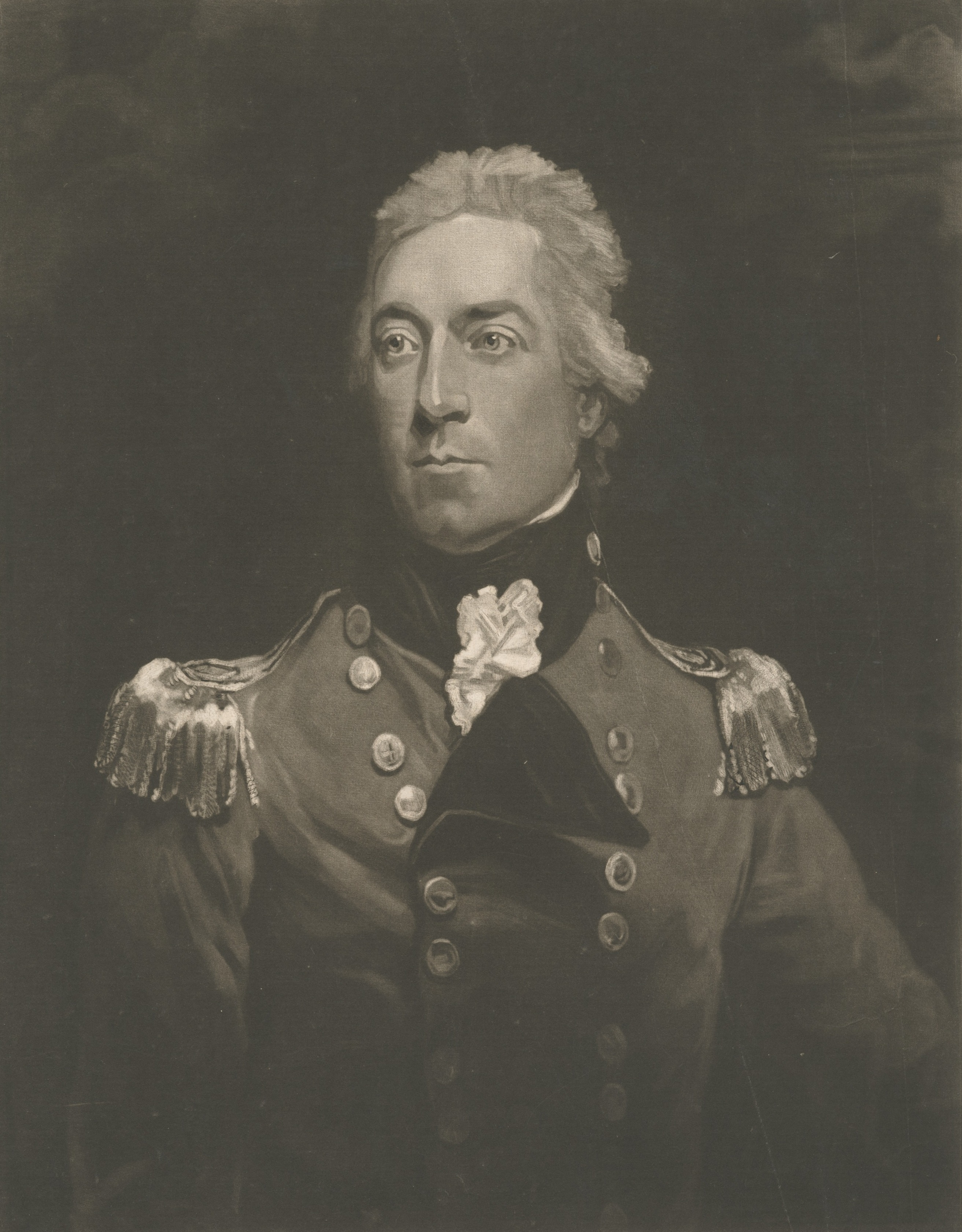
- Born: 20 June 1759
- Died: 11 July 1819 (aged 60)
- Relatives: Edward Wynyard (son); Robert Wynyard (son)
- Military career
- Allegiance: United Kingdom
- Branch: British Army
- Rank: Lieutenant-General
- Commands: Northern District
- Conflicts: American Revolutionary War; Battle of Brandywine; French Revolutionary Wars; Battle of Raismes; Battle of Famars; Siege of Valenciennes; Battle of Lincelles; Siege of Dunkirk; Battle of Cateau; Battle of Tournay

Lieutenant-General William Wynyard (20 June 1759 – 11 July 1819) was a British Army officer who served as General Officer Commanding Northern District.

== Military career ==
Born the son of Lieutenant General William Wynyard (1732–1789) and Catherine St. Leger, Wynyard was commissioned as an ensign on 23 November 1775.

He was severely wounded at the Battle of Brandywine in September 1777 during the American Revolutionary War. During the French Revolutionary Wars he was present at the Battle of Raismes in May 1793, the Battle of Famars also in May 1793, the Siege of Valenciennes in June 1793, the Battle of Lincelles in August 1793, the Siege of Dunkirk in September 1793, the Battle of Le Cateau in March 1794 and the Battle of Tournay in May 1794.

He became commanding officer of the 2nd battalion of the Coldstream Guards as well as Deputy Adjutant-General at the War Office in 1799. He went on to be Colonel of the West India Rangers in October 1806 and Colonel of the 5th Regiment of Foot from November 1812 to his death. He was made General Officer Commanding Northern District in 1814. and also served as equerry to King George III.

He died in 1819. He had married Jane Gladwin, lady-in-waiting to Queen Charlotte, and had 4 children. His son Edward Buckley Wynyard became a full general in the British Army and his son Robert Henry Wynyard became a Major-General and Governor of New Ulster, an early province of New Zealand.

Military offices
Preceded by Sir Charles Green	GOC Northern District; 1814–1815	Succeeded by Sir Lowry Cole
