= John Sands (printer) =

John Sands (12 November 1818 – 16 August 1873) was an English-born Australian engraver, printer and stationer. He founded the John Sands company and published the Sands Directory.

Sands was born in Sandhurst, Berkshire, and immigrated to Sydney in 1837. G. P. Walsh notes that "especially notable were his directories, almanacs, gazetteers and prints by F. C. Terry and S. T. Gill depicting colonial life".
