= Wyangala Dam =

Dam in New South Wales, Australia

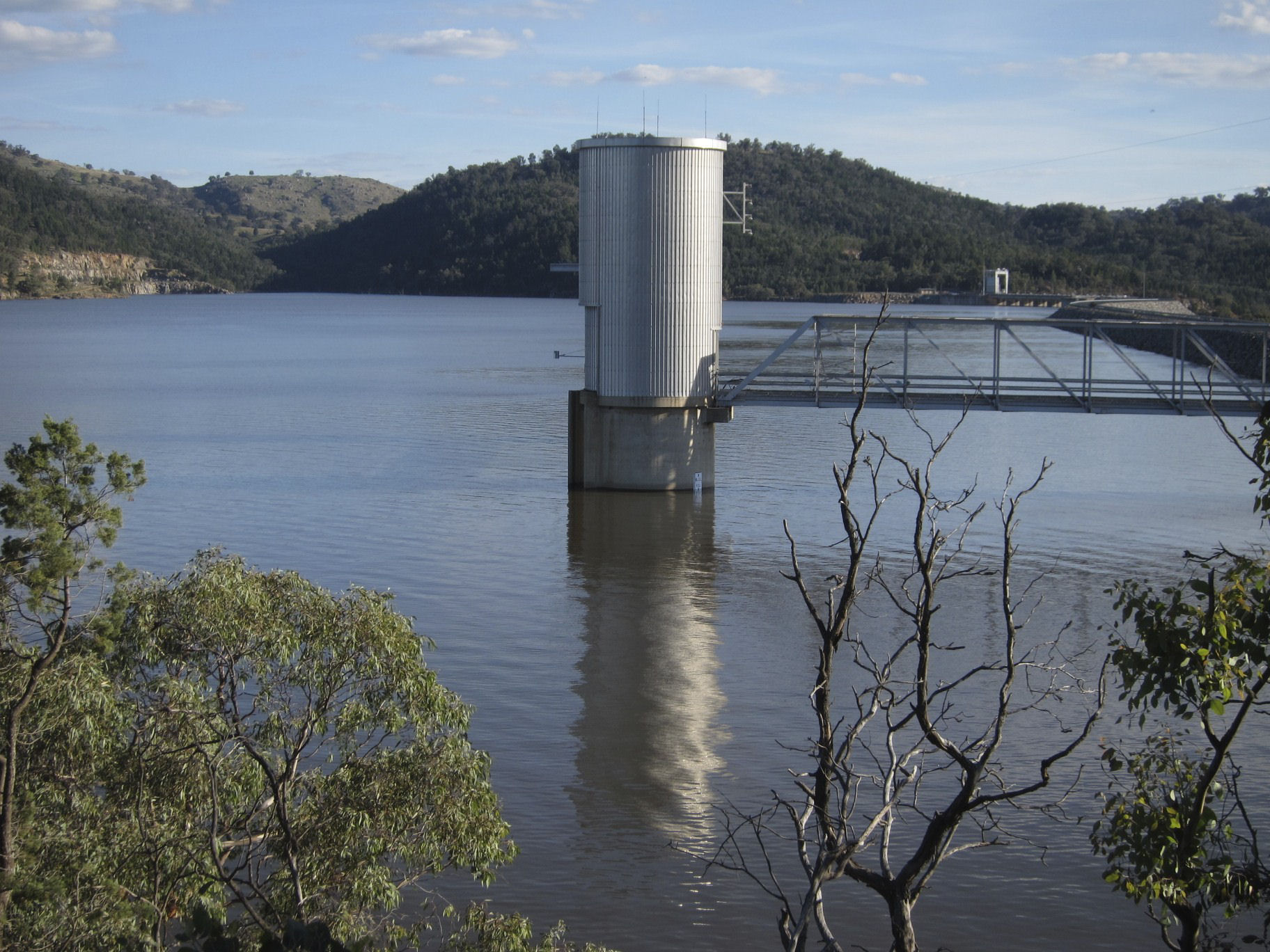
- The dam, near full capacity, 2012

- Location of the dam in New South Wales
- Interactive map of Wyangala Dam
- Country: Australia
- Location: Central West, New South Wales
- Coordinates: 33°58′23″S 148°57′02″E
- Purpose: Flood mitigation; Power generation; Irrigation; Water supply; Conservation
- Status: Operational
- Construction began: 1928
- Opening date: 1935 (gravity dam); 1971 (embankment dam)
- Construction cost: A£1.352 million
- Owner: Water NSW

Dam and spillways
- Type of dam: Rock-filled embankment; Gravity dam
- Impounds: Lachlan River
- Height: 85 m (279 ft)
- Length: 1,370 m (4,490 ft)
- Dam volume: 3,580×10^{3} m^{3} (126×10^{6} cu ft)
- Spillways: 9
- Spillway type: Radial gates and concrete chute
- Spillway capacity: 14,700 m^{3}/s (520,000 cu ft/s)

Reservoir
- Creates: Lake Wyangala
- Total capacity: 1,220 GL (990,000 acre⋅ft)
- Active capacity: 1,217 GL (987,000 acre⋅ft)
- Catchment area: 8,300 km^{2} (3,200 sq mi)
- Surface area: 5,390 ha (13,300 acres)
- Maximum water depth: 79 m (259 ft)
- Normal elevation: 379 m (1,243 ft) AHD

Wyangala Power Station
- Coordinates: 33°58′04″S 148°56′48″E
- Operator: Hydro Power
- Commission date: 1947; 1992
- Type: Conventional
- Installed capacity: 22.5 MW (30,200 hp)
- Annual generation: 42.9 GWh (154 TJ)
- Website waternsw.com.au

The Wyangala Dam is a major gated embankment and gravity dam across the Lachlan River, located in the south-western slopes region of New South Wales, Australia. The dam's purpose includes flood mitigation, hydro-power, irrigation, water supply and conservation. The impounded reservoir is called Lake Wyangala.

== Location and features ==
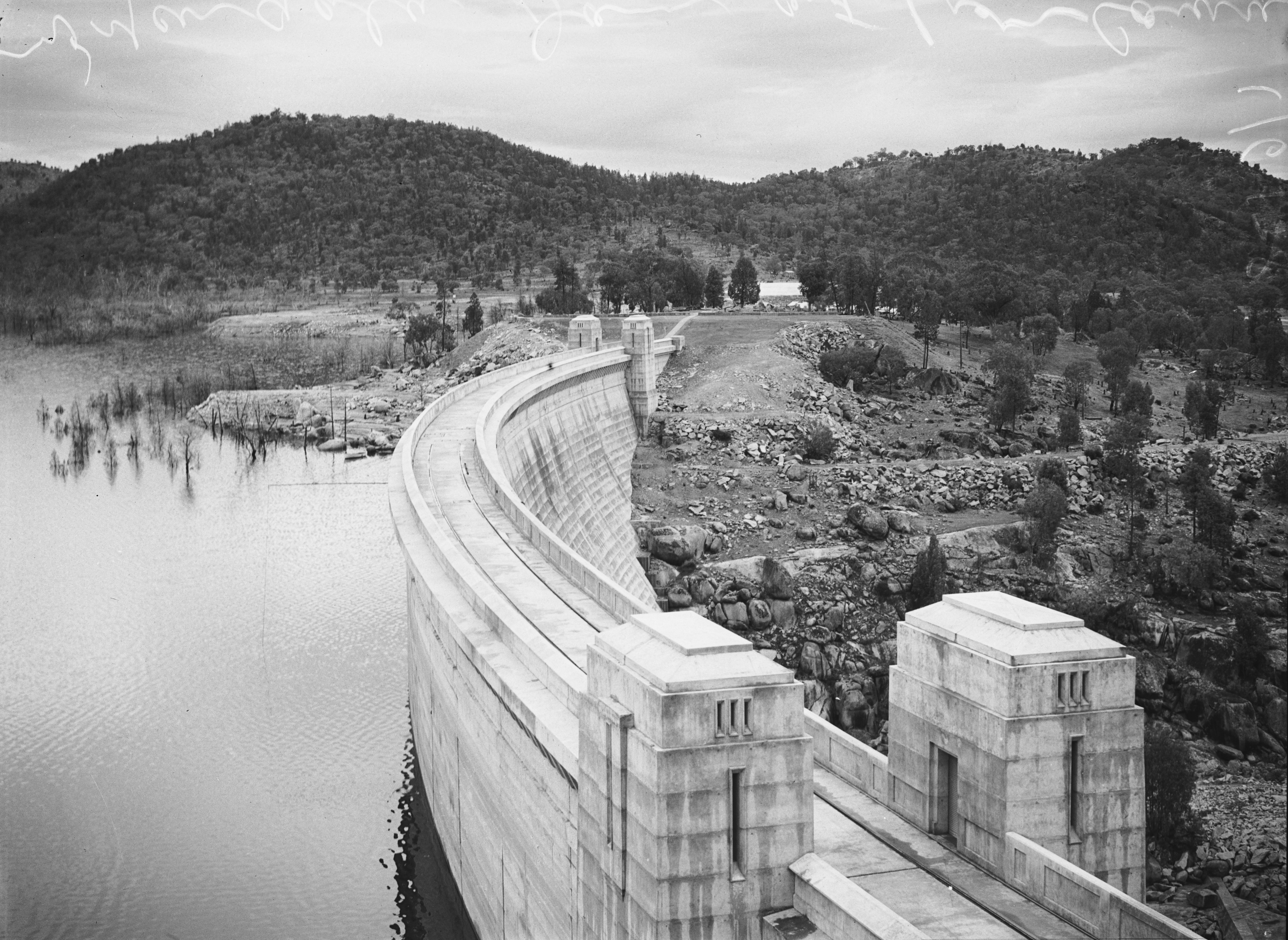
The original gravity dam wall, 1938

Commenced in 1928, completed in 1935, and upgraded in 1971, Wyangala Dam is a major reservoir situated below the confluence of the Lachlan and Abercrombie rivers, located approximately 38 km (24 mi) upstream, east of Cowra. The dam was built by the New South Wales Water Conservation & Irrigation Commission to supply water for irrigation, flood mitigation and potable water for the towns of Cowra, Forbes, Parkes, Condobolin, Lake Cargelligo, Euabalong and Euabalong West. The dam also provides water for a far larger area and operates in conjunction with Lake Brewster and Lake Cargelligo, to supply water to the lower Lachlan valley customers.

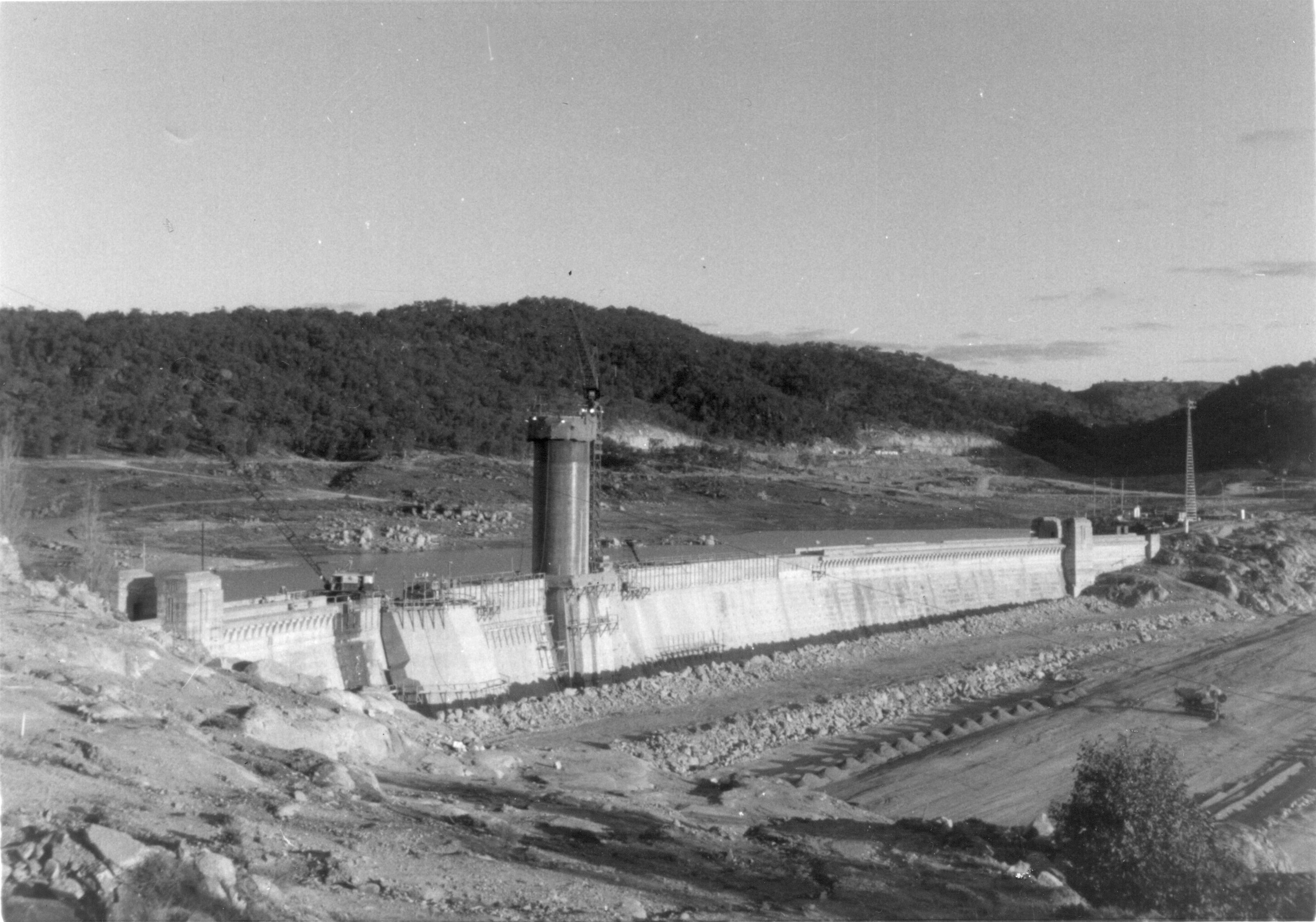
Construction of the rock-filled embankment, 1966

Completed in 1935, the initial structure was a concrete gravity dam that was 58.8 metres (193 ft) high. The resultant reservoir, when full, had a maximum capacity of 374,860 megalitres (303,900 acre⋅ft) and a surface area of 25.2 square kilometres (9.7 sq mi). The 1971 upgrade added the rock-filled embankment with a clay core that was built downstream of the original concrete wall. At the same time, a new spillway was added, along with a road bridge over the spillway and new low-level and high-level outlets.

The resultant rock-fill embankment dam wall is 85 metres (279 ft) high and 1,370 metres (4,490 ft) long. When full, the maximum water depth of the reservoir is 79 metres (259 ft) and has capacity of 1,220 gigalitres (990,000 acre⋅ft) at 379 metres (1,243 ft) AHD. The surface area of Lake Wyangala is 5,390 hectares (13,300 acres) and the catchment area is 8,300 square kilometres (3,200 sq mi). The eight radial gates and with a concrete chute spillway are capable of discharging 14,700 cubic metres per second (520,000 cu ft/s).

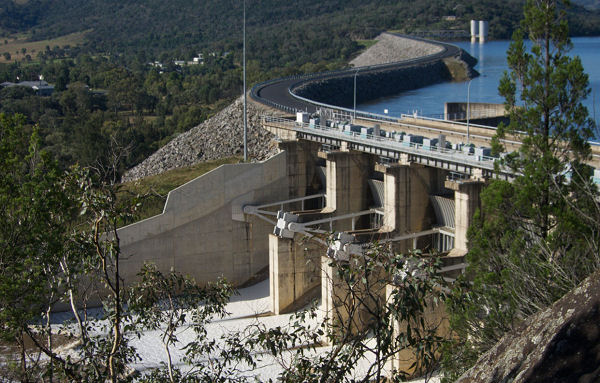
The spillway gates in 2014, after the 2009 upgrade

An A$43 million upgrade of facilities commenced in 2009 and raised and locked the spillway radial gates; raised the spillway chute wall; and raised the parapet wall crest. A further upgrade to raise the dam wall by 10 metres (33 ft) and add 650,000 megalitres (530,000 acre⋅ft) of capacity, estimated to cost A$650 million, was announced in 2019. However, in 2023, after spending an estimated A$74 million, the project was cancelled, with projected costs estimated at A$4 billion and marginal benefit to landholders. As part of the upgrade, a new bridge was built downstream of the dam wall for vehicle access across the river and a water treatment plant were completed.

The Wyangala Dam is the second oldest dam built for irrigation in New South Wales and was one of the last dams in the state where a railway or tramway system for construction purposes was utilised. It is the only dam on the Lachlan River system, which feeds the Murrumbidgee River, and in turn feeds the Murray River.

=== Power generation ===
A hydro-electric power station generates up to 22.5 MW (30,200 hp) of electricity from the flow of the water leaving Wyangala Dam with an average output of 42.9 GWh (154 TJ) per annum. A 7.5 MW (10,100 hp) station was initially constructed below the dam wall and opened in 1947 – at the time, the largest water turbine in the state – and additional capacity was added in 1992. It was the first privately-owned power station in New South Wales and is operated by Hydro Power.

=== History ===
The name Wyangala is said to originate from an indigenous Wiradjuri word of unknown meaning and is the name of Wyangala Station, one of the properties flooded by Lake Wyangala waters when construction of the dam was completed in 1935. The Wyangala Station homestead site, which was originally settled by the Newham family, is under the water level and can only be seen when the dam is close to being dry. The small settlement of Wyangala, located downstream of the dam wall, was established to house workers during the dam construction.

The current rock-filled wall was constructed between 1961 and 1971 due to fears that the original dam wall was beginning to lift away from its base, and as a result, would not be able to withstand a major flood. The original dam wall can be seen when the water level is around 30 per cent of the reservoir's catchment capacity.

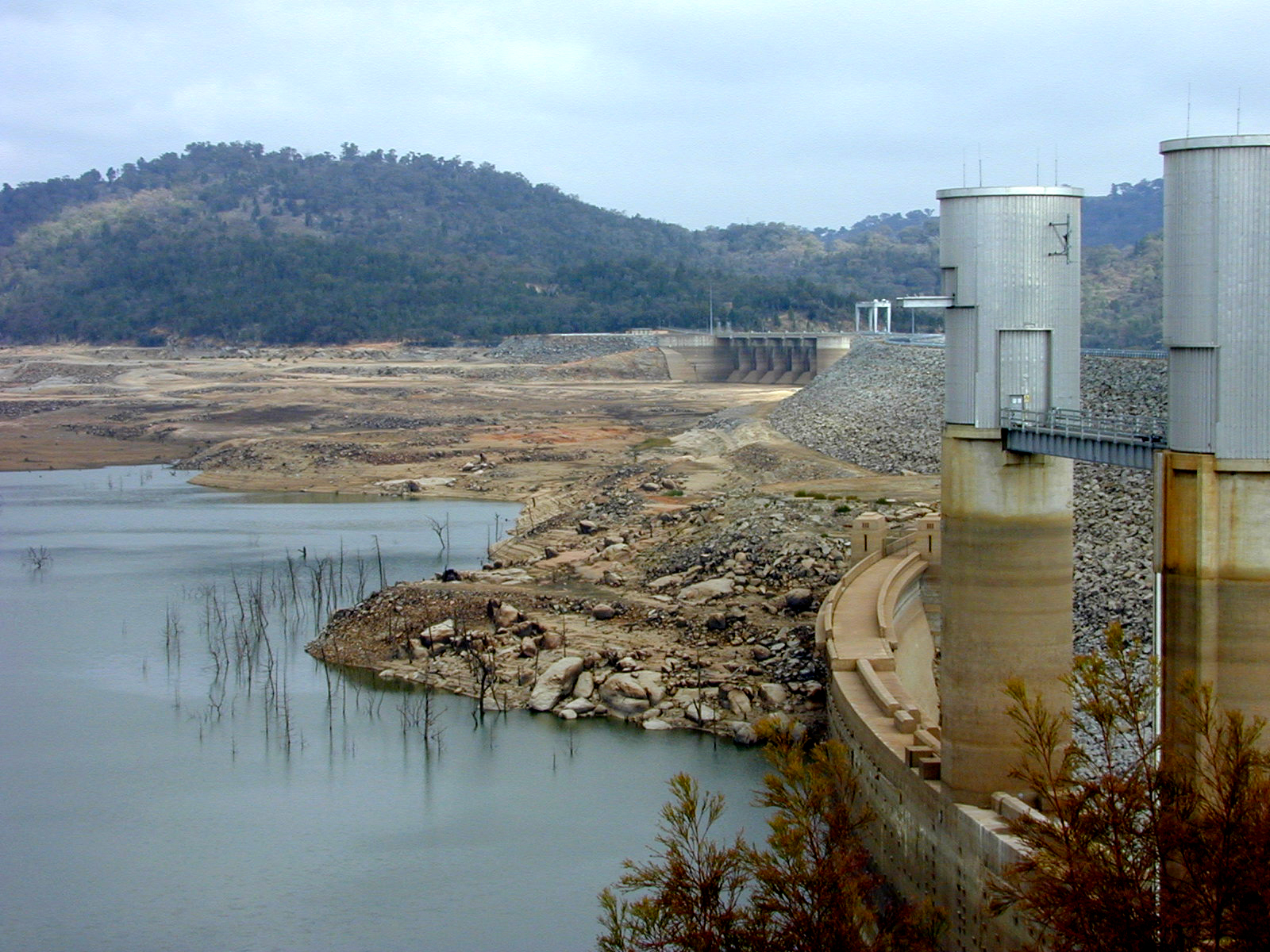
The dam wall and reservoir, during a period of sustained drought, 2003

In 2008, water entitlements were down to just 10 per cent of normal availability. Some inflows to the reservoir later in the year allowed restrictions for high security licence holders to be relaxed. In late 2009, drought had reduced the water storage level to 4.5 per cent of the reservoir's capacity.

The 2022 south eastern Australia floods in late October and early November 2022 resulted in the dam releasing a record 230 gigalitres (8.1×10^{9} cu ft)/day. The previous record release rate was 205 gigalitres (7.2×10^{9} cu ft)/day set in 1990. Downriver, thousands of people were forced to evacuate the town of Forbes as the dam spilled over.

== See also ==
- Irrigation in Australia
- List of dams and reservoirs in New South Wales
- List of hydroelectric power stations in New South Wales
- Lowbidgee Floodplain
