= Darbys Falls, New South Wales =

Darbys Falls New South Wales
- Coordinates: 33°54′55″S 148°51′04″E
- Population: 243 (SAL 2021)
- Postcode(s): 2793
- LGA(s): Cowra Shire
- State electorate(s): Cootamundra
- Federal division(s): Riverina

Darbys Falls is a small village situated 15 km east of Cowra, New South Wales. In 2011, there were 316 people living in Darbys Falls, including 5 indigenous people. The population was 51.9% are male and 48.1% are female.

Located near the village is a public astronomical observatory. There is no school in the village, with Wyangala Dam Public School servicing primary aged students. Secondary students travel to Cowra.

It is situated on the Lachlan River between Wyangala and Cowra. The topography of the land is rough and hilly, featuring large granitoid tors and associated boulders. The area has a significant mining history for various minerals, including gold.

== Lynne Sawyers Reserve ==
In 2012, the village association applied to rename the Darbys Falls Recreational Reserve in honour of Lynne Sawyers. Sawyers was named "Local Australian of the Year" in the Australia Day Honours List for 2012. Sawyers received the award from Prime Minister Julia Gillard for her community work in fostering more than 200 children over 15 years. The Geographical Names Board of New South Wales refused to recognise the "Lynne Sawyers Reserve" because of its policy against naming places in honour of living people. The Cowra Council encouraged the village association to defy the GNB and hold an official renaming ceremony in 2013.
