= Great Cumbungi Swamp =

Wetland in New South Wales, Australia

The Great Cumbungi Swamp
- Location within New South Wales
- Location: New South Wales
- Nearest city: Balranald
- Coordinates: 34°22′27″S 143°57′10.8″E

The Great Cumbungi Swamp is a wetland made up of the ecosystems surrounding the junction of the Murrumbidgee and Lachlan Rivers in the South West Region of New South Wales. When it is at full capacity, the swamp supports a large population of migratory waterbirds as well as one of the largest reed swamps in the Murray Darling Basin. Although sometime referred to as Cumbung Swamp and Great Cumbung Swamp, the official name is Great Cumbungi Swamp.

== Description ==
The Great Cumbungi Swamp is a reed swamp, located at the junction of the Murrumbidgee and termination site of the Lachlan Rivers and covers some 15,000 to 20,000 hectares (37,000 to 49,000 acres) at full capacity, and about 14,000 hectares (35,000 acres) out of flood. The swamp is in South West New South Wales within the Riverina district; its closest township is Balranald.

The swamp is composed of wetland reed beds as well as extensive river red gum woodland areas, some of the largest in the Murray Darling Basin. January 2019 saw the purchase of 33,000 hectares (82,000 acres) including and surrounding the swamp by a private group composed of The Nature Conservancy (TNC) and Tiverton Agriculture, to ensure the protection and sustainability of the area. In January, 2026, TNC was reported to have put The Great Cumbungi up for sale via an openly competitive auction process. Consequently, the Nari Nari Tribal Council (NNTC) took on ownership of the property for its ongoing management and conservation.

== Importance ==
The Great Cumbungi Swamp is recognised nationally as a highly significant ecosystem. This has seen it placed on the Directory of Important Wetlands in Australia as well as the now-defunct Register of the National Estate, ensuring its significance is recognised and thus protected. This significance is mainly due to the Great Cumbungi Swamp being one of the largest remaining reed swamps in eastern Australia as well as its inclusion of unique river red gum forest biomes, which are an at-risk ecosystem.

== Wildlife ==
=== Flora ===
The Great Cumbungi Swamp is a highly diverse ecosystem, home to a range of native vegetation types, both in the aquatic biome, as well as the greater flow on area of the swamp. The main vegetation type found in the Great Cumbungi Swamp is reed beds, mainly Phragmites australis and Typha orientalis, or common cumbungi, as well as Eucalypt forests, mainly river red gums (Eucalyptus camaldulensis). It is estimated that around 2,400 hectares (5,900 acres) of the Great Cumbungi Swamp is covered by reed beds and over 80% inhabited by river red gums. Species of lignum (Muehlenbeckia florulenta) and black box (Eucalyptus largiflorens) are also found in the area, particularly on the flood plains. There are an estimated 207 plant species in the area, with over 120 of these being water based.

It is the remnants of the once populous Phragmites marsh that significantly contribute to the Great Cumbungi Swamp as being recognised as a place of national conservation significance. Therefore, it is a major aim of conservationists to "maintain 95% of the area of permanent and semipermanent wetland communities in good condition" through controlling the flows reaching the regime, as phragmites require such "semipermanent" flooding events. This is further enhanced through the flat gradient of the land, with the alluvial channels of the Lachlan river storing the water for longer periods of time than would occur in steep landscapes.

River red gums are commonly found in the riparian zone of bioregions, whereby flooding occurs in intermittent periods. The tree can thrive in semi-arid areas, such as the Great Cumbungi Swamp, due to their ability to survive up to four years under both dry or flood stress before permanent damage occurs. However, recent changes to river regulation in the Lachlan catchment, has led to a reduction of the required flooding events, with evidence of water stress through both a reduction in vigour as well as a die back of the Eucalypt forests, thus the creation of a management strategy to minimise such.

These outstanding examples of native vegetation, however, are not only threatened by a variation in environmental water flows. The communities are also threatened by introduced plant species as well as land clearance, particularly on the margins of the wetland where vulnerability is high. This was expressed in the 2010 assessment of the Lachlan catchment rating the ratio of native to introduced species of the Great Cumbungi Swamp as "very poor", whilst the rate of habitat disturbance being identified as "high".

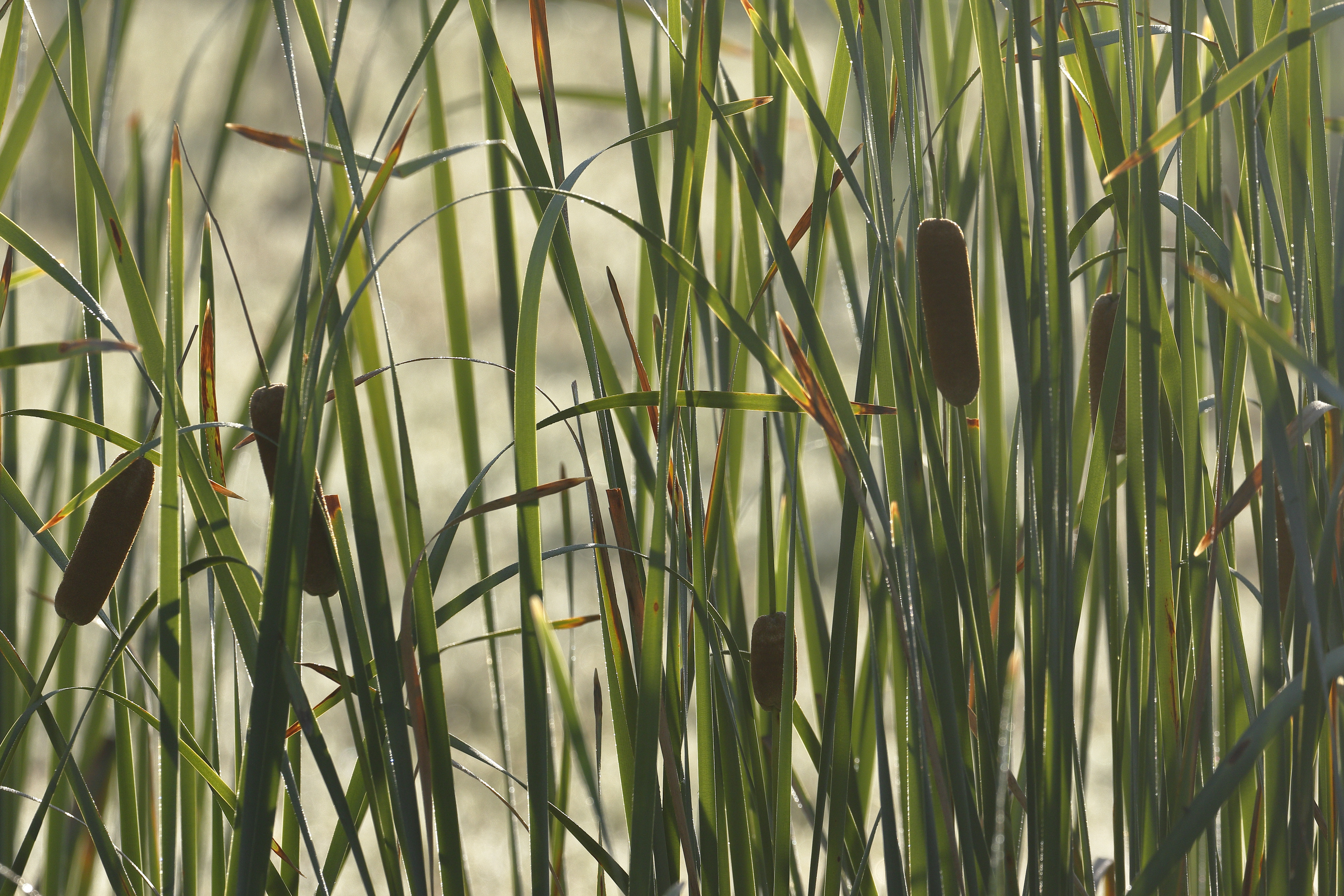
Cumbungi (Typha orientalis) is commonly found in the Great Cumbungi Swamp.

=== Fauna ===
The Great Cumbungi Swamp is a richly diverse ecosystem that is home to a range of species including a range of amphibians, fish, mammals and bird life. This is due to the relatively stable water supply provided by the two river sources, the Lachlan and the Murrumbidgee.

Populations of frogs and other amphibians are often used as bioindicators in wetlands to assess the health of the ecosystem. An assessment of 14 sites along the Great Cumbungi Swamp, and nearby Booligal Wetlands, by the Commonwealth Environmental Water Office found four species of native frog commonly residing in the area. This included the barking marsh frog, great banjo frog, spotted marsh frog and eastern sign-bearing froglet, all of which were found in areas with sufficient water supplies through the summer breeding months, with the report concluding environmental flows play an important role in "maintaining large areas of shallow inundated habitat [which] is important for successful frog breeding".

One of the most important feature of the Great Cumbungi Swamp is its function as a habitat for a range of waterbirds and its role as a breeding site for many of these species, described by the Commonwealth Environmental Water Office as "one of the most important waterbird breeding areas in eastern Australia", which is largely due to the extensive reed beds, of which provide suitable nesting sites for such birds. An estimated 131 bird species inhabit the area, many of these being waterbird species which are reliant on the water of the swamps, particularly in times of drought. Examples of waterbird species that are frequently found in the area include the straw-necked ibis and spoonbills as well as Australasian bittern and Australian painted-snipe, both of which are on the endangered species list. Maintaining the waterbird population in the Great Cumbungi Swamp is a priority of the management of the swamp and the wider Murray Darling Basin. To "improve the complexity and health of priority waterbird habitat to maintain species richness and aid future population recovery" was identified as an objective of the 2015-2016 Environmental Water Plan, by the Murray–Darling Basin Authority, highlighting the importance of the area in the ensuring the management of waterbird populations.

Being a water-based aquatic system, the Great Cumbungi Swamp is also home to a range of fish species, with particularly high numbers found in the deeper channels of the system. Native species found in the catchment include Murray cod, flat-headed gudgeon, Australian smelt and carp gudgeon, with introduced species, including the common carp, also being found in the area. These fish species are highly vulnerable with many, including the silver perch, being placed on the NSW threatened species schedule, which is mainly due to the altercation of river water flows. To ensure fish populations are maintained and the health of the ecosystem continues to thrive, there must be sufficient water flows to the swamp, particularly the Lachlan River, to extend the area of the swamp by linking the various intermittent channels.

As a water-based ecosystem, the Great Cumbungi Swamp is also an important refugee for land-based animals, particularly during times of drought. Common species of mammals found in the area include the eastern grey kangaroo (Macropus giganteus) and echidna (Tachyglossidae), with marsupial species such as the sugar glider (Petaurus breviceps) becoming less common in the area, due to habitat destruction.

Introduced animals, such as the wild pig, have played a further role in habitat destruction, with the establishment of the Western Riverina Pig Program to monitor and control the population throughout the Riverina district including the Great Cumbungi area.

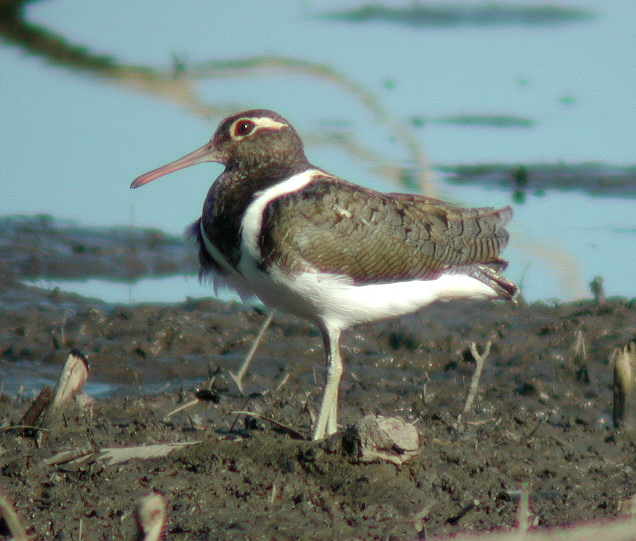
The Australian painted snipe (Rostratula australis) is an example of the waterbird species that depend on the Great Cumbungi Swamp.

== Pre-European occupation of the area ==
Pre-European occupation of the Great Cumbungi Swamp area, in the Riverina District dates back over 40,000 years, with the presence of several Aboriginal groups residing in the area. This includes the Nari-Nari, to the east, Yida-Yida and Mudi-Mudi, to the north, and Gurendji peoples, all of whom made use of the abundant resources surrounding the two rivers. The major group in the Great Cumbungi area, however, was the Wiradjuri people, which translates to 'people of three rivers'. These rivers were the Macquarie, Lachlan, and Murrumbidgee, with the later of the two forming the southern boundary of the group, at the location of the Great Cumbungi Swamp System.

The extensive river systems in the Riverina district allowed for a range of resources to be utilised by the land's first peoples, from hunting for fish in the rivers to the gathering of fruits as well as use of raw materials for shelter and recreational use, evidence of which can be seen through the many scar trees located along both the Lachlan and Murrumbidgee Rivers.

The feeling of connection to the area, particularly the Murrumbidgee River, is captured through the poetry of Iris Clayton, who explores the decline in the river’s health, as well as the need for conservation to protect the area, including the Great Cumbungi Swamp.

No one knows how long he's been there
Twisted, old ravaged beyond repair
Father to many, too many to count.
His dying will be a terrible account
Perhaps if the damage is quickly mended
His shores and banks strongly defended
Old River Bidgee need never be
Another lost legend of the Warrajarree.

— Iris Clayton (1988)

Through the purchase of the properties surrounding and including the Great Cumbungi Swamp, by the TNC and Tiverton Agriculture (see Protection and Conservation) a partnership has been established with the closely located Nari Nari Tribal Council to ensure the cultural inclusion of the Nari Nari people and protection of the area, one which chairman Ian Woods states, the Nari Nari "people are very supportive of the Great Cumbung [sic] purchase and we look forward to working with TNC and Tiverton on plans for its future management."

== Protection and conservation ==
The Great Cumbungi Swamp has been identified as a significant wetland both in the Lower Lachlan Catchment as well as in the wider Murray Darling Basin, seeing it placed on the Directory of Important Wetlands. In 1980, it was listed in the now-defunct Register of the National Estate.

It is therefore evident that the swamp and surrounding areas are important and must be managed. This has not been the case in the past, with the site being managed as agricultural land for the past generations, with the first notable levees being constructed in the mid-1800s.

The area has most recently been run as two adjoining cattle enterprises, with this intensive use of the land leading to a significant decrease in groundwater storage, through the growth of water-dependent pastures. The running of the land for livestock has also seen the clearing of portions of the river red gum forests for access as well as some compaction of the soils.

However, these properties, Juanbung and Boyong, totalling 13,664 hectares (33,765 acres), with almost 8,100 hectares (20,000 acres) making up the Great Cumbungi Swamp, were purchased in January 2019 for A$55 million. The buyers were Australian company Tiverton Agriculture in conjunction with the Nature Conservancy (TNC), whose primary aim was to stop the area from being negatively impacted by the implementation of irrigation schemes, therefore attempting to continue to preserve and regenerate the natural flows of the catchment. Since the purchase, TNC, managed by Tiverton Agriculture, has developed further aims to continue running it as an agricultural property, further emphasising how both conservation and profitability can co-exist. Other land uses identified for the area include "carbon, biodiversity offsets and stewardship, and ecotourism", all of which further the value of the wetland. The total land area protected in the area now amounts to over 200,000 hectares (490,000 acres), with properties owned by the government and private corporations, such as TNC, as well as areas of national park adjacent to the Great Cumbungi Swamp.

These plans, however, must be managed in conjunction with the greater catchments water plans, with the allocated environmental water flows particularly impacting upon the water available to the swamp. Through monitoring of the Lachlan Rivers flow, from as far upstream as Wyangala Dam, the impact river regulation has on the extent and health of the swamp can be assessed. In 2010 the NSW Department of Environment, Climate Change and Water concluded that if 700 gigalitres per day (1 billion cubic feet per hour) were delivered, as measured at the upstream Booligal Weir, limited reed bed flooding would occur, however, 3,000 gigalitres per day (4.4 billion cubic feet per hour) would be required to cause extensive flooding of the swamp.

This is further analysed through the Lachlan Rivers environmental flow plans, whereby 24,000 megalitres (850 million cubic feet) of commonwealth water was allocated to the swamp in the year 2015–2016. This "environmental watering" was provided with the aim to contribute to "ecosystem functions such as nutrient cycling, support vegetation condition and the ability of the ecosystem to withstand drought and flood", therefore, protect and sustain the area.
