= Yanga National Park =

National park in New South Wales, Australia

- IUCN category II (national park)
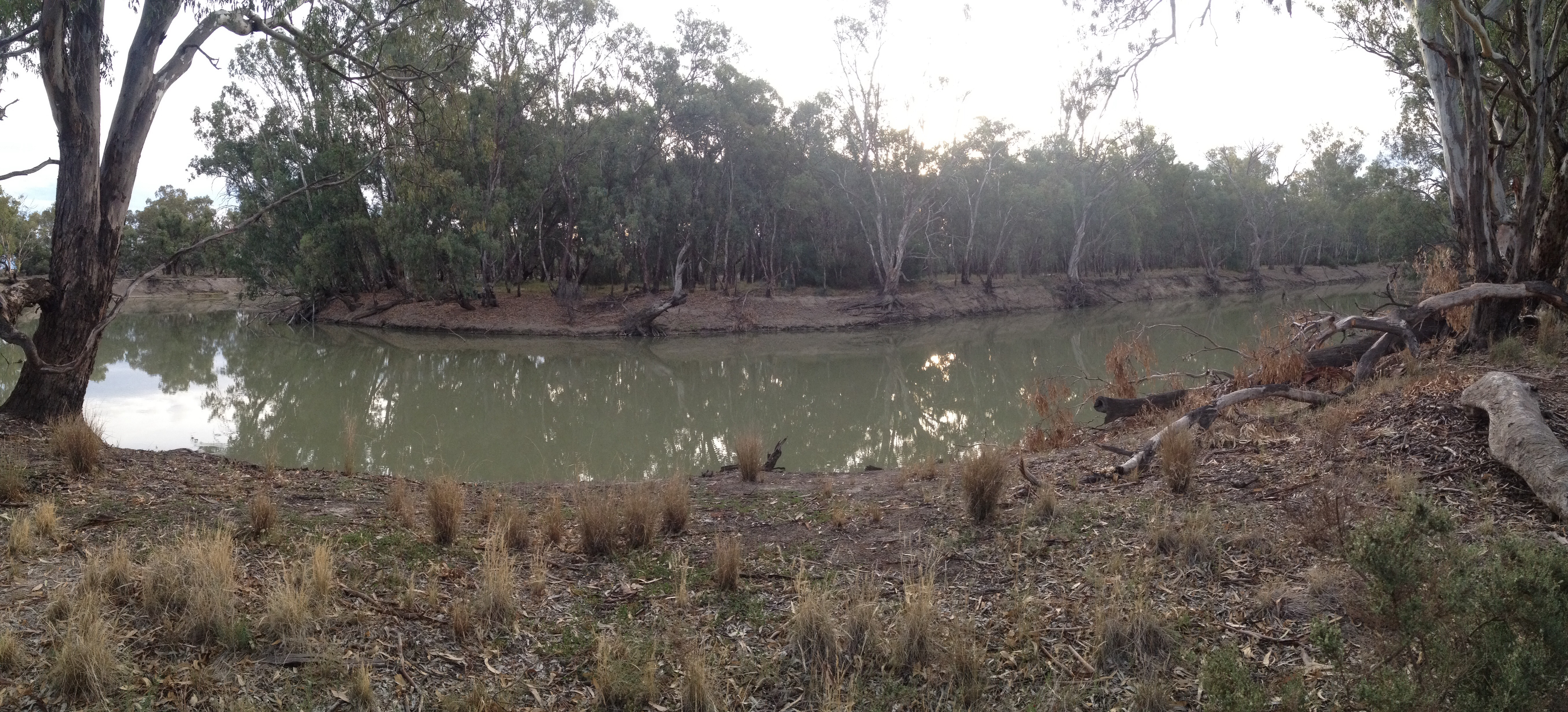
- Murrumbidgee River at the Mamanga campground

- Location within New South Wales
- Location: New South Wales
- Nearest city: Balranald
- Coordinates: 34°39′S 143°35′E
- Area: 66,734 ha (257.66 sq mi)
- Established: February 2007
- Governing body: NSW National Parks & Wildlife Service

The Yanga National Park is a newly formed national park, located near the township of Balranald in south- western New South Wales. It covers an area of 66,734 hectares (164,900 acres) which includes 1,932 hectares (4,770 acres) of Yanga Nature Reserve, and has a frontage of 170 kilometres (110 mi) on the Murrumbidgee River. It is largely located in the Lower Murrumbidgee Floodplain (or Lowbidgee Floodplain), which is included on A Directory of Important Wetlands in Australia because of its importance as a breeding site for waterbirds when flooded.

== History ==
=== Establishment ===
Yanga was formerly an important pastoral station established by William Wentworth, an explorer, in the 1830s, and later part of C. B. Fisher's pastoral empire. In July 2005, the New South Wales Government announced that it had purchased the station for the creation of a national park. The area was gazetted a national park on 28 February 2007, and also encompasses the 1,932-hectare (4,770-acre) Yanga Nature Reserve which was created in 1974 under the National Parks and Wildlife Act 1974 (NSW). The Yanga National Park is now part of the larger Murrumbidgee Valley National Park. The Murrumbidgee Valley National Park was created in 2010, with the park protecting part of what is now the largest continuous tract of river red gum forest in the world.

=== Aboriginal heritage ===
Yanga National Park lies within the traditional tribal areas the Muthi Muthi people. The NSW National Parks & Wildlife Service has recognised the importance of aboriginal sites to the aboriginal and broader community, so have developed an Aboriginal sites register covering the park. The register currently includes mounds, scarred trees, historic sites, burials and middens. The National Parks & Wildlife Service have a statutory role in the protection and preservation of Aboriginal sites.

=== European heritage ===
Yanga National Park is also an area of significance for early European settlement in the area. At the time, Yanga Station was the largest privately owned station in the southern hemisphere, covering 210,000 acres (85,000 ha). Yanga homestead was built around 1870, and still stands today. Before the property was purchased in 2005, the site was mostly freehold except for the 1,932 hectares (4,770 acres) of crown land of Yanga Nature Reserve. Prior to the purchase, the majority (over 90%) of the land was used for grazing.

== Climate ==
Climate in Yanga National Park is classified as warm persistently dry grassland based on a modified Köppen classification system. The area has a semi-arid climate with low rainfall, with average annual rainfall of approximately 320 millimetres (13 in) and hot summers, with high evaporation rates all year round.

== Ecology ==
=== Wetlands ===
The Yanga National Park incorporates 12 different wetland types according to the Ramsar Convention classification system, including inland wetlands and human- made wetlands. The national park includes four significant lakes (Yanga Lake, Tala Lake, Piggery Lake, Irrigation Lake), hundreds of waterways including canals and creeks, and extensive river red gum forest along the Murrumbidgee River.

Most of Yanga National Park located in the Lowbidgee Floodplain, which is considered to be of national environmental significance, and was listed as a Nationally Important Wetland within the Directory of Important Wetlands in 2000. It is one of the most significant wetland habitats for waterbirds in eastern Australia and has supported some of the largest waterbird breeding colonies in Australia and is home to the State’s largest known population of the endangered southern bell frog.

=== Flora ===
Seventeen vegetation classes have been identified in the Yanga National Park, with more than 300 plant species being recorded. River red gum forest/woodland, black box woodland, lignum/nitre goosefoot (Chenopodium nitrariaceum) shrubland, and spike rush (Eleocharis spp.) dominated sedgeland are identified as important vegetation classes in the area.

=== Fauna ===
The Yanga National Park and surrounding floodplain has provided an important refuge and habitat for a wide range of biodiversity including:

- 24 reptile species including geckos, goannas, dragons, skinks, snakes and turtles.
- 18 fish species, with European carp dominating most areas.
- 33 mammal species, including 7 introduced species (European red fox, red deer, feral cat, brown hare, rabbit, house mouse and the destructive feral pig).

==== Birds ====
Extensive bird studies and surveys have been undertaken in the area, but the number of birds recorded during a particular study has generally depended on the amount of water in the area during the study. A total of 64 waterbird species from 14 families have been recorded in the park.

There are 12 listed vulnerable species (under the Environment Protection and Biodiversity Conservation Act 1999) recorded within the Yanga National Park, and includes the Australasian bittern, freckled duck and blue-billed duck.

This area has been identified as one of the most significant wetland habitats for waterbirds in eastern Australia. Lignum floodways are a popular breeding habitat for a large range of waterbird species including ibis, and flooded areas of red gum forest provide habitat for nesting egrets, spoonbills and cormorants. Migratory species under the Japan–Australia Migratory Bird Agreement (JAMBA), the China–Australia Migratory Bird Agreement (CAMBA) and the Republic of Korea–Australia Migratory Bird Agreement (ROKAMBA) that have been recorded to regularly use wetlands within the Yanga National Park and surrounding areas include the Caspian tern, Latham’s snipe, cattle egret, and the black-tailed godwit.

==== Frogs ====
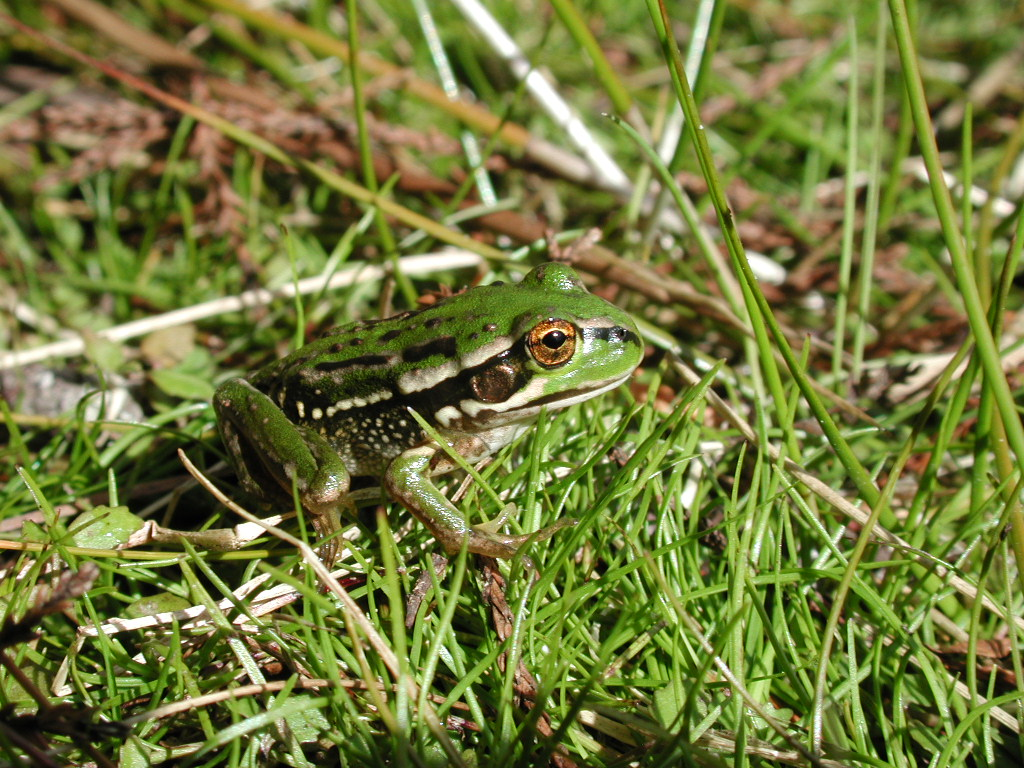
Southern bell frog (Litoria raniformis)

Limited historical information is available on frogs in Yanga National Park, but historical and recent surveys have recorded a total of 12 species of frogs from three families within the park. This includes the southern bell frog (Litoria raniformis) which is listed as endangered under the Threatened Species Conservation Act. The southern bell frog was once widespread and abundant throughout south-eastern Australia, but since the early 1980s its population and distribution have been reduced to a critical level. As there is limited historical and frog information from this area, it is not known when the southern bell frog populations began to decline within the area. However, it has been identified that the southern bell frog is vulnerable to habitat loss, fragmentation and degradation, altered flooding regimes, drought, predation by introduced fish and predation by other introduced species such as feral pigs and foxes.

== Environmental issues and threats ==
=== Alteration to the natural flow regimes ===
The major threat facing the condition of the wetlands in Yanga National Park is the alteration of natural flow regimes. There has been an overall reduction to flows to this area due to river regulation (dam and weir), water diversion, and alteration of flows within floodplains with levees and structures.

Changes to natural flow regime over the past 30 years has reduced wetland availability, has led to a decline in extent and condition of flood dependent vegetation, and has caused a reduction in flora and fauna that require specific flow regimes and water availability.

Waterbirds have specific requirements to commence and complete breeding, and changes to these conditions have led to decreases in the number of waterbirds recorded in the area. River regulation and the construction of levee banks to control floodwaters in the Nimmie-Caira system have reduced wetland availability by 60% (1975–1988) and caused total numbers of waterbirds to decline by 80% (1983–2000).

=== Habitat loss and fragmentation ===
Another major threat facing the condition of the wetlands in Yanga National Park is habitat loss and fragmentation. Much of this habitat loss is historical, due to the property being used for grazing, but has been exacerbated by changes to flow regime and loss of vegetation that traditionally relied on wetting.

Using historical floodplain maps and satellite imagery, Kingsford investigated floodplain loss in Lowbidgee from the turn of the 20th century. They found that 37,253 hectares (41%) of wetlands have been lost to developed land within the area. While the development of floodplains for agricultural production in Yanga National Park ceased in 2005 when the property was purchased by the government, there has still been an accelerated the loss and fragmentation of floodplain.

=== Introduced species ===
There have been 58 introduced plant species identified in Yanga National Park. The wide spread of introduced small ground plants reflects the agricultural history of the site. The prolonged dry period in water-plant dominated areas (i.e. shallow temporary swamps) and lake beds increases the risk of exotic plant invasion.

A number of surveys found that introduced fish species, in particular European carp (Cyprinus carpio), goldfish (Carassius auratus) and eastern gambusia (Gambusia holbrooki), dominate waterways within the park. Introduced fish species pose a threat to native fish species as predators, competitors, disease carriers and through modification of habitat and are thought to be a significant contributor to reductions in native fish species abundance in the Murrumbidgee catchment. Predation by European carp may also contribute to the decline in the southern bell frog population in Lowbidgee.

Other introduced animals of concern include feral pigs, cats and European red foxes. These animals prey on small native animals such as lizards, frogs and ground-nesting birds.

=== Other human impacts ===
Prior to the gazettal of the area as a national park in 2007, numerous land management practices occurred in Yanga National Park, including grazing, clearing, logging and burning. Although all these practices have been stopped, some of them have long lasting impacts on the ecological character of the site.

== Management and protection ==
=== Current protection in place ===
==== Environmental watering ====
Since the purchase of the property in 2005, more than 200,000 megalitres (44×10^{9} imp gal; 53×10^{9} US gal) of environmental water has been delivered to Yanga wetlands by both the Australian and NSW governments through the Rivers Environmental Restoration Program. The 2010-11 environmental water deliveries, which inundated some areas that have not received water since the late 1980s, including Yanga Lake and significant areas of threatened black box woodland. This has achieved outstanding broad scale benefits for the wetlands. The water has delivered benefits to wetland vegetation, black box woodland, river red gum forests and supported populations of the nationally threatened southern bell frog, and maintained nesting sites for many waterbird species.

==== Legislation ====
Since the gazettal of Yanga National Park in 2007, the area is now covered by the National Parks and Wildlife Act 1974 (NSW) and the National Parks and Wildlife Regulation 2009. The National Parks and Wildlife Act 1974 (NSW) is the legislation with the explicit intent of conserving their State's natural and cultural heritage; fostering public appreciation, understanding and enjoyment of their State's natural and cultural heritage; and managing any lands reserved for the purposes of conserving and fostering public appreciation and enjoyment of the State's natural and/or cultural heritage.

Every national park is covered by a plan of management and fire management strategies. Plans of management contain information on the natural environments, Aboriginal heritage, history, and recreational opportunities in a park. As Yanga National Park is relatively new, these specific documents are still under development.

=== Benefits of protection ===
Changed management practices and protection of the Yanga National Park has and will protect many flora and fauna species and ecological communities.

==== Supports ecological communities ====
There are two ecological communities within Yanga National Park which are listed as endangered under the New South Wales Threatened Species Conservation Act (1995), myall woodland and an aquatic ecological community in the natural drainage system of the lower Murray River catchment.

There is currently about 30 hectares of myall woodland in Yanga National Park located north of Yanga Lake. The community consists of low woodland, with a tree layer of mostly weeping myall or boree (Acacia pendula) as the dominant species. The understorey includes an open layer of chenopod shrubs and other woody plant species and an open to continuous groundcover of grasses and herbs. In the past land clearing and overgrazing by feral and domestic animals were the major threats to this ecological community within Yanga National Park. Since the purchase of the property in 2005, the threat of further land clearing has been diminished, however grazing by feral and domestic animals such as kangaroos and rabbits still poses a risk to the community.

The aquatic ecological community in the natural drainage system of the lower Murray River catchment includes all native fish and aquatic invertebrates within all natural creeks, rivers and associated lagoons, billabongs and lakes of the regulated portions of the Murray River below the Hume Weir, the Murrumbidgee River below Burrinjuck Dam, and the Tumut River below Blowering Dam, as well as all their tributaries and branches. In Yanga National Park, permanent and intermittent river channels, intermittent swamps, and billabongs make up components of this ecological community. The modification of natural river flows as a result of river regulation (dams, weirs) has been identified as the main threat to this ecological community. The changed river flow regimes lead to reduced habitat quality, loss of spawning cues, and reduced opportunities for dispersal and migration. Grazing also contributes to the degradation; however, the exclusion of livestock after gazettal as a national park should ease this pressure.

==== Supports threatened fauna species ====
Twenty- one endangered or vulnerable fauna have been recorded within Yanga National Park. The endangered species include three birds, one amphibian and one reptile, while the vulnerable species include 14 birds and two mammals. The loss, fragmentation and degradation of habitats were identified as major threats for a majority of the listed species. The gazettal of the national park in 2007 will lead to a decrease in the loss of appropriate habitats.

==== Supports an abundance of waterbirds ====
Yanga National Park and the surrounding Lowbidgee floodplain has been identified as a nationally important habitat for colonially-nesting waterbirds. This includes providing habitat for threatened species such as the Australasian bittern (Botaurus poiciloptilus), black-tailed godwit (Limosa limosa), blue-billed duck (Oxyura australis) and freckled duck (Stictonetta naevosa). This area has also been identified as an important area for migratory waterbird habitat in New South Wales. There are 11 migratory species covered by the international agreements for migratory birds (JAMBA, CAMBA, and ROKAMBA) recorded in Yanga National Park and adjacent areas.

Despite studies indicating that waterbird numbers have declined in this area, throughout Australia, and worldwide, the Lowbidgee floodplain and Yanga National Park still remains a significant breeding, feeding and nestling habitat contributing to sustaining the waterbird population, especially in inland Australia. Changes to management within the National Park area, including increased watering to this area and decreased destruction to wetland areas will provide ideal habitat for waterbirds into the future.

==== Supports threatened flora species ====
Two endangered and two vulnerable flora species have been recorded in Yanga National Park. Thirteen threatened plant species are known or predicted to occur in the lower Murrumbidgee region, such as lanky buttons (Leptorhynchos orientalis) and silky swainson-pea (Swainsona sericea). As there has been no systematic flora survey in Yanga National Park, more threatened flora species are likely to occur in the park.

== See also ==
- Protected areas of New South Wales
