= Lowbidgee Floodplain =

Part of the Murrumbidgee River floodplains, noted as important for birdlife conservation

Coordinates: 34°27′35″S 143°59′53″E

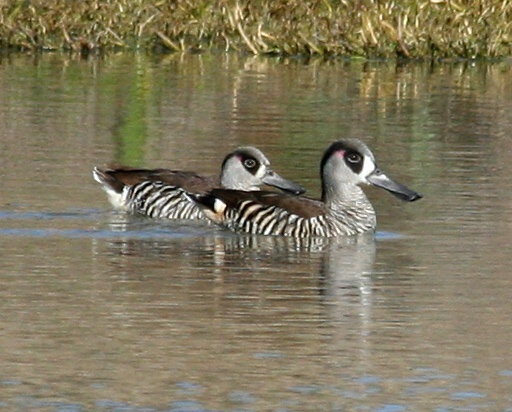
The floodplain is an important area for pink-eared ducks

The Lowbidgee Floodplain extends from Balranald to near Waradgery Station, about 20 km (12 mi) west of Hay, in south-western New South Wales, Australia. The Lowbidgee Floodplain is part of the Traditional lands of the Nari Nari and Muthi Muthi Aboriginal peoples.

It comprises an extensive (c. 2,000 km^{2} (770 sq mi)) floodplain of the lower Murrumbidgee River and its tributaries, including the confluence of the Murrumbidgee with the Lachlan River, with numerous swamps and lakes. The extent of the floodplain has been reduced in size from over 3,000 km^{2} (1,200 sq mi) at the beginning of the 20th century by the construction of dams, irrigation systems and other hydraulic engineering works, with the water inflow declining by at least 60% between 1888 and 1998. Apart from Yanga National Park (established in 2005 on the former Yanga Station) most of the floodplain consists of commercial irrigated farmland.

== Birds ==
A 1,908 km^{2} (737 sq mi) area of the floodplain, defined as the maximum area of contemporary flooding, has been identified by BirdLife International as an Important Bird Area (IBA) because it has supported up to 650,000 waterbirds during times of major flooding, and regularly supports over 1% of the world populations of black swans, freckled ducks, pink-eared ducks, grey teals, Australasian shovelers, straw-necked ibises, yellow-billed spoonbills and white-headed stilts. Other birds that have been recorded in large numbers include whiskered terns and Eurasian coots. Reduced inundation of the floodplain, through the construction of water management works, has resulted in waterbird numbers dropping by 90%, from an average of 140,000 in 1983-86 to 14,000 in 1998-2001.
