= Lake Brewster =

Wetland in Australia

Coordinates: 33.479°S 145.968°E

Lake Brewster is a wetlands area in New South Wales. The region is a major breeding site for Australian pelicans, and an important environmental area which functions as a water storage region for the Lachlan River. WaterNSW undertook emergency infrastructure repairs in 2023, due to flooding that had occurred late the previous year.
