= Lachlan River =

Intermittent river in New South Wales, Australia

Lachlan Deadmans Creek, Boorungullen Chain, Mutbilly Creek
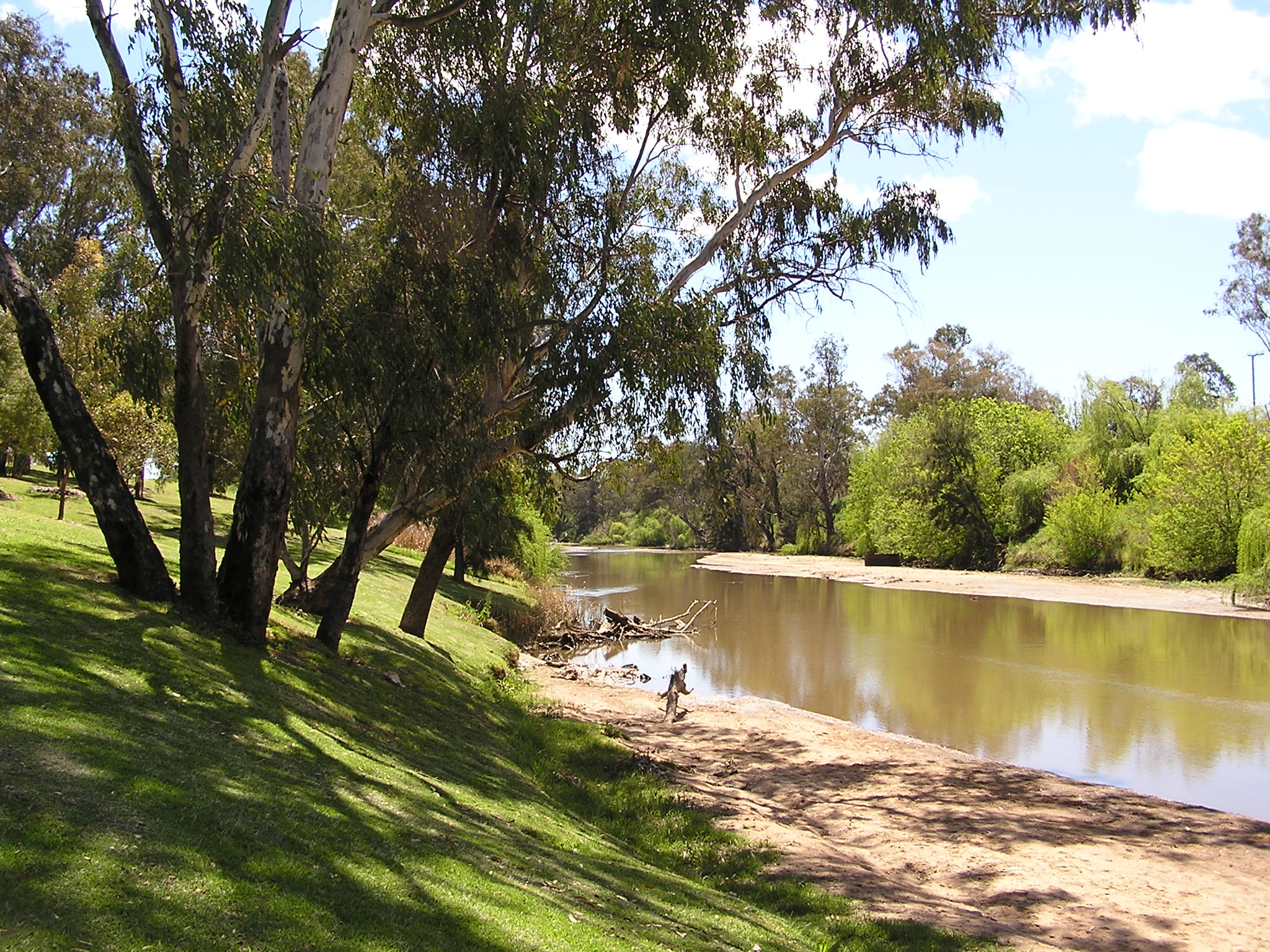
- The Lachlan River at Cowra

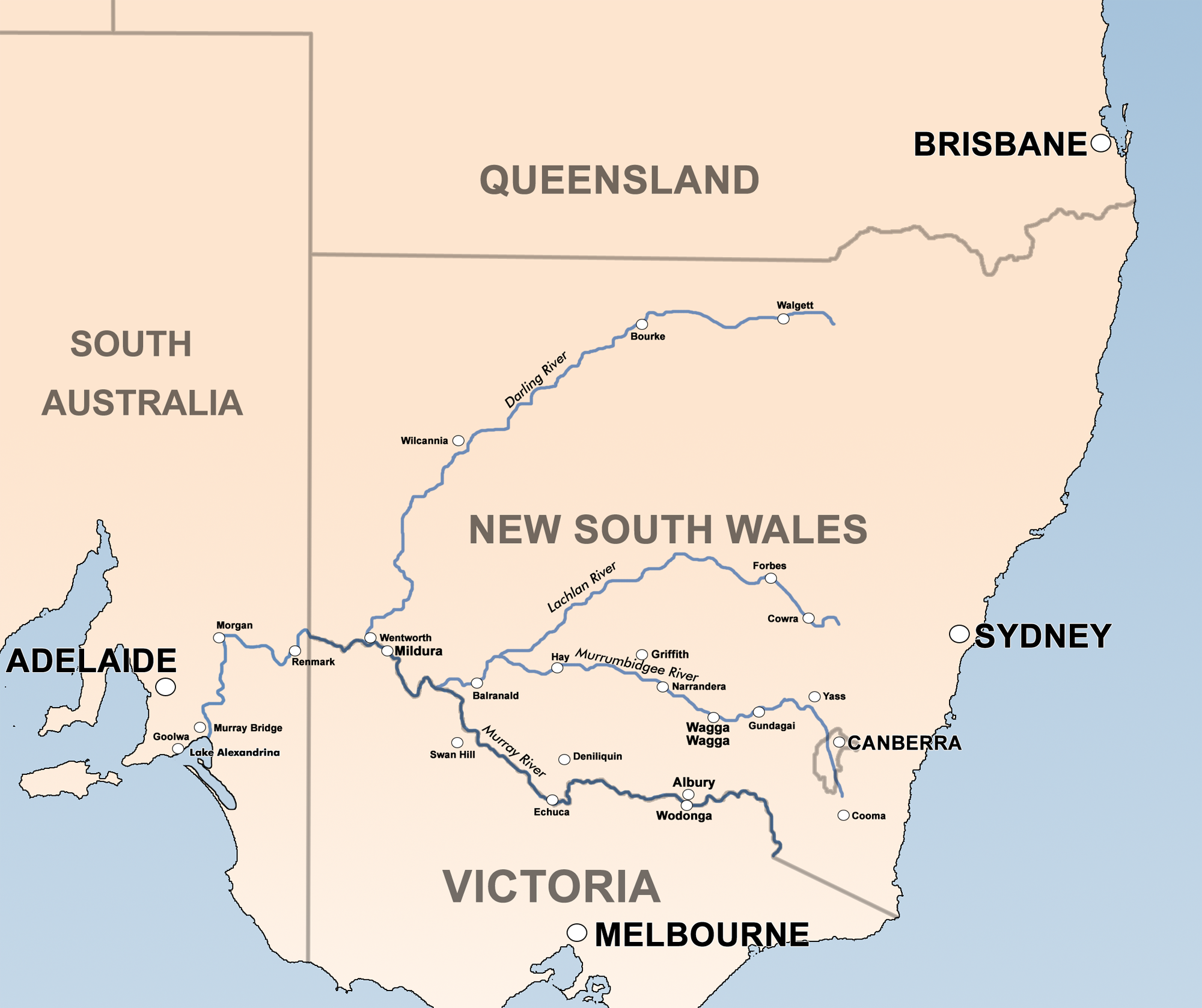
- Map of New South Wales, showing the Darling, Lachlan, Murrumbidgee and Murray rivers
- Etymology: In honour of Lachlan Macquarie
- Native name: Galiyarr, Kalari (Wiradjuri)

Location
- Country: Australia
- State: New South Wales
- Region: South Eastern Highlands, Riverina (IBRA), Southern Tablelands, Central West
- Local government areas: Upper Lachlan, Boorowa, Cowra, Weddin, Forbes, Lachlan
- Towns: Bevendale, Breadalbane, Reids Flat, Wyangala, Cowra, Gooloogong, Forbes, Euabalong, Condobolin, Lake Cargelligo, Hillston, Booligal, Oxley

Physical characteristics
- Source: Great Dividing Range
- Source confluence: Hannans Creek and Mutmutbilly Creek
  - location: east of Gunning
  - coordinates: 34°46′58″S 149°32′7″E
  - elevation: 699 m (2,293 ft)
- Mouth: Murrumbidgee River
  - location: near Oxley
  - coordinates: 34°22′S 143°47′E
  - elevation: 68 m (223 ft)
- Length: 1,440 km (890 mi)
- Basin size: 84,700 km^{2} (32,700 sq mi)
- Discharge
  - average: 49 m^{3}/s (1,700 cu ft/s)

Basin features
- River system: Murrumbidgee catchment, Murray–Darling basin
- Tributaries
  - left: Boorowa River
  - right: Crookwell River, Abercrombie River, Belubula River
- Dams: Wyangala Dam, Brewster Weir

The Lachlan River (Wiradjuri: Kalari, Galari, Galiyarr) is an intermittent river that is part of the Murrumbidgee catchment within the Murray–Darling basin, located in the Southern Tablelands, Central West, and Riverina regions of New South Wales, Australia.

The Lachlan River is connected to the Murray–Darling basin only when both the Lachlan and Murrumbidgee Rivers are in flood. It is the only river in New South Wales with significant wetlands along its length, rather than just towards its end, including Lake Cowal-Wilbertroy, Lake Cargelligo and Lake Brewster, and nine wetlands of national significance.

== Course ==
The river rises on the western slopes of the Great Dividing Range in the Southern Tablelands district of New South Wales, formed by the confluence of Hannans Creek and Mutmutbilly Creek, 13 kilometres (8.1 mi) east of Gunning, and 26 kilometres (16 mi) west of Goulburn. The river flows generally north-west, north, west and south-west, joined by thirty-seven tributaries including the Crookwell, Abercrombie, Boorowa, and Belubula rivers before terminating near Oxley in the 500-square-kilometre (190 sq mi) Great Cumbung swamp that joins the Murrumbidgee River to the south and becomes part of the Lowbidgee Floodplain. The river descends 632 metres (2,073 ft) over its 1,440-kilometre (890 mi) course.

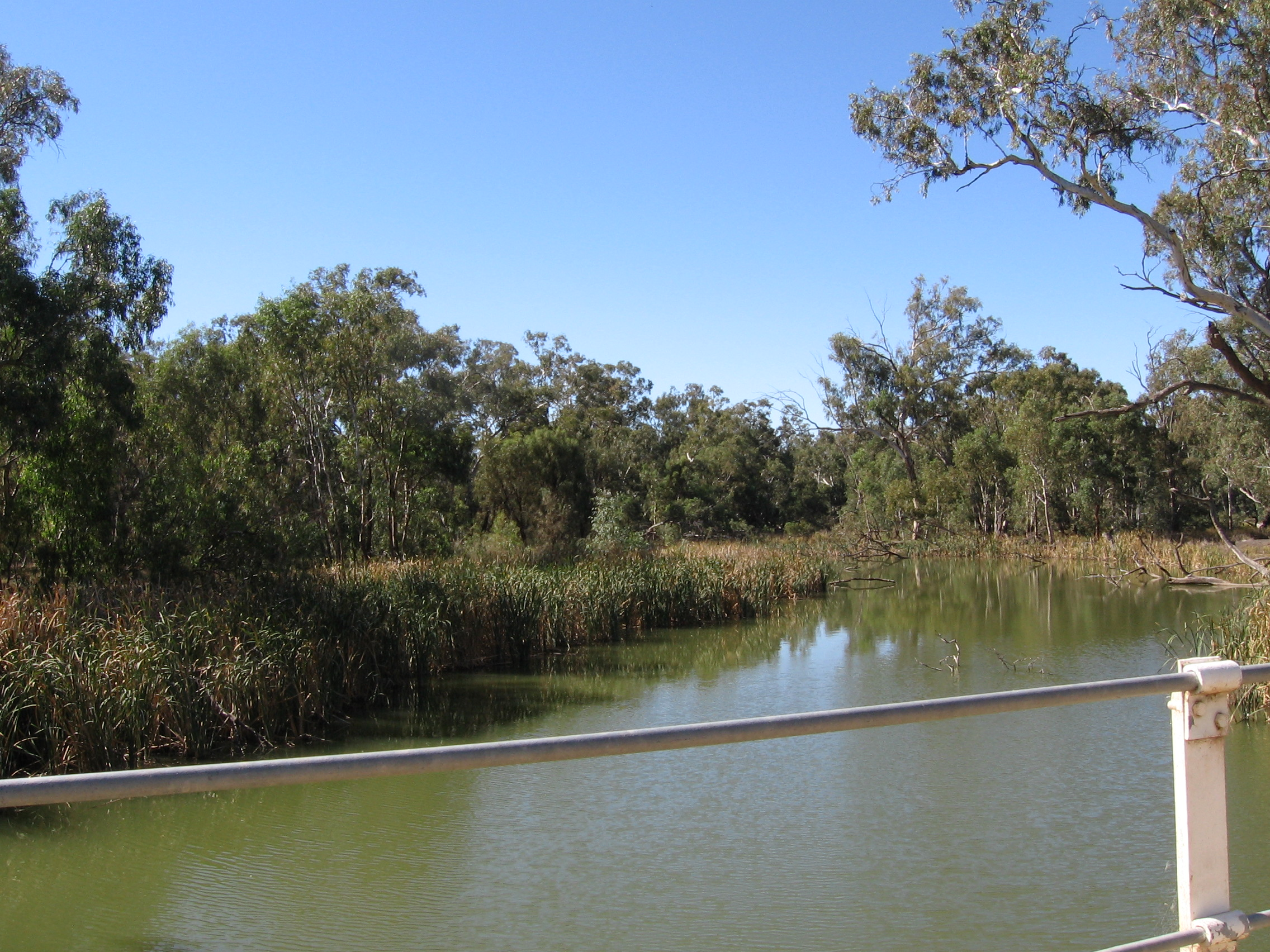
The Lachlan River at Oxley

The river is impounded by Wyangala Dam, near Cowra and Brewster Weir, located between Lake Cargelligo and Hillston; and passes through the towns of Breadalbane, Reids Flat, Wyangala, Cowra, Gooloogong, Forbes, Euabalong, Condobolin, Lake Cargelligo, Hillston, Booligal, and Oxley.

The annual flow of the Lachlan is erratic. Annual flows have ranged from less than 1,000 megalitres (35×10^{6} cu ft) in 1944 to as much as 10,900 megalitres (380×10^{6} cu ft) in 1950. In dry years, the Lachlan can have periods of zero flow of over a year (for example from April 1944 to April 1945), in contrast to the Murray and Murrumbidgee, which have not been known to stop flowing since European settlement. The river has flooded every seven years since 1887 at Forbes.

The social-ecological systems of the Lachlan River and its catchment include its upper tablelands, mixed farming slopes, through to plains, rangelands, and then lower floodplains. More than 100,000 people live in the Lachlan catchment. It is estimated that 12% of the state's agricultural businesses are located from within the Lachlan River catchment.

== History ==
The Lachlan River is located in the traditional homelands of the Wiradjuri Aboriginal people. The Wiradjuri lived along the Macquarie, Lachlan and Murrumbidgee Rivers, in the area known as "the land of the three rivers".

Acting-Surveyor George William Evans visited the river in 1815, naming it the Lachlan River after Lachlan Macquarie, the governor of the colony of New South Wales. The Lachlan River was substantially explored by John Oxley in 1817. In the early days of colonial New South Wales, the southern part of the Lachlan was known as Fish River. It was only after further exploration that it was realised that these two rivers were the same river and the name Fish River was dropped.

The explorer and naturalist, James H B Shaw, was one of the first Europeans to write about the birds and habitat along the Lachlan River. His article appeared in the Australian Town and Country Journal in 1885.

== Flooding ==
In 1870 the river peaked at 15.9 metres (52 ft) at Cowra. Since 1887, the highest flood level at Forbes was in June 1952 when the river peaked at 10.8 metres (35 ft) at the Forbes Iron Bridge. More than 900 families were evacuated, with many rescued from roof-tops by boat and helicopter. During the flood in August 1990, 132 houses in Forbes were affected by flood with their yards or their floors covered by water. Floods in 1992 did not reach the same levels at Forbes as in 1990, however, Lachlan Valley farmers lost about 30 percent of their lucerne crops just before harvest. At least 500 sheep were drowned on properties in the Eugowra/Trundle area and most of Eugowra's 400 residents were evacuated and some residents from Trundle. Other significant years of floods were: 1891, 1916, 1951, 1956, 1961, 1974, 1976, 1993, 1998, 2012, 2016 and 2021.

== In literature ==
The Lachlan River is mentioned in the Banjo Paterson poem Clancy of the Overflow as well as the folk song Streets of Forbes.

== See also ==
- List of rivers of New South Wales (L–Z)
- List of rivers of Australia
