= Oxley, New South Wales =

Oxley
- Town
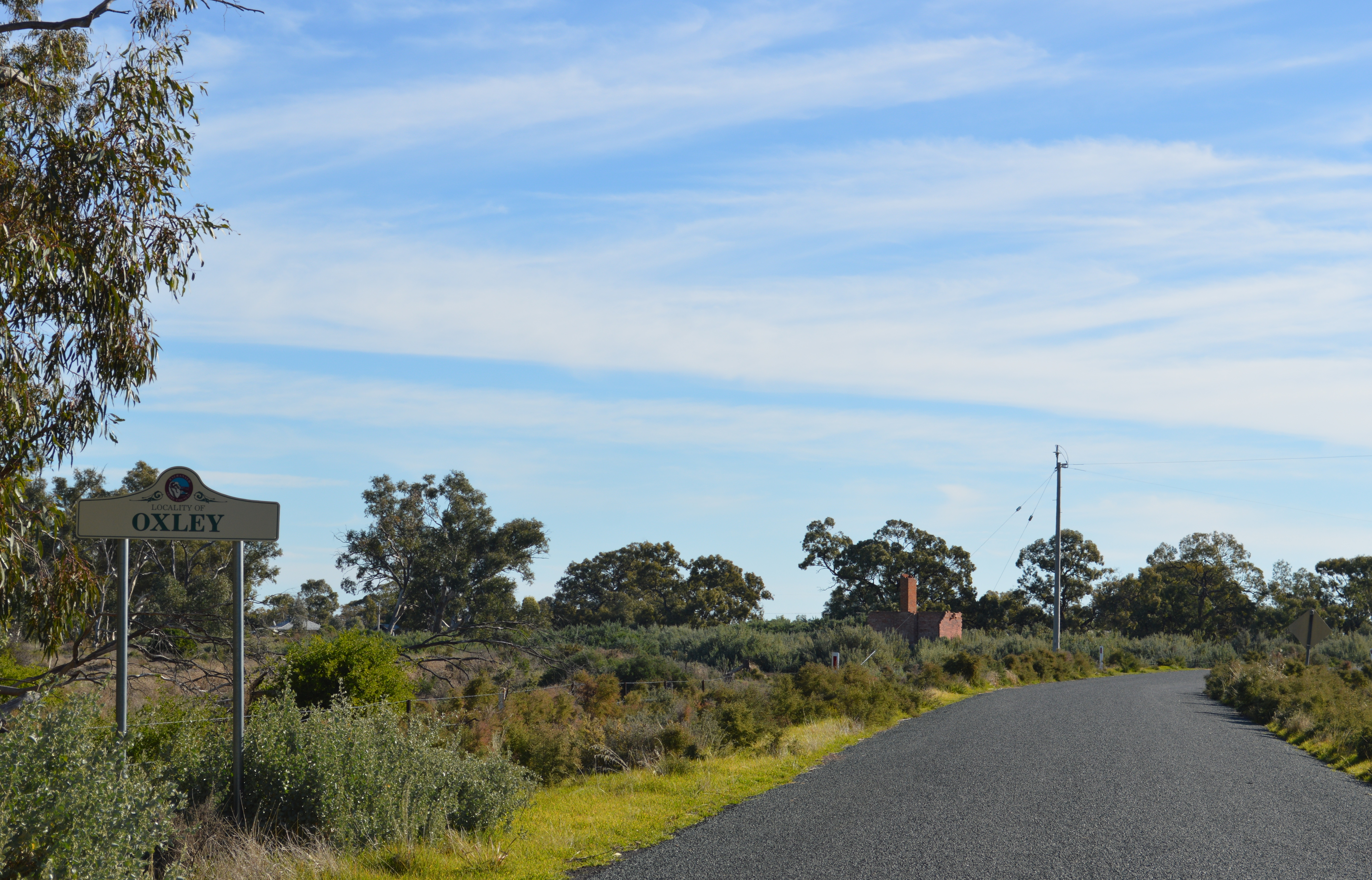
- Entry sign

- Coordinates: 34°10′S 144°06′E
- Country: Australia
- State: New South Wales
- LGA: Balranald Shire

Government
  - State electorate: Murray
  - Federal division: Farrer

Population
  - Total: 159 (2006 census)
- Postcode: 2711
- County: Waljeers

Oxley is a community on the lower Lachlan River in the Riverina district of New South Wales, Australia near the junction of the Lachlan and Murrumbidgee Rivers. The township which developed in the mid-1860s was named after the noted Australian explorer, John Oxley. At the 2006 census, Oxley had a population of 159 people.

== History ==
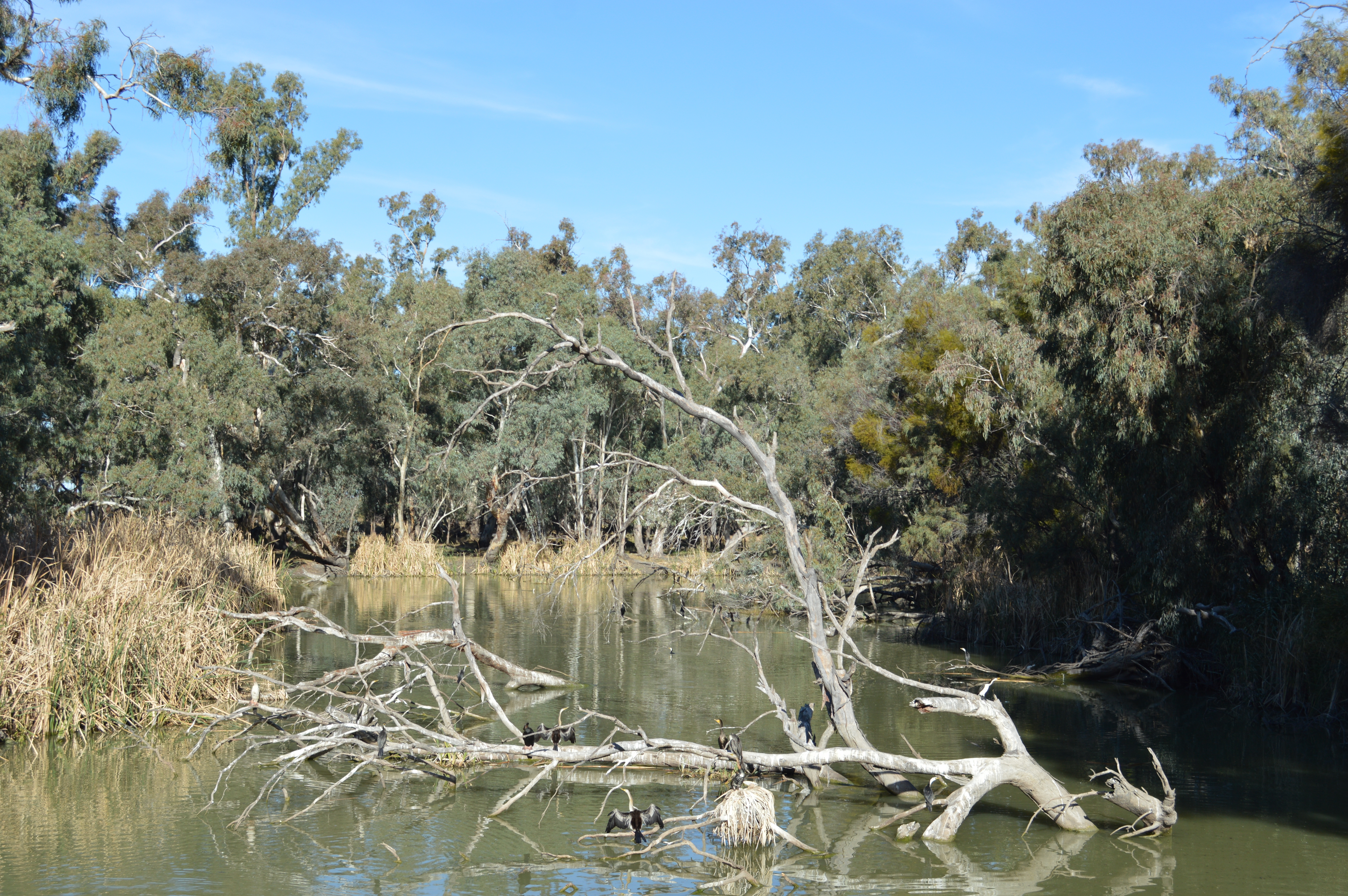
The Lachlan River at Oxley.

=== Aboriginal History ===
Oxley is part of the traditional lands of the Muthi Muthi Aboriginal tribe. In 1836 explorer Major Mitchell took Muthi Muthi woman Tourandury and her 4-year-old daughter Ballandella from Oxley as guides through the land. Tourandury was also part of a group of Aborigines who met with explorer Charles Sturt and helped him when his whale boat capsized on the nearby Murrumbidgee river. Ballandella was removed from her mother and taken to Sydney to be educated by Mitchell and his friend Dr Nicholson. Queen Caroline of Oxley and her sister Judy are apical ancestors of many surviving Muthi Muthi people today.

=== "Oxley" and "Tupra" stations ===
In about the mid-1840s Phelps and Chadwick took up a run on the lower Lachlan which they called "Thelangerin West". In 1848 the lease was purchased by Thomas D'Archy who renamed the run "Oxley", and called the station homestead "Oxley House".

Opposite the "Oxley" run on the north bank of the Lachlan River was the "Tupra" run, held by the Tyson brothers since the 1840s. By the 1860s it was held solely by James Tyson.

=== Oxley township ===
In the mid-1860s the squatter James Tyson saw a business opportunity and built a hotel at a new township which was developing at a crossing-place over the river on his "Tupra" run. A report in the Pastoral Times newspaper in November 1866 stated that "Mr. Tyson has built a brick hotel" which was to be opened shortly at the "new township of Oxley". The report added: "There is not much traffic past the house, and very few men in the neighborhood, so the prospects of doing a good trade are not very encouraging".

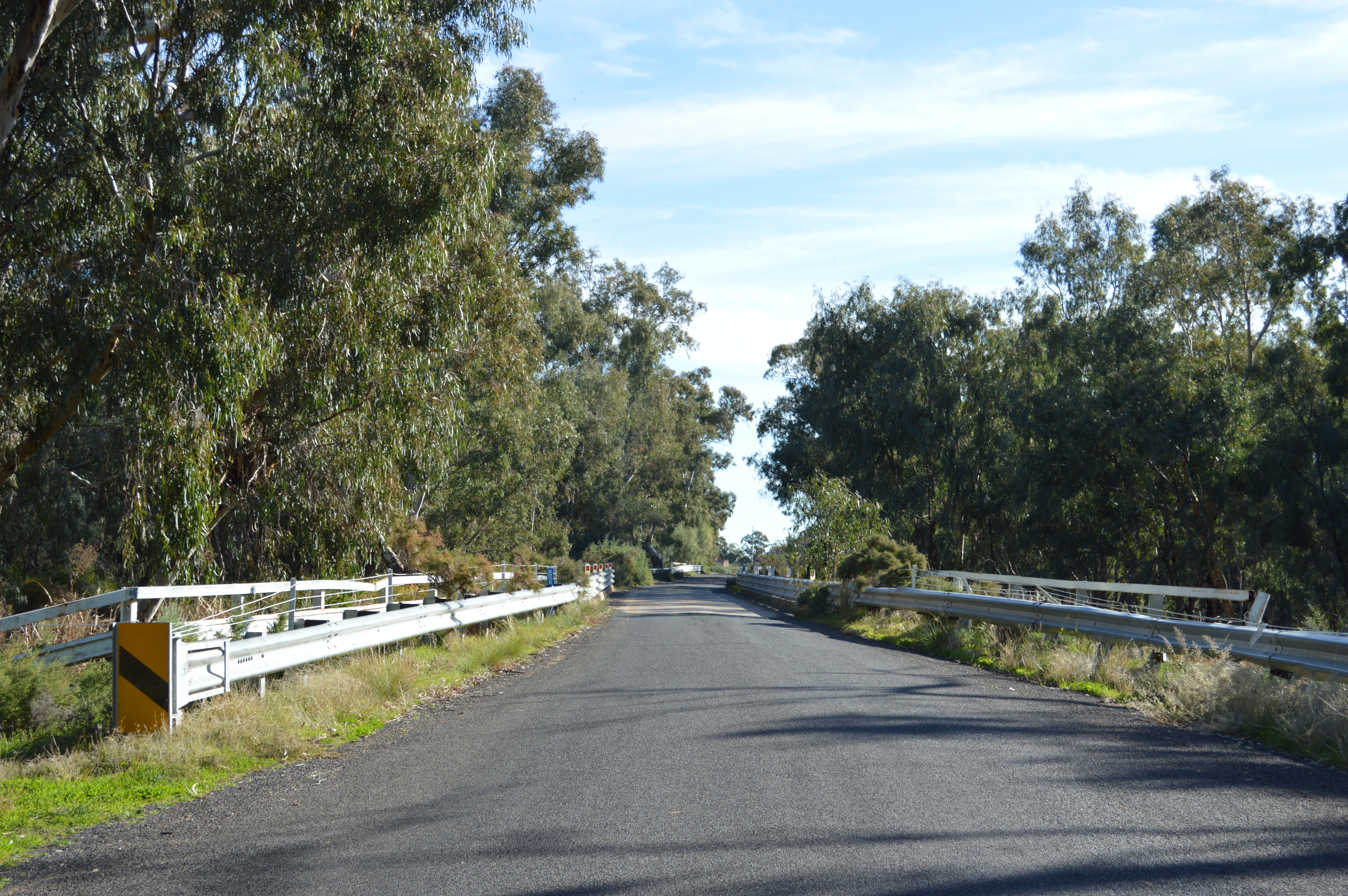
Bridge over the Lachlan River

In December 1866 it was reported that a petition was to be sent to Government "to place a sum of money on the estimates to build a bridge at a point of the Lachlan River, about eight miles above the government township of Oxley, which is opposite Mr. D'Archy's station". The report added that "there is a boat there at present, which is a great convenience to persons travelling".

A Government land-sale, which included lots at Oxley township, was held at Hay on 9 March 1868.

Tyson's brick hotel was called the Oxley Hotel; during 1869 Thomas Donahee was recorded as the licensee. In April 1870 at the Hay Police Court Daniel Murphy, "formerly of Maude", applied for a licence for the Oxley Hotel (which was subsequently granted). In December 1870 George Carter was successful in his application for a licence for a second public-house at Oxley, called the Stockman's Hotel.

George Carter remained publican of the Stockman's Hotel at Oxley until 1872 when he apparently closed his establishment to carry on the nearby Paika Creek Hotel at Paika Creek. The Oxley Hotel was once again the sole public-house at the township; Daniel Murphy remained publican until 1874.

In June 1874 the publican's licence for the Oxley Hotel was transferred from Daniel Murphy to John Murphy. The ownership of the Oxley Hotel apparently remained in the hands of James Tyson (with the various publicans leasing the hotel). In January 1875 advertisements were placed in the Riverine Grazier newspaper by Tyson's nephew, James Tyson Jnr., seeking a "respectable tenant" for the Oxley Hotel. A month later it was reported that John Murphy's licence for the Oxley Hotel was to be transferred to Mr. Robert Jackson. Jackson was the publican of the Oxley Hotel during 1875 to 1877.

In 1878 Michael Joseph Delandre took over the licence. Delandre had previously been a policeman, stationed at Maude. A traveller to Oxley in early 1879 reported that "Mr. Delandre… runs a hotel business with a little storekeeping combined". The Oxley Hotel was described as "one of the most comfortable and cleanly roadside houses I have met with; the building is substantial and commodious". The writer reported that Delandre "with an eye to business, is constructing a pontoon bridge, which he intends laying across the river in front of his house". He added: "In his undertaking [Delandre] deserves support and success, for the bridge will be a great boon to travelling stock, and also to the passengers from Hay to Balranald, as Messrs. Cobb and Co. will run coaches between those towns as soon as the bridge is completed, whereas at present the mails are carried on horseback".

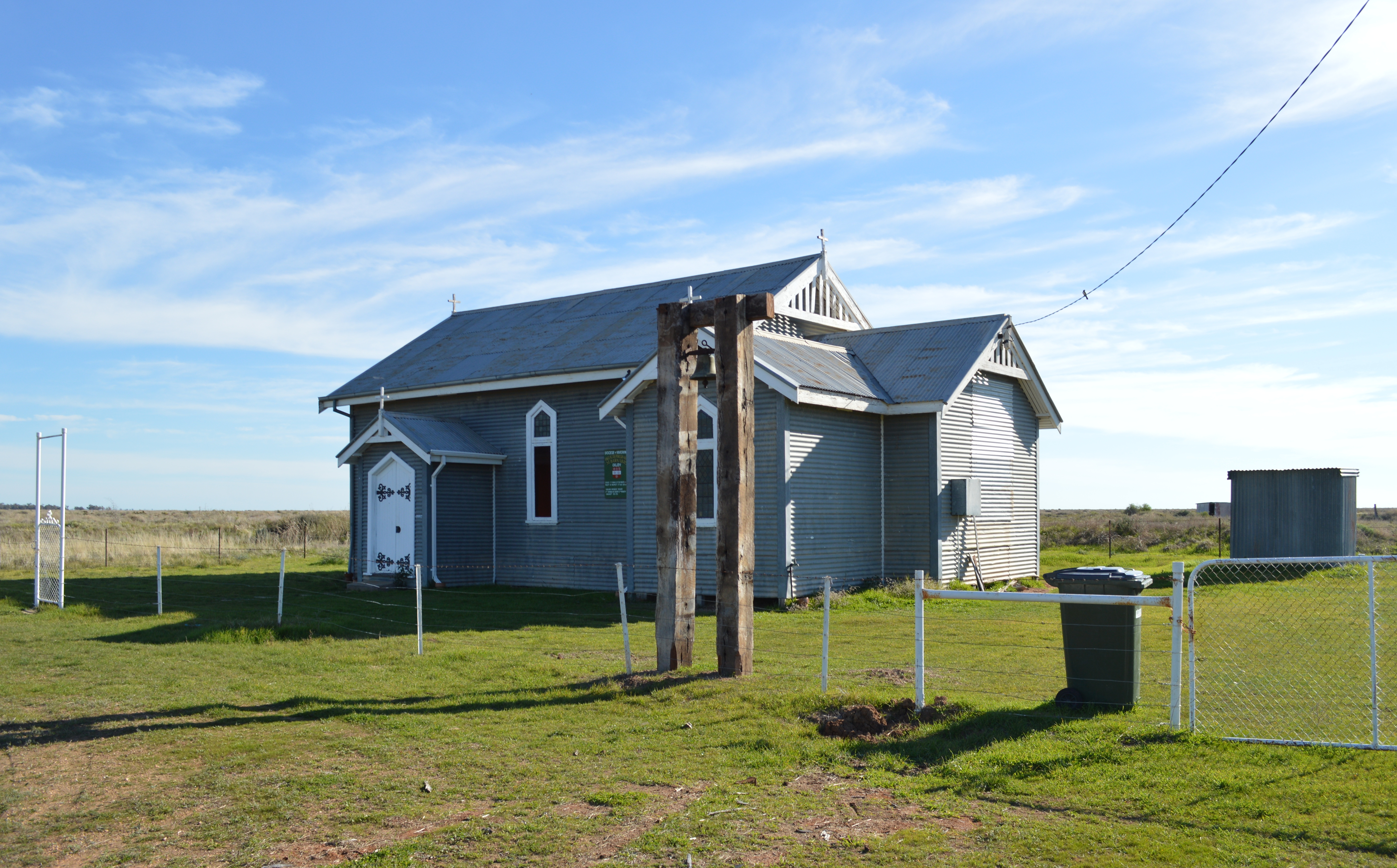
St Barnabas Anglican Church, Oxley

Just two years later another traveller who arrived at Oxley on the mail-coach described Delandre's pontoon-bridge as "a wretched apology for a bridge, in the shape of a pontoon, the condition of which seems to be verging upon the last stages of dissolution".

In 1881 Oxley township once again had two hotels when the Royal Hotel was opened with John Westhead as the publican. In 1882 there was a re-shuffle of publicans as Delandre left the Oxley Hotel to be replaced by William Westhead, and Daniel Murphy took over the licence of the Royal.

Oxley Post Office opened on 1 November 1884 and closed in 1969.

In about 1888 the Royal Hotel had ceased trading at Oxley. In 1889 a licence was granted to Thompson S. Page for a new public-house at the township, the Commercial Hotel (possibly a name-change of the old Royal Hotel premises). In 1889 the publican of the Oxley Hotel was John Parr.

In 1890 "Oxley" station was purchased by the A.M.L.&F. Company. R. P. McFarland purchased "Oxley" station in 1912.
