= Euabalong =

Euabalong New South Wales
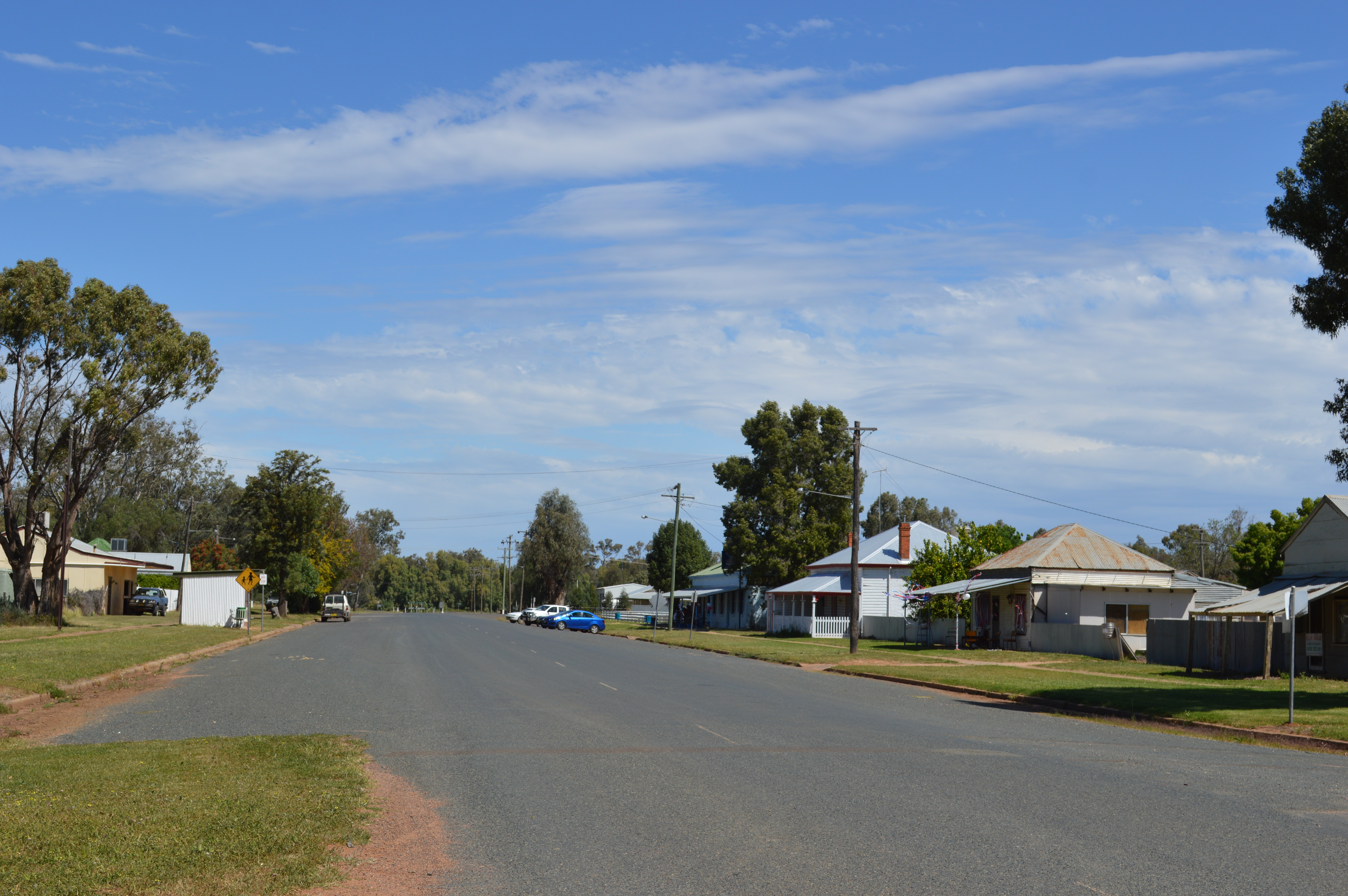
- Lachlan Street, the main street of Euabalong

- Coordinates: 33°06′37″S 146°28′11″E
- Population: 125 (SAL 2021)
- Postcode(s): 2877
- Location: 531 km (330 mi) W of Sydney; 162 km (101 mi) N of Griffith; 69 km (43 mi) W of Condobolin
- LGA(s): Cobar Shire
- State electorate(s): Barwon
- Federal division(s): Parkes

Euabalong is a town in western New South Wales, Australia. The town is in the Cobar Shire local government area and on the Lachlan River, 531 kilometres (330 mi) west of the state capital, Sydney, and 27 kilometres from Lake Cargelligo.

The town is served by a railway station on the Broken Hill railway line at nearby Euabalong West.

== History ==
The town was surveyed by 1873 and town lots were sold in October that year. A visitor to Euabalong in 1877 described it as "a most forsaken and deserted looking hole" but did note that "business is said to be pretty brisk there" and that the drinkers were "more refined" than those at Condobolin upstream. At that time, the primary buildings in the town were "two public houses, a blacksmith's establishment, a newly-built edifice intended for a public house, and a rather expensively-constructed store". The Lachlan River at Euabalong has also been known to flood or flow very high over the years when the river has flooded in other areas like Forbes and Condobolin.

== Demography ==
At the 2016 census, Euabalong had a population of 188. This had dropped to 125 in the 2021 census.
