= Nicholson County =

Nicholson
- Cadastral division
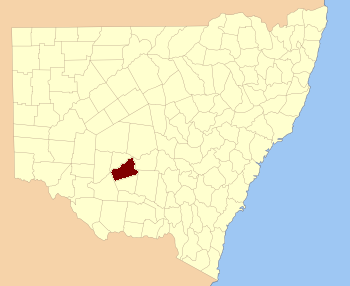
- Location in New South Wales
- Country: Australia
- State: New South Wales
Lands administrative divisions around Nicholson
| Franklin | Franklin | Blaxland |
| Waljeers | Nicholson | Dowling |
| Waradgery | Sturt | Cooper |

Nicholson County is one of the 141 cadastral divisions of New South Wales. It contains the towns of Hillston, Goolgowi, Gunbar, Merriwagga, Goorawin and Langtree. The Lachlan River is its north-western boundary.

Nicholson County is named in honour of the statesman, Sir Charles Nicholson (1808–1903).

== Parishes within this county ==
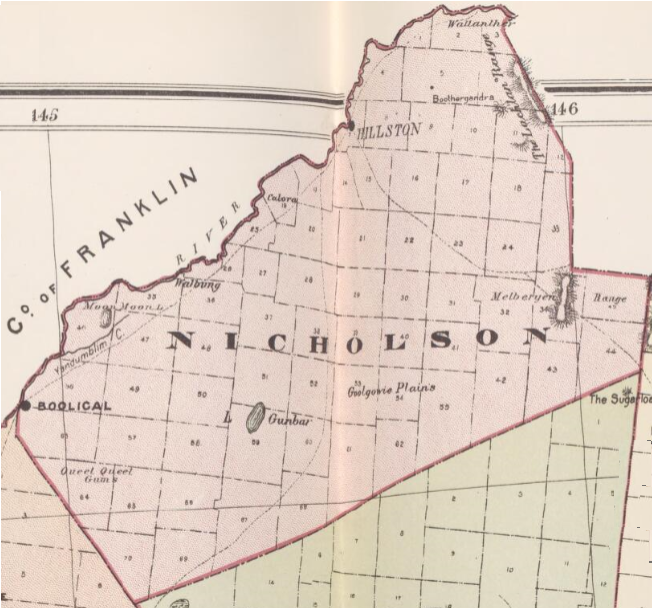
Nicholson County NSW as shown on John Sands 1886 map)

A full list of parishes found within this county; their current LGA and mapping coordinates to the approximate centre of each location is as follows:

| Parish | LGA | Coordinates |
|---|---|---|
| Amoilla North | Carrathool Shire Council | 33°53′54″S 145°12′04″E |
| Amoilla | Hay Shire Council | 34°06′54″S 145°10′04″E |
| Beaconsfield | Carrathool Shire Council | 33°59′54″S 145°30′04″E |
| Belaley | Carrathool Shire Council | 34°01′54″S 145°11′04″E |
| Bellingerambil East | Carrathool Shire Council | 33°29′54″S 145°43′04″E |
| Bellingerambil South | Carrathool Shire Council | 33°35′54″S 145°39′04″E |
| Bellingerambil | Carrathool Shire Council | 33°29′54″S 145°38′04″E |
| Berangerine | Carrathool Shire Council | 34°03′54″S 145°17′04″E |
| Bogia | Carrathool Shire Council | 33°37′54″S 145°51′04″E |
| Bolton | Carrathool Shire Council | 33°58′54″S 149°40′04″E |
| Booligal | Hay Shire Council | 33°52′54″S 144°56′04″E |
| Bootheragandra | Carrathool Shire Council | 33°32′54″S 145°51′04″E |
| Bouyaree | Carrathool Shire Council | 33°44′54″S 145°11′04″E |
| Bowerabine | Carrathool Shire Council | 34°00′54″S 145°19′04″E |
| Bulgura | Hay Shire Council | 34°01′54″S 145°01′04″E |
| Bunda East | Carrathool Shire Council | 33°42′54″S 145°51′04″E |
| Bunda North | Carrathool Shire Council | 33°36′54″S 145°45′04″E |
| Bunda | Carrathool Shire Council | 33°41′54″S 145°46′04″E |
| Burgess | Carrathool Shire Council | 33°44′54″S 145°30′04″E |
| Caninganima | Carrathool Shire Council | 33°37′54″S 145°20′04″E |
| Carilla | Carrathool Shire Council | 33°27′54″S 145°51′04″E |
| Chirnside | Carrathool Shire Council | 33°49′54″S 145°24′04″E |
| Coowerrawine | Carrathool Shire Council | 33°59′54″S 145°07′04″E |
| East Marowie | Carrathool Shire Council | 33°26′54″S 145°44′04″E |
| Elliott | Carrathool Shire Council | 33°54′54″S 145°37′04″E |
| Eurella | Carrathool Shire Council | 33°59′54″S 145°13′04″E |
| Eurugabah | Hay Shire Council | 34°02′54″S 145°05′04″E |
| Fox | Carrathool Shire Council | 33°46′54″S 145°57′04″E |
| Gonowlia | Carrathool Shire Council | 34°00′54″S 145°26′04″E |
| Goolgowi South | Carrathool Shire Council | 33°54′15″S 145°49′11″E |
| Goolgowi West | Carrathool Shire Council | 33°43′54″S 145°45′04″E |
| Goolgowi | Carrathool Shire Council | 33°43′54″S 145°51′04″E |
| Griffiths | Carrathool Shire Council | 33°50′43″S 145°36′45″E |
| Honuna North | Hay Shire Council | 33°49′54″S 145°12′04″E |
| Honuna | Carrathool Shire Council | 34°02′54″S 145°23′04″E |
| Hopwood | Carrathool Shire Council | 33°48′54″S 145°19′04″E |
| Huntawong | Carrathool Shire Council | 33°23′54″S 145°40′04″E |
| Ivanhoe | Carrathool Shire Council | 33°43′54″S 145°38′04″E |
| Lachlan | Carrathool Shire Council | 33°39′54″S 145°55′04″E |
| Lake Gunbar | Carrathool Shire Council | 33°53′54″S 145°19′04″E |
| Langtree | Carrathool Shire Council | 33°33′54″S 145°30′04″E |
| Loughnan | Carrathool Shire Council | 33°29′54″S 145°46′04″E |
| Mea Mia North | Carrathool Shire Council | 33°42′54″S 145°13′04″E |
| Mea Mia South | Carrathool Shire Council | 33°44′54″S 145°24′04″E |
| Mea Mia | Carrathool Shire Council | 33°43′54″S 145°18′04″E |
| Melbergen South | Carrathool Shire Council | 33°50′54″S 145°59′04″E |
| Melbergen | Carrathool Shire Council | 33°43′54″S 145°59′04″E |
| Molesworth | Carrathool Shire Council | 33°39′54″S 145°30′04″E |
| Moncton | Carrathool Shire Council | 33°49′54″S 145°30′04″E |
| Moon Moon | Hay Shire Council | 33°44′54″S 145°06′04″E |
| Mulla Mulla | Hay Shire Council | 33°48′54″S 145°05′04″E |
| Mullion | Carrathool Shire Council | 33°39′54″S 145°25′04″E |
| Naradhun | Carrathool Shire Council | 33°34′54″S 145°28′04″E |
| Neobine | Hay Shire Council | 33°52′54″S 145°05′04″E |
| Parker | Carrathool Shire Council | 33°41′54″S 145°39′04″E |
| Redbank | Carrathool Shire Council | 33°29′54″S 145°33′04″E |
| Russell | Carrathool Shire Council | 33°53′54″S 145°24′04″E |
| South Marowie | Carrathool Shire Council | 33°26′54″S 145°36′04″E |
| Stackpoole | Carrathool Shire Council | 33°50′54″S 145°52′04″E |
| Synnot | Carrathool Shire Council | 33°54′54″S 145°30′04″E |
| Tambalana | Hay Shire Council | 33°56′54″S 144°56′04″E |
| Townsend | Carrathool Shire Council | 33°32′54″S 145°55′04″E |
| Wallanthery | Carrathool Shire Council | 33°23′54″S 145°50′04″E |
| Warrabalong | Carrathool Shire Council | 33°59′54″S 145°36′04″E |
| Weenya | Carrathool Shire Council | 33°22′54″S 145°45′04″E |
| Weepool | Carrathool Shire Council | 33°34′54″S 145°24′04″E |
| Weerie | Carrathool Shire Council | 33°51′54″S 145°42′04″E |
| Whealbah South | Carrathool Shire Council | 33°39′54″S 145°17′04″E |
| Yandumblin | Hay Shire Council | 33°47′54″S 144°59′04″E |
| Yurdyilla | Hay Shire Council | 34°05′54″S 145°04′04″E |
