= Gunbar, New South Wales =

Gunbar
- Town
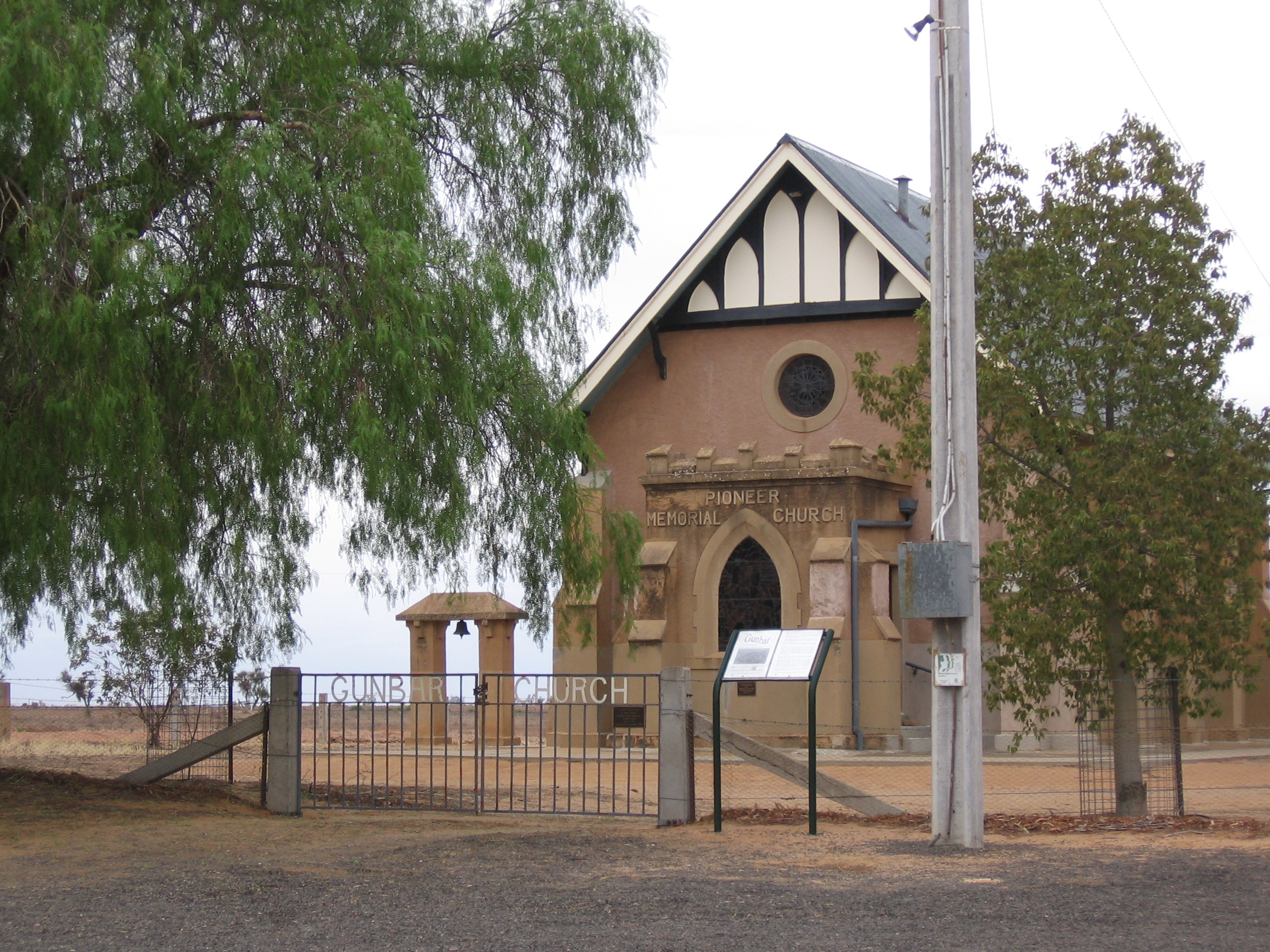
- Presbyterian church

- Coordinates: 34°03′S 145°23′E
- Country: Australia
- State: New South Wales
- LGA: Carrathool Shire
- Location: 34 km (21 mi) from Googowi; 79 km (49 mi) from Hay

Government
  - State electorate: Murray
  - Federal division: Farrer
- Elevation: 95 m (312 ft)

Population
  - Total: 97 (2006 census)
- Postcode: 2711
- County: Nicholson

Gunbar is in the Riverina district of south-western New South Wales in Australia, on a wide bend of the Mid-Western Highway between Goolgowi and Hay. It is part of the Carrathool Shire local government area, administered from Goolgowi. At the 2006 census, Gunbar had a population of 97 people.

In its heyday Gunbar was a village which served as the hub of the surrounding pastoral properties and the community of selectors that had settled in the district from the 1870s onwards. Nowadays the Gunbar community consists of those who live and work on district farming properties. The Presbyterian church, still used for worship, stands on an elevated position overlooking the original village-site, where the corrugated-iron Community Hall is the only other major building that remains. Scattered peppercorn trees give further evidence of the village that once stood there. Gunbar cemetery is located just over a mile away, nearby to the site of the old government-surveyed township (NNE of the original village).

== History ==
=== 'Gunbar' station ===
The land later known as "Gunbar" station was first occupied by Europeans during the expansion by squatters along the Lachlan River in 1839 and the early 1840s. By the early 1870s "Gunbar" and other surrounding runs were held by the partnership of G. Kirk, John Bramwell and Albert Synnot. The name "Gunbar" is said to be an Aboriginal word meaning "no meat". In 1875, after Albert Synnot's death, the "Gunbar" lease was transferred to G. Kirk and D. B. Reid. In 1876 "Gunbar" station was held by W. Cumming & Co., with John Armstrong as manager. "Gunbar" comprised an area of at least 380,000 acres (1,500 km^{2}) during this period. In 1881 the Armstrong brothers – William, Thomas, Robert, and John – purchased the leasehold of "Gunbar" for £300,000, and John Armstrong continued as the managing partner. Stock returns for 1888 record the area of "Gunbar" station as 280,000 acres (1,100 km^{2}), reflecting the inroads made by selectors since the mid-1870s as the district became more closely settled and the village of Gunbar was established. After John Armstrong's death in 1899 his eldest son, William, managed the station until it was sold in June 1918 to T. A. Creswick.

=== Gunbar village ===
William Spry and his brother George were successful carriers based in the Hay district in the 1860s. William Spry married Florence Donnelly in 1870 at Bendigo; at about that time Spry built a slab hotel at the future site of Gunbar village, a locality south of "Gunbar" station where carriers often camped. By September 1871 Spry had applied for a licence for his public-house, the Gunbar Hotel. Florence Spry ran the hotel while her husband continued to work his bullock-teams in the district. The original structure was burnt down but William Spry replaced it with a weatherboard-clad structure. By November 1873 the licence of the Gunbar Hotel was held by John Donohue. In the first half of the following year the licence was transferred from Donohue to Charles Simpson, and soon afterwards to Ebenezer Wood. By October 1875 the publican was Henry Major. William Spry had selected land east of Gunbar which he called "Paradise Farm" and continued to work as a carrier in the district. In 1879 the Gunbar Hotel licence was transferred from Henry Major to James McPherson.

A Post Office opened at Gunbar on 1 July 1879 (it closed in 1979), with James McPherson as postmaster. By the early 1880s Gunbar village consisted of the Gunbar Hotel run by Archibald McPherson, a blacksmith's shop, a wheelwright's shop, a Chinese market garden and a mail change (a dwelling and stables where the coach horses were changed). Robertson and Wagner (part of the Cobb & Co. network) ran mail and passenger services to Hillston from both Hay and Carrathool with the routes converging at Gunbar. Protestant religious services began to be held from January 1881 in the dining-room of the Gunbar Hotel, conducted by the Presbyterian minister from Hay, Rev. Samuel A. Hamilton.

In July 1883 the Department of Lands set aside land for a "future village at Gunbar". In early 1884 the township of Gunbar was surveyed by the Government Surveyor. However, the proposed township was located just over a mile NNE of the original village that had developed around Spry's hotel. A church was the first building erected at the surveyed township (opened in July 1884), with money raised locally by subscription. Though nominally Presbyterian, services by Anglican and Methodist ministers were occasionally also held at the church (which was removed in 1914 to a location near the original village). Some town lots at the surveyed site were purchased and a few buildings erected there, but there was little enthusiasm for the location. Often referred to as North Gunbar, the location lacked shade and fresh well-water. John G. Bunn, appointed postmaster after James McPherson resigned in 1885, built a Post Office and store near the church. (The Post Office remained at North Gunbar until Bunn's death in 1899, when it reverted to the original village.) William Gannon erected a hotel at North Gunbar in about 1886, but failed to obtain a publican's licence. Undeterred, Gannon and his large family operated the establishment, known as "Gannon's Hotel", as a sly-grog shop and boarding-house.

A public school was established at Gunbar in 1883 with 19 pupils enrolled in the first year. In February 1884 Edward Mensforth took over as publican of the Gunbar Hotel. In 1884 the firm of Meakes & Fay, merchants at Hay, established a large store at Gunbar (South), dealing in general goods and produce. The store was managed by William J. Simpson and Harrison S. Pollard. In 1889 William Simpson and Harrison Pollard purchased the business of the store and continued to trade as Simpson and Pollard. Their "commodious" produce store became a regular venue for local dances and other social functions. In 1888 William Simpson married Catherine Robertson, the daughter of a local selector. Harrison Pollard married Laura Hillman in 1892 (the daughter of another local selector) and the couple settled on a selection called "Honuna". Simpson bought out his partner and became sole owner of the store. Catherine Simpson died in 1888, after the birth of her first child. In 1893 William Simpson married Catherine's sister Rachel. William and Rachel Simpson continued to run the store at Gunbar. The Post Office was located there from 1899 after John Bunn's death. In early May 1903 W. J. Simpson's store (including the local post office) was destroyed by fire and soon afterwards William Simpson and his family relocated to Hay.

=== A slow decline ===
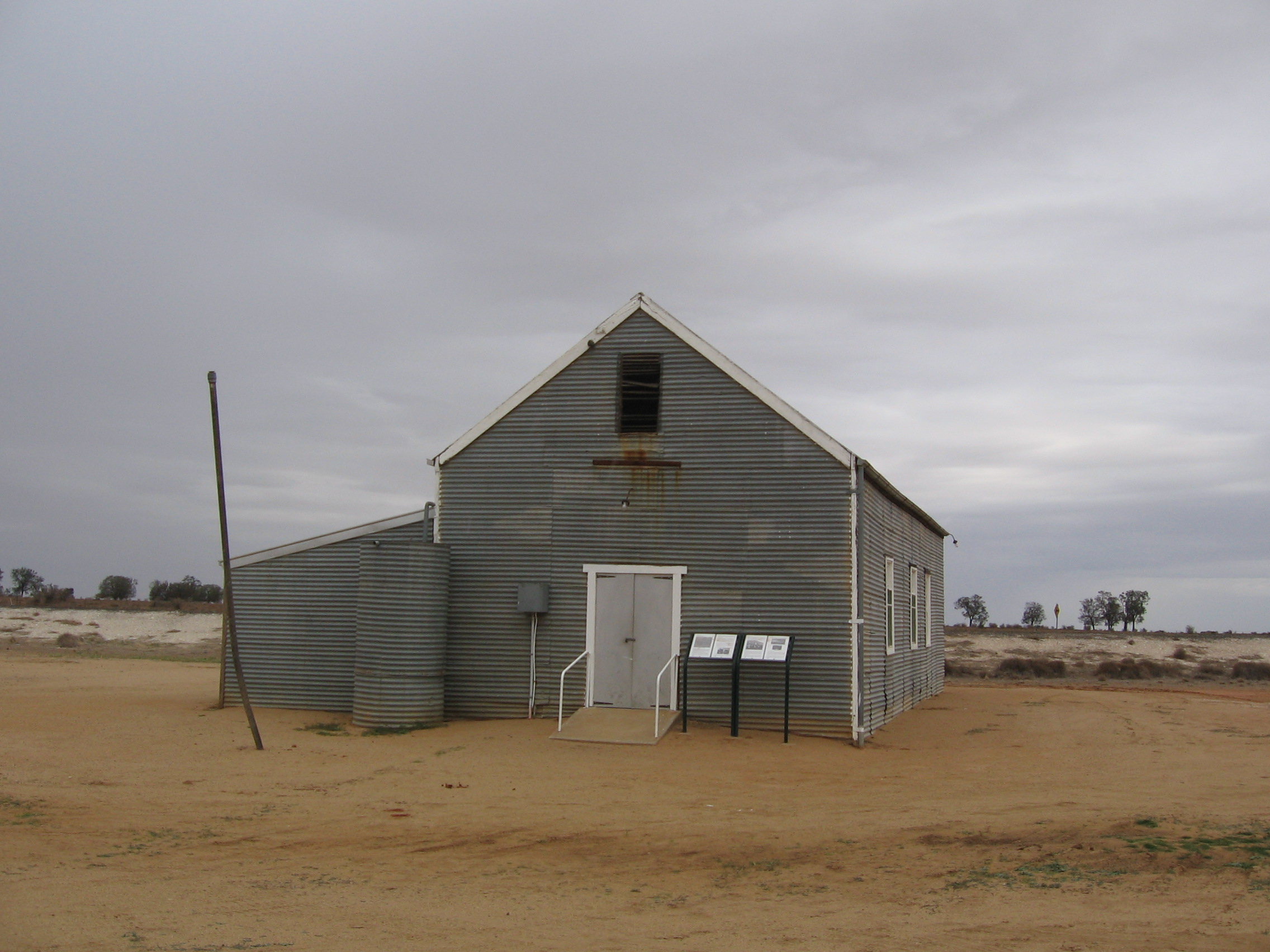
Community Hall

The devastation wrought by the Federation Drought, which began in the late 1890s and ended in 1903, began a period of decline and de-population of Gunbar village and farmers in the surrounding district.

In the great drought of 1902 this part of the State was the scene of great suffering... It is sufficient to say that the country was an absolute, windswept desert; that women and children lived on the verge of starvation, while the menfolk deserted their homesteads and went elsewhere to try to earn sustenance.

Many of the residents of Gunbar and district re-located to the nearby towns of Hillston, Hay and Griffith in the early decades of the twentieth century.

In January 1922 a wind-storm "which assumed cyclonic strength" passed through Gunbar township causing "considerable damage". The "principal damage" was to the Public Hall, a weatherboard structure (of about 15 × 9 metres), "which was blown over and considerably broken". The roof of the hotel "was blown off", trees were "blown down and uprooted" and outhouses and sheds "suffered greatly". A replacement hall had been constructed at Gunbar by October 1922.

The Gunbar Hotel ("a link between the past and the present") was destroyed by fire in December 1926.

The site of the original village continued as a focus for activities and social events for residents of the surrounding district.

=== The Pioneer Memorial Church ===
During the period January 1881 to June 1884 Protestant services were conducted in the Gunbar Hotel by the Presbyterian minister, Samuel A. Hamilton (based at Hay), for which service the congregation subscribed £50 per annum. A church was constructed and opened in July 1884 at the site of the surveyed village (north of the original settlement) where it stood until 1914, when it was taken down in sections by a contractor from Hay and re-located to an elevated location near Gunbar village. The Presbyterian church was re-opened at its new location in June 1914.

In 1922 the "severe gale" that destroyed the village hall, also caused damaged to the local church. The church "was found to have suffered severely from the storm" and despite temporary repairs during the following decade it was realised "that the task of reconditioning the building would be a heavy one". In 1933 the local congregation determined to mark the 50th anniversary of the opening of the church by erecting a replacement building as "a fitting memorial to the pioneers, who, though previously members of diverse denominations, made common cause to erect a church where all might join in the worship of God". In December 1933 the tender of Messrs. Shannon Bros. was accepted for erection of the new church.

The Pioneer Memorial Church was opened in July 1934. The building, in the Gothic-style, is constructed of "cement bricks" and includes four memorial windows "dedicated to the memory of Gunbar pioneers". All buildings at the site, as well as fence posts, were constructed of cement to deter white ants. The cost of the structure and fittings was about £1,120 and "the Church was opened free of debt".

== "Black Stump" ==
Gunbar cemetery is the burial-place of Mrs. Barbara Blain, the woman whose accidental death in March 1886 possibly gave rise to the Australian expression "Black Stump", the name for a sort of nebulous location beyond which the country is considered remote (as in "beyond the black stump" or "this side of the black stump"). Mrs. Blain's husband was a carrier or teamster, based at Hay. Carriers were an integral part of the Riverina economy during the 19th century; they transported wool and supplies by drays drawn by horse- or bullock-teams, travelling across the landscape servicing stations and settlements distant from the main transport hubs of the region.

James Blain and Barbara Maude had married in 1876 in New Zealand. The couple had no children; Mrs. Blain (at least occasionally) accompanied and assisted her husband in his work. On 10 March 1886 James and Barbara Blain were camped at a pine ridge on "Gunbar" station, in company with other carriers. James and the other men left the camp-site to load posts onto their drays, while Barbara began preparations for the evening meal. On their return the men found that Mrs. Blain had been fatally burnt, probably after her dress had caught alight from the flames of the camp-fire. She was buried at nearby Gunbar cemetery on 13 March. An inquest into Mrs. Blain's death was held at Hay on 20 March 1886. The expression "black stump" is said to have arisen from part of James Blain's description of what had happened (possibly as part of his evidence at the inquest); Blain apparently stated that when he found his wife she "looked like a black stump". A watering place near to where the tragedy occurred – roughly halfway between Gunbar and the village of Merriwagga – became known as Black Stump Tank.

== William Jackson, VC ==
William Jackson, VC

William Jackson was an Australian recipient of the Victoria Cross (VC). He is the youngest Australian to have been awarded a Victoria Cross.

William Jackson was born and raised in the Gunbar district. William's father, John Jackson, had been born in Paddington, Sydney, and was working as a farm labourer at Gunbar when he met Adelaide McFarlane, the daughter of John and Elizabeth McFarlane. They married in 1890 at "Seaton Farm", the home of Adelaide's parents. On 15 November 1905, William's mother Adelaide Jackson died, leaving the surviving children – Elizabeth, Catherine, May, William, Albert and Leslie – in the care of their grandparents. William's father at this time worked on "Gunbar" station. William and his siblings attended the Gunbar School and William later found employment on district properties.

On 15 February 1915 William Jackson enlisted in the Australian Imperial Forces in the first group of volunteers from Gunbar. In order to do so, with his father's approval, Jackson had raised his age by one year. William Jackson was awarded the Victoria Cross in 1916 for selfless courage under heavy fire while rescuing his comrades near Armentières in France during World War I.
