= Franklin County, New South Wales =

Franklin
- Cadastral division
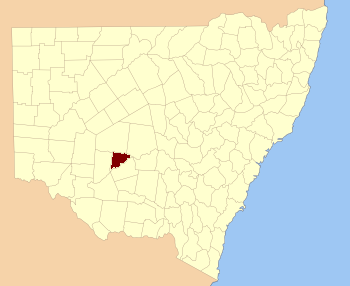
- Location in New South Wales
- Country: Australia
- State: New South Wales
Lands administrative divisions around Franklin
Mossgiel	Mossgiel	Blaxland
Waljeers	Franklin	Dowling
Waljeers	Nicholson	Nicholson

Franklin County is one of the 141 cadastral divisions of New South Wales. It lies between Waverley Creek and the Lachlan River, in the area to the north-west of Hillston.

Franklin County was named in honour of the Arctic explorer, Rear Admiral, and Lieutenant-Governor Sir John Franklin (1786–1847).

== Parishes within this county ==
A full list of parishes found within this county; their current LGA and mapping coordinates to the approximate centre of each location is as follows:

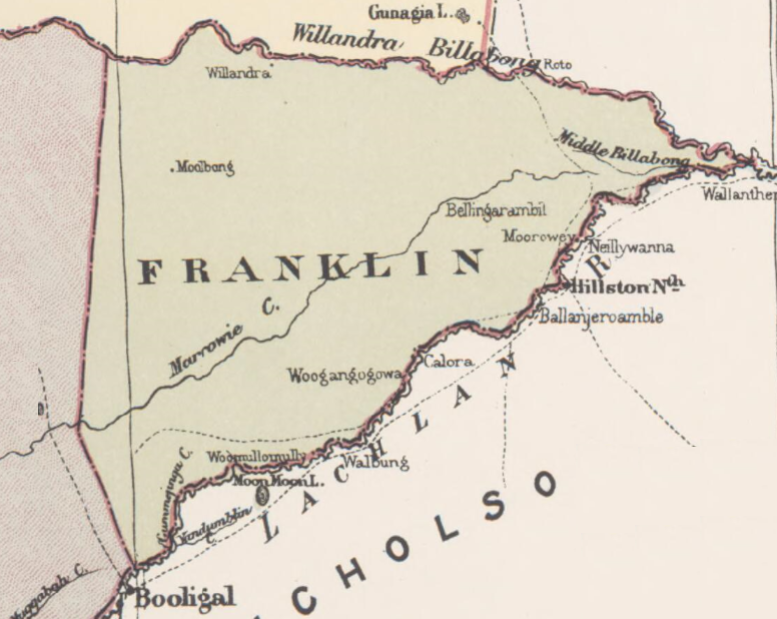
Map of Franklin County from John Sands 1886 map.

Parish	LGA	Coordinates
Audrey	Carrathool Shire Council	33°31′11″S 144°56′52″E
Baeda	Carrathool Shire Council	33°26′45″S 145°12′39″E
Bellatherie	Carrathool Shire Council	33°19′35″S 145°22′44″E
Beremagaa	Carrathool Shire Council	33°14′05″S 145°24′48″E
Bundunglong	Carrathool Shire Council	33°12′44″S 145°06′36″E
Caaba	Carrathool Shire Council	33°39′40″S 145°08′06″E
Clutha	Carrathool Shire Council	33°38′10″S 145°00′02″E
Embagga	Carrathool Shire Council	33°25′04″S 145°28′19″E
Florabel	Carrathool Shire Council	33°28′12″S 145°16′28″E
Golgothrie	Carrathool Shire Council	33°33′09″S 145°01′40″E
Gonowlia	Carrathool Shire Council	33°21′05″S 145°36′11″E
Goolagunni	Carrathool Shire Council	33°14′52″S 145°34′17″E
Hadyn	Carrathool Shire Council	33°25′21″S 145°22′27″E
Ideraway	Carrathool Shire Council	33°41′13″S 144°56′40″E
Ini	Carrathool Shire Council	33°36′52″S 145°15′57″E
Kendal	Carrathool Shire Council	33°25′26″S 145°07′54″E
kirindi	Carrathool Shire Council	33°33′40″S 144°52′05″E
Kongong	Carrathool Shire Council	33°19′10″S 145°29′02″E
Lalla	Carrathool Shire Council	33°21′51″S 144°52′46″E
Marowie	Carrathool Shire Council	33°27′20″S 145°29′04″E
Merungle	Carrathool Shire Council	33°36′09″S 144°55′36″E
Merv	Carrathool Shire Council	33°21′41″S 145°18′39″E
Molesworth	Carrathool Shire Council	unknown
Moolborg	Carrathool Shire Council	33°20′58″S 144°58′13″E
Myamyn	Carrathool Shire Council	33°22′57″S 145°03′38″E
Narralin	Carrathool Shire Council	33°18′59″S 145°38′49″E
Nellywanna	Carrathool Shire Council	33°25′27″S 145°31′48″E
Papekura	Carrathool Shire Council	33°12′28″S 145°00′27″E
Poli	Carrathool Shire Council	33°28′57″S 145°01′24″E
Roeta	Carrathool Shire Council	33°17′27″S 144°57′59″E
Saburra	Carrathool Shire Council	33°35′32″S 145°06′43″E
Terry	Carrathool Shire Council	33°14′43″S 145°29′47″E
Thononga	Hay Shire Council	33°46′21″S 144°54′03″E
Tooloor	Carrathool Shire Council	33°15′19″S 145°18′52″E
Urugalah	Carrathool Shire Council	33°17′26″S 145°14′47″E
Vieta parish	Carrathool Shire Council	33°27′34″S 145°05′58″E
Warragoodinia	Carrathool Shire Council	33°22′17″S 145°22′53″E
Wheelbah	Carrathool Shire Council	33°39′32″S 145°13′12″E
Wirringa	Carrathool Shire Council	33°12′58″S 144°54′57″E
Wogonga	Carrathool Shire Council	33°30′45″S 145°18′57″E
Wyadra	Carrathool Shire Council	33°30′06″S 145°24′36″E
Wyuna	Carrathool Shire Council	33°16′15″S 145°06′49″E
Yandembah	Carrathool Shire Council	33°29′56″S 144°52′43″E
Yaree	Carrathool Shire Council	33°13′36″S 145°12′40″E
