= Mulla Mulla, New South Wales =

Mulla Mulla
- Coordinates: 33°48′54″S 145°05′04″E
- Country: Australia
- State: New South Wales
- Region: Riverina
- LGA: Hay Shire
- Location: 750 km (470 mi) W of Sydney
- County: Nicholson
- Parish: Mulla Mulla
Localities around Mulla Mulla
	Mulla Mulla
Booligal	Booligal	Booligal

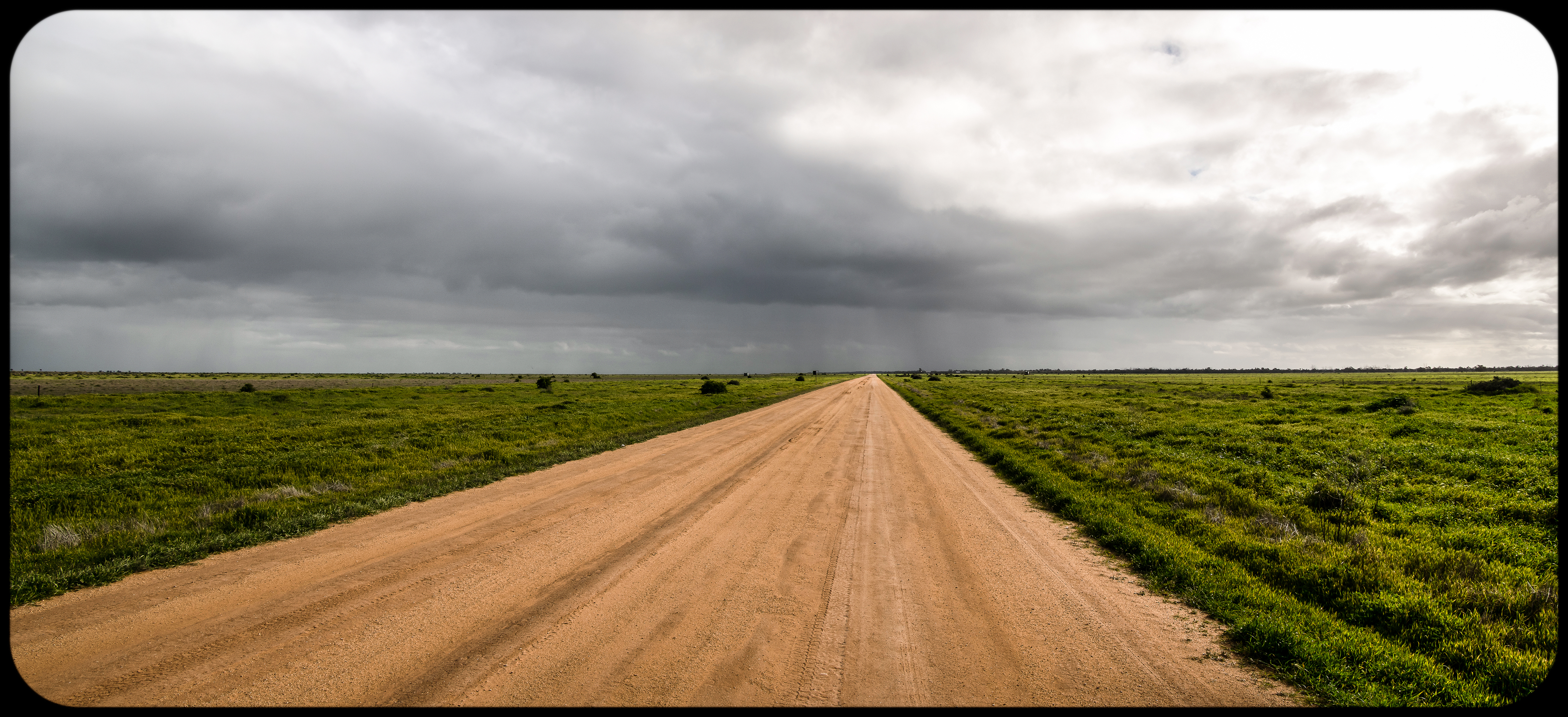
Landscape around Mulla Mulla

Mulla Mulla is a rural locality in Hay Shire Council and a civil parish of Nicholson County in New South Wales.

== Geography ==
The parish, located 750 km (460 mi) from Sydney on the Lachlan River, is flat, semi-arid and the main economic activity is agriculture. There are no towns in the parish though the town and river crossing of Booligal, New South Wales is nearby to the south west.
