= Langtree, New South Wales =

Langtree
- Town
- Coordinates: 33°39′40″S 145°33′56″E
- Country: Australia
- State: New South Wales
- LGA: Carrathool Shire Council
- Location: 8 km (5.0 mi) from Goorawin; 22 km (14 mi) from Hillston

Government
  - State electorate: Murray
  - Federal division: Farrer
- Postcode: 2652
- County: Nicholson

Langtree is a rural locality and the site of a discontinued railway station in the central northern part of the Riverina. The railway station was about 8 kilometres north of Goorawin and 22 kilometres south of Hillston.
