= Merriwagga =

Merriwagga New South Wales
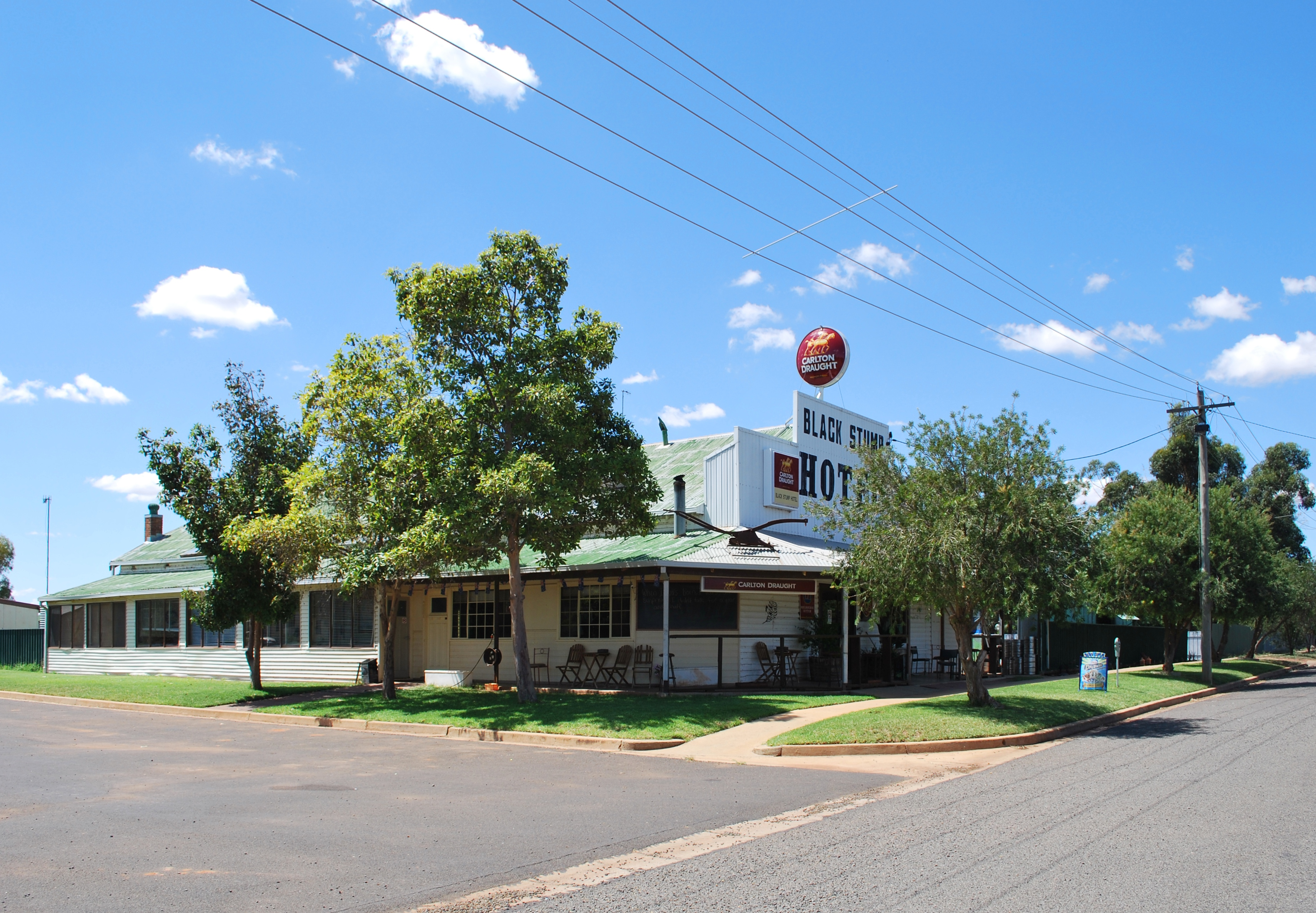
- Black Stump Hotel

- Coordinates: 33°49′12″S 145°37′20″E
- Population: 124 (SAL 2021)
- Postcode(s): 2652
- Elevation: 98 m (322 ft)
- Location: 643 km (400 mi) W of Sydney; 70 km (43 mi) NW of Griffith; 40 km (25 mi) S of Hillston
- LGA(s): Carrathool Shire
- County: Nicholson
- State electorate(s): Murray
- Federal division(s): Farrer

Merriwagga is a town in the northern part of the Riverina region of the Australian state of New South Wales. It is situated by road, about 20 kilometres (12 mi) north west of Goolgowi and 42 kilometres (26 mi) south of Hillston on the Kidman Way in NSW. At the 2011 census, it has a population of 169. The main industry is agriculture.

The village was surveyed and gazetted on 4 April 1924 and is laid out in an irregular rectangular pattern. It is surrounded by the Merriwagga State Forest, a loosely mallee-forested area of approximately 15 square kilometres (5.8 sq mi). Merriwagga Post Office opened on 26 May 1924.

Merriwagga railway station lies between Goolgowi station and Goorawin station. It is dominated by three massive grain silos and two grain receival depots. The Black Stump Hotel across the road boasts the tallest bar in Australia, it was established in 1926. The name relates to the Black Stump Story telling of the death of Mrs. Barbara Blain. She burnt to death in March 1886 at Black Stump Tank, approximately halfway between Merriwagga and Gunbar. Her story and the life of the early pioneer women is commemorated in the Memorial to Pioneer Woman of the Merriwagga District, situated next to the picnic area between Black Stump Hotel and the grain receival depots.

== Gallery ==
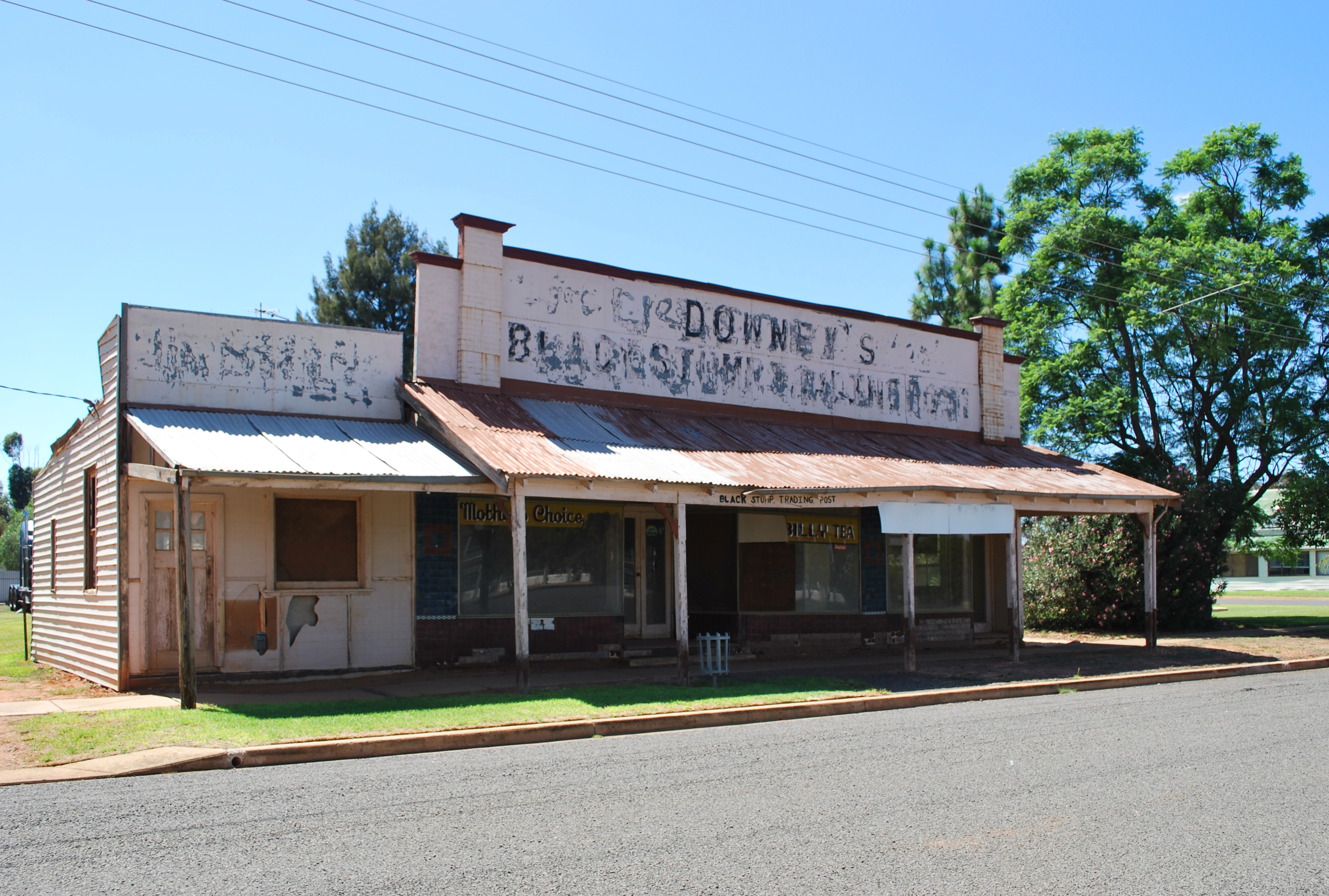
Black Stump Trading Post

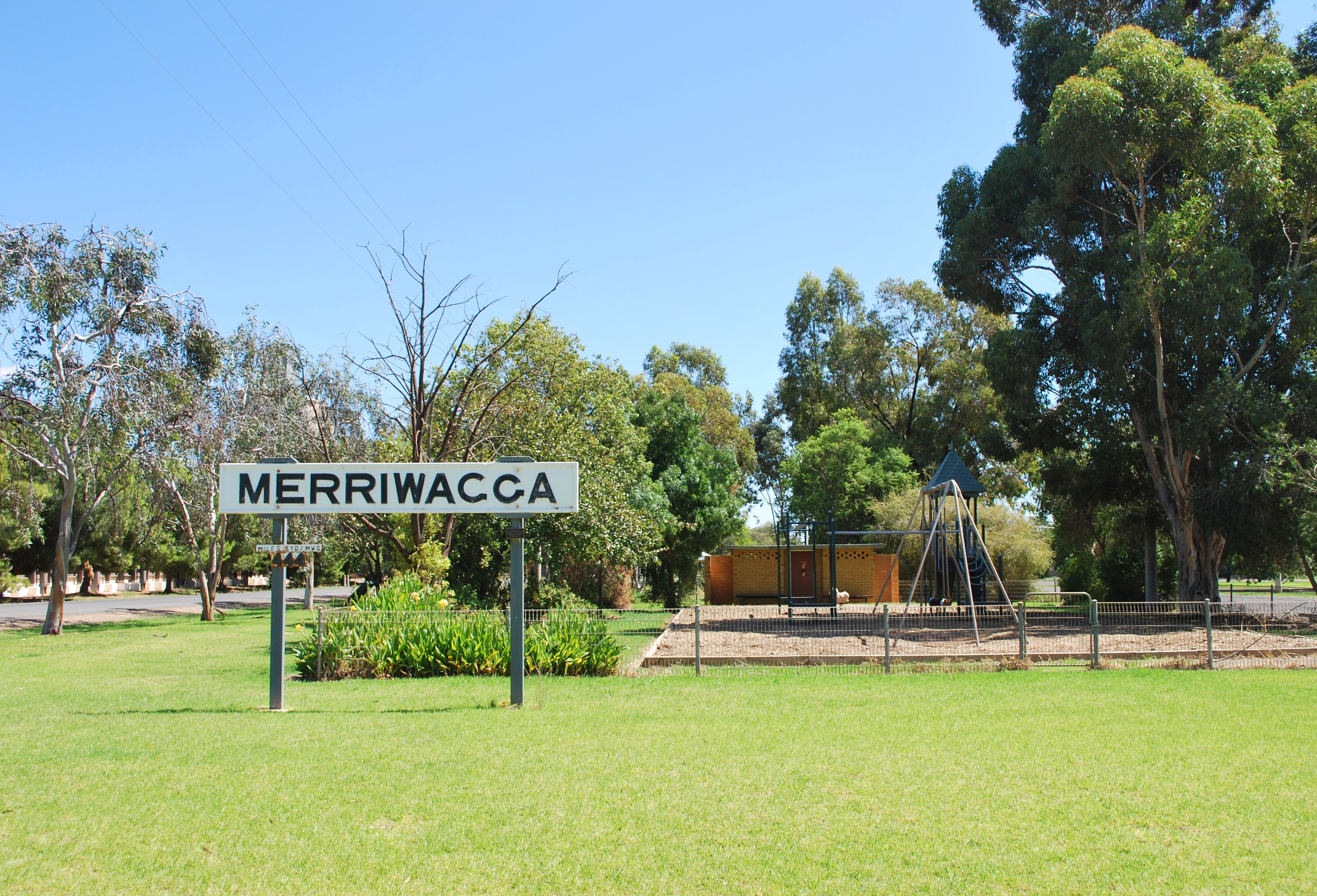
Merriwagga Railway Station sign (relocated)

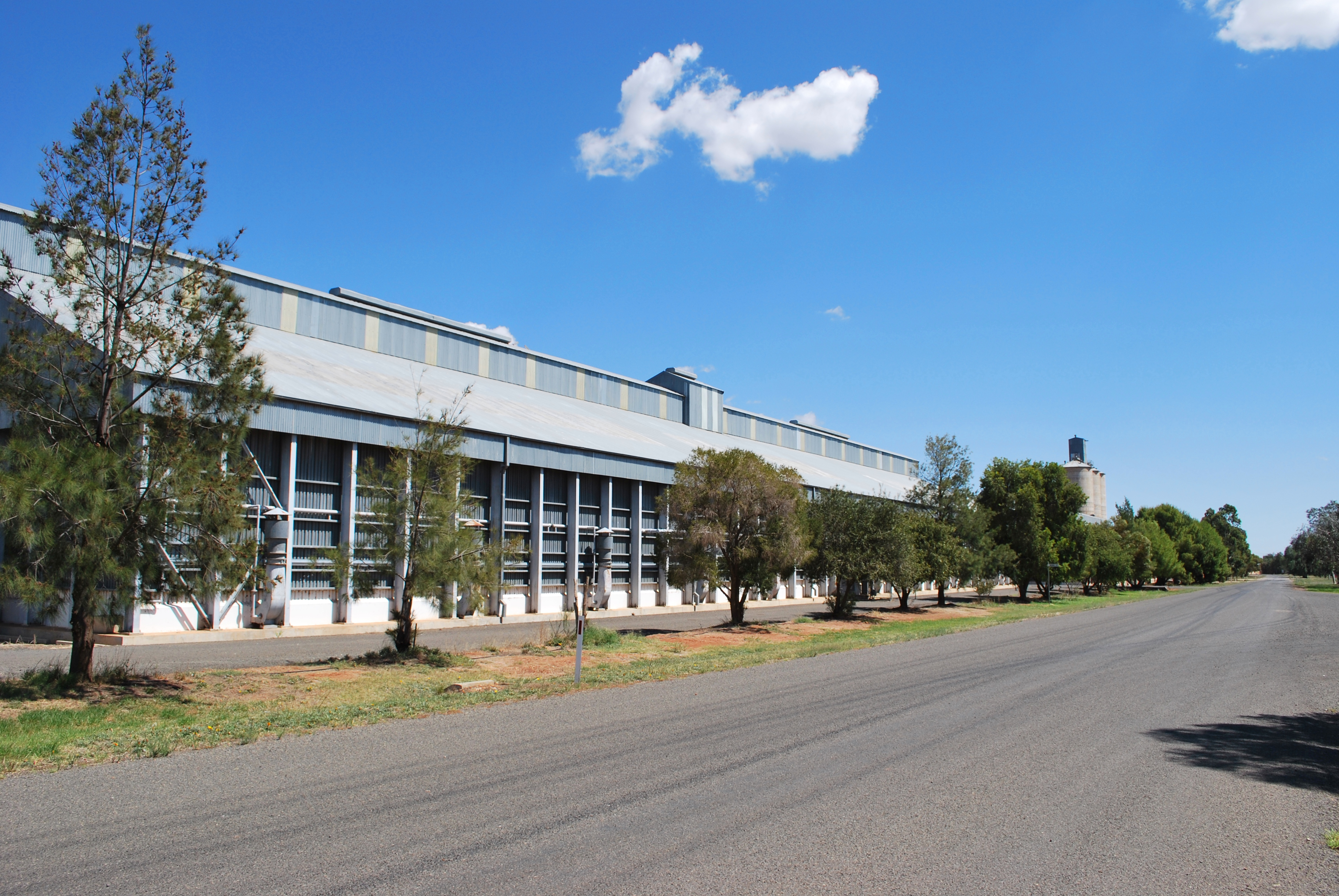
Silos and grain elevators

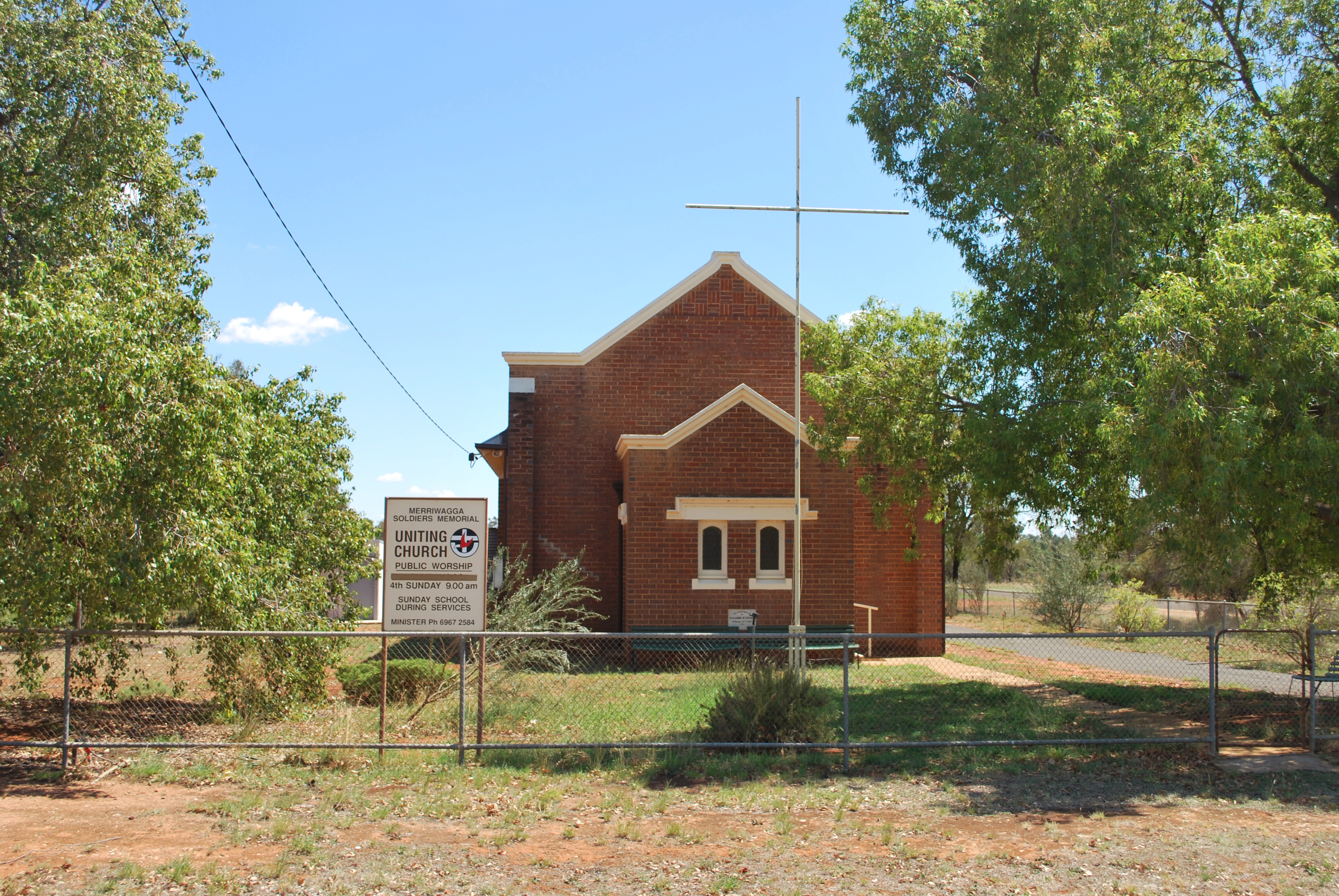
Soldiers' Memorial Uniting Church
