= Yandumblin, New South Wales =

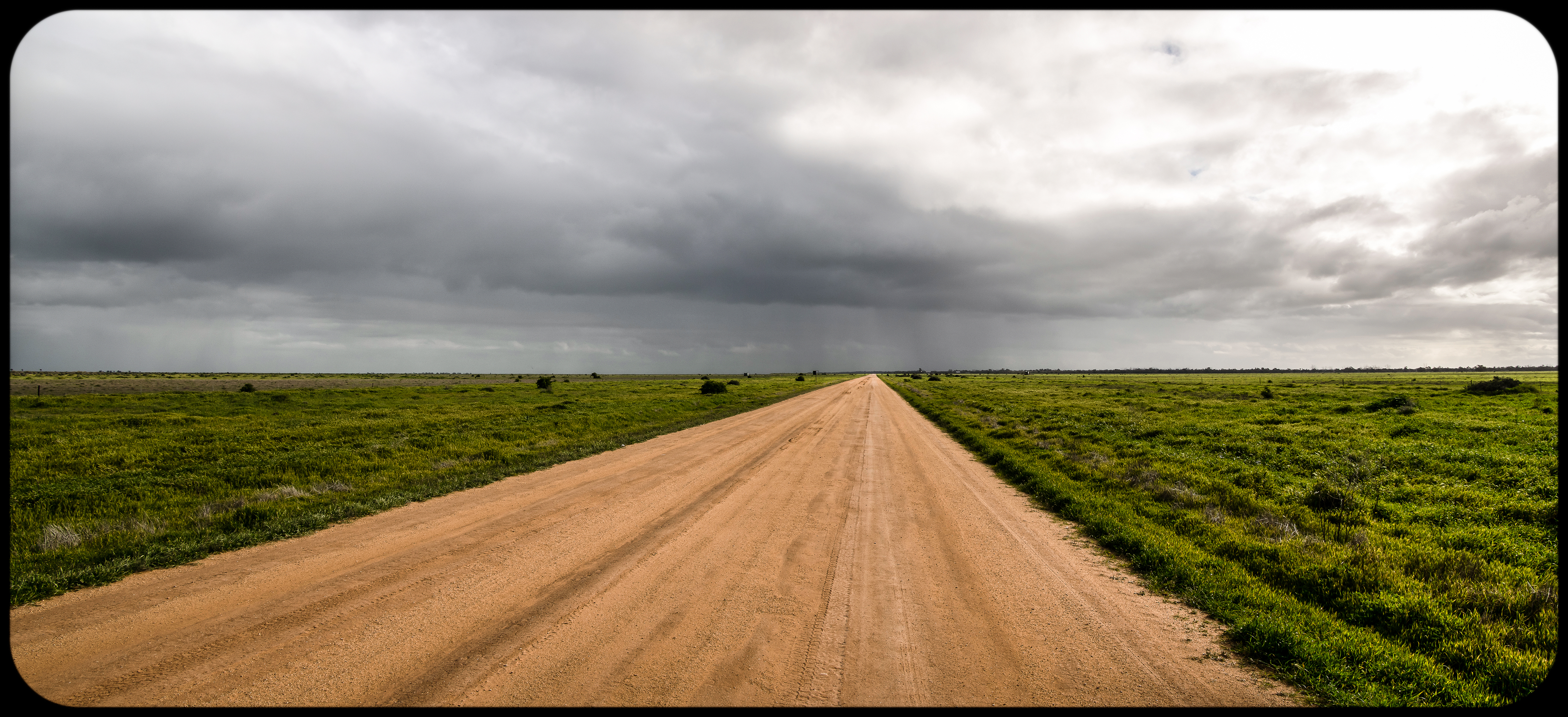
Yandumblin, New South Wales

Yandumblin is a rural locality of Hay Shire Council and a civil parish of Nicholson County, in the Riverina region of Australia.

== Geography ==
The parish located at 33°47′54″S 144°59′04″E is flat, semi-arid and the main economic activity is agriculture. The Parish 750 km (460 mi) from Sydney is on the Lachlan River and Yandumblin Creek. There are no towns in the parish though the town and river crossing of Booligal, New South Wales is just outside the parish.

== History ==
Yandumblin is situated on the traditional boundary of the Muthi Muthi and Nari Nari Aboriginal tribes.

Pastoralists arrived in the area in the 1850s. and the nearby town of Boooligal was established in July 1860.
