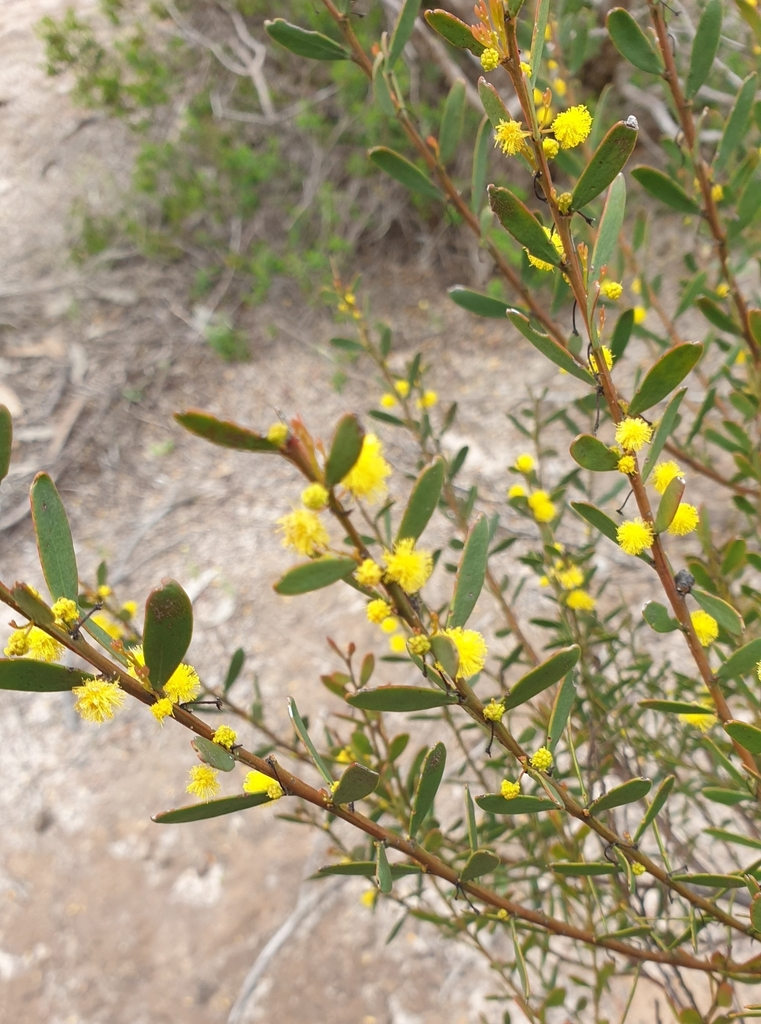
- Near Stansbury on the Yorke Peninsula

Scientific classification
- Kingdom: Plantae
- Clade: Tracheophytes
- Clade: Angiosperms
- Clade: Eudicots
- Clade: Rosids
- Order: Fabales
- Family: Fabaceae
- Subfamily: Caesalpinioideae
- Clade: Mimosoid clade
- Genus: Acacia
- Species: A. microcarpa

Binomial name
- Acacia microcarpa F.Muell.
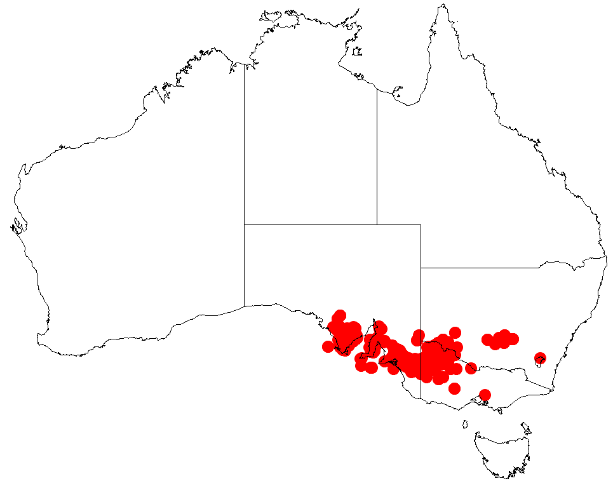
- Occurrence data from AVH

Synonyms
- Acacia microcarpa F.Muell. nom. inval., nom. nud.; Acacia microcarpa F.Muell. isonym; Acacia microcarpa F.Muell. var. microcarpa; Acacia subretusa Maiden & Blakely; Racosperma microcarpum (F.Muell.) Pedley

= Acacia microcarpa =

Manna wattle

Species of plant

Acacia microcarpa, commonly known as manna wattle, is a species of flowering plant in the family Fabaceae, and is endemic to the south-east of mainland Australia. It is a glabrous, erect to spreading shrub with usually lance-shaped phyllodes with the narrower end towards the base, spherical heads of bright, mid golden yellow flowers, and firmly papery, linear pods prominently raised over the seeds.

== Description ==
Acacia microcarpa is a glabrous, erect to spreading shrub that typically grows to a height of up to 3 m (9.8 ft) and has branchlets that are somewhat angled near the outer ends. The bark is grey and finely fissured. Its phyllodes are normally lance-shaped, with the narrower end towards the base, sometimes oblong or elliptic, straight to slightly curved, mostly 20–55 mm (0.79–2.17 in) long, 4–10 mm (0.16–0.39 in) wide, the midrib not prominent with two glands, one near the tip of the phyllode and the other 3–20 mm (0.12–0.79 in) above the pulvinus. The flowers are borne in spherical heads in axils on a peduncle 4–10 mm (0.16–0.39 in) long, each head with 14 to 25 bright, mid-golden yellow flowers. Flowering occurs from August to November, and the pods are linear, slightly to prominently curved, up to 80 mm (3.1 in) long, 2–5 mm (0.079–0.197 in) wide, firmly papery and prominently raised over the seeds. The seeds are elliptic to widely elliptic and dark brown with a more or less club-shaped aril that is up to one-third the length of the seed.

== Taxonomy ==
Acacia microcarpa was first formally described in 1858 by Ferdinand von Mueller in hisFragmenta Phytographiae Australiae . The specific epithet (microcarpa) means 'small-fruited'.

== Distribution and habitat ==
Manna wattle grows in a range of vegetation associations and soil type, including in mallee in red sand and sandy loam from Wudinna on the Eyre Peninsula in South Australia to the Mallee Cliffs National Park in New South Wales and to Gunbower in northern Victoria with an isolated occurrence in the Goolgowi–West Wyalong area.

== See also ==
- List of Acacia species
