= Goorawin, New South Wales =

Goorawin
- Town
- Coordinates: 33°43′38″S 145°35′21″E
- Country: Australia
- State: New South Wales
- LGA: Carrathool Shire Council
- Location: 8 km (5.0 mi) from Langtree; 11 km (6.8 mi) from Merriwagga

Government
  - State electorate: Murray
  - Federal division: Farrer
- Postcode: 2652
- County: Nicholson

Goorawin is a rural locality and the site of a discontinued railway station and siding in the central northern part of the Riverina. It is situated by rail, about 7 kilometres south of Langtree and 12 kilometres north of Merriwagga.
