= Dowling County =

Dowling
- Cadastral division
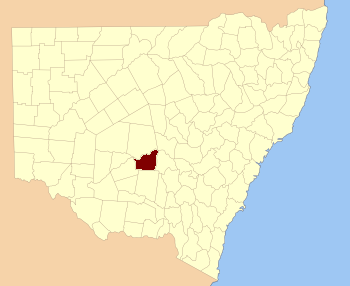
- Location in New South Wales
- Country: Australia
- State: New South Wales
Lands administrative divisions around Dowling
Blaxland	Blaxland	Cunningham
Franklin	Dowling	Gipps
Nicholson	Cooper	Cooper

Dowling County is one of the 141 cadastral divisions of New South Wales.

Dowling County was named in honour of Judge Sir James Dowling (1787–1844).

== Parishes within this county ==
A full list of parishes found within this county; their current LGA and mapping coordinates to the approximate centre of each location is as follows:

Parish	LGA	Coordinates
Bimbalingel	Lachlan Shire Council	33°18′54″S 146°12′04″E
Bimbil	Bland Shire Council	33°37′54″S 146°08′04″E
Blairgowrie	Bland Shire Council	33°37′54″S 146°35′04″E
Bootoowa	Lachlan Shire Council	33°24′54″S 146°11′04″E
Borapine	Lachlan Shire Council	33°18′54″S 146°43′04″E
Brewer	Lachlan Shire Council	33°25′54″S 146°05′04″E
Brotheroney	Lachlan Shire Council	33°10′54″S 146°44′04″E
Cargelligo	Lachlan Shire Council	33°22′54″S 146°23′04″E
Carilla	Carrathool Shire Council	33°24′54″S 145°55′04″E
Carisbrook	Lachlan Shire Council	33°28′54″S 146°05′04″E
Clowery	Bland Shire Council	33°42′54″S 146°40′04″E
Contarlo	Lachlan Shire Council	33°28′54″S 146°10′04″E
Currawong	Bland Shire Council	33°34′54″S 146°22′04″E
Curriba	Lachlan Shire Council	33°27′54″S 146°41′04″E
Currikabakh	Bland Shire Council	33°43′54″S 146°30′04″E
Davis	Bland Shire Council	33°43′54″S 146°07′04″E
Dowling	Carrathool Shire Council	33°32′54″S 146°03′04″E
Gainbill	Lachlan Shire Council	33°23′54″S 146°31′04″E
Garryowen	Lachlan Shire Council	33°28′54″S 146°19′04″E
Geelooma	Bland Shire Council	33°36′54″S 146°40′04″E
Guagong	Lachlan Shire Council	33°09′54″S 146°37′04″E
Gumbagunda	Lachlan Shire Council	33°08′54″S 146°29′04″E
Gurangully	Lachlan Shire Council	33°13′54″S 146°24′04″E
Jimberoo	Bland Shire Council	33°43′54″S 146°13′04″E
Kikoira	Bland Shire Council	33°39′54″S 146°40′04″E
Killawarra	Lachlan Shire Council	33°26′54″S 146°30′04″E
Lachlan	Lachlan Shire Council	33°11′54″S 146°20′04″E
Merri Merrigal	Carrathool Shire Council	33°25′54″S 146°00′04″E
Mologone	Bland Shire Council	33°37′54″S 146°15′04″E
Moneybung	Carrathool Shire Council	33°29′54″S 146°00′04″E
Murrabung	Bland Shire Council	33°44′54″S 146°24′04″E
Naradhan	Bland Shire Council	33°43′54″S 146°18′04″E
Narden	Lachlan Shire Council	33°22′54″S 146°42′04″E
Narriah	Bland Shire Council	33°43′54″S 146°34′04″E
Regent	Lachlan Shire Council	33°26′54″S 146°17′04″E
Rutland	Bland Shire Council	33°37′54″S 146°31′04″E
Tibeaudo	Lachlan Shire Council	33°24′54″S 146°33′04″E
Tooronga	Lachlan Shire Council	33°22′54″S 146°17′04″E
Townsend	Carrathool Shire Council	33°33′54″S 145°59′04″E
Trigalong	Lachlan Shire Council	33°11′54″S 146°28′04″E
Tuggerabach	Lachlan Shire Council	33°28′54″S 146°33′04″E
Uabba	Lachlan Shire Council	33°19′54″S 146°07′04″E
Ulambong	Lachlan Shire Council	33°13′54″S 146°11′04″E
Valencia	Carrathool Shire Council	33°39′54″S 145°58′04″E
Wardry	Lachlan Shire Council	33°04′54″S 146°45′04″E
Whoyeo	Lachlan Shire Council	33°18′54″S 146°18′04″E
Whyaddra	Lachlan Shire Council	33°03′54″S 146°38′04″E
Womboyn	Bland Shire Council	33°40′54″S 146°20′04″E
Yarrabundry	Lachlan Shire Council	33°17′54″S 146°36′04″E
Yarran	Lachlan Shire Council	33°18′54″S 146°31′04″E
Yelkin	Lachlan Shire Council	33°27′54″S 146°22′04″E
