= Moon Moon, New South Wales =

Moon Moon, New South Wales is a rural locality of Hay Shire Council and a civil parish of Nicholson County. in the Riverina region of Australia.

Moon Moon is located at 33°44′54″S 145°06′04″E, 750 km (460 mi) from Sydney and is on the Lachlan River. The area is dominated by broad acre agriculture, with no towns in the parish boundary.
