= Black Stump =

Australian expression

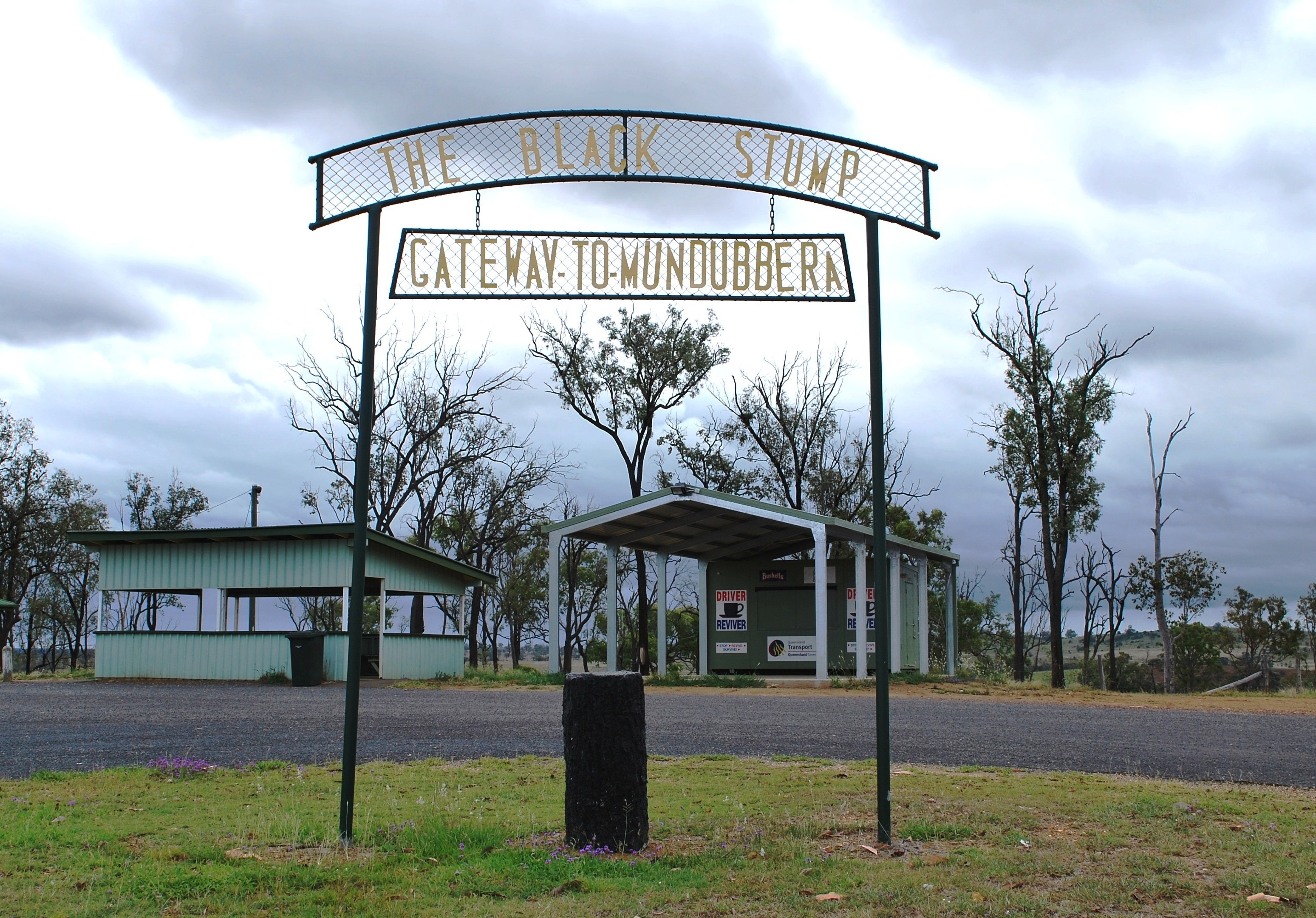
The "Black Stump" at Mundubbera, Queensland, a concrete structure

Black stump is an Australian expression for an imaginary point beyond which the country is considered remote or uncivilised, an abstract marker of the limits of established settlement. The origin of the expression, especially in its evolved use as an imaginary marker in the landscape, is contested.

The term "Black stump" was used as land markers on a surveyors plan and was first referred to as a boundary marker in a New South Wales court case involving a land law dispute. The case refers to vacant land at Woolloomooloo where a surveyor had difficulty in ascertaining the boundaries as he could not find a plan from the days of Governor Lachlan Macquarie. In the case it stated, "...and he pointed to some old stumps, which he said had been marked...defendant would not admit that the cross line marked by me on the plan was not part of his boundary...he said it ran to a black stump beyond the line, which he said had been marked...; he said the line was to run somewhere thereabouts; utmost extent claimed by defendant was the black stump of which I have spoken...made no claims beyond South Head road..."

One theory states that the expression derives from the use of black stumps in the landscape as markers when directing travellers. Other explanations relate to historical events associated with places or geographical features with names incorporating the phrase "black stump". At least three regional Australian towns claim the expression originated in their general vicinity.

== Vernacular formulations ==
The term 'black stump' is used in various formulations. The most common are:

- 'beyond the black stump' or 'back of the black stump'

in the outback; remote from civilisation.

The following quote from John Wynnum's I'm a Jack, all Right (1967; p. 18) conveys this meaning: "It's way back o' Bourke. Beyond the Black Stump. Not shown on the petrol station maps, even." In 1956, British novelist Nevil Shute published Beyond the Black Stump, a novel set in the 1940/50s, contrasting the social mores of a still remote Western Australian sheep station and a small town in Oregon, USA, which still thought of itself as a frontier town despite the Cadillac dealership and the fast food joint

- 'this side of the black stump'

in the world known to the speaker; anywhere in the general community.

The following is from Vision Splendid by Tom Ronan (1954; p. 264): "You're looking... at the best bloody station bookkeeper this side of the black stump."

Another use of the phrase 'black stump' in the Australian vernacular, which relates more to the real object than an abstract concept of landscape, is the local term for the old State Office Block in Sydney (now demolished). The high-rise building was dark-grey in colour and Sydney residents – “with the local talent for belittling anything that embarrassed them with its pretensions" – dubbed it 'the Black Stump'. The same name has been applied to the Grenfell Centre, briefly the highest building in Adelaide.

== Etymology ==
The most prosaic explanation for the origin of 'black stump' derives from the general use of fire-blackened tree-stumps as markers when giving directions to travellers unfamiliar with the terrain. An early use of the phrase from the Sydney journal Bulletin (31 March 1900, p. 31) seems to lend support to this explanation: "A rigmarole of details concerning the turns and hollows, the big tree, the dog-leg fence, and the black stump".

Robbery Under Arms, a fictionalised work by Rolf Boldrewood first published in 1888, refers to the Black Stump as an actual place "within a reasonable distance of Bathurst" and known to everybody for miles around. Boldrewood says it "had been a tremendous old Ironbark tree- nobody knew how old, but it had had its top blown off in a thunderstorm, and the carriers had lighted so many fires against the roots of it that it had been killed at last, and the sides were as black as a steamer's funnel."

Raffaello Carboni used the phrase 'black-stump' in his account of the Eureka Stockade uprising which he wrote in 1855, probably referring to a well-worn pipe: "Please, give me a dozen puffs at my black-stump, and then I will proceed to the next chapter". There appears to be no obvious link between the use of the phrase by Carboni and the expression being used as an imaginary marker in the landscape.

The evolution of meaning of the phrase 'black stump', from the real to an imaginary marker of landscape, probably occurred during the nineteenth century. There is a widespread belief that the expression took root amongst carriers or teamsters that operated in the regional districts of Australia. Carriers were an integral part of the rural economy during the nineteenth century; they transported wool and supplies by drays drawn by horse- or bullock-teams, travelling constantly across the landscape servicing stations and settlements distant from regional transport hubs and urban centres.

If the use of the expression 'black stump' entered the Australian vernacular in the nineteenth century, it rarely appeared in Australian literature or newspaper reports until the twentieth century.

At least three towns in regional Australia claim to be home to the 'black stump': Coolah, NSW; Merriwagga and Gunbar in NSW; and Blackall in Queensland.

== Coolah, New South Wales ==
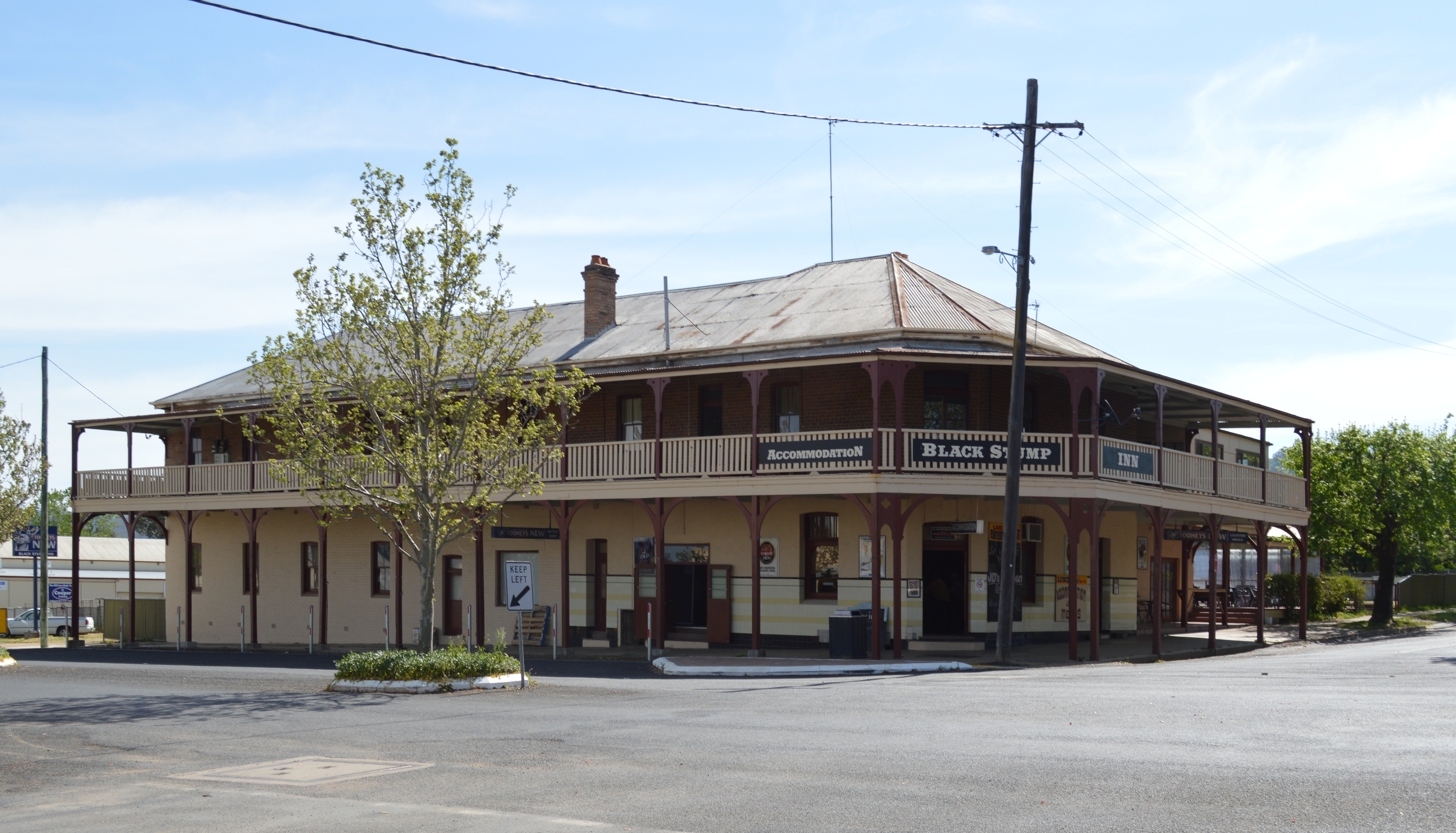
The Black Stump Inn in Coolah (31.8241°S 149.7199°E)

The area just north of present-day Coolah was known by local Aboriginal peoples as 'Weetalibah-Wallangan', apparently meaning "place where the fire went out and left a burnt stump". In an attempt to control the settlement patterns of the colony of New South Wales Governor Darling issued regulations in 1829 limiting settlement in the colony to land within the Nineteen Counties surrounding Sydney. The regulations defined the "limits of location", and it is claimed this boundary passed "along the approximate location of the Black Stump Run" (located just north-west of present-day Coolah). Land to the north of this part of Governor Darling's boundary (it is asserted) began to be described as "beyond the Black Stump".

This raises the question: had the Black Stump Run been taken up by 1829 (or at least by the mid-1830s)? Darling's "limits of location" was a short-lived concept; in 1836 Governor Bourke allowed individuals occupying lands beyond the Nineteen Counties to obtain annual licenses to legitimise their activities and the "limits of location" became officially irrelevant.

In a list of persons who obtained licences to depasture stock beyond the limits of location in the district of Bligh for the year ending 30 June 1847 appears the entry "Launt Joseph ... The Black Stump". Archival research may produce earlier references.

In May 1851, a notice was published by James M'Cubbin of Coolah, warning against trespassing by cattle or persons on his run "The Black Stump" in the district of Bligh.

By 1885, the Black Stump run had been consolidated with the Queensborough run into the Queensborough Pastoral Holding of some 46,000 acres. The name lived on in local usage, and there are currently three place names in the vicinity of the original run approved by the Geographical Names Board of New South Wales, i.e. Black Stump Graveyard/Cemetery, Black Stump Creek and Black Stump Resting Place.

Apparently a teamster named John Higgins took up land in the vicinity of the Black Stump Run (possibly in the early 1860s when Robertson's Land Bills allowed land selection to occur). Higgins built an inn in the 1860s which he called The Black Stump Inn, located at the junction of roads leading to Gunnedah and Coonabarabran. The inn later became the Black Stump Wine Saloon and was destroyed by fire in 1908. It has been suggested that the saloon was an important staging post for traffic to north-west New South Wales and it became a marker by which people gauged their journeys.

== Merriwagga / Gunbar, New South Wales ==
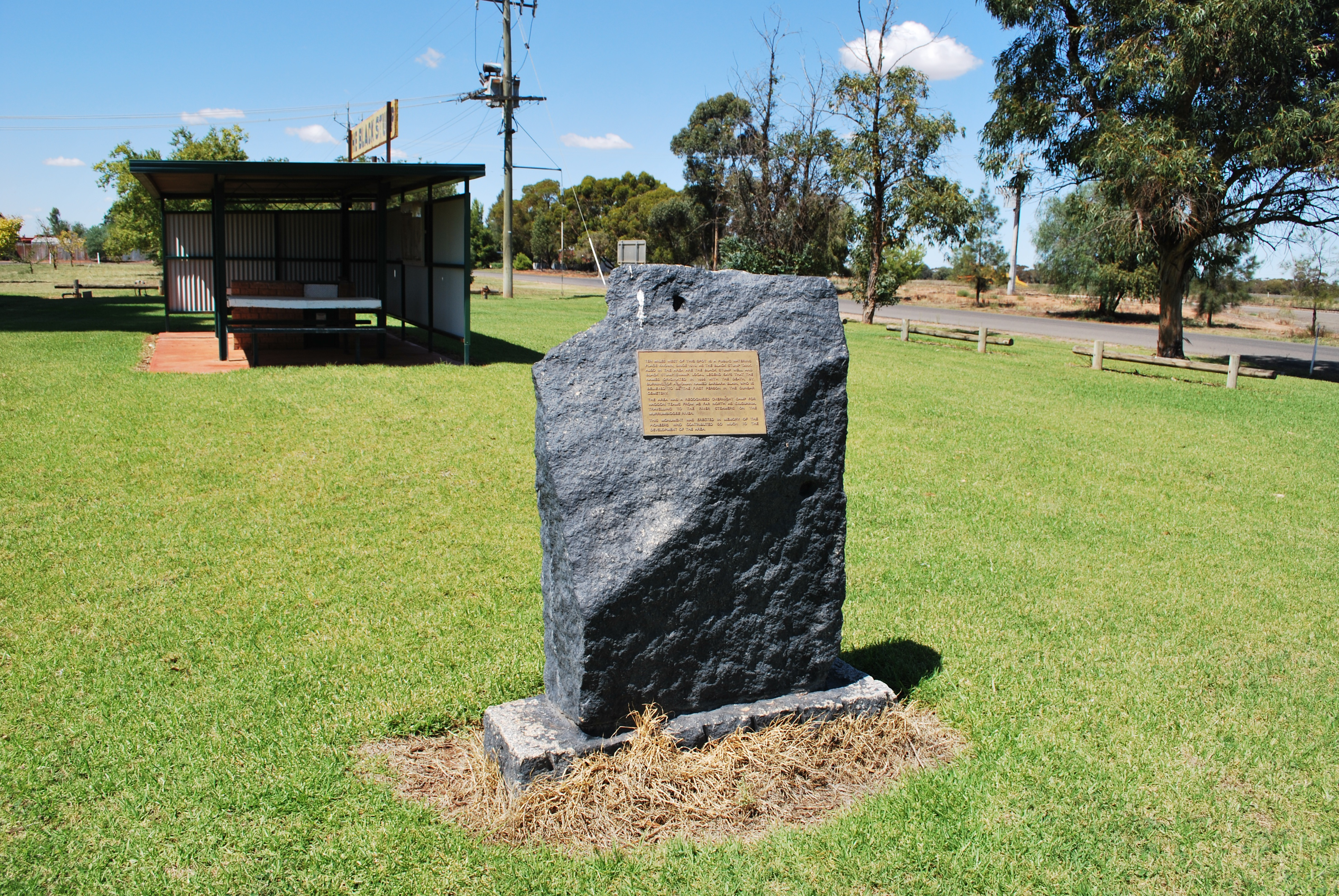
Black stump monument at Merriwagga

The village of Merriwagga and nearby community of Gunbar, in the Riverina district of New South Wales, have strong claims to the origin of the expression 'black stump'. Gunbar cemetery is the burial-place of Mrs. Barbara Blain, the woman whose accidental death in March 1886 possibly gave rise to the term.

Barbara Blain's husband, James, was a carrier or teamster, based at Hay. In March 1886 James and Barbara Blain, in company with other carriers, stopped to camp at a pine ridge on "Gunbar" station. James and the other men left to load posts onto their drays and Barbara began preparations for the evening meal. When they returned, the men found Mrs. Blain had been fatally burnt, probably after her dress had caught alight from the flames of the camp-fire. Barbara Blain was buried at nearby Gunbar cemetery and an inquest into her death was subsequently held. James Blain apparently stated that when he found his wife she "looked like a black stump" (possibly as part of his evidence at the inquest). A watering place near where the tragedy occurred – roughly halfway between Gunbar and the village of Merriwagga – became known as Black Stump Tank.

The Black Stump Picnic area at Merriwagga has a waggon and memorial stone (33.8170°S 145.6227°E), with an inscription which explains the details of these events.

== Blackall, Queensland ==
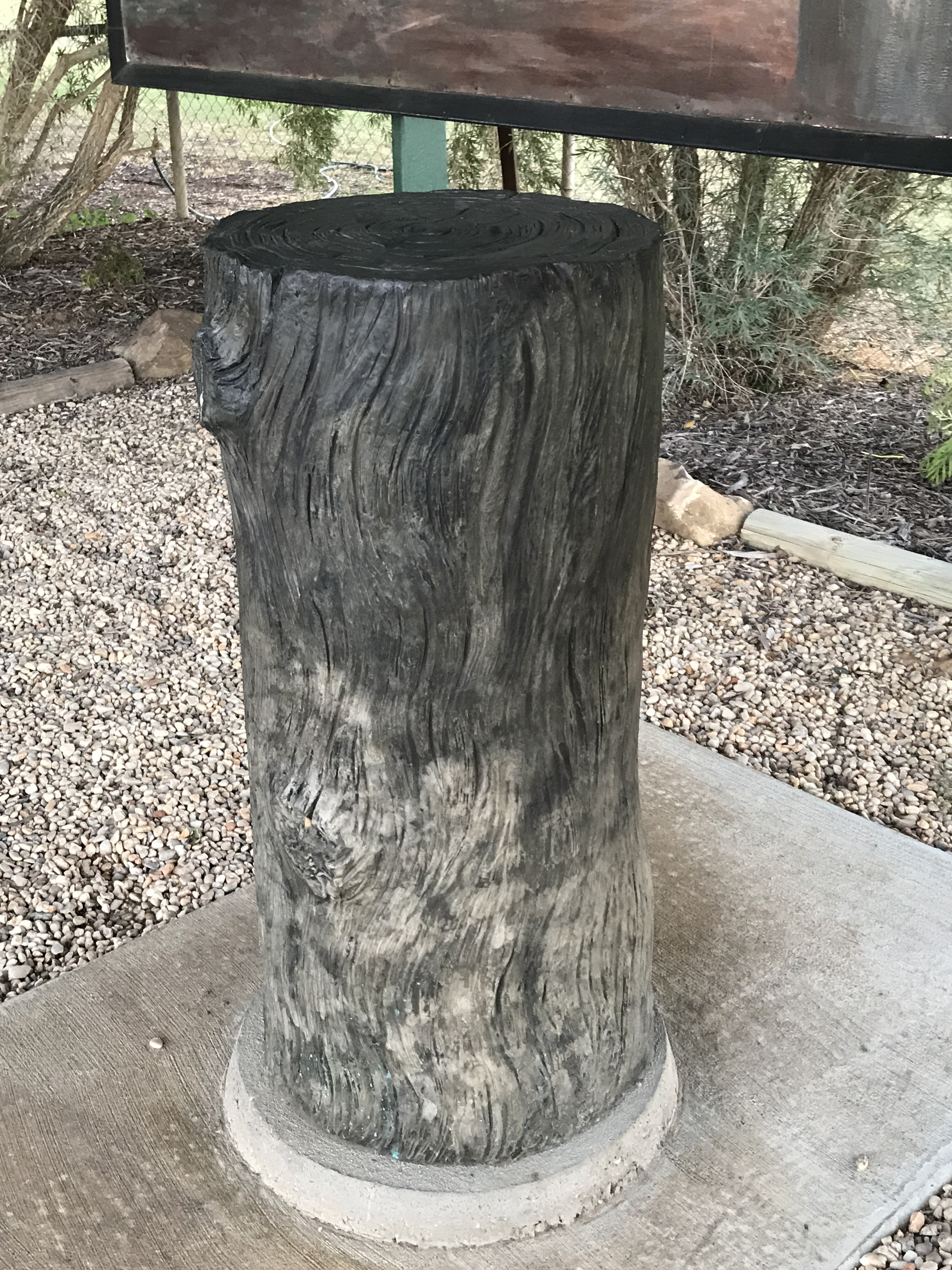
Reconstruction of the Black Stump (the original was burned down), Blackall, 2019

The town of Blackall, Queensland makes the following claim to the origin of the expression. In 1887 a group of surveyors arrived in Blackall (near the centre of Queensland, over 1,000 kilometres west of Brisbane) and established an Astro Station on this site to conduct survey readings to establish a principal meridional circuit traverse around the town. Stumps and other suitable stable platforms were often used rather than a set of legs because they gave more stability to the heavy theodolites then used to take longitudinal and latitudinal observations.

This Astro station was used as part of the survey to fix the position of principal towns extending from Brisbane to Boulia via Roma, Charleville and Blackall and enabled the mapping of Queensland on a more accurate basis.

It was considered at the time that country to the west of Blackall was beyond the 'black stump'.

A stump of petrified wood which marks the location of the original Astro Station is found at the monument in Thistle Street (24.4238°S 145.4697°E) near Blackall State School. This petrified stump replaces the original blackened timber stump destroyed by fire.

== Modern culture ==
Beyond the Black Stump is a syndicated cartoon strip, featuring Australian native animals as characters. It is published in papers across Australia including The Courier-Mail in Brisbane, Queensland.

The Black Stump Music and Arts Festival was a four-day Christian festival that is held in the Greater Sydney Metropolitan region over the Labour Day long weekend, often the first weekend in October, from 1985 to 2014.

In Adelaide, the Grenfell Centre, the city's tallest building during the 1970s, is nicknamed "the black stump".

A restaurant chain also operated under the same name, serving popular Australian food, with branches forming as far away as Hong Kong.

In the United Kingdom Laithwaite Wines market a durif/shiraz blend from Casella Wines called "Black Stump".

== See also ==
- The bush
- Beyond the pale
