= Naradhan =

- Town
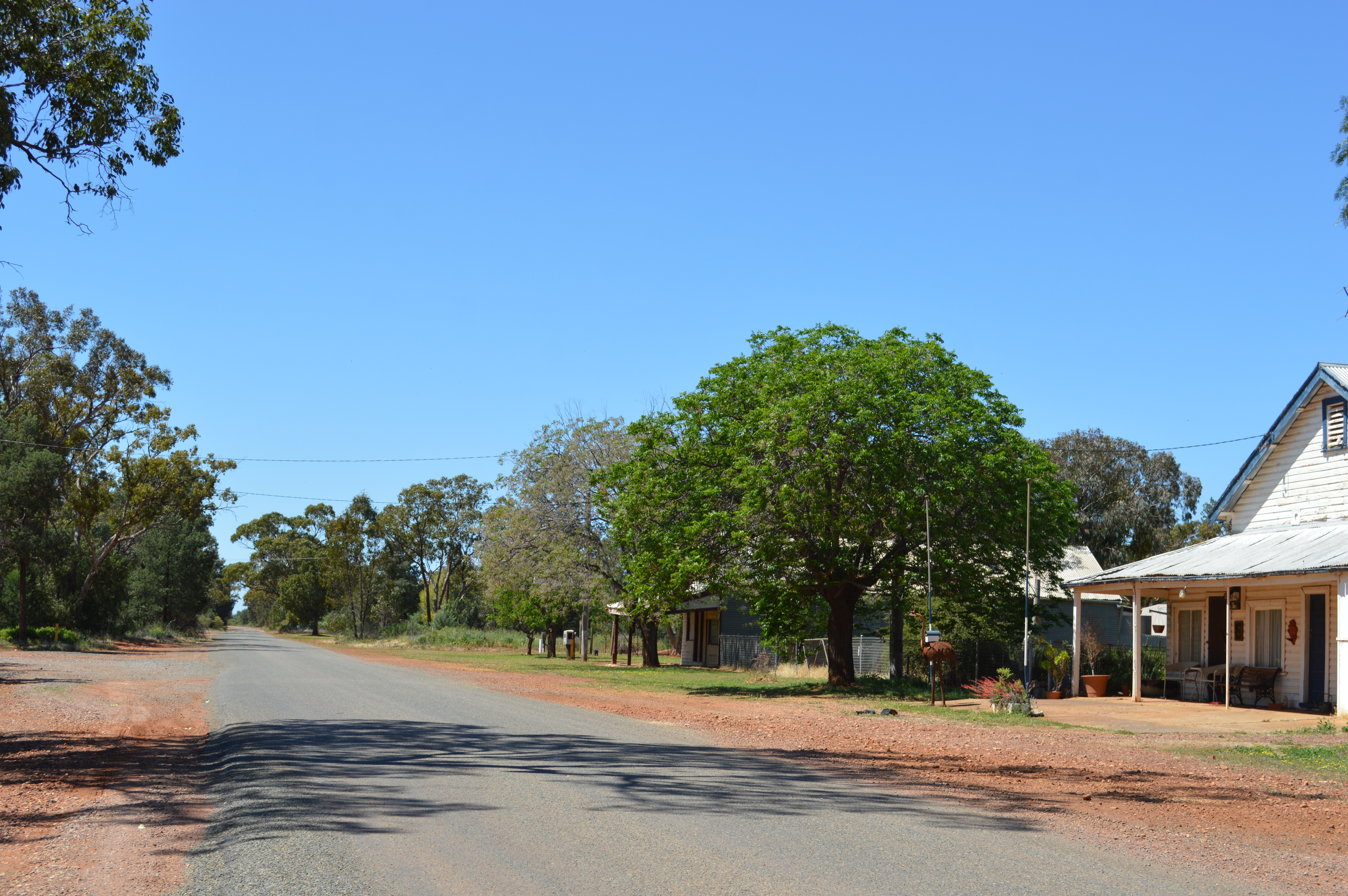
- Kikoira Road, the main street of Naradhan

- Coordinates: 33°37′0″S 146°19′0″E
- Country: Australia
- State: New South Wales
- LGA: Bland Shire
- Location: 452 km (281 mi) W of Sydney; 96 km (60 mi) N of Griffith; 32 km (20 mi) N of Rankins Springs

Government
  - State electorate: Cootamundra
  - Federal divisions: Parkes; Farrer

Population
  - Total: 63 (SAL 2021)
- Postcode: 2669

Naradhan is a village and locality in the Central West region of New South Wales Australia. The locality is 452 kilometres (281 mi) from Sydney, the state capital. Naradhan is within the Bland Shire local government area. The village was proclaimed in 1930, and features a shop, primary school, public hall, and the now disused railway station. The town was named after Naradhan a grazing run that was in turn probably named for the Wiradjuri term "ngarradan" meaning "bat".

At the 2011 census, Naradhan had a population of 166 (51.2% males and 48.8% females) with an average age of 39 years. 95.2% of the population is Australian-born and 100% speak English as a first language. The main religions are Anglican (34.5%) and Catholic (22.6%) and the median household income is $1097.00 per week. The village is located on Naradhan Creek. Naradhan Creek starts below Mount Mologone at an elevation of 204m and drops around 57.6m over its 9.51 km length.

The locality is roughly equivalent to the cadastral parishes of Womboyne, Jimberoo, and Currawong in the county of Dowling. The area is bordered by the towns of Lake Cargelligo to the north and Rankins Springs to the south. Although predominantly flat and cleared for agriculture, significant geographic features include a number of mesa in the southern portion as well as the Jimberoo and Conapaira State forests. There are also significant mineral deposits in the north of Naradhan, including gold, lead, and tin.

The Naradhan railway line was opened in 1929.
