= Carrathool =

- Town
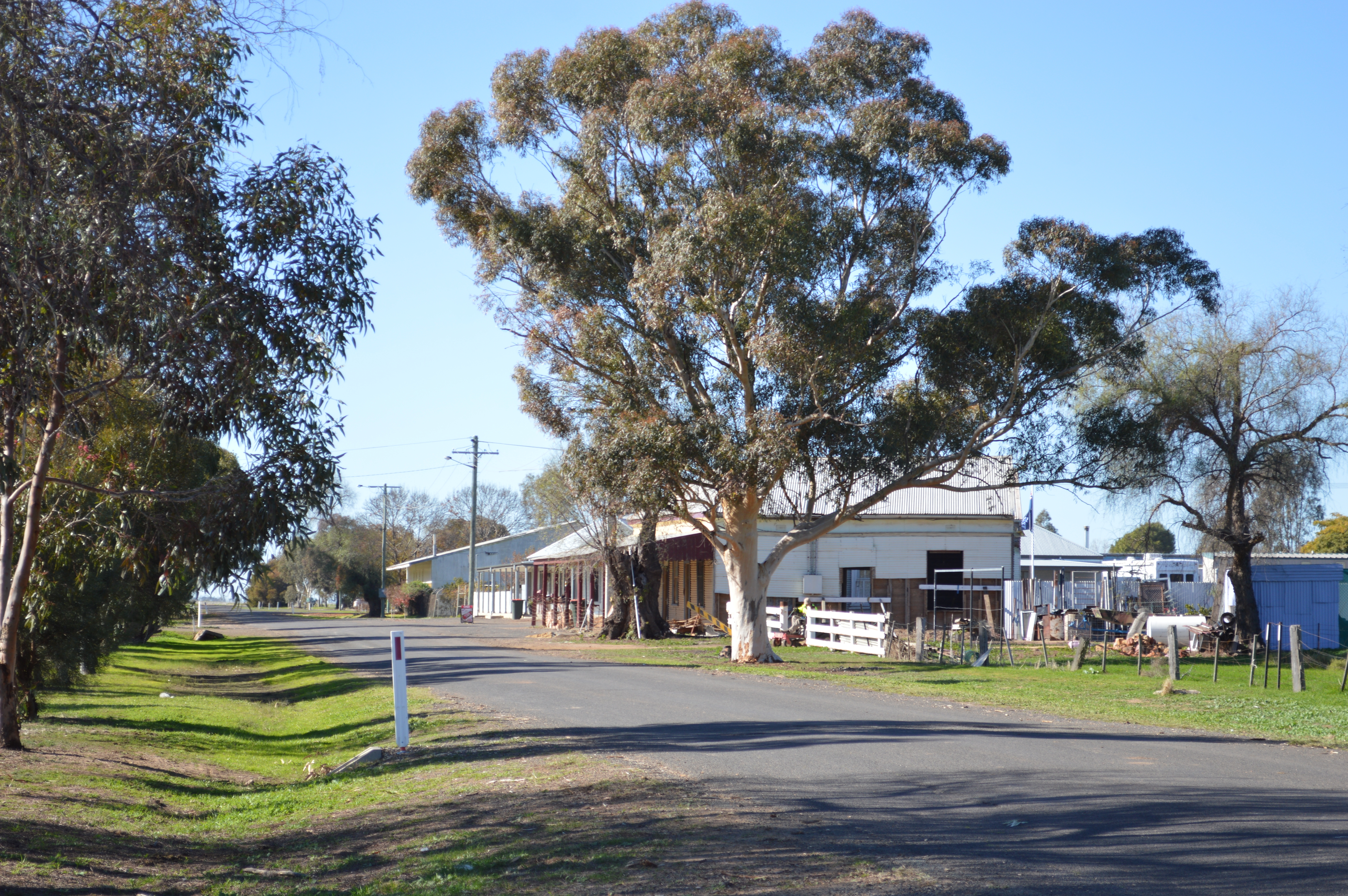
- Wade St, the main street of Carrathool

- Coordinates: 34°25′0″S 145°26′0″E
- Country: Australia
- State: New South Wales
- LGA: Carrathool Shire
- Location: 674 km (419 mi) from Sydney; 102 km (63 mi) from Griffith; 68 km (42 mi) from Goolgowi; 64 km (40 mi) from Hay

Government
  - State electorate: Murray
  - Federal division: Farrer
- Elevation: 104 m (341 ft)

Population
  - Total: 238 (2016 census)
- Postcode: 2711
- County: Sturt

Carrathool /ˈkærəθuːl/ is a village in the western Riverina region of New South Wales, Australia, in Carrathool Shire. In 2011 census, Carrathool had a population of 296 people. It is about 5 kilometres (3 mi) north of the Sturt Highway between Darlington Point and Hay (on the opposite side of the Murrumbidgee River to the highway). The village is situated on the plain a few kilometres north of the river, clustered around the now-disused railway station on a non-operational section of the Hay line.

The place name Carrathool is derived from the local Aboriginal word meaning "Native Companion".

== History ==
=== Carrathool Reserve ===
In October 1852 a reserve of 4 1/2 square miles (12 km^{2}) was proclaimed (No. 13 in the Lachlan Pastoral District); it was situated at the location known as Currathool on the north bank of the Murrumbidgee River "on a cattle run occupied by Mr. Rudd".

The location of the original village of Carrathool – or 'Currathool' as it was often written – was at a river-crossing on the Murrumbidgee River at a place called Boree Point.

Carrathool Post Office opened on 20 June 1882. Carrathool notably is sign posted on its outskirts "population 99" and for many years hoped to reach 100, however with droughts and children often moving to larger centres this figure may never have been reached. The above census figures for 2006 would not relate to the township of Carrathool and would not have a higher population than its neighbouring township of Goolgowi.

== Heritage listings ==
Carrathool has a number of heritage-listed sites, including:

- 244 Main Road: Carrathool Bridge over Murrumbidgee River
