= Goolgowi =

- Town
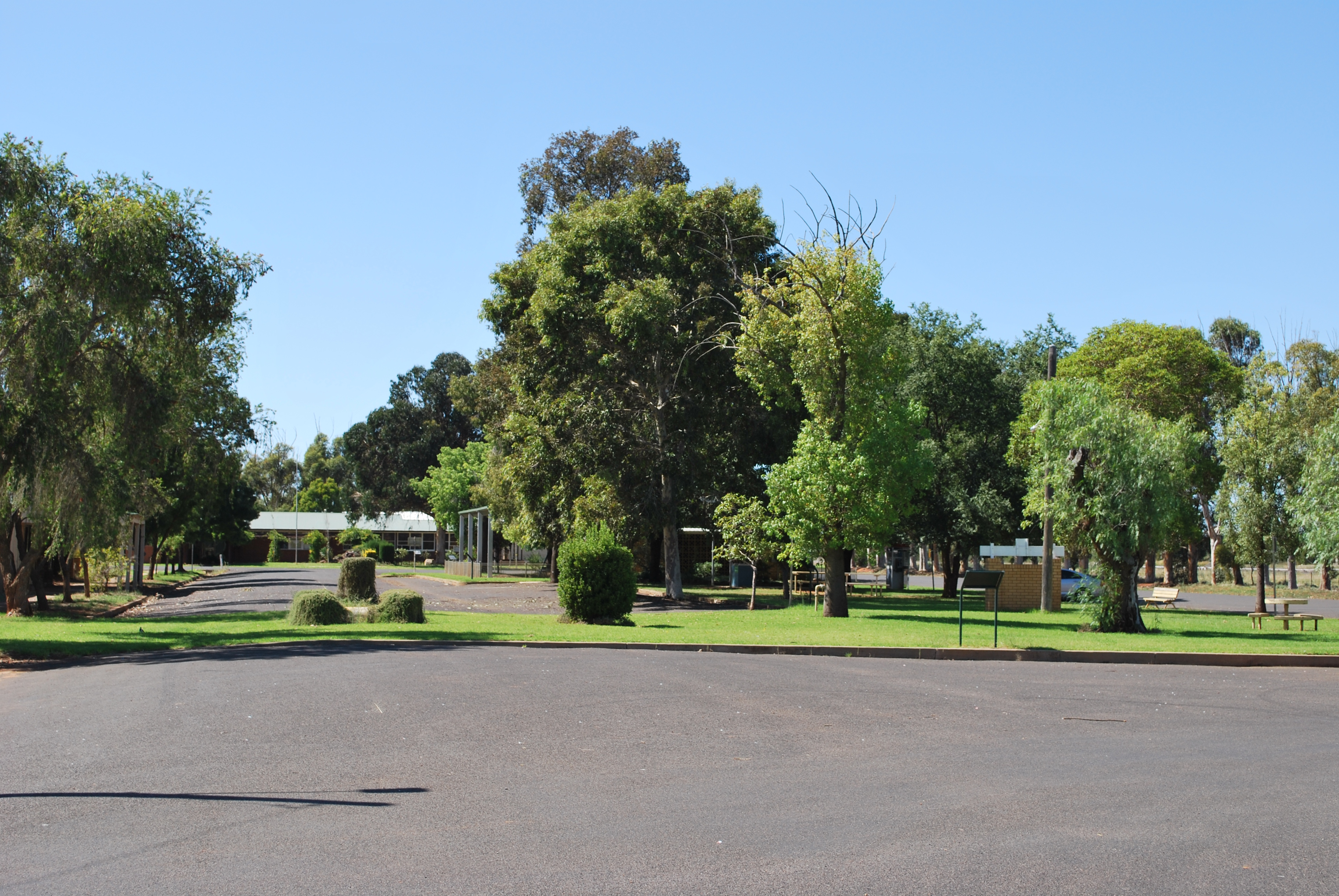
- Comdo Street, Goolgowi

- Coordinates: 33°58′0″S 145°42′0″E
- Country: Australia
- State: New South Wales
- LGA: Carrathool Shire
- Location: 623 km (387 mi) W of Sydney; 530 km (330 mi) N of Melbourne; 50 km (31 mi) NW of Griffith

Government
  - State electorate: Murray
  - Federal division: Farrer

Population
  - Total: 402 (2016 census)
- Postcode: 2652
- County: Nicholson

Goolgowi /ˈɡʊlɡaʊi/ is a small town located in western New South Wales, Australia, around 650 kilometres (400 mi) west of Sydney via the Mid-Western Highway and is the administrative centre of Carrathool Shire. At the 2016 census, Goolgowi had a population of 402.

The town water is supplied via a bore and there is a separate non-potable water supply to each household. It has a primary school and a 25-metre (27 yd) public swimming pool. Other services include a general store, service station, ex-serviceman's club, hotel, two motels, several mechanical workshops and a metal fabrication/engineering business.

The horse racing trainer, T. J. Smith was raised in Goolgowi.

== History ==
The township of Goolgowi began as a railway station and siding along the route of the Griffith to Hillston railway (of which construction began in July 1919 and was completed in late 1922). The "Goolgowie Siding" was situated on "J. Anderson’s improvement lease". During construction of the railway "homestead farms" along the route were set aside "to be disposed of by returned soldiers exclusively", including a number in the parishes of Goolgowie West, Goolgowie South and Bolton.

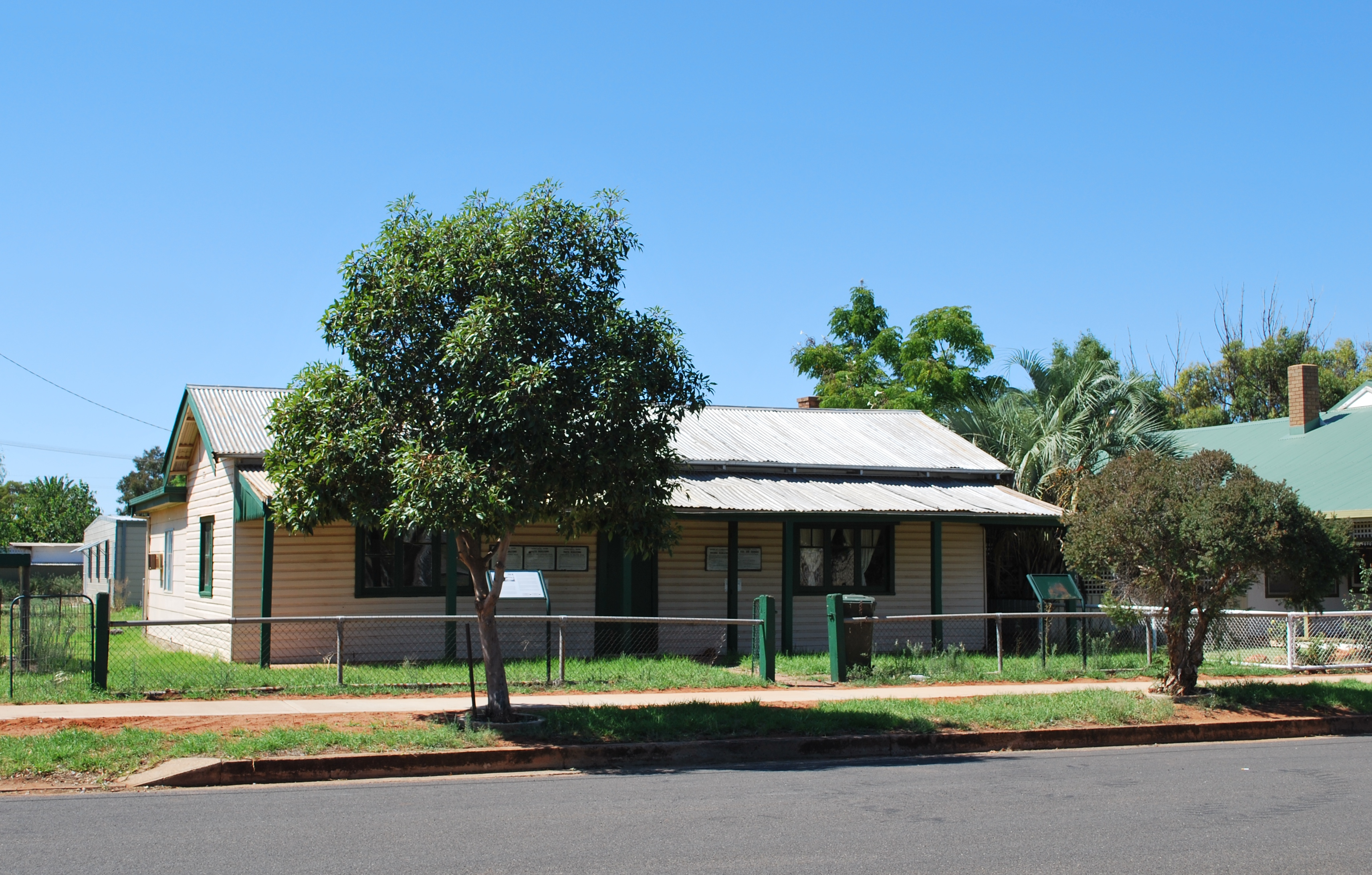
The former council chambers building at Goolgowi, erected within ten weeks in 1934.

The village of Goolgowi and adjoining "suburban lands" was gazetted on 27 February 1925. The land set aside for the village was just under 160 acres north-east of the railway line in the county of Nicholson, parish of Bolton, within the Carrathool Shire local government area.

In May 1925 there was a successful sale of allotments within Goolgowi village. A post office opened at Goolgowi on 12 October 1925.

In May 1934 Carrathool Shire Council voted to remove the shire offices from Carrathool to Goolgowi. The decision was made because Carrathool township was located at the south-west corner of the large shire, whereas Goolgowi was in a more central position. At the time the decision was made "there was no building at Goolgowi which would meet the requirements of the Council". Within three days, however, the residents of Goolgowi had drawn up a plan for a new building which was put before the council. The plans were approved "with some modifications and additions" and "an agreement entered into for the occupancy of the new building". The building was erected within ten weeks on land owned by local resident Stephen Hicks and the new council chambers were opened in July 1934. The council chambers were initially rented from the owner of the property for an annual rent of £78. In December 1948 the council voted to purchase the building from Hicks for £750.

In August 1935 the Hillston Licensing Court approved transfer of George Huntly's hotel license from Mossgiel to Goolgowi, where he proposed to erect a new hotel.

== Gallery ==
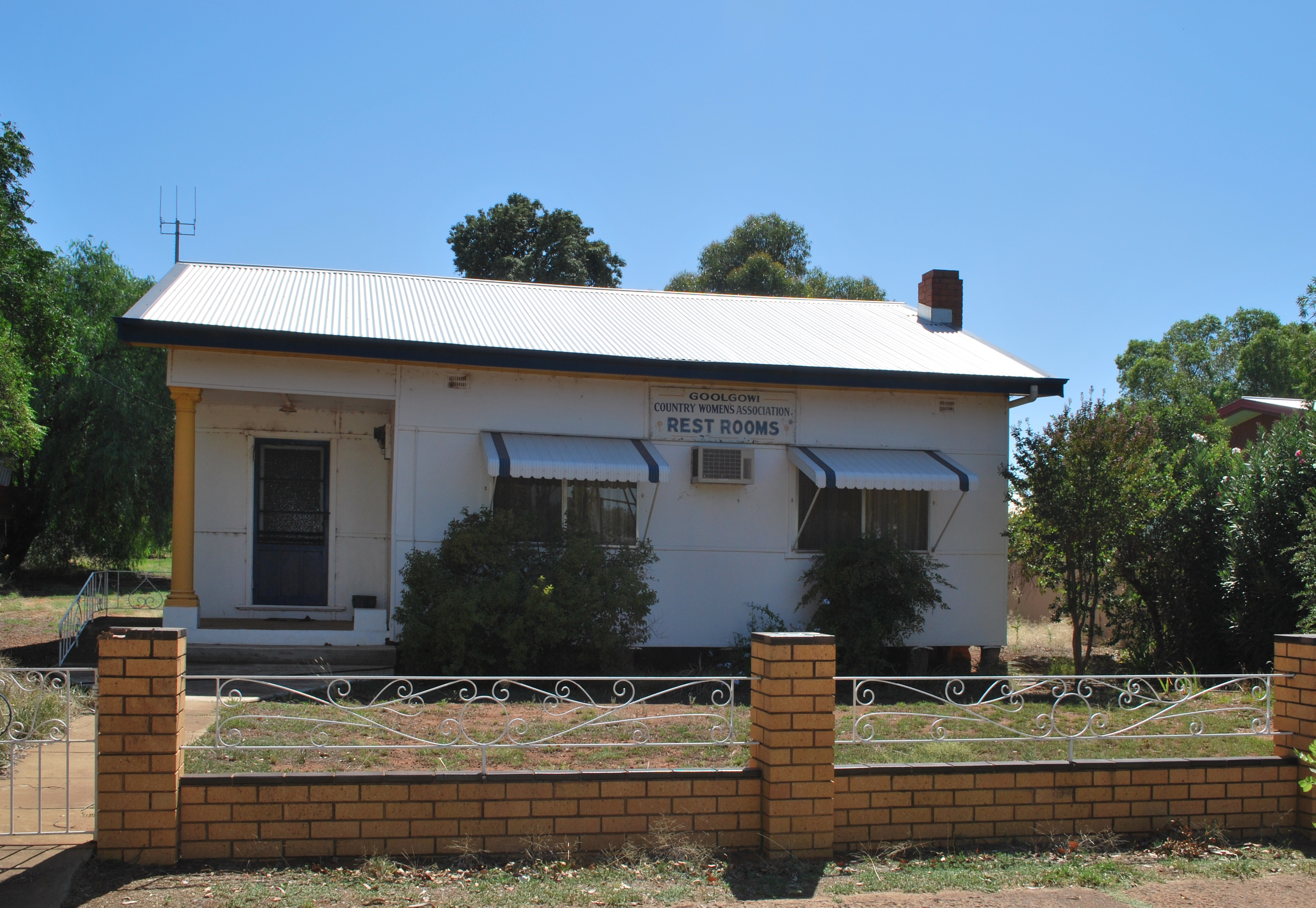
CWA rooms

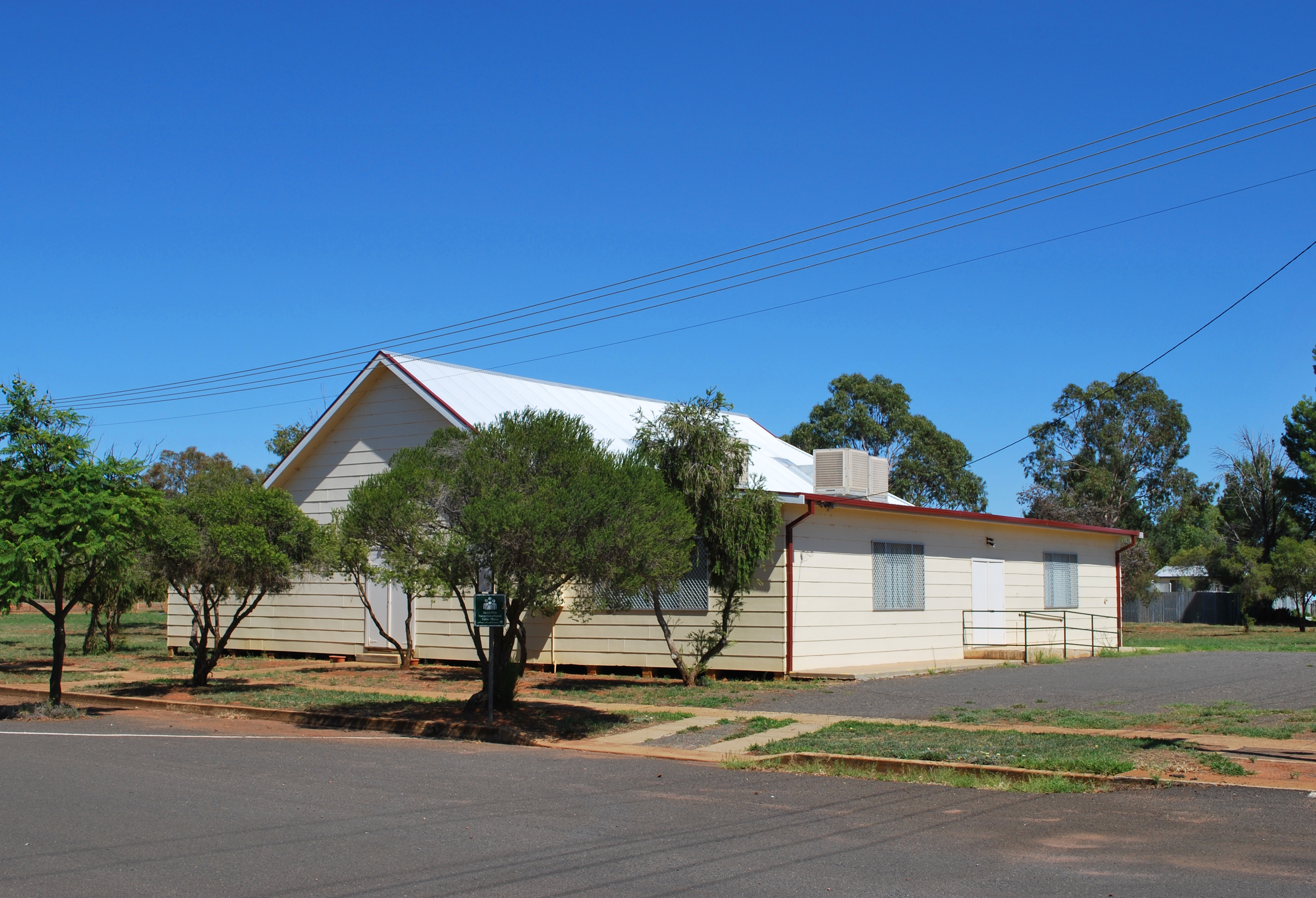
Public hall

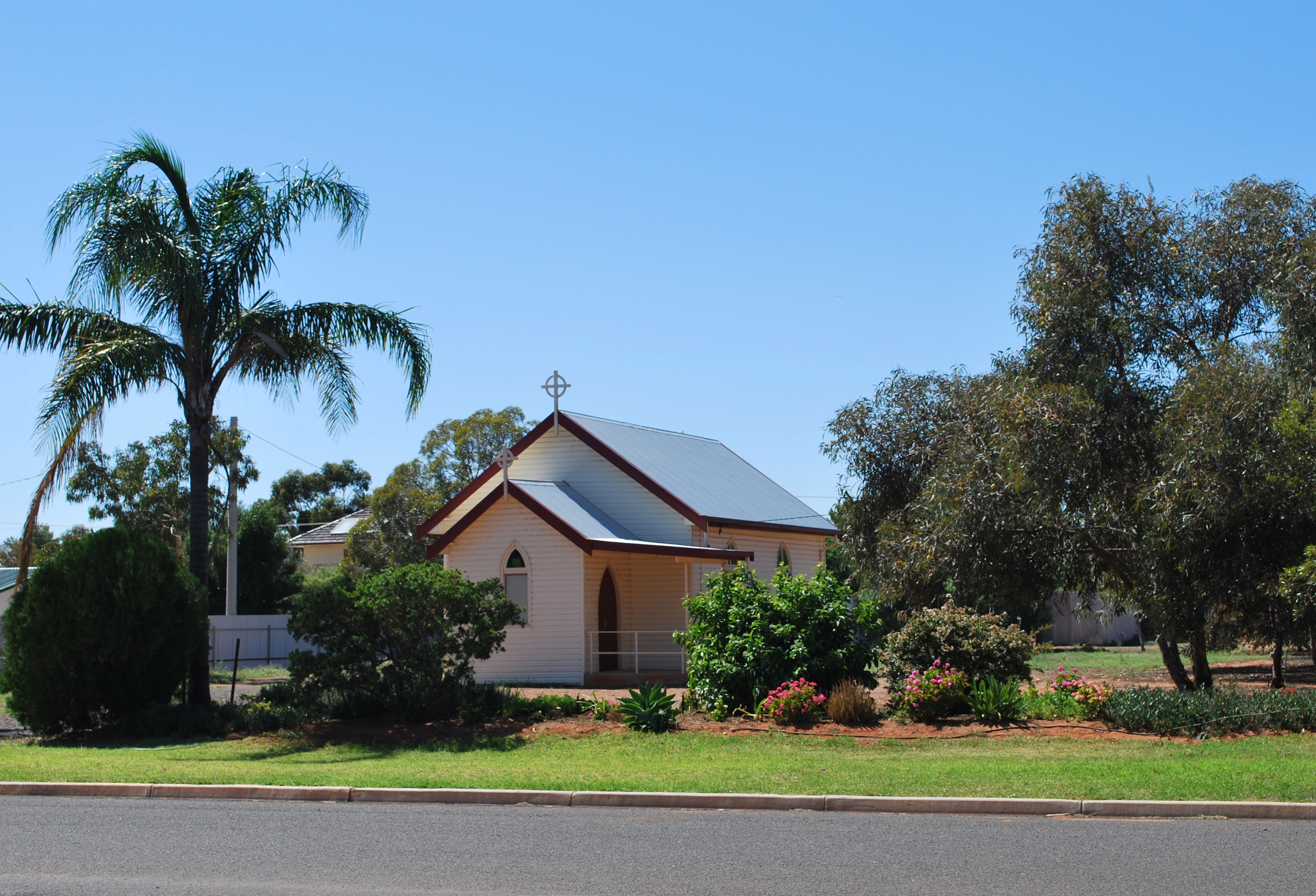
St John Vianney Roman Catholic church
