= Hay Shire =

- Local government area
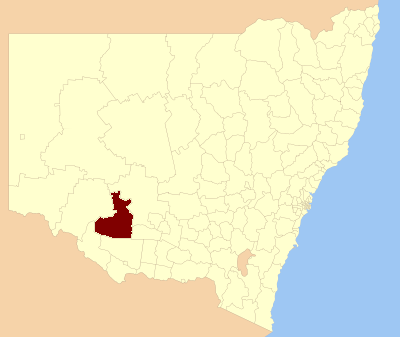
- Location in New South Wales

- Interactive map of Hay Shire
- Coordinates: 34°30′S 144°51′E
- Country: Australia
- State: New South Wales
- Region: Riverina
- Established: 1 January 1965
- Council seat: Hay

Government
  - Mayor: Carol Oataway (Unaligned)
  - State electorate: Murray
  - Federal division: Farrer

Area
  - Total: 11,325.89 km^{2} (4,372.95 sq mi)

Population
  - Total: 2,884 (2021 census)
  - Density: 0.25464/km^{2} (0.65951/sq mi)
- Website: Hay Shire
LGAs around Hay Shire
Balranald	Carrathool	Carrathool
Balranald	Hay Shire	Murrumbidgee
Murray River	Edward River	Edward River

The Hay Shire is a local government area in the Riverina area of south-western New South Wales, Australia. The Shire comprises 11,326 square kilometres (4,373 sq mi) and is located adjacent to the Sturt, Mid-western and Cobb Highways. The area includes the towns of Hay, Booligal and Maude.

Hay Shire was established in 1965 by the amalgamation of the Municipality of Hay with the surrounding Waradgery Shire.

The mayor of Hay Shire is Carol Oataway, an unaligned politician who had previously held the position of Principal of Hay Public School.

== Demographics ==
Selected historical census data for Hay Shire local government area
Census year		2001	2006	2011	2016	2021
Population	Estimated residents on census night	3,562	▼3,383	▼2,956	▼2,946	▼2,884
Population	Aboriginal and/or Torres Strait Islanders (%)	3.5%	▲4.2%	▲5.6%	▲6.0%	▲8.3%
Population	LGA rank in terms of size within New South Wales			123rd	▲121st	121st
Population	% of New South Wales population	0.06%	▼0.05%	▼0.04%	0.04%	0.04%
Population	% of Australian population	0.02%	0.02%	▼0.01%	0.01%	0.01%
Cultural and linguistic diversity		2001	2006	2011	2016	2021
Country of birth (top responses)	Australia	90.4%	▲90.5%	▼88.2%	▼80.3%	▼80.0%
Country of birth (top responses)	India			0.7%	▼0.5%	▲1.3%
Country of birth (top responses)	New Zealand	0.8%	▲1.1%	▼0.8%	▲1.3%	▼1.1%
Country of birth (top responses)	England	1.0%	▼0.8%	▲1.0%	▼0.9%	0.9%
Country of birth (top responses)	Fiji				0.4%	▲0.6%
Country of birth (top responses)	Scotland	0.3%	▲0.4%	0.4%	0.4%	▲0.5%
Language (top responses, other than English)	Italian	1.1%	▼0.8%	▲1.2%	▼0.8%	▼0.7%
Language (top responses, other than English)	Punjabi				▲0.3%	▲0.6%
Language (top responses, other than English)	Fijian	0.2%			▲0.5%	▼0.4%
Language (top responses, other than English)	Afrikaans					0.4%
Language (top responses, other than English)	Malayalam					0.3%
Religious affiliation		2001	2006	2011	2016	2021
Religious affiliation (top responses)	Catholic	36.4%	▼36.1%	▼35.8%	▼31.9%	▼27.6%
Religious affiliation (top responses)	No Religion	7.1%	▲10.4%	▲10.9%	▲16.3%	▲24.3%
Religious affiliation (top responses)	Anglican	31.8%	▼31.1%	31.1%	▼24.7%	▼21.7%
Religious affiliation (top responses)	Not stated	n/c	n/c	n/c	12.8%	▼12.3%
Religious affiliation (top responses)	Presbyterian and Reformed	9.2%	▼7.9%	7.9%	▼5.8%	▼4.8%
Median weekly incomes		2001	2006	2011	2016	2021
Personal income	Median weekly personal income		A$404	A$441	A$587	A$700
Personal income	% of Australian median income		86.7%	▼76.4%	▲88.7%	▼86.9%
Family income	Median weekly family income		A$983	A$981	A$1,344	A$1,622
Family income	% of Australian median income		83.9%	▼66.2%	▲77.5%	▼76.5%
Household income	Median weekly household income		A$741	A$805	A$1,075	A$1,236
Household income	% of Australian median income		72.2%	▼65.2%	▲74.8%	▼70.8%

== Council ==
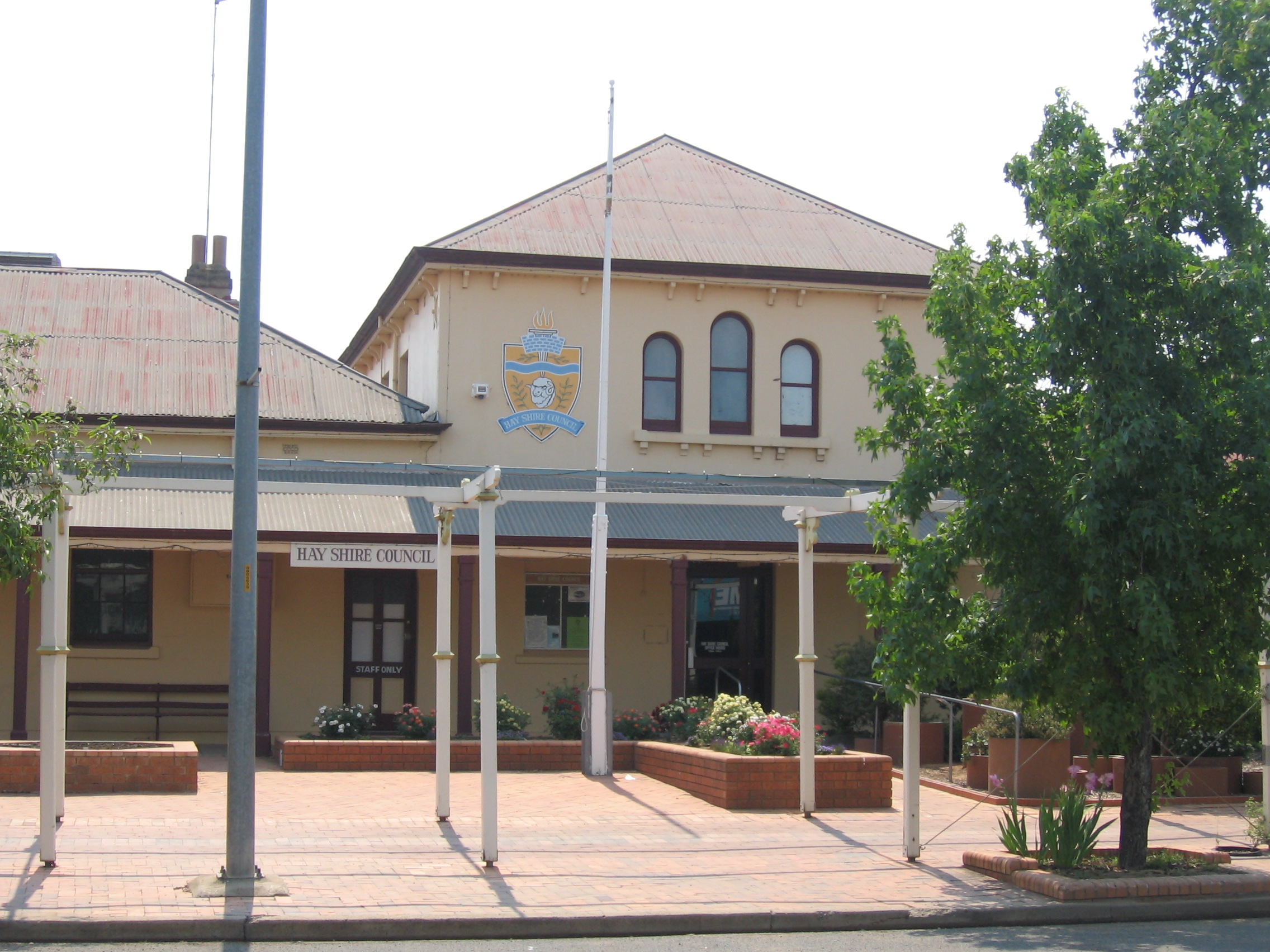
Hay Shire Council office and chambers, Hay

=== Current composition and election method ===
Hay Shire Council is composed of eight councillors elected proportionally as a single ward. All councillors are elected for a fixed four-year term of office. The mayor is elected by the councillors at the first meeting of the council. The most recent election was held on 14 September 2024, and the makeup of the council is as follows:

Party	Councillors
Unaligned	7
Independent	1
Total	8

The current Council was elected in September 2024 . The councillors, in order of election, are:

Councillor	Party	Notes
Carol Oataway	Unaligned	Mayor
Will Miller	Unaligned	
Lionel Garner	Unaligned	
Martyn Quinn	Unaligned	Deputy Mayor
Darren Tapper	Unaligned	
Geoff Chapman	Unaligned	
Paul Porter	Independent	
John Perry	Unaligned	

== Election results ==
=== 2024 ===
2024 New South Wales local elections: Hay
Party	Candidate	Votes	%	±%
Independent	Carol Oataway (elected)	366	22.79	
Independent	Will Miller (elected)	348	21.67	
Independent	Lionel Garner (elected)	200	12.45	
Independent	Martyn Quinn (elected)	197	12.27	
Independent	Darren Tapper (elected)	141	8.78	
Independent	Geoff Chapman (elected)	97	6.04	
Independent	David Townsend	82	5.11	
Independent	Paul Porter (elected)	79	4.92	
Independent	John Perry (elected)	76	4.73	
Independent	Steven Young	20	1.25	
Total formal votes		1,606	100	
Informal votes		55		
Turnout		1,661		

=== 2021 ===
2021 New South Wales local elections: Hay
Party	Candidate	Votes	%	±%
Independent	Jenny Dwyer (elected)	491	28.1	
Independent	Martyn Quinn (elected)	264	15.1	
Independent	Peter Handford (elected)	198	11.3	
Independent	Peter Dwyer (elected)	190	10.9	
Independent	Carol Oataway (elected)	117	6.7	
Independent	Lionel Garner (elected)	103	5.9	
Independent	Geoff Chapman (elected)	90	5.2	
Independent	John Perry	64	3.7	
Independent	Darren Clarke	62	3.5	
Independent	Paul Porter (elected)	57	3.3	
Independent	Beverley McRae	48	2.7	
Independent	David Townsend	33	1.9	
Independent	Megan Ruska	30	1.7	
Total formal votes		1,747	97.4	
Informal votes		47	2.6	
Turnout		1,794	83.6	

== Literary reference ==
Banjo Paterson (1864–1941) wrote a poem called Hay and Hell and Booligal about the district.
