= Carrathool Shire =

- Local government area
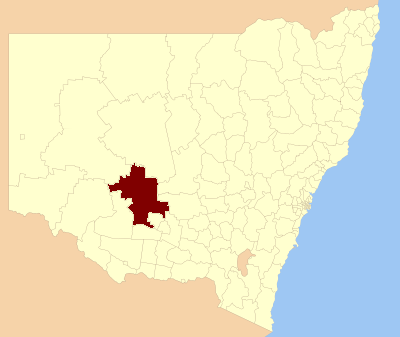
- Location in New South Wales

- Interactive map of Carrathool Shire
- Coordinates: 33°58′S 145°42′E
- Country: Australia
- State: New South Wales
- Region: Riverina and Far West
- Council seat: Goolgowi

Government
  - State electorate: Murray
  - Federal division: Farrer

Area
  - Total: 18,932.61 km^{2} (7,309.92 sq mi)

Population
  - Totals: 2,719 (2016 census); 2,802 (2018 est.)
  - Density: 0.143615/km^{2} (0.37196/sq mi)
- Website: Carrathool Shire
LGAs around Carrathool Shire
Central Darling	Cobar	Lachlan
Balranald	Carrathool Shire	Bland; Narrandera
Hay	Murrumbidgee	Griffith

The Carrathool Shire is a local government area that borders both the Riverina and Far West regions of New South Wales, Australia. The Shire comprises 18,933 square kilometres (7,310 sq mi) and is located adjacent to the Mid-Western Highway and north of the Sturt Highway.

The largest town in the Shire is Hillston and the council seat is Goolgowi. The Shire also includes the villages of Merriwagga, Rankins Springs and Carrathool.

Where once regular droughts made life almost untenable, the area now has irrigated crops, gardens, greened sporting facilities and village verges. Over 15,000 square kilometres (5,800 sq mi) are now used in rural pursuits, including more than 600 square kilometres (230 sq mi) in wheat, rice, vineyards, cotton, potatoes, vegetables and orchard trees. Most of the change was made possible by the widespread use of river and underground water.

== Demographics ==
Selected historical census data for Carrathool Council local government area
Census year		2011	2016	2021
Population	Estimated residents on census night	2,587	▲2,719	▲2,866
Population	LGA rank in terms of size within New South Wales	126th	▲124th	▲123rd
Population	% of New South Wales population	0.04%	0.04%	0.04%
Population	% of Australian population	0.01%	0.01%	0.01%
Cultural and language diversity				
Ancestry, top responses	Australian	35.5%	▼34.6%	▲39.6%
Ancestry, top responses	English	29.8%	▼27.8%	▲34.5%
Ancestry, top responses	Irish	9.6%	▼9.1%	▲10.2%
Ancestry, top responses	Scottish	8.0%	▲8.5%	▲9.1%
Ancestry, top responses	Australian Aboriginal	n/c	n/c	▲8.2%
Language, top responses (other than English)	Punjabi	0.4%	▲0.5%	▲1.3%
Language, top responses (other than English)	Spanish	n/c	n/c	▲1.1%
Language, top responses (other than English)	Malay	n/c	n/c	▲1.0%
Language, top responses (other than English)	Gujarati	n/c	n/c	▲0.9%
Language, top responses (other than English)	Korean	0.5%	▲0.6%	▲0.7%
Religious affiliation				
Religious affiliation, top responses	No religion	13.3%	▲18.1%	▲28.5%
Religious affiliation, top responses	Catholic	31.5%	▼28.0%	▼23.8%
Religious affiliation, top responses	Anglican	24.6%	▼22.4%	▼14.5%
Religious affiliation, top responses	Not stated	n/c	▲9.9%	▲12.7%
Religious affiliation, top responses	Uniting Church	11.6%	▼9.6%	▼6.9%
Median weekly incomes				
Personal income	Median weekly personal income	A$527	A$681	A$837
Personal income	% of Australian median income	91.3%	102.9%	104.0%
Family income	Median weekly family income	A$1143	A$1538	A$1814
Family income	% of Australian median income	77.2%	88.7%	85.6%
Household income	Median weekly household income	A$942	A$1240	A$1516
Household income	% of Australian median income	76.3%	86.2%	86.8%

== History ==
In May 1934 Carrathool Shire Council voted to remove the shire offices from Carrathool to Goolgowi. The decision was made because Carrathool township was located at the south-west corner of the large shire, whereas Goolgowi was in a more central position.

== Council ==
=== Current composition and election method ===
Carrathool Shire Council is composed of ten councillors elected proportionally as two separate wards, each electing five councillors. All councillors are elected for a fixed four-year term of office. The mayor is elected by the councillors at the first meeting of the council. The most recent election was held on 4 December 2021. The makeup of the council is as follows:

Party	Councillors
Independents and Unaligned	10
Total	10

The current Council, elected in 2021, in order of election by ward, is:

Ward	Councillor	Party	Notes
A Ward	Darryl Jardine	Unaligned	Mayor
A Ward	Heather Lyall	Independent	
A Ward	Geoff Peters	Unaligned	
A Ward	David Fensom	Independent	
A Ward	Julie Potter	Unaligned	
B Ward	Mick Armstrong	Unaligned	
B Ward	Leon Cashmere	Unaligned	
B Ward	Beverley Furner	Unaligned	Deputy Mayor
B Ward	William Kite	Independent	
B Ward	Damon Liddicoat	Unaligned	

== Election results ==
=== 2024 ===
2024 New South Wales local elections: Carrathool
Party	Votes	%	Swing	Seats	Change
Independents	1,291	100%	Steady	10	Steady
Formal votes	1,291	96.49%			
Informal votes	47	3.51%			
Total	1,338				
Registered voters / turnout	1,800	73.44%			

=== 2021 ===
2021 New South Wales local elections: Carrathool
Party	Votes	%	Swing	Seats	Change
Independents	694	100.0	+0.0	10	Steady
Formal votes	694	97.9			
Informal votes	15	2.1			
Total	709	100.00			
Registered voters / turnout	1,792	39.56			

=== 2016 ===
2021 New South Wales local elections: Carrathool
Party	Votes	%	Swing	Seats	Change
Independents	0	0.0		10	Steady
Registered voters / turnout	1,913	0.0			
