= Harry Power =

Irish-born Australian bushranger (1819–1891)

Henry Johnson
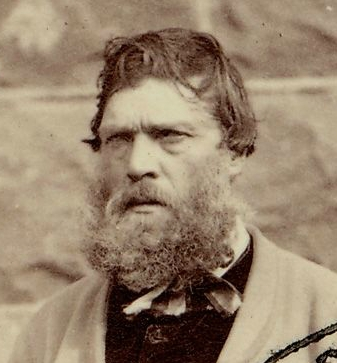
- Power in the 1870s
- Born: c. 1820; County Waterford, Ireland
- Died: c. 11 October 1891 (aged about 72); Swan Hill, Colony of Victoria, Australia
- Convictions: 1840 – 7 years transportation 1855 – 13 years 1864 – 7 years

Henry Johnson (c. 1820 – c. 11 October 1891), better known by his alias Harry Power, was an Irish-born convict who became a bushranger in Australia. From 1869 to 1870, he was accompanied by a young Ned Kelly, who went on to become Australia's best known bushranger.

Power escaped from Pentridge Prison twice, in 1862 and 1869. He was known for his affable demeanour and sense of flair, as well as the fact that he never killed any of his targets.

== Early life ==
Henry Johnson (Note: Also known as Johnston or Johnstone) was born in County Waterford, Ireland around 1820. One source gives the exact date of 18 May 1819.

Johnson and his family moved to England in the 1830s. He worked as a piecer at the Woolen Mills in Ashton-under-Lyne, Lancashire. When he was only sixteen years of age his father had him apprenticed to the saddler trade. His education consisted chiefly of learning to horseback ride. Later he joined the peasants in their conflicts with British troops. It was during this time that he received sabre wounds on his face, which are described in the Victorian police records as, "scar over right eyebrow, scars on right cheek."

== Transportation ==
Johnson was convicted at Salford, Lancashire, on 31 August 1840 for stealing a pair of shoes, and was sentenced to transportation for seven years. He arrived in Hobart on the Isabella on 21 May 1842. (Note: In a 1877 interview, Power was "particularly reticent as to his early years". He claimed to have been a free man, originally from County Waterford, who emigrated to Australia from America.)

Johnson received a ticket of leave in November 1847, and a certificate of freedom in September 1848. He subsequently moved to the Colony of Victoria and became a horse-dealer at Geelong. Power was engaged driving cattle all over Victoria and New South Wales, and later joined a party led by Captain Joseph Denman in exploring and cutting a track across the ranges. He became skilled at navigating the bush.

== Prison ==
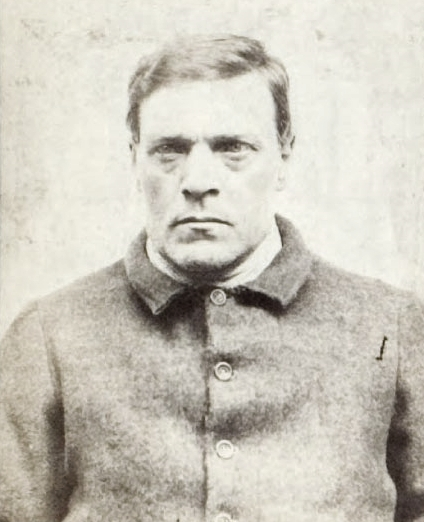
Henry Johnson, photographed in the 1850s

=== 1855 conviction ===
In March 1855, Johnson was stopped by two troopers at Daisy Hill, near Maryborough, on suspicion of horse-stealing. A conflict occurred and Johnson wounded one of the men. Johnson claimed that he rightfully owned the horse, and that the two troopers, Germans, were drunk. One week later he was arrested attempting to cross the Murray River.

"I was going along quietly, when down came the two troopers, hooting and shouting. I saw they were drunk, and pulled on one side, but they stopped me. 'Whose horse is that?' says one. 'It's mine,' says I. 'Are you going to shout?' says the other. 'No,' says I, for I didn't like the Germans. 'I believe you stole that horse,' says the first.' 'You're a liar,' says I. ' You'll have to come along with us,' says the other. 'I won't do it,' says I, getting riled. On that one of them drew his hanger, and said he'd make me. 'You can't,' says I. He charged at me, and I'd only just time to draw my revolver, or he'd have cut me down. I shot him, and then the other fellow rode up and fired at me, and the powder singed my coat. I shot him, and then rode off. Now, if I had been sensible, I'd have ridden off to the nearest police station and given myself up. But I was frightened, and rode across the colony, thinking to go and stay in New South Wales till the row was over. At the Murray I was stopped. I did not deny my name or resist. They arrested and brought me down to Melbourne, and I got 10 years. The men were not hurt much, and it was proved they stopped me without cause, or I'd have got more."

— Harry Power, in a 1877 interview

On 25 September 1855, Johnson was sentenced to thirteen years on the roads and confined to the prison hulk Success. Johnson was among those implicated in the murder of Owen Owens and John Turner on 22 October 1856, but was found not guilty.

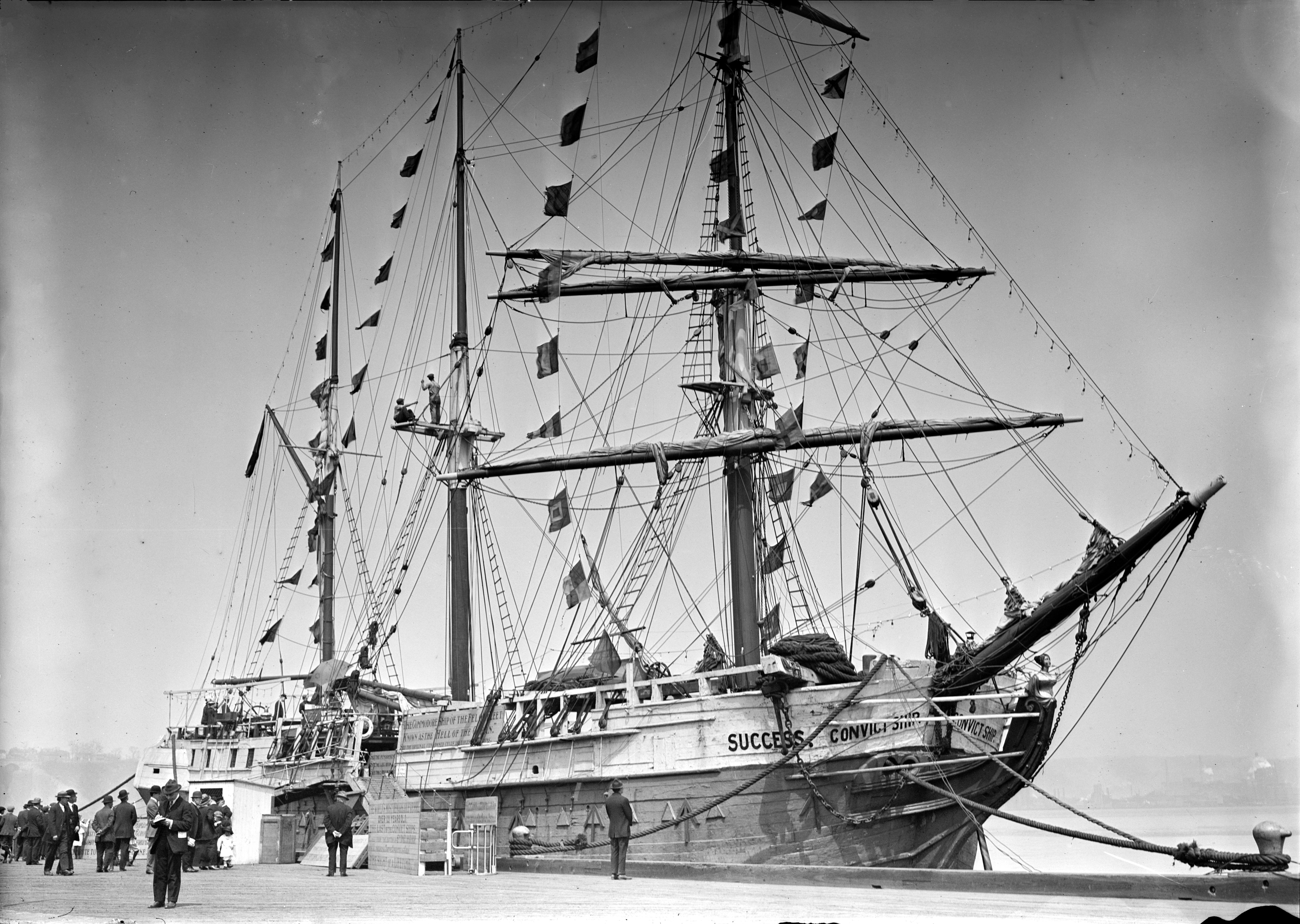
After his release in 1885, Power worked on the former prison hulk Success when it became a museum ship.

=== Escapes from Pentridge Prison ===
After two and a half years in the hulks, Johnson was transferred to Pentridge Prison. He escaped Pentridge in 1862 by hiding in a rubbish cart. Johnson lived at Middle Creek in the Ovens District; there he was assisted by the Kelly, Quinn and Lloyd families. Johnson was later arrested for horse-stealing, and on 19 February 1864, he was sentenced at Beechworth to seven years on the roads.

Johnson made his second escape from Pentridge Prison on 16 February 1869. Whilst helping a group of convicts build a wall, he noticed a grassy hollow in the wall and hid there when the guards escorted the group back to gaol. He subsequently escaped in the direction of Merri Creek and took refuge above the Glenmore homestead with old friends.

== Bushranger ==
Johnson turned to highway robbery and became a bushranger. By 1869 he was calling himself Harry Power.

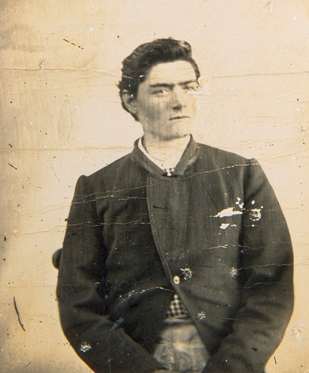
Power mentored Ned Kelly (photographed in 1871), who became Australia's best-known bushranger.

Harry Power was assisted briefly by Ned Kelly, the young teenage son of poor Irish immigrants. The Kelly family sympathised with Power, and by May 1869 Ned Kelly had become his bushranging protégé.

That month, the duo attempted to steal horses from the Mansfield property of squatter John Rowe as part of a plan to rob the Woods Point–Mansfield gold escort. They abandoned the idea after Rowe shot at them, and Kelly temporarily broke off his association with Power. Power ultimately proved to be unsatisfied with Kelly and later worked solo.

On 7 May, Power held up the mail-coach at Porepunkah. On 22 May, he held up yet another coach on Longwood-Mansfield Road. Power claimed to have committed over 600 robberies in 1869, with these robberies being the first. Within four months of his escape, Power had stuck up a mail-coach three times. On the Saturday morning before 31 August, he stopped the Buckland coach on a public road, within 8 km (5 mi) of the Ovens district, and for three hours stopped all travellers through that area. Power later boasted that, despite attempts by police to capture him, he visited Beechworth undetected and enjoyed a drink at a hotel.

Power was not caught, despite his recognisable appearance; the third finger on his left hand was deformed, and he had trouble walking due to bunions on his feet which required oversized boots. Power would sometimes commit robberies a 160 kilometres (100 mi) apart in the span of a single day. A major factor in why Power was not caught was due to the unorganised and small local police force.

In September 1869, the Victorian government offered a reward of £200 for Power's arrest; the amount was soon increased to £500. Power subsequently moved to New South Wales. There were claims that during these robberies Power had a young assistant who took care of the horses. Suspicion fell on Kelly. However he soon returned to Victoria.

In March 1870, Power and Kelly held squatter and magistrate Robert McBean at gunpoint at his property Kilfera and forced him to turn over his watch.

Power robbed both rich and poor alike. He held up stagecoaches, farmhouses, liquor stores, solo travellers and itinerant workers. He also set fire to a store in Gundagai, stole a young boy's comforter at gunpoint, and heavily beat a Chinese worker for not obeying him. Power boasted that he loved robbing from farmhouses and would visit them when the farmer had left for work and the wife was home alone.

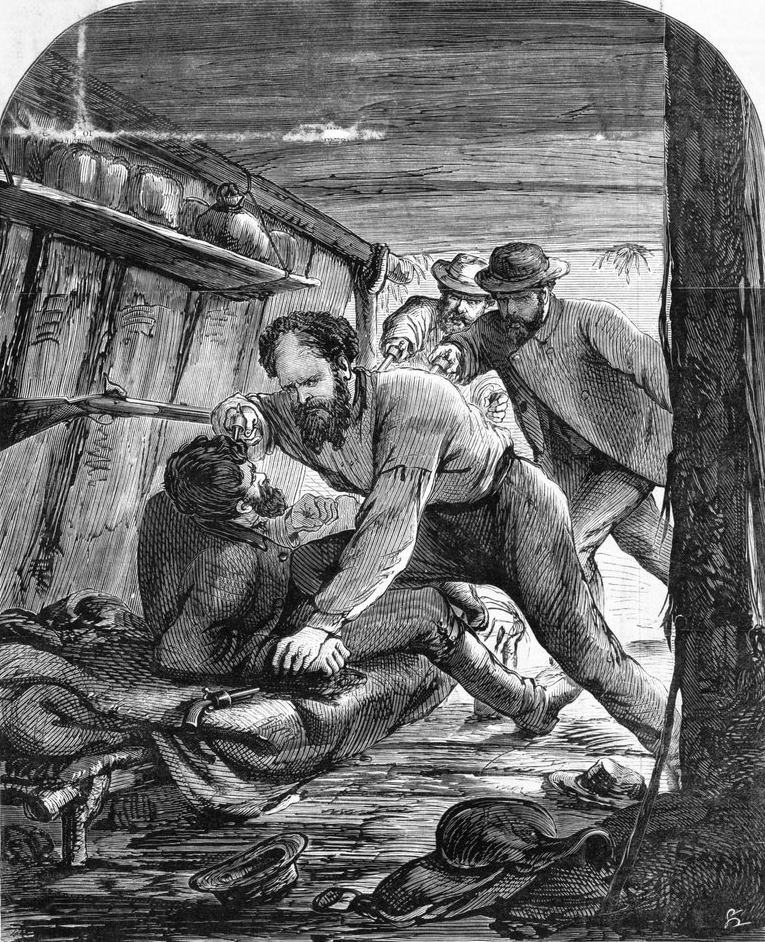
Capture of Power, 1870

Police efforts to capture him proved fruitless until Power was captured on 5 June 1870 by Superintendents Nicolson and Hare with Sergeant Montford and a black tracker. The group surprised Power in his hide-out (Power's Lookout) whilst he was sleeping in a hut on the Glenmore Run which was squatted by the Quinn family, Ned Kelly's grandparents and uncles. The police were led to the hideout by James Quinn, who received the £500 reward. Power believed Ned Kelly had betrayed him. Power was sentenced at Beechworth to 15 years hard labour, on three counts of bushranging. He was once again imprisoned at Pentridge.

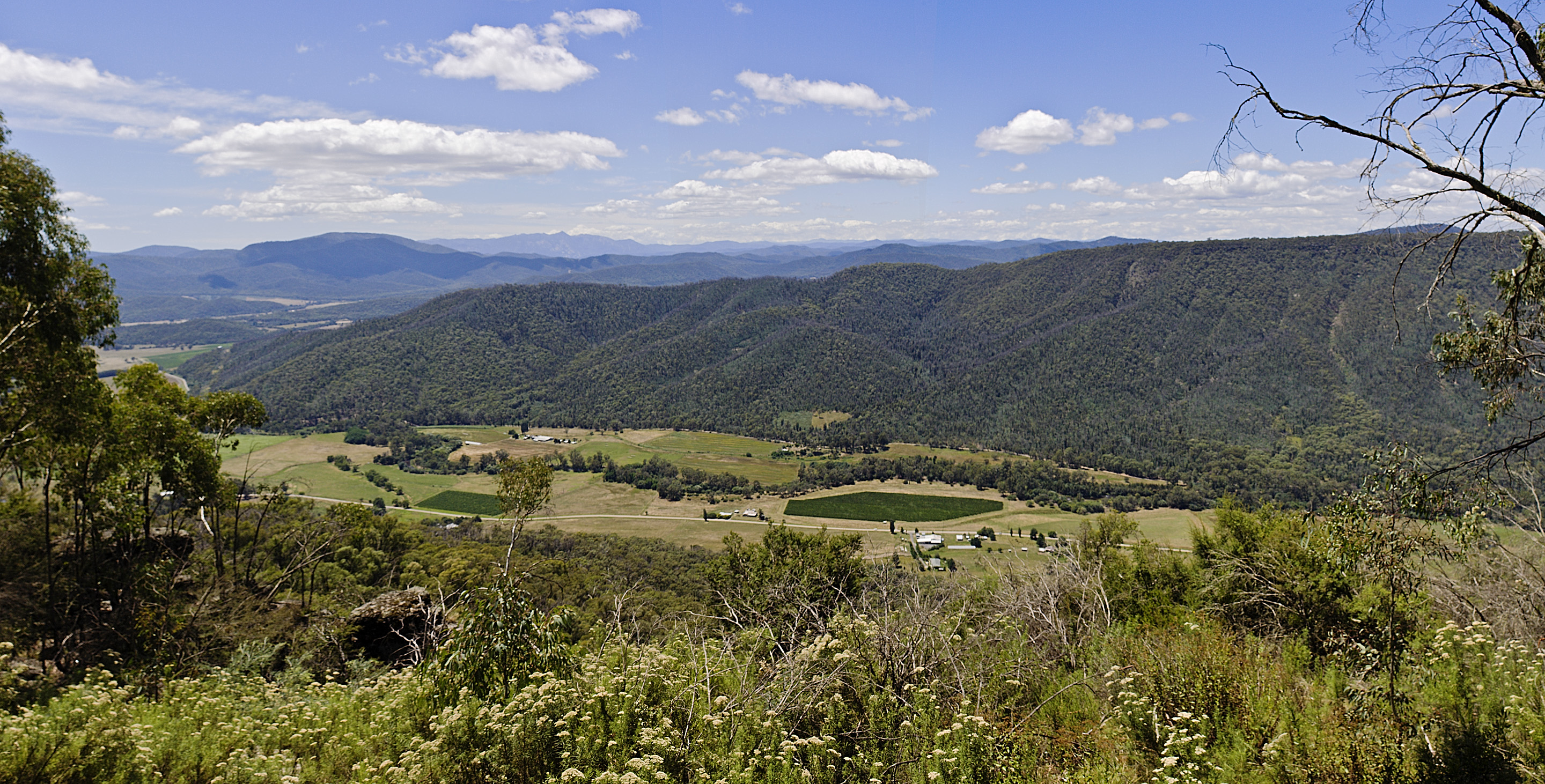
View from Power's Lookout.

== Later life ==
By March 1877, Power was "sick nearly unto death" in prison. He was described as slight, weak and grey. He was not released from prison until 9 February 1885, aged 66, on the application of several women, including socialite Janet Clarke. He worked on the Clarke property at Sunbury, then in 1891 he became a guide on the old Prison Hulk Success (on which he had once served a sentence) which was by then a museum.

In late 1891 Power fell into the Murray River and drowned at Swan Hill, possibly while fishing. His corpse was discovered at Tyntynder. On 8 November (a few days after the discovery), the drowned man was identified as Harry Power. It was determined that he died "on or about 11 October". One contemporary newspaper alleged that Power had committed suicide, but this is considered unlikely.

== Legacy ==
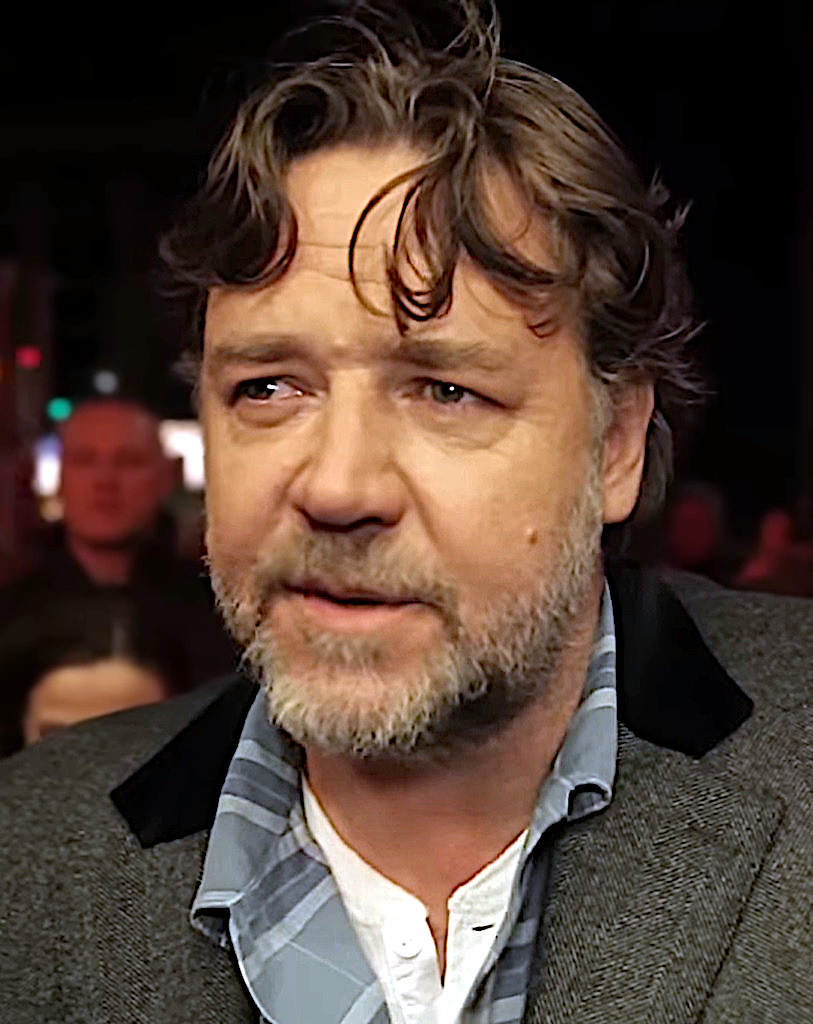
Russell Crowe portrayed Power in the 2019 film True History of the Kelly Gang.

Power's Lookout Reserve near Whitfield, Victoria, is named after Harry Power.

Power's relationship with Kelly is depicted in the 1980 miniseries The Last Outlaw, where he was played by Gerard Kennedy. The relationship is also depicted in Peter Carey's Booker Prize-winning novel True History of the Kelly Gang. In the 2019 film adaptation of the novel, Power was portrayed by Russell Crowe, opposite Orlando Schwerdt as a young Ned Kelly.
