= Waljeers County =

Waljeers New South Wales
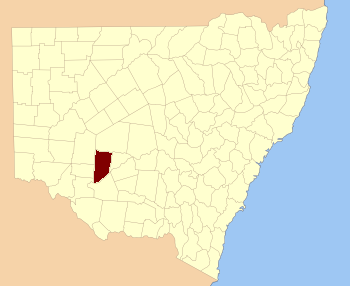
- Location in New South Wales
Lands administrative divisions around Waljeers:
Manara	Mossgiel	Mossgiel
Kilfera	Waljeers	Franklin
Caira	Waradgery	Nicholson

Waljeers County is one of the 141 cadastral divisions of New South Wales. It contains the town of Booligal.

The name Waljeers is derived from a local Aboriginal word of the Muthi Muthi tribe.

Lake Waljeers is one of largest lakes located north of the Lachlan River and the river crossing at Thellangering.

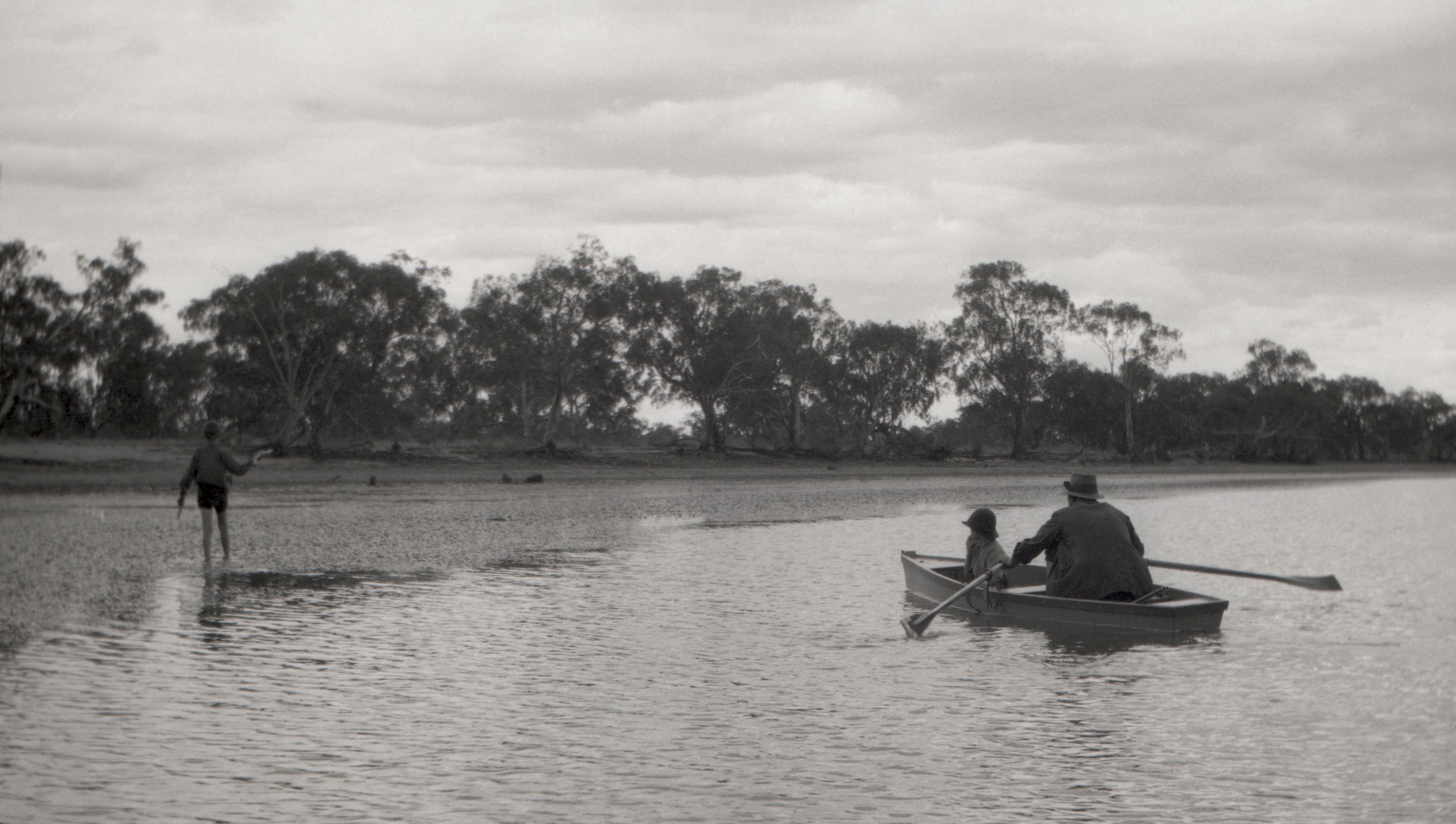
Fishing on Lake Waljeers

== Parishes within this county ==
A full list of parishes found within this county; their current LGA and mapping coordinates to the approximate centre of each location is as follows:

Parish	LGA	Coordinates
Abbotsford	Central Darling Shire	33°13′50″S 144°19′26″E
Alma	Balranald Shire	33°23′34″S 144°16′18″E
Annan	Carrathool Shire	33°21′04″S 144°39′15″E
Arrawatta	Balranald Shire	33°43′41″S 144°28′14″E
Avondale	Carrathool Shire	33°24′02″S 144°25′43″E
Benanimie	Hay Shire	33°51′50″S 144°49′35″E
Billabong	Carrathool Shire	33°20′21″S 144°25′52″E
Boondara	Carrathool Shire	33°17′23″S 144°39′13″E
Brassbutt	Balranald Shire	34°07′21″S 144°23′39″E
Buckonyong	Balranald Shire	34°06′37″S 144°09′18″E
Bulgarbugerygam	Balranald Shire	33°42′33″S 144°14′07″E
Bullogal	Balranald Shire	33°55′09″S 144°31′18″E
Bungarry	Balranald Shire	34°03′30″S 144°17′00″E
Campbell	Carrathool Shire	33°29′14″S 144°30′18″E
Carngham	Hay Shire	33°32′02″S 144°37′36″E
Corrong	Balranald Shire	34°09′20″S 144°29′39″E
Culparling	Balranald Shire	33°30′33″S 144°15′37″E
Culpataro	Balranald Shire	33°37′36″S 144°23′51″E
Dimboola	Balranald Shire	33°57′34″S 144°28′54″E
Ellisland	Balranald Shire	33°16′40″S 144°18′56″E
Goona Warra	Hay Shire	33°59′57″S 144°39′07″E
Gregory	Balranald Shire	33°56′28″S 144°10′41″E
Howatson	Carrathool Shire	33°20′35″S 144°46′29″E
Kingswell	Hay Shire	33°34′27″S 144°44′50″E
Lagan	Balranald Shire	34°05′09″S 144°23′59″E
Largs	Carrathool Shire	33°21′03″S 144°32′01″E
Larnaca	Hay Shire	33°35′46″S 144°34′53″E
Lowan	Central Darling Shire	33°14′09″S 144°29′03″E
Marowie	Balranald Shire	33°52′18″S 144°26′53″E
Massie	Hay Shire	33°42′56″S 144°44′18″E
Matamong	Balranald Shire	34°03′36″S 144°29′21″E
Mekai	Carrathool Shire	33°22′51″S 144°45′57″E
Merrimajeel	Hay Shire	33°55′29″S 144°37′39″E
Moodarnong	Hay Shire	33°49′29″S 144°48′57″E
Mossgiel	Central Darling Shire	33°10′56″S 144°35′50″E
Mulloga	Balranald Shire	34°06′02″S 144°16′36″E
Murnia	Carrathool Shire	33°14′06″S 144°48′40″E
Murra	Hay Shire	33°45′38″S 144°35′19″E
Nandum	Balranald Shire	34°00′49″S 144°10′00″E
Natue	Hay Shire	33°50′51″S 144°42′21″E
Nyanda	Hay Shire	33°48′42″S 144°42′51″E
Pimpara	Balranald Shire	34°11′48″S 144°22′20″E
Sebastopol	Balranald Shire	33°46′04″S 144°22′30″E
Simson	Central Darling Shire	
St Andrew	Hay Shire	33°33′06″S 144°30′50″E
Tarrawong	Balranald Shire	33°52′40″S 144°13′16″E
Tartoo	Hay Shire	33°41′16″S 144°38′32″E
Tinna	Hay Shire	33°47′42″S 144°34′57″E
Toms Lake	Hay Shire	33°38′17″S 144°45′04″E
Toopruck	Balranald Shire	34°13′41″S 144°15′47″E
Tooralboung	Balranald Shire	34°10′16″S 144°09′00″E
Trawalla	Central Darling Shire	33°12′12″S 144°44′25″E
Tyson	Balranald Shire	33°50′08″S 144°22′20″E
Waljeers	Balranald Shire	34°03′10″S 144°36′27″E
Waverley	Carrathool Shire	33°25′08″S 144°39′00″E
Wickham	Balranald Shire	33°27′51″S 144°16′03″E
Willandra	Central Darling Shire	33°09′18″S 144°20′11″E
Wyunga	Balranald Shire	34°00′37″S 144°20′14″E
Yaloo	Hay Shire	33°57′06″S 144°44′07″E
Yarto	Hay Shire	33°27′26″S 144°45′58″E
