= Caira County =

Caira New South Wales
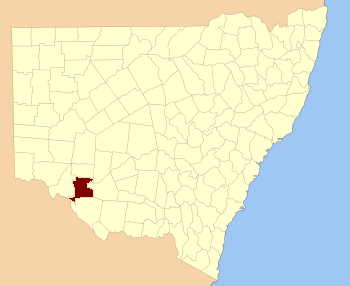
- Location in New South Wales
Lands administrative divisions around Caira:
Taila County	Kilfera County	Waljeers County
Taila County	Caira	Waradgery County
Tatchera (Vic)	Wakool County	Wakool County

Caira County is one of the 141 cadastral divisions of New South Wales. It contains the city of Balranald. It is located between where the Murrumbidgee River joins the Murray River to where the Lachlan River joins the Murrumbidgee, containing much of the western Lowbidgee Floodplain. The name "Caira" is believed to derive from a local Aboriginal word.

== Parishes within this county ==
A full list of parishes found within this county; their current LGA and mapping coordinates to the approximate centre of each location is as follows:

Parish	LGA	Coordinates
Bahpunga	Hay Shire	34°34′54″S 144°09′04″E
Ballah	Balranald Shire	34°20′27″S 143°31′36″E
Balranald	Balranald Shire	34°36′35″S 143°34′57″E
Belaimong	Balranald Shire	34°09′04″S 143°50′33″E
Belar	Murray River Council	34°43′54″S 143°40′04″E
Benongal	Balranald Shire	34°43′54″S 143°31′04″E
Bidura	Balranald Shire	34°08′05″S 143°19′47″E
Bluff	Hay Shire	34°42′54″S 144°04′04″E
Boocathan	Balranald Shire	34°08′41″S 144°01′57″E
Budgerie	Balranald Shire	34°12′09″S 143°27′10″E
Bunumburt	Balranald Shire	34°11′27″S 143°54′19″E
Chadwick	Balranald Shire	34°43′54″S 143°30′04″E
Chadwick	Balranald Shire	34°45′44″S 143°29′56″E
Chillichill	Balranald Shire	34°07′24″S 143°55′10″E
Cooncoonburra	Balranald Shire	34°21′33″S 143°39′47″E
Crokee	Balranald Shire	34°26′40″S 143°24′26″E
Davy	Balranald Shire	34°13′17″S 143°43′45″E
Derinum	Hay Shire	34°28′54″S 144°14′04″E
Fisher	Murray River Council	34°44′02″S 143°50′30″E
Ganaway	Balranald Shire	34°18′11″S 143°36′59″E
Geraki	Balranald Shire	34°14′55″S 143°33′11″E
Glen Emu	Balranald Shire	34°11′44″S 143°36′43″E
Impimi	Murray River Council	34°43′54″S 143°45′04″E
Jeraly	Hay Shire	34°39′54″S 144°05′04″E
Jippay	Balranald Shire	34°13′35″S 143°49′31″E
Juanbung	Balranald Shire	
Kerrish	Balranald Shire	34°17′10″S 143°43′37″E
Kia	Murray River Council	34°40′54″S 143°45′04″E
Kieeta	Murray River Council	34°35′54″S 143°41′04″E
Kingi	Balranald Shire	34°37′13″S 143°28′42″E
Lawrence	Balranald Shire	34°31′28″S 143°27′17″E
Lincoln	Hay Shire	34°37′08″S 144°02′07″E
Loocalle	Balranald Shire	34°30′37″S 143°16′39″E
Loorica	Murray River Council	34°28′54″S 143°52′04″E
Macpherson	Balranald Shire	34°15′00″S 143°17′40″E
Mamanga	Balranald Shire	34°43′01″S 143°33′15″E
Maremley	Balranald Shire	34°24′59″S 143°40′59″E
Mevna	Balranald Shire	34°38′21″S 143°22′45″E
Monkem	Murray River Council	34°23′54″S 143°46′04″E
Monkem	Murray River Council	34°25′33″S 143°47′39″E
Morris	Murray River Council	34°37′54″S 143°47′04″E
Muckee	Balranald Shire	34°27′20″S 143°30′57″E
Nap Nap	Murray River Council	34°20′54″S 143°52′04″E
Narahquong	Balranald Shire	34°21′33″S 143°47′33″E
Nicholson	Hay Shire	34°33′54″S 144°14′04″E
Nimming	Hay Shire	34°27′54″S 144°09′04″E
Nullawong	Balranald Shire	34°04′26″S 143°36′14″E
Paika	Balranald Shire	34°31′03″S 143°37′34″E
Parker	Murray River Council	34°40′54″S 143°50′04″E
Parker	Murray River Council	34°40′20″S 143°50′41″E
Penarie	Balranald Shire	34°25′23″S 143°35′10″E
Pitarpunga	Balranald Shire	34°19′47″S 143°25′06″E
Pollen	Hay Shire	34°30′38″S 144°02′18″E
Pungmallee	Hay Shire	34°26′23″S 144°05′15″E
Pybolee	Hay Shire	34°27′54″S 143°56′04″E
Quianderry	Balranald Shire	34°16′42″S 143°59′23″E
Ronald	Balranald Shire	34°26′30″S 143°16′51″E
Rookery	Hay Shire	34°38′54″S 144°10′04″E
Russell	Hay Shire	34°37′54″S 144°13′04″E
St Pauls	Hay Shire	34°41′54″S 144°09′04″E
Tala	Murray River Council	34°34′54″S 143°47′04″E
Talpee	Murray River Council	34°27′54″S 143°42′04″E
Tararie	Balranald Shire	34°51′05″S 143°25′30″E
Telford	Hay Shire	34°39′43″S 143°59′22″E
The Oaks	Hay Shire	34°42′54″S 144°13′04″E
The Willows	Murray River Council	34°41′54″S 143°56′04″E
Tintin	Balranald Shire	34°17′24″S 143°25′29″E
Toorong	Balranald Shire	34°13′23″S 144°00′58″E
Tuyerunby	Hay Shire	34°23′54″S 143°56′04″E
Tyson	Balranald Shire	34°18′48″S 143°53′42″E
Waldaira	Balranald Shire	34°40′33″S 143°17′57″E
Waugorah	Murray River Council	34°25′54″S 143°52′04″E
Weimby	Balranald Shire	34°44′01″S 143°16′10″E
Williamson	Murray River Council	34°35′54″S 143°53′04″E
Wilpee	Murray River Council	34°27′54″S 143°46′04″E
Windomal	Balranald Shire	34°43′41″S 143°22′26″E
Wombah	Murray River Council	34°46′34″S 143°34′34″E
Yanga	Murray River Council	34°40′54″S 143°40′04″E
Yarrington	Balranald Shire	34°34′16″S 143°32′38″E
Yarrowal	Balranald Shire	34°27′37″S 143°40′14″E
Yough	Balranald Shire	34°06′39″S 143°45′26″E
