= Waljeers, Waljeers =

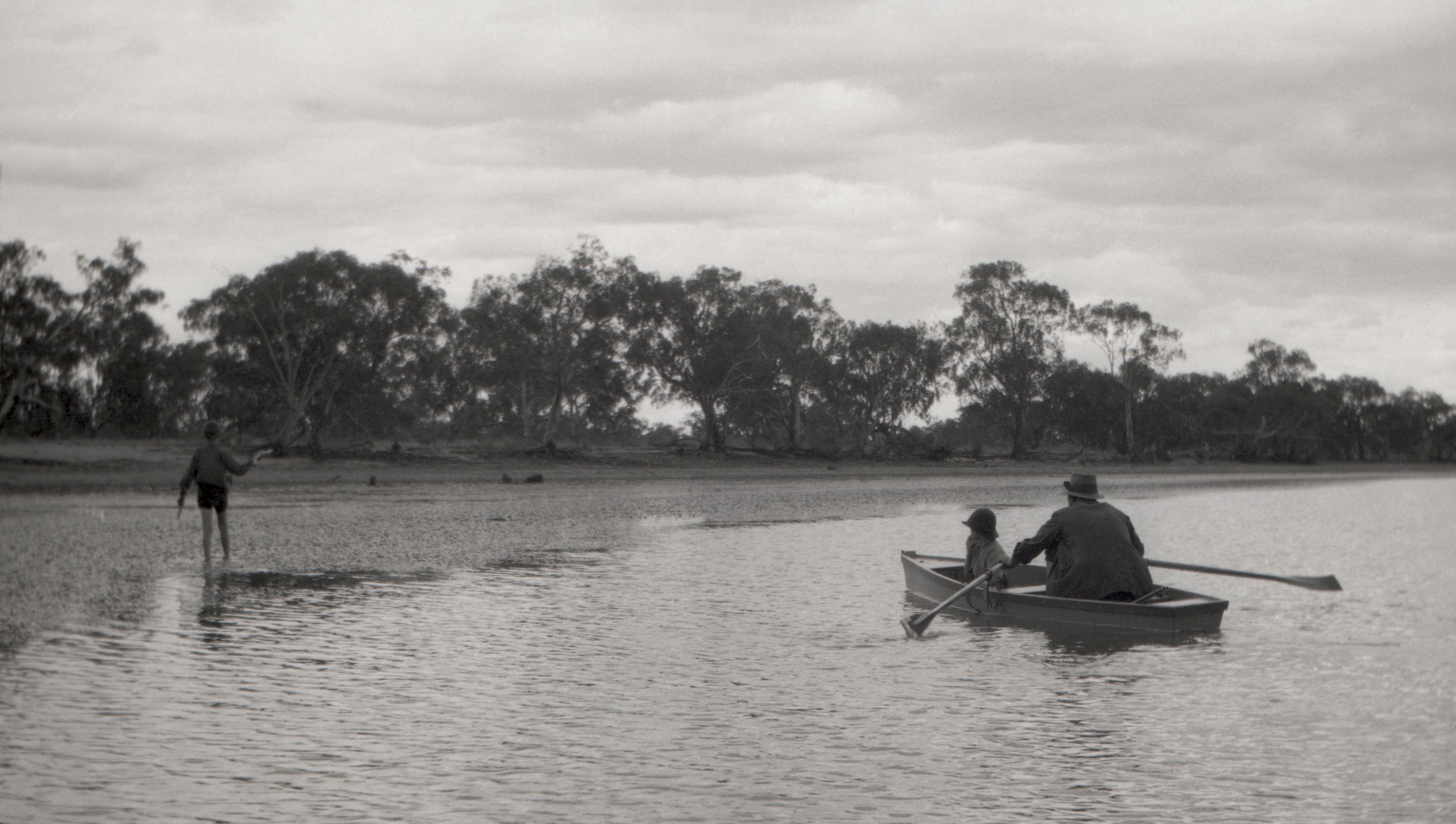
Fishing on Lake Waljeers

Waljeers is a Civil parish of Waljeers County in the Riverina area of Far West, New South Wales.

The parish is between Hay, New South Wales and Booligal in Balranald Shire located at 34°03′10″S 144°36′27″E. The name Waljeers is derived from a local Aboriginal word of the Muthi Muthi tribe. The main feature of the parish is Waljeers lake, and area is semi arid. The economy is based in broad acre agriculture.
