= Penarie, New South Wales =

Penarie
- Town
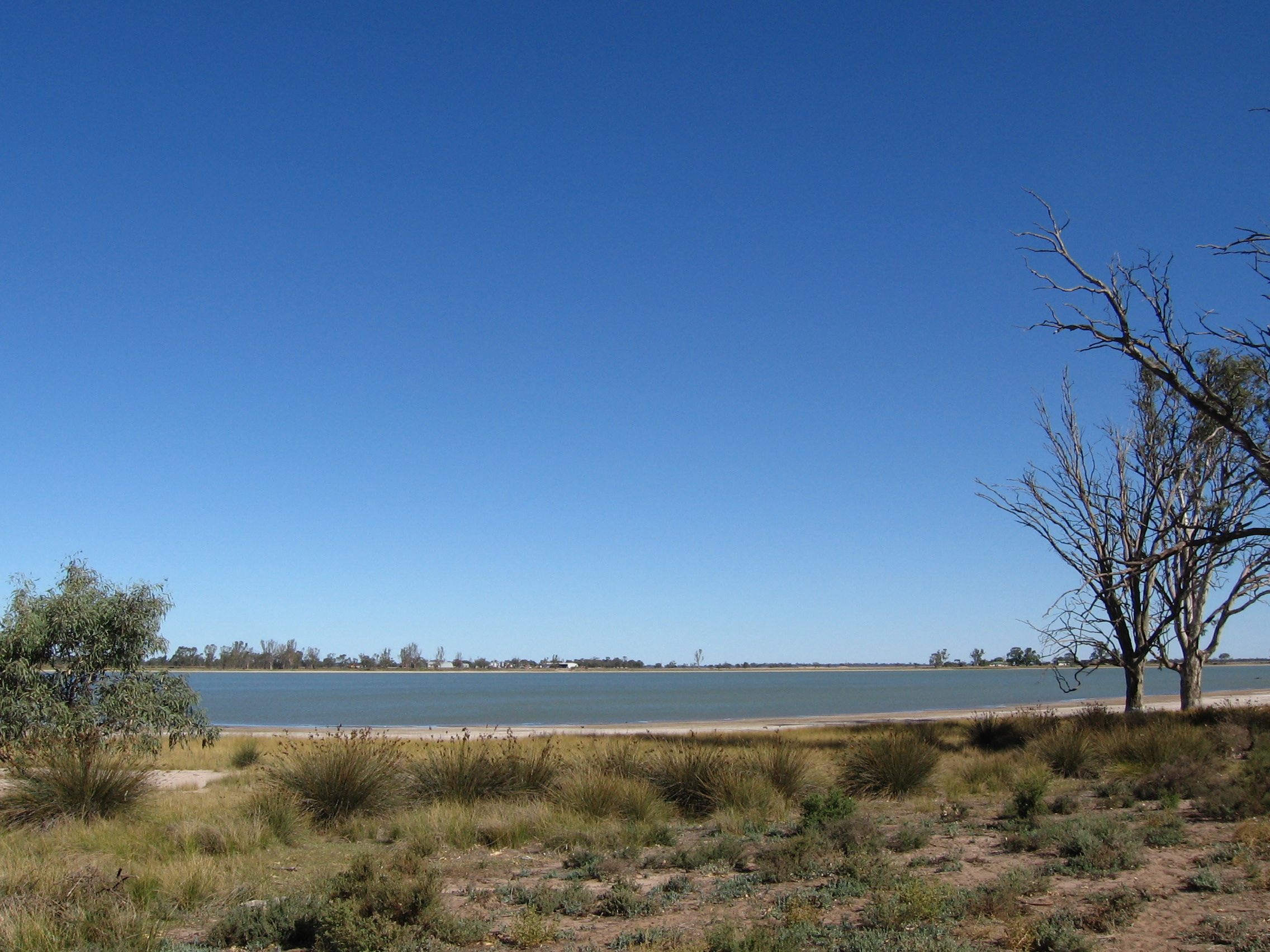

- Coordinates: 34°24′23″S 143°36′48″E
- Country: Australia
- State: New South Wales
- LGA: Balranald Shire
- Location: 881 km (547 mi) WSW of Sydney; 458 km (285 mi) NNW of Melbourne; 191 km (119 mi) E of Mildura; 28 km (17 mi) N of Balranald

Government
  - State electorate: Murray
  - Federal division: Farrer
- Postcode: 2715
- County: Caira

Penarie is a small settlement about 32 kilometres north of Balranald, in the Riverina district of New South Wales, Australia. It is part of Balranald Shire. Penarie is situated at a junction on the road between Balranald and Ivanhoe, where a branch road leads to Oxley. Penarie was formerly known as Homebush.

== History ==
Penarie is on the traditional lands of the Muthi Muthi Aboriginal tribe.

On 26 July 1877 Michael Dowdican made a conditional purchase of land at the Balranald-Ivanhoe-Oxley road junction and built the Homebush Hotel, which commenced operating in 1878.

Michael Dowdican held the licence of the Homebush Hotel until 1896. From 1897 until at least 1900 the publican was William H. S. Wilkinson.

William Henry Smith Wilkinson of the "Homebush" hotel near Balranald New South Wales, died 9 Nov 1905 (Probate Sydney to Louisa Wilkinson, widow).

Mrs. Catherine Prendergast, widow of Patrick Prendergast (a pioneer of Maude village), “conducted the Homebush Hotel for several years”.
