= Riverina Recorder =

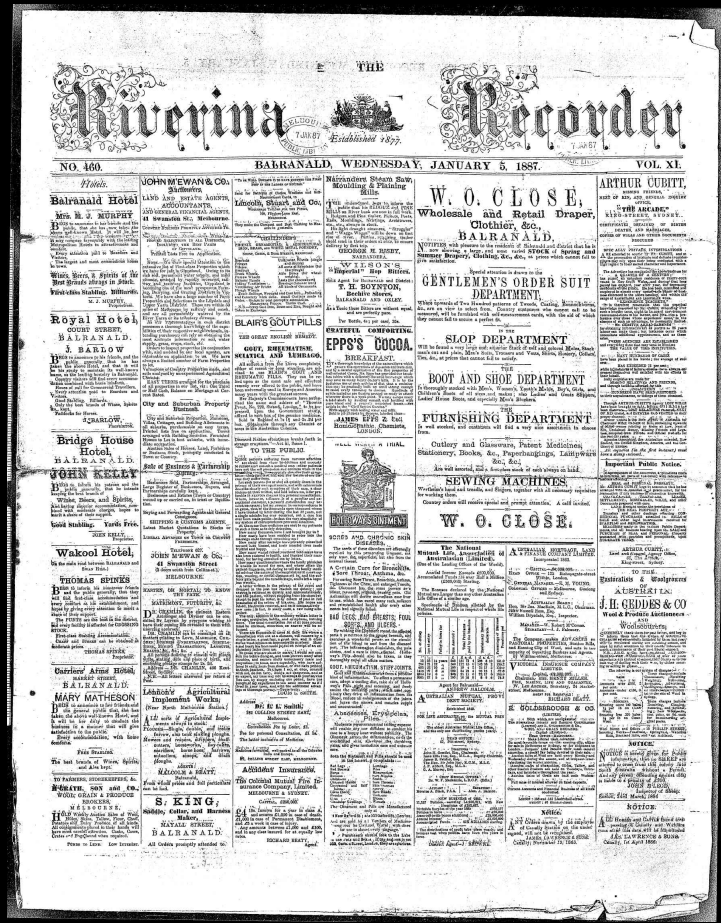
- Front page of the Riverina Recorder on 5 January 1887.
- Type: Weekly newspaper
- Launched: 1877
- Ceased publication: 1 April 1965
- City: Balranald, New South Wales
- Country: Australia
- ISSN: 2202-4468
- OCLC number: 221275806

The Riverina Recorder, also published as the Moulamein Times and the Riverina Record, Moulamein Times was a weekly newspaper published in Balranald, New South Wales, Australia from 1877 to 1965.

== History ==
The Riverina Recorder was first published in 1877 and was published weekly until 1 April 1965, when it ceased publication under this name. During this period it was also known as the Riverina recorder, Moulamein times and had been previously titled the Moulamein Times. It was distributed across Balrandald, Oxley, Euston, Moulamein and Swan Hill.

The paper was incorporated into the Swan Hill Guardian. This was renamed in 1971 to The Guardian, which is still in publication.

== Digitisation ==
The paper has been digitised as part of the Australian Newspapers Digitisation Program of the National Library of Australia.
