= Taila County =

Taila New South Wales
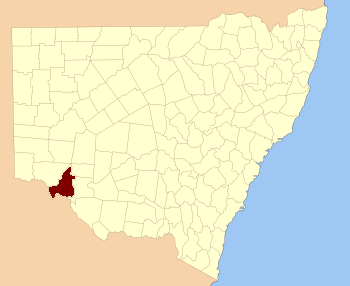
- Location in New South Wales
Lands administrative divisions around Taila:
Wentworth	Perry	Kilfera
Wentworth	Taila	Caira
Karkarooc (Vic)	Tatchera (Vic)	Caira

Taila County is one of the 141 cadastral divisions of New South Wales. It contains the town of Euston.

The name Taila is believed to be derived from a local Aboriginal word.

== Parishes within this county ==
A full list of parishes found within this county; their current LGA and mapping coordinates to the approximate centre of each location is as follows:

Parish	LGA	Coordinates
Benanee	Balranald Shire	34°30′43″S 142°54′10″E
Bengallow	Wentworth Shire	34°29′18″S 142°28′41″E
Bertram	Balranald Shire	34°34′27″S 142°36′40″E
Bidura West	Balranald Shire	34°08′51″S 143°10′03″E
Boorong	Wentworth Shire	34°20′01″S 142°34′31″E
Brooke	Balranald Shire	33°59′34″S 143°14′56″E
Bunchie	Wentworth Shire	33°54′18″S 142°53′46″E
Burkett	Balranald Shire	33°37′40″S 143°06′36″E
Caringy	Balranald Shire	34°23′14″S 142°55′50″E
Coolena	Balranald Shire	34°25′38″S 142°51′17″E
Euston	Balranald Shire	34°31′57″S 142°44′59″E
Garnet	Wentworth Shire	34°09′48″S 142°44′34″E
Grant	Balranald Shire	34°13′18″S 142°53′37″E
Gulthul	Balranald Shire	34°20′17″S 142°47′37″E
Ki	Balranald Shire	34°38′43″S 142°33′38″E
Koorakee	Balranald Shire	34°29′40″S 143°01′25″E
Laurie	Wentworth Shire	34°15′53″S 142°43′38″E
Lette	Balranald Shire	34°19′52″S 143°08′48″E
Lowan	Balranald Shire	34°02′36″S 143°14′10″E
Mallee Cliffs	Wentworth Shire	34°23′58″S 142°28′46″E
Manie	Balranald Shire	34°38′54″S 143°11′17″E
Maniette	Balranald Shire	34°37′22″S 143°04′00″E
Marma	Balranald Shire	34°03′01″S 142°48′10″E
Matalong	Wentworth Shire	34°32′39″S 142°29′47″E
Meilman	Balranald Shire	34°36′35″S 142°57′29″E
Mendook	Balranald Shire	34°27′32″S 142°46′01″E
Merowa	Balranald Shire	34°37′08″S 143°11′54″E
Mundonah	Balranald Shire	34°07′11″S 142°54′31″E
Mungo	Balranald Shire	33°51′08″S 143°05′56″E
Mylatchie	Balranald Shire	34°23′11″S 143°09′15″E
North Mundonah	Balranald Shire	34°01′06″S 142°55′57″E
Nowong	Balranald Shire	34°42′57″S 142°37′22″E
Ormond	Balranald Shire	34°06′47″S 143°03′16″E
Park	Balranald Shire	34°19′50″S 143°00′37″E
Prungle	Balranald Shire	34°10′54″S 143°03′37″E
Rainding	Balranald Shire	34°28′17″S 142°39′12″E
Spencer	Balranald Shire	33°58′35″S 143°03′39″E
Taila	Balranald Shire	34°33′20″S 142°51′43″E
Tittara	Balranald Shire	34°30′56″S 143°08′38″E
Werimble	Balranald Shire	34°24′45″S 143°03′53″E
Youngera	Balranald Shire	34°23′32″S 142°41′57″E
Zanci	Balranald Shire	33°45′41″S 143°06′47″E
