= Norma Male =

Australian local government administrator

Norma Male BEM (1916–2017) was an Australian local government administrator, the first woman to be appointed permanently to the senior role of Town Clerk in New South Wales.

== Early years ==
Norma Thora Male was born in 1916 in Hughenden, Queensland to Henry James Male and Louisa Ann Male. She had a sister Altha and two brothers Jim and Cliff.

== Career ==
Norma Male was employed at age of 18 as a stenographer for the Cootamundra Municipal Council. Male completed her town clerk exams in 1942 and 1943. She continued working for the Cootamundra Municipal Council until 1944.

Male was appointed Town Clerk of Balranald Municipality in 1944 and became the Shire Clerk of Balranald Shire in 1957, following its incorporation.

On 25 August 1944 Male was the first woman elected to the Local Government Clerks Association of N.S.W..

In 1947, she presided over the opening of the Balranald Library.

She was the Shire Clerk of Balranald from 1956 until she retired in 1974. Following her retirement Male moved from Balranald to Sydney where she worked part-time at the Town Clerks Society and Institute of Municipal Management from 1974 to 1988.

== Awards ==
- Male is featured in the National Pioneers Women's Hall of Fame as the first female Town Clerk and Shire Clerk in New South Wales and possibly in Australia.
- 1975 Male was awarded the Order of the British Empire in 1975 for dedicated service to Local Government.

== Personal life ==
Norma Male died on 2 October 2017 at West Wyalong aged 101 years.

== See also ==
- Balranald, New South Wales
