= Success (prison ship) =

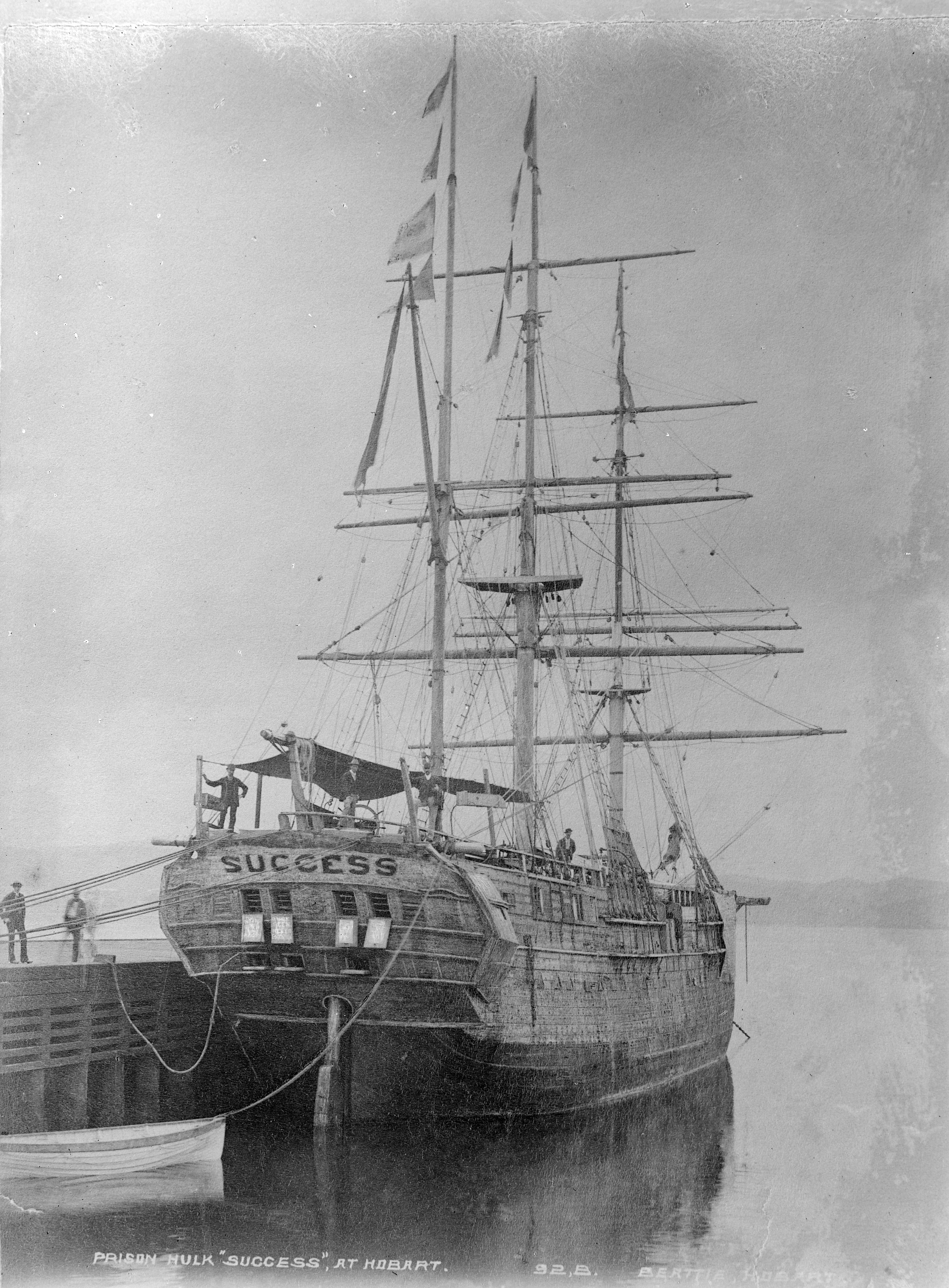
- The prison hulk, Success, at Hobart, Tasmania, Australia.

History
- Name: Success
- Completed: 1840
- Fate: Destroyed by fire in 1946

General characteristics
- Tons burthen: 621 (bm)
- Length: 117 ft 3 in (35.7 m)
- Beam: 26 ft 6 in (8.1 m)
- Draft: 22 ft 5 in (6.8 m)
- Installed power: Sail
- Sail plan: Full-rigged ship

Success was an Australian prison ship, built in 1840 at Nat Moo shipyard in Mawlamyine (then Moulmein), Burma, for Cockerell & Co. of Calcutta. Between the 1890s and the 1930s, she was converted into a floating museum displaying relics of the convict era and purporting to represent the horrors of penal transportation in Great Britain and the United States of America. After extensive world tours she was destroyed in 1946 by fire while berthed in Lake Erie near Cleveland, Ohio in the US.

== Origins ==
Success was originally a merchant ship of 621 tons, 117 feet 3 inches x 26 feet 8 inches x 22 feet 5 inches depth of hold, built in Natmoo, Tenasserim, Burma, in 1840. The London owners, Phillips, Shaw & Lowther, initially focused on trading around the Indian subcontinent before undertaking three voyages with emigrants from Devon to Australia during the 1840s. The first departed from Plymouth on 29 September 1847 with 245 emigrants, arriving in Adelaide on 29 January 1848. A second voyage was made to Melbourne in 1849, and following the intervention of Caroline Chisholm, Success sailed into Sydney town just the week before Christmas 1849 with families who had survived the Great Famine. The third arrived in Port Philip on 31 May 1852 at the height of the Victorian gold rush.

In 1852 alone, 293 ships arrived in Melbourne. Due to an increase in crime, prisons were overflowing and the Government of Victoria purchased large sailing ships to be employed as prison hulks. These included Success, Deborah, Sacramento and President. In 1854, the ship was converted from a convict hulk into a stores vessel and anchored on the Yarra River, where she remained for the next 36 years.

In 1857, prisoners from Success murdered the Superintendent of Prisons John Giles Price, the inspiration for the character Maurice Frere in Marcus Clarke's novel For the Term of His Natural Life.

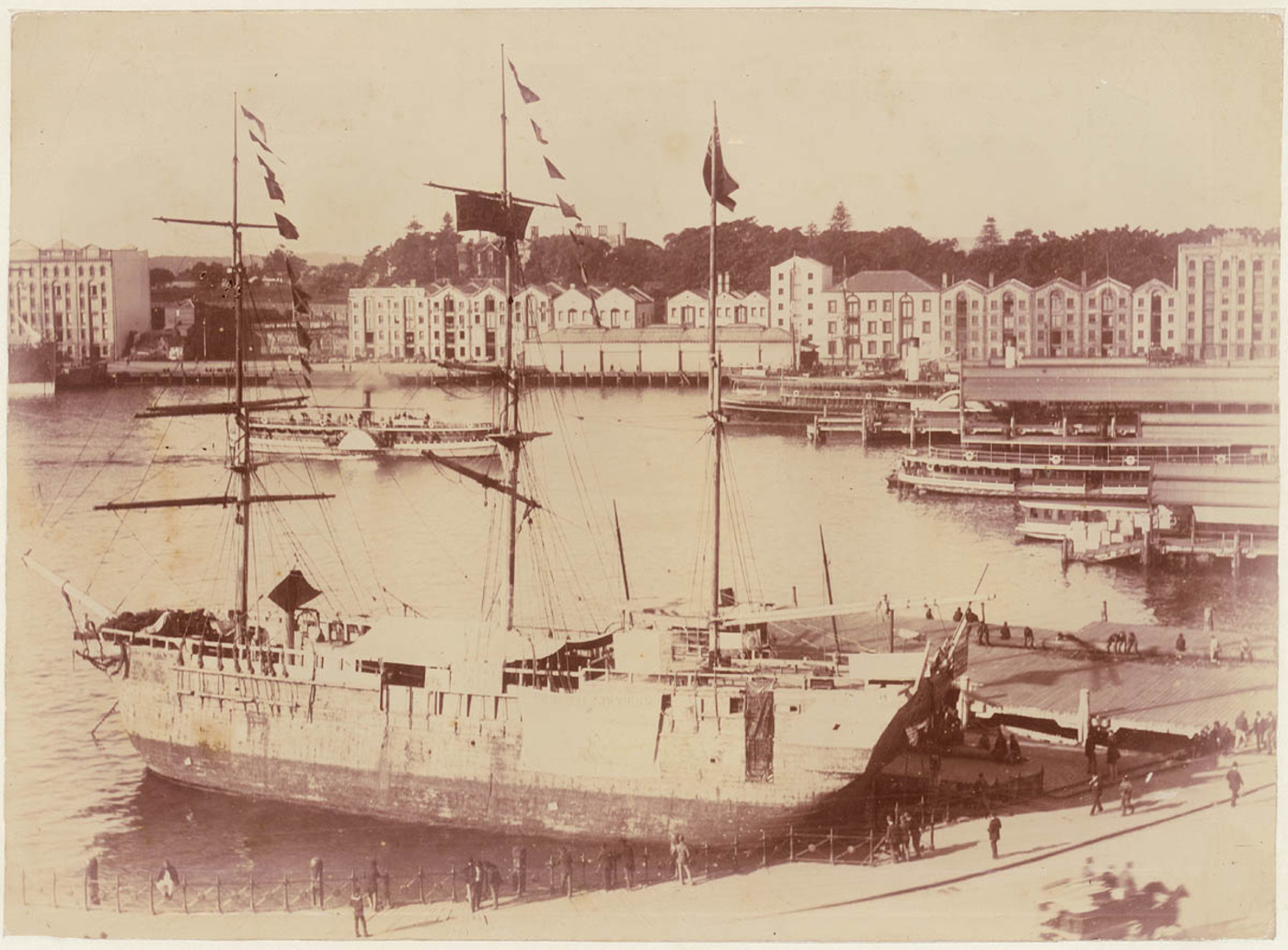
`Success'; fake convict ship at Circular Quay, Sydney, 1891

== Museum ship ==
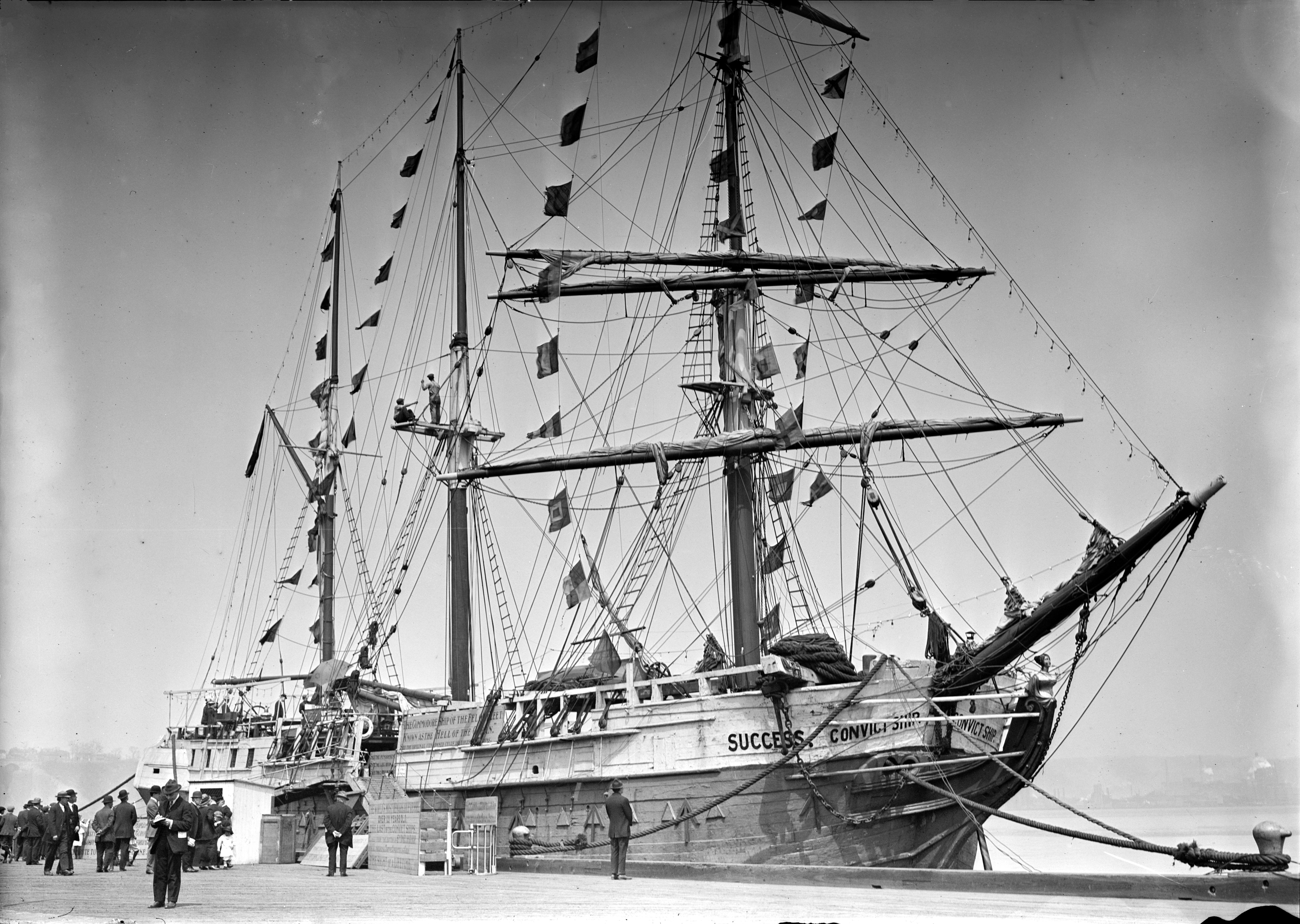
Success as a museum ship

In 1890, Success was purchased by a group of entrepreneurs to be refitted as a museum ship to travel the world advertising the perceived horrors of the convict era. Although never a convict ship, Success was billed as one, her earlier history being amalgamated with those other ships of the same name including Success, which had been used in the original European settlement of Western Australia. She was incorrectly promoted as the oldest ship afloat, ahead of the 1797 USS Constitution.

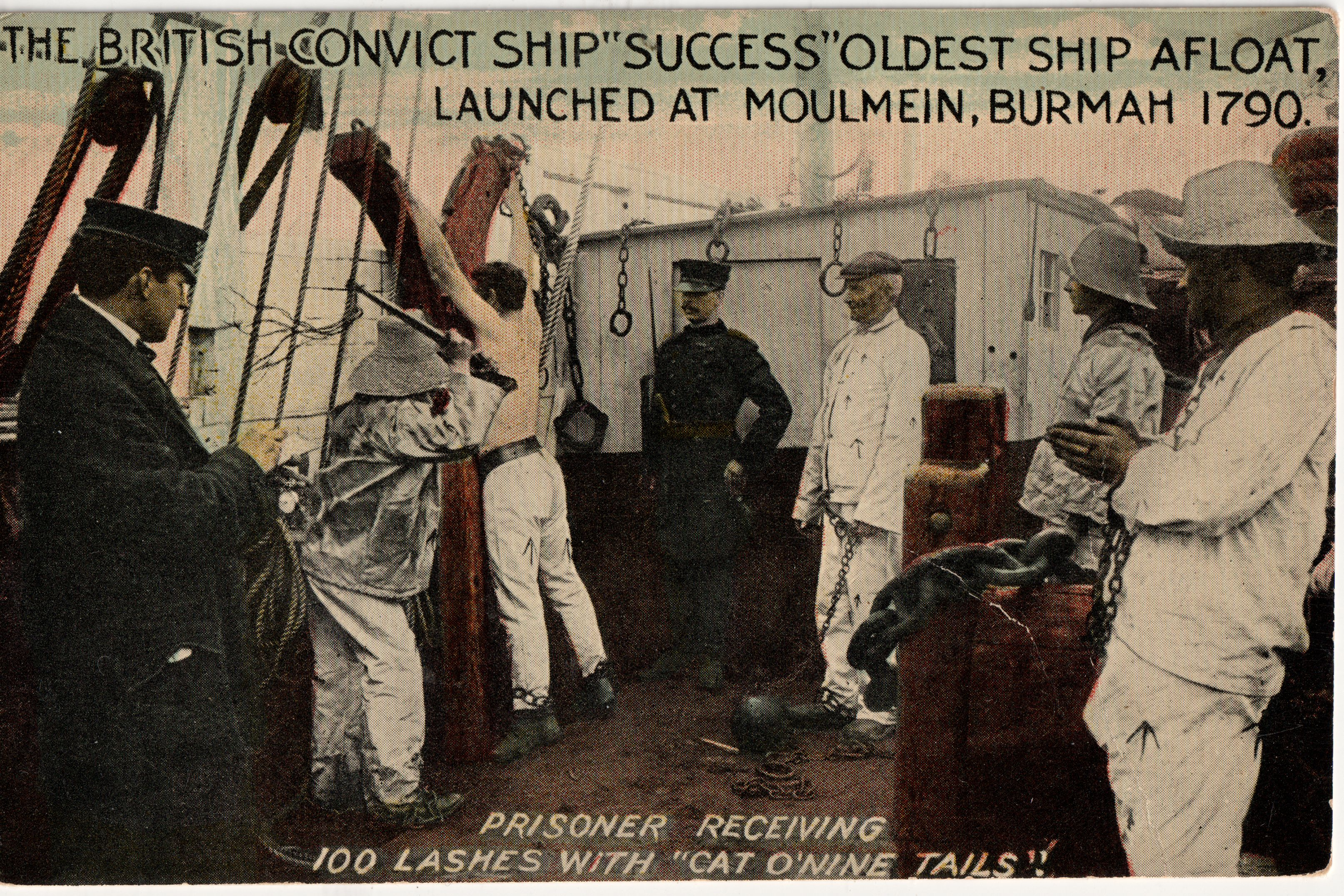
Prisoner shown being whipped aboard this ship in an early 20th century postcard

A former prisoner, bushranger Harry Power, was employed as a guide for her first commercial season in Sydney Harbour in 1891. The display was not a commercial success, and her owners promptly abandoned their business venture and scuttled the ship in Kerosene Bay.

The following year the sunken Success was sold to a second group of entrepreneurs and refloated. After a thorough refit she was taken on tour to Brisbane, Adelaide, Hobart, and back to Sydney, then headed for England, arriving at Dungeness on 12 September 1894.

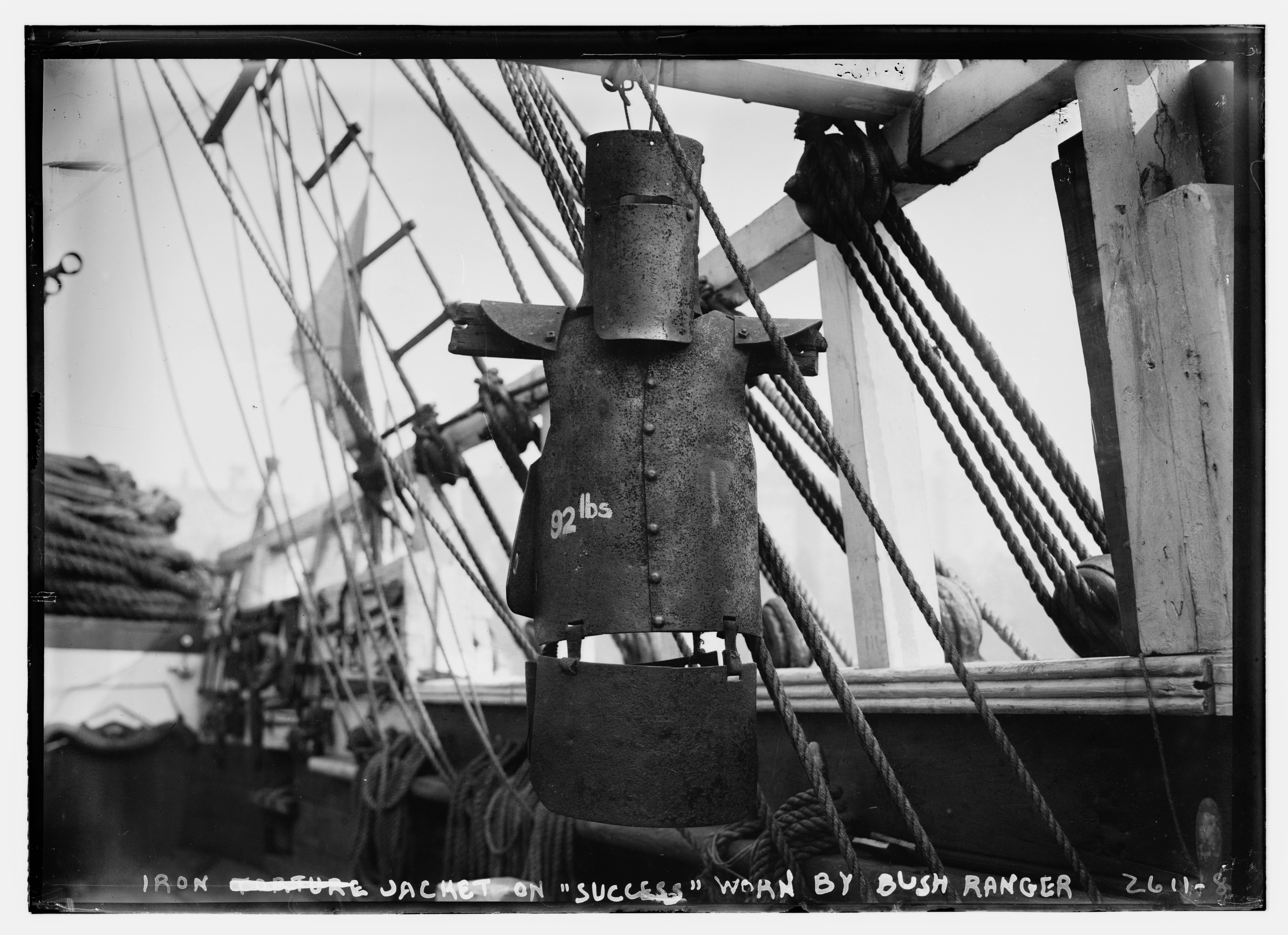
Iron jacket on SUCCESS, photographed during US exhibition, 1912 or 1913

In 1912 she crossed the Atlantic and was exhibited as a convict museum along the eastern seaboard of the United States of America and later in ports on the Great Lakes. On April 22, 1915 the ship was docked in San Francisco CA for the Panama–Pacific International Exposition. While there a short film made by the Keystone Film Company called “Mabel and Fatty Viewing the World's Fair at San Francisco.” This film can be found in the Library of Congress collection. In this film the two stars go on board and the mayor of San Francisco James “Sunny Jim” Rolph, Jr. gives an extended tour of the ship. In 1917 she was briefly returned to commercial service as a cargo carrier. She sank after being holed by ice in January or February, 1918. She is listed as sunk by ice at Carrollton, Kentucky in January–February, 1918, in the March, 1918 issue of The American Marine Engineer magazine, Wrecksite lists 4 January 1919, at Wheeling, West Virginia. Refloated in 1918 she resumed her museum ship role. In 1933 was featured at the Chicago World Fair.

However, despite ongoing repairs Success was becoming rapidly unseaworthy. She was towed to Sandusky, Ohio, on Lake Erie, Ohio, to be dismantled and sold as scrap. A strong storm sank her at her moorings at Sandusky. A salvage operator named Walter Kolbe acquired the rights to her and in the summer of 1945 he had Success towed to nearby Port Clinton. Unable to enter the shallow port, she grounded just east of Port Clinton. On 4 July 1946 a fire broke out aboard Success, and in the course of the afternoon she burned to the waterline. Hundreds watched the blaze from the shoreline. The fire is generally attributed to unknown vandals. Remains of the ship remain in 16 feet of water just east of Port Clinton harbor.

The South Australian Maritime Museum holds a 1:60 full-hull model of Success.
