= Balranald =

- Town
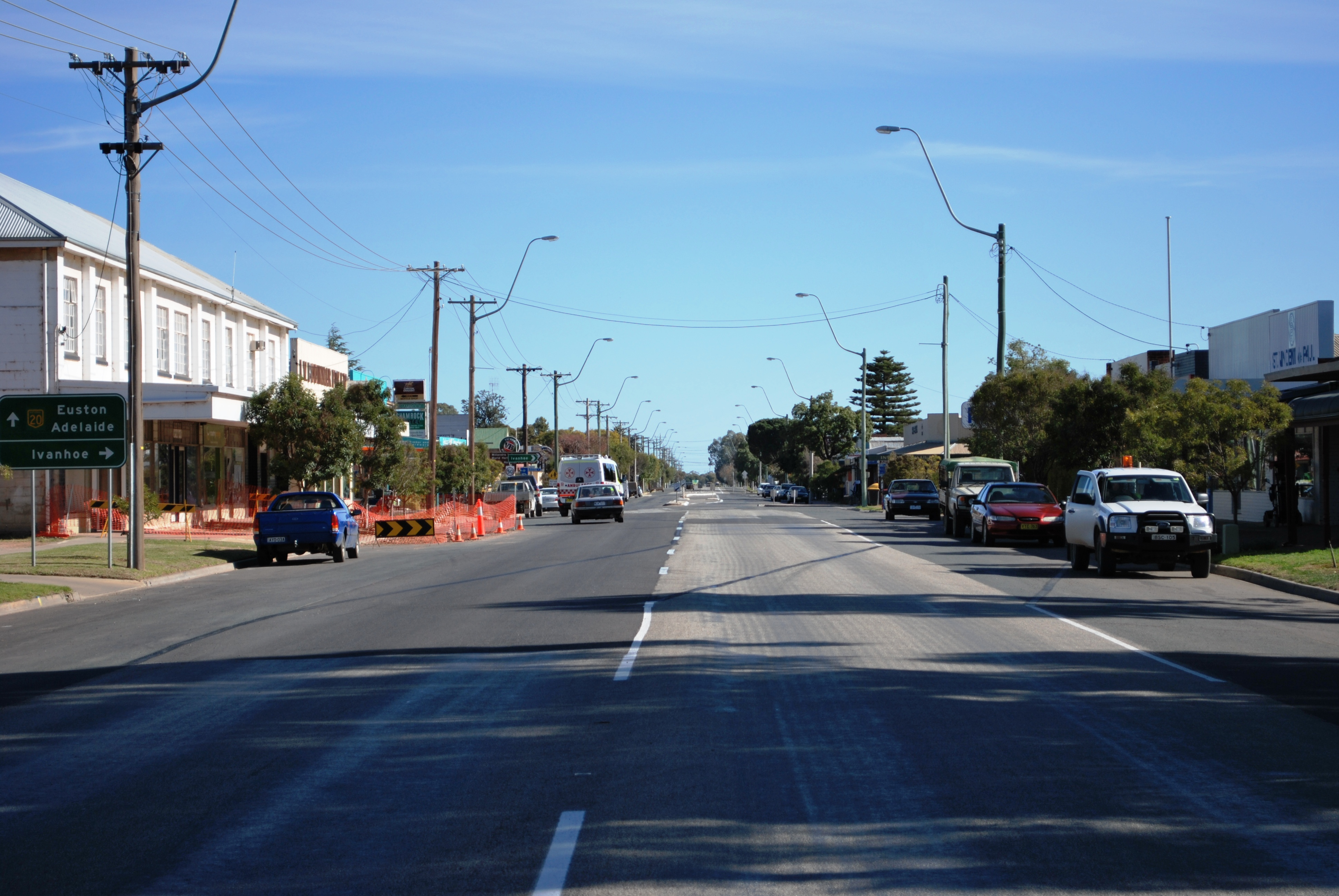
- The Sturt Highway at Balranald

- Coordinates: 34°37′0″S 143°34′0″E
- Country: Australia
- State: New South Wales
- LGA: Balranald Shire
- Location: 854 km (531 mi) WSW of Sydney; 80 km (50 mi) ESE of Euston; 163 km (101 mi) ESE of Mildura
- Established: 1851

Government
  - State electorate: Murray
  - Federal division: Farrer
- Elevation: 61 m (200 ft)

Population
  - Total: 1,063 (2021 census)
- Postcode: 2715
- County: Caira
- Mean max temp: 24.3 °C (75.7 °F)
- Mean min temp: 10.0 °C (50.0 °F)
- Annual rainfall: 324.1 mm (12.76 in)

Balranald /bælˈrænəld/ is a town within the local government area of Balranald Shire, in the Murray region of far south-western New South Wales, Australia.

The town of Balranald is located where the Sturt Highway crosses the Murrumbidgee River in a remote, semi-desert area. Although it is part of New South Wales, Balranald receives Victorian television stations, with a range of Sydney and Melbourne newspapers available. Balranald was featured heavily in 2010–2015 Australian tourism ads, displaying the natural flora of the region with over 30 subspecies of shrubs native to Balranald and its surrounds.

== History ==
Balranald is located in Mutthi Mutthi traditional country. The area has a long history before non-indigenous settlement and a strong indigenous culture continues to this day.

=== Township beginnings ===
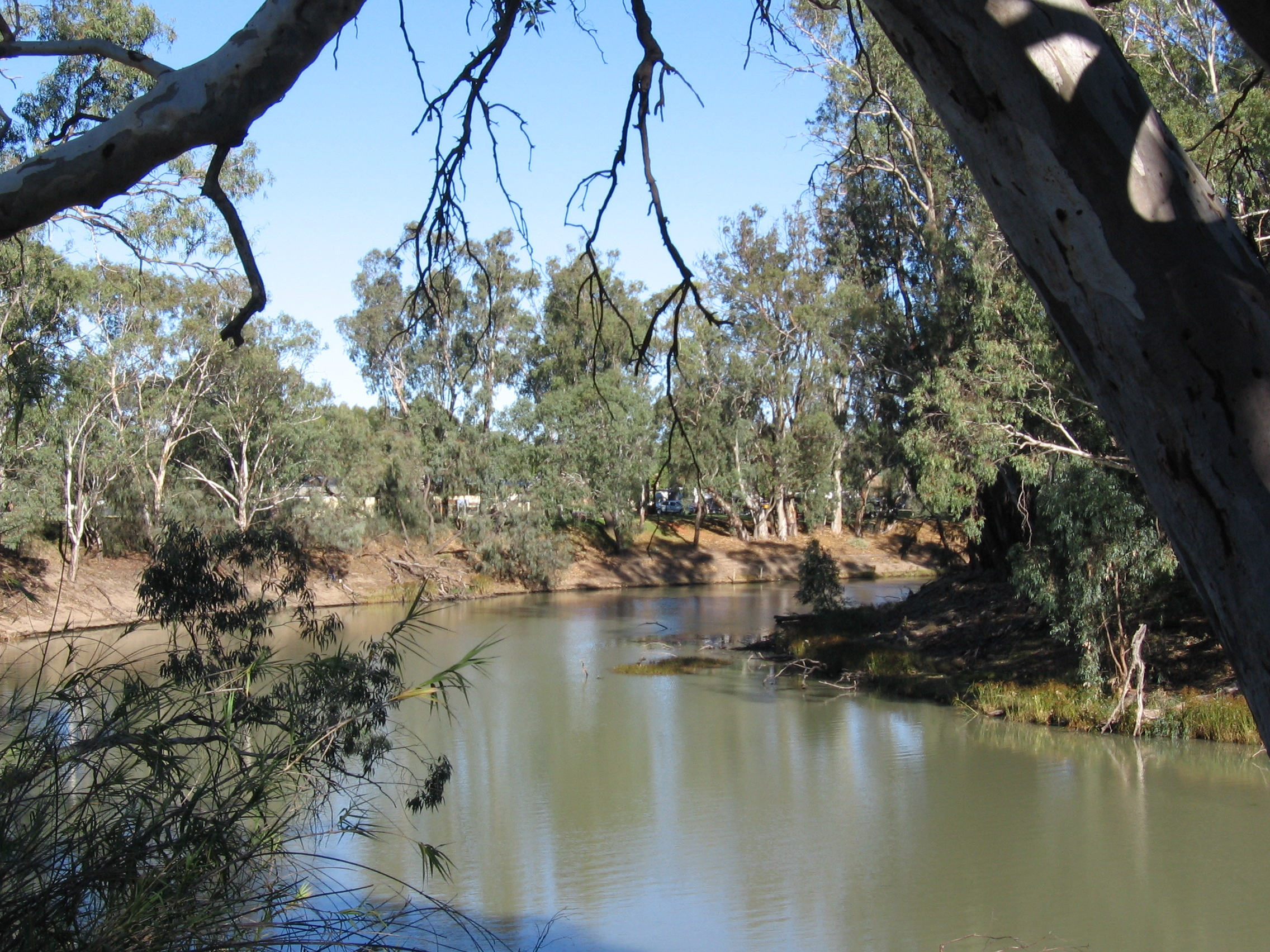
The former site of the wharves on the Murrumbidgee River

In 1848 George James MacDonald, the Commissioner for Crown Lands for the Lower Darling District, arrived at the site of the present-day township with a police escort. Commissioner MacDonald had chosen the site as his base, and he and his entourage set up their camp under canvas. In 1848 Leighton Robinson and Thomas Duggan established a general store at Balranald and during the same year a public-house, the Balranald Inn, was erected by a Mr Robertson.

In 1849 the Crown Lands Commissioner MacDonald recommended to the Colonial Secretary that a township be established at the location. MacDonald was a Scotsman, born at Balranald on North Uist in the Outer Hebrides; he chose the name of his birthplace for the new settlement. He pointed out that the township's position, on the lower reaches of the Murrumbidgee River, was expected to be of strategic importance with the impending introduction of steam navigation on the Murray.

During 1849 the surveyor Francis MacCabe laid out large reserves in the region of the Lower Murrumbidgee / Murray-Darling junction. Included in MacCabe's surveys was a site "for a Township at the North End of Caiera, otherwise Balranald Reserve". The decision to lay out Balranald township was made in November 1849. Commissioner MacDonald died in 1851 and he was succeeded by Stephen Cole. Cole used Balranald as a base until 1853, when the office of Commissioner for Crown Lands for the Lower Darling District was transferred to Euston where a new house was erected for the Commissioner.

The township of Balranald was gazetted on 4 April 1851 and the first land sale held on 14 January 1852, with thirty-five lots submitted to public auction. On 1 March 1852 an official post office opened in the township. (An earlier post office had opened in the area on 1 January 1850 but closed and was replaced by an unofficial service). From 1853 the mail contractor, John Bent, operated a service along the Murrumbidgee River between Wagga Wagga and Balranald.

A second hotel, the Carriers' Arms, was erected at Balranald in about 1852 by the German, Philipp Comitti (but records show he didn't arrive in Australia until Mar 1854). William Graham acquired the licence of the Balranald Inn in April 1854. Graham held the licence until 1859 when he was murdered. The perpetrator was arrested and later hanged at Goulburn jail. Denis Hanan then obtained the licence of the Balranald Inn, which he held until 1867. In 1859 Hanan purchased a punt from Captain Cadell and operated it at the southern end of Mayall Street.

The Victorian gold-rushes, which began as Balranald was being established, had a profound impact on the Riverina region by stimulating the development of the fat-stock market. The development of the stock-route across the One-tree Plain to Lang's Crossing-place tended to direct attention away from Balranald to the region up-river of the Murrumbidgee-Lachlan junction. By the latter half of the 1850s, when the fat-stock market was at its peak, Balranald was exhibiting signs of stagnation. A correspondent from the area made these comments about the township in August 1858: "This obscure and miserable township, situated on the Lower Murrumbidgee, is here attracting a considerable share of attention, as being one of those rowdy places for which the Australian bush in the interior has become so famous".

=== Burke and Wills ===
The Burke and Wills expedition crossed the Murrumbidgee River at Balranald on their journey to cross Australia from Melbourne to the Gulf of Carpentaria. The camels and two of the wagons crossed on the Mayall Street punt on Saturday, 15 September 1860, and the remaining waggons were brought over the next day. Camp XX was set up on the outskirts of Balranald (their twentieth camp since leaving Melbourne).

To lighten the loads on the wagons in preparation for crossing the mallee country between the Murrumbidgee and the Darling, Burke left 15 1/2 long cwt (790 kg) of sugar, some rice, all eight demi-johns of lime juice, four bags of camel's sugar, the anvil, bellows, some iron, the blacksmith's vice, a handsaw, five axes, two rifles, several revolvers and the camel litter at Messrs Sparkes, Cramsie & Co.'s store. He then took on hay and maize for the animals and flour for the men, for which he paid very high prices. Three of the men were dismissed at Balranald and returned to Melbourne, where one of the men, Charles Ferguson, successfully sued the Royal Society of Victoria for wrongful dismissal.

On Monday, 17 September 1860 the expedition departed northwards for Paika Station.

=== Developments to 1900 ===
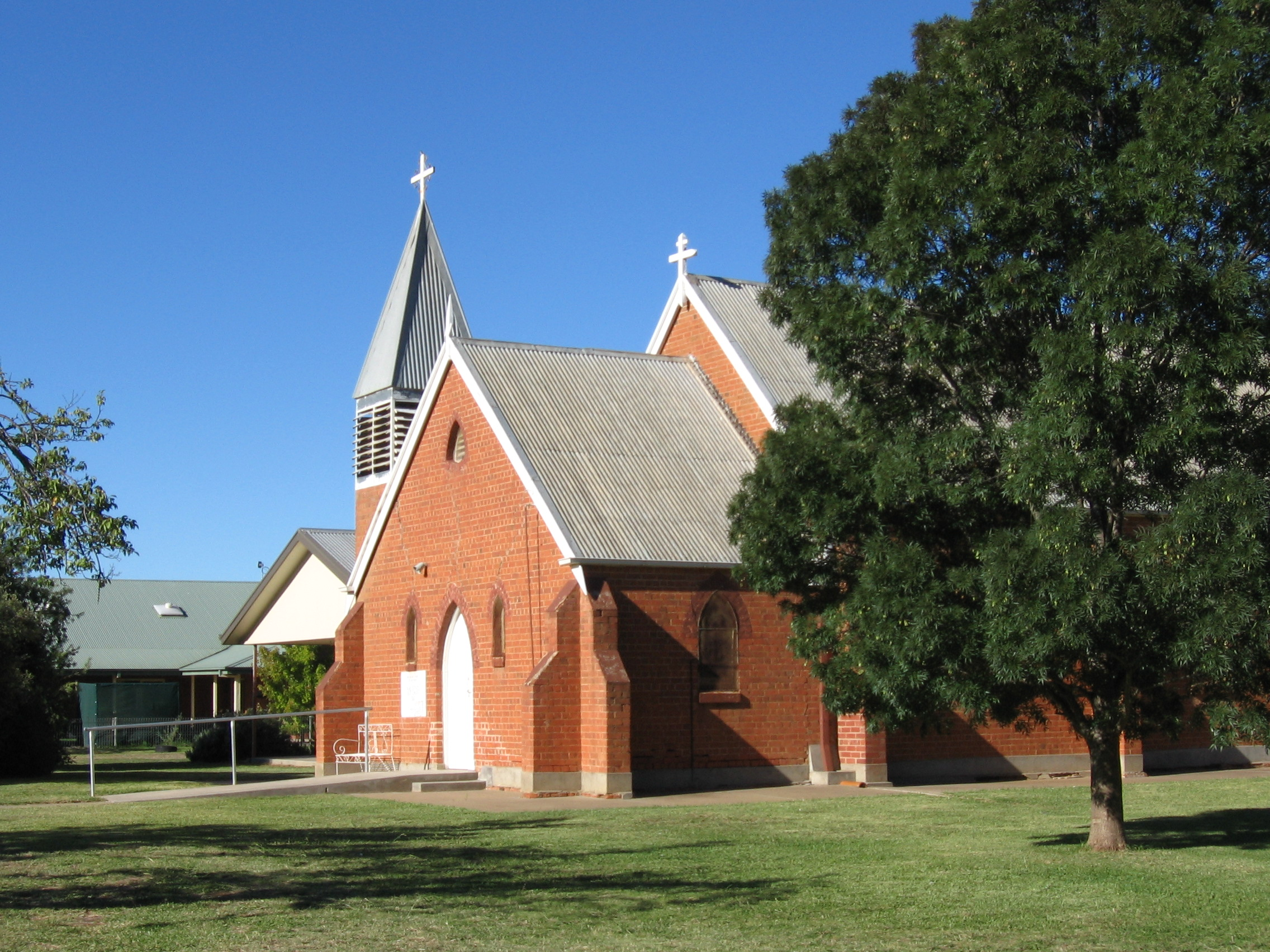
St Barnabas Anglican Church

Balranald became a major crossing place for stock from South Australia. In 1866 Peter Young built the Royal Hotel at Balranald and began operating a second punt at the township. A toll-house was later erected on the north bank of the river near Young's punt. William Hall purchased the Balranald Inn and the Mayall Street punt from Denis Hanan in 1867. The Commercial Hotel was erected in 1869 and the first licensee was John Russell. In 1871 a new Post & Telegraph Office was erected at Balranald, the first brick building to be built in the township.

The first church to be built at Balranald was of the Church of England denomination; services began on 6 April 1873 by the incumbent minister Rev. W. H. Yarrington. Two months later the church was consecrated by the Bishop Mesac Thomas of the Diocese of Goulburn (of which Balranald was a part). A Roman Catholic church was completed in 1875. A newspaper, the Riverina Recorder, was commenced in 1877.

In 1881 the population of Balranald was about 400 and it was reported that the town supported five stores and six hotels. Balranald was proclaimed a Municipality in 1882 and Herman Levy was elected its first mayor. The first meetings of the Municipal Council were held in the old Court house at the corner of Market and River streets. A lift-span bridge was constructed over the Murrumbidgee River at Balranald, which opened in April 1883. In 1885 a new Court House was erected in the town. In 1887 Balranald was described as "a squarely built little town with few prominent buildings'. By that stage it had two churches and a Gospel Hall, a hospital, a branch of the Australian Joint Stock Bank, and a Masonic Hall. By 1888 a Presbyterian church had been built there.

=== 1901 to the present ===
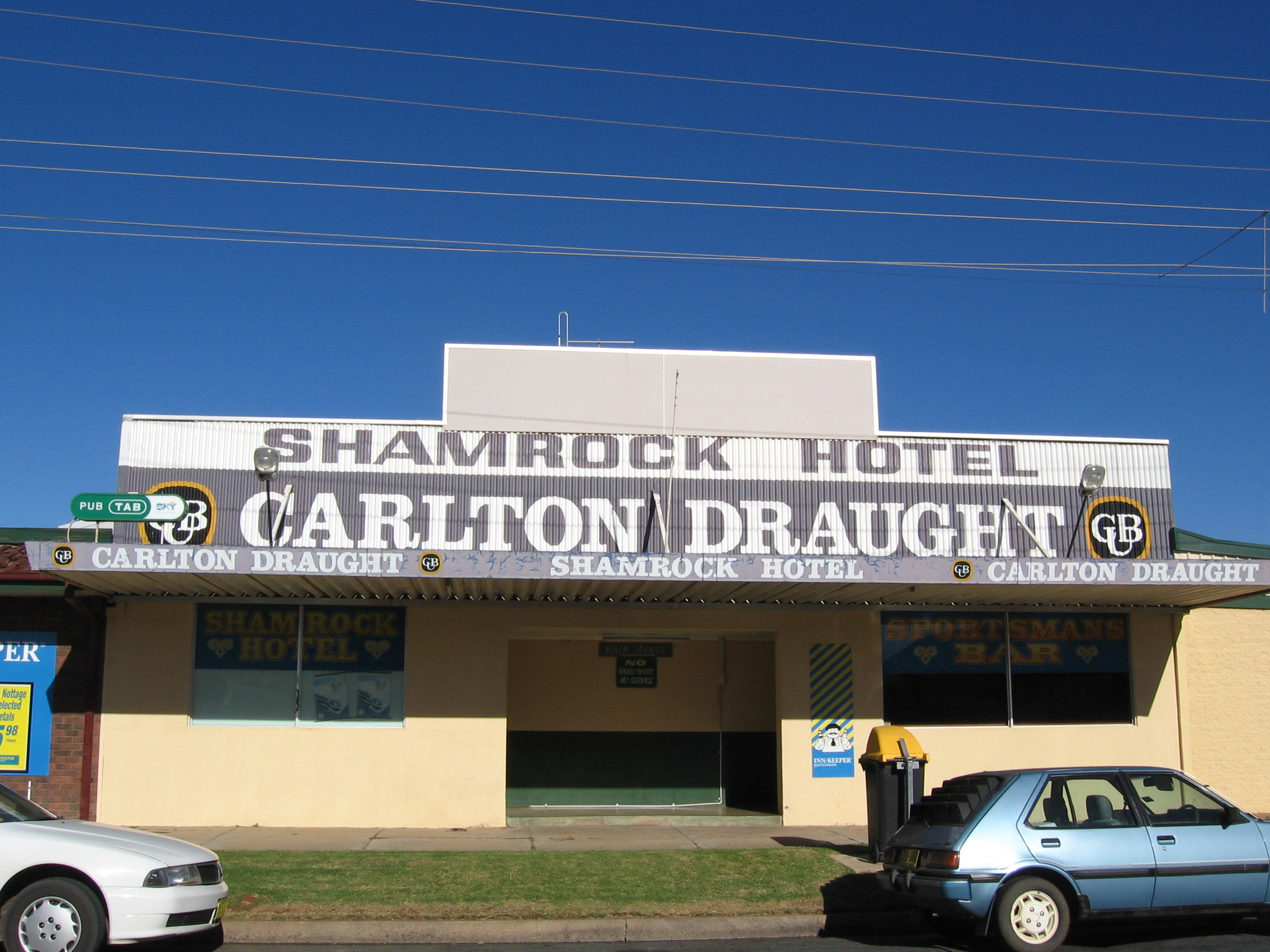
The Shamrock Hotel

The first public telephone service in Balranald was installed in 1911. The Balranald Municipal Council underwent financial difficulties, and in 1912 the Government of New South Wales appointed a receiver to take charge of affairs. The difficulties seem to have been overcome by the following year.

In March 1926 Balranald was connected to the Victorian Railways system via the Balranald railway line to Echuca. The line closed in 1986.

In 1944 Norma Male was appointed Town Clerk at the Balranald Municipal Council, the first female town clerk in New South Wales.

In 1956 the local government administrative body became the Shire of Balranald, with Shire presidents replacing Mayoral positions.

New premises for the Balranald Shire Council were opened in August 1964. They were erected at a cost of £40,000 and are located in Market Street beside the police station.

On 8 June 1973, a 143 metre long concrete bridge that carries the Sturt Highway over the Murrumbidgee River replaced the 1882 built vertical lift bridge.

==== Solar power ====
Two large solar farms are south of Balranald. Both commenced construction in 2018. The Limondale Solar Farm developed by Innogy, rated at 349 Megawatts, was Australia's largest solar generation facility when it opened in 2020, about 16 km (9.9 mi) south of the town. The Sunraysia Solar Farm, rated at 255 Megawatts (DC), is about 18 km (11 mi) south of the town, built by the Australian-Chinese company Maoneng Group. Both feed into the existing power grid at the same nearby TransGrid substation. A diesel-solar-battery hybrid power system is being built for the $480 million Balranald rutile mine.

== Climate ==
Balranald has a cold semi-arid climate (BSk) with hot summers, cool winters and low rainfall throughout the year, typical of the far south-west. The winter has more rainy days than the rest of the year and can be rather cloudy at times.

Rainfall records have been kept for Balranald since 1879, while those of temperature since 1907. Temperature extremes are quite marked over the full year: summers are regularly over 40 °C (104 °F) while winters can see daytime temperatures below 10 °C (50 °F). The highest temperature recorded at Balranald was 48.4 °C (119.1 °F) on 27 January 2026, while the lowest recorded was −4.8 °C (23.4 °F) on 21 July 1982. The average annual rainfall is 324.1 millimetres (12.8 in).

Being very far west in the state, Balranald is susceptible to cold fronts off the Great Australian Bight, even at the height of summer. On 3 February 2005 a maximum of 12.5 °C (54.5 °F) was recorded, being exceptionally cold for its very low elevation of 61 metres (200 ft) and latitude of 34.6 degrees south.

Climate data for Balranald (RSL, 1907–2026, rainfall to 1879); 61 m AMSL; 34.64° S, 143.56° E
Month	Jan	Feb	Mar	Apr	May	Jun	Jul	Aug	Sep	Oct	Nov	Dec	Year
Record high °C (°F)	48.4 (119.1)	46.2 (115.2)	42.2 (108.0)	39.0 (102.2)	35.6 (96.1)	25.6 (78.1)	27.0 (80.6)	30.1 (86.2)	37.6 (99.7)	40.8 (105.4)	44.6 (112.3)	46.2 (115.2)	48.4 (119.1)
Mean daily maximum °C (°F)	33.1 (91.6)	32.5 (90.5)	29.2 (84.6)	24.0 (75.2)	19.4 (66.9)	16.1 (61.0)	15.7 (60.3)	17.5 (63.5)	21.0 (69.8)	24.6 (76.3)	28.1 (82.6)	30.9 (87.6)	24.3 (75.8)
Mean daily minimum °C (°F)	16.5 (61.7)	16.4 (61.5)	13.7 (56.7)	9.6 (49.3)	6.8 (44.2)	4.4 (39.9)	3.6 (38.5)	4.8 (40.6)	7.2 (45.0)	9.9 (49.8)	12.7 (54.9)	14.9 (58.8)	10.0 (50.1)
Record low °C (°F)	7.5 (45.5)	7.2 (45.0)	4.4 (39.9)	0.8 (33.4)	−3.0 (26.6)	−3.3 (26.1)	−4.8 (23.4)	−2.7 (27.1)	−2.2 (28.0)	−1.1 (30.0)	3.5 (38.3)	5.5 (41.9)	−4.8 (23.4)
Average rainfall mm (inches)	22.8 (0.90)	24.2 (0.95)	21.8 (0.86)	24.3 (0.96)	31.1 (1.22)	29.2 (1.15)	26.2 (1.03)	29.2 (1.15)	29.1 (1.15)	31.5 (1.24)	29.0 (1.14)	25.5 (1.00)	323.8 (12.75)
Average rainy days (≥ 0.2 mm)	3.1	2.9	3.5	4.1	6.2	7.4	8.2	8.0	6.6	5.9	4.7	3.9	64.5
Average afternoon relative humidity (%)	30	32	35	41	52	59	57	49	43	38	34	31	42

== Agriculture ==
Agricultural activities in the Balranald district include sheep farming, woodcutting, charcoal production and some areas of irrigated crop-growing along the rivers.

== Attractions ==
Balranald Shire is the location of Yanga National Park and World Heritage listed Mungo National Park.

== Australia's first telephone ==
The first telephone to be used in Australia was installed at nearby "Yanga" station, to allow communications between the homestead and the shearers' quarters. The installation was carried out by James Cromyn under directions forwarded from England by his uncle Alexander Graham Bell, an early developer of the telephone.

The Balranald telephone exchange was converted from manual to automatic operation in 1988 to 1990. The manual exchange number prior to automation phone number was (050) 4841 to reach the exchange, then the numbers (050) 201–000 to 201–999 were allocated for Balranald subscribers. Following the ACA renumbering in the late 1990s, the numbers are now in the (03) 5020–1000 to (03) 5020–1999 range.

There are two amateur radio repeaters installed near the town on the 2-metre and 70 cm. bands.

== Community ==
The town has an Australian rules football team competing in the Central Murray Football League.

Golfers play at the Balranald Golf and Sporting Club on O'Connor Street.

== Population ==
Historical population
Year	Pop.	±%
1921	874	—
1933	1,261	+44.3%
1947	1,249	−1.0%
1954	1,273	+1.9%
1961	1,331	+4.6%
1966	1,490	+11.9%
1971	1,424	−4.4%
1976	1,396	−2.0%
1981	1,442	+3.3%
1986	1,398	−3.1%
1991	1,327	−5.1%
1996	1,419	+6.9%
2001	1,284	−9.5%
2006	1,216	−5.3%
2011	1,159	−4.7%
2016	1,159	+0.0%
2021	1,063	−8.3%
Source: Australian Bureau of Statistics data.

According to the 2021 census, there were 1,063 people in Balranald.

- Aboriginal and Torres Strait Islander people made up 9.6% of the population.
- 78.2% of people were born in Australia and 79.4% of people only spoke English at home.
- The most common responses for religion were Catholic 29.6%, Anglican 13.5% and No Religion 26.0%.
