= Campbell, Waljeers =

Parish in New South Wales, Australia

Campbell Parish is a civil parish of Waljeers County in New South Wales, Australia, between Ivanhoe and Booligal on the Hay Plain. The parish is on the Lauchlin River at 33°29'14.0"S 144°30'18.0"E.

The area is semi arid and the main economy is broad acre agriculture.

The parish is in Carrathool Shire.
