= Sunraysia Solar Farm =

- Country: Australia
- Location: South of Balranald, New South Wales
- Coordinates: 34.81°S 143.49°E
- Status: Operational
- Construction began: January 2019
- Commission date: February 2022
- Owner: Maoneng Group

Solar farm
- Type: Flat-panel PV
- Total collector area: 10 square kilometres (3.9 sq mi)
- Site area: 1,000 hectares (2,500 acres)

Power generation
- Nameplate capacity: 200 MW (255 MW DC)

External links
- Website: www.sunraysiasolarfarm.com.au

The Sunraysia Solar Farm is a solar farm south of Balranald in south western New South Wales, Australia. It was expected to be complete around the end of 2019, but was commissioned in 2022.

The Sunraysia Solar Farm is owned by Maoneng Australia and was designed and built by Decmil. Construction started in early 2019.

Fifty percent of the output of the Sunraysia Solar Farm energy will supply AGL Energy, and twenty-five percent will be supplied to the University of New South Wales. The rest will be sold into the National Electricity Market. It is part of AGL's plan to replace the output of its coal-fired Liddell Power Station which was closed in 2022-23.

Immediately north of the Sunraysia Solar Farm, the Limondale Solar Farm has been commissioned. Both solar farms will connect to the same 220kV TransGrid substation.

== See also ==
- List of solar power stations in New South Wales
- Renewable energy in Australia
