= Goona Warra, Waljeers =

Civil parish in New South Wales

Coordinates: 34°03′10″S 144°36′27″E

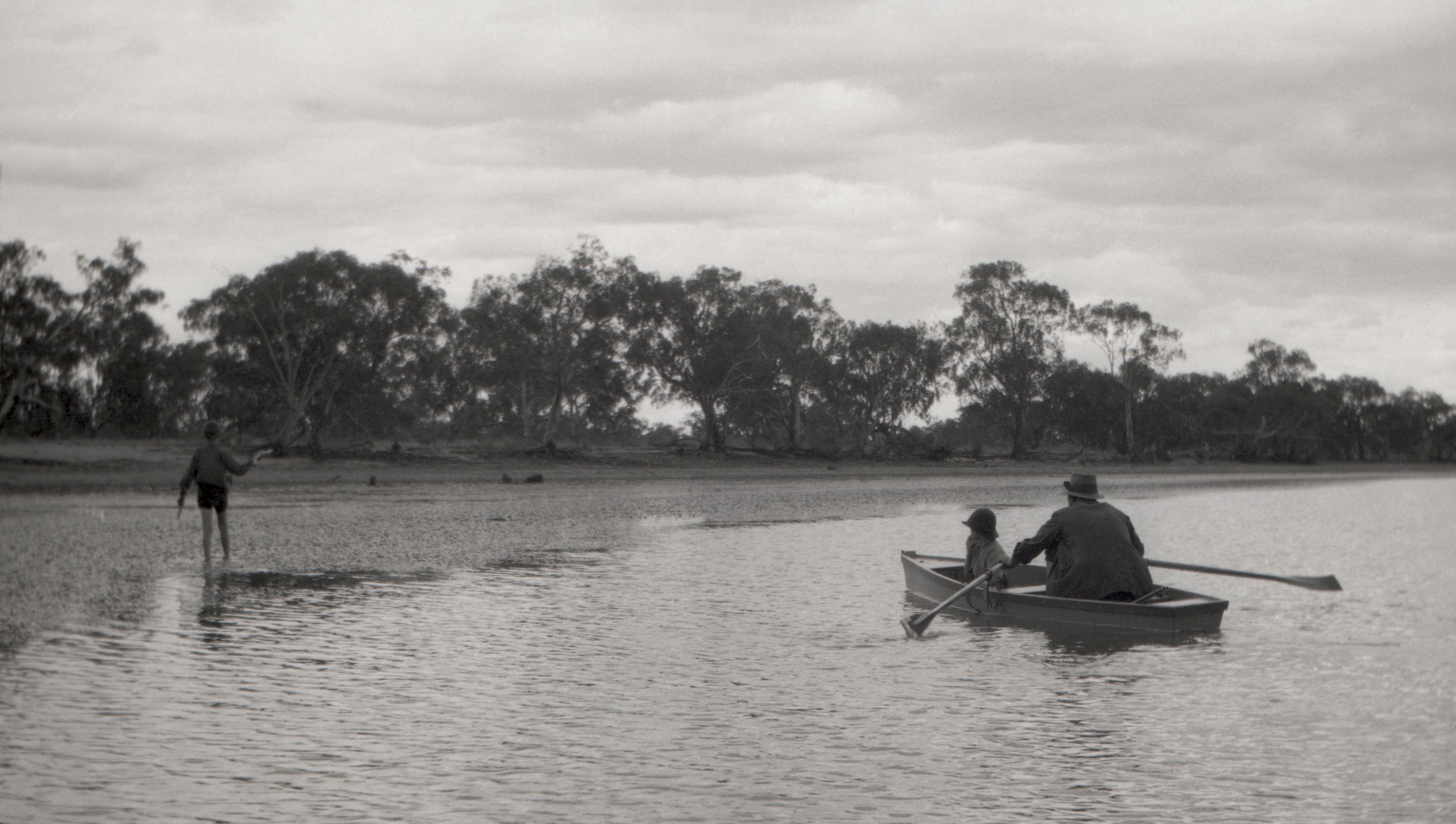
Fishing on Lake Waljeers

Goona Warra is a civil parish of Waljeers County in the Riverina area Far West, New South Wales, Australia.

The parish is situated between Hay, New South Wales and Booligal within Hay Shire.The main feature of the parish is Lake Waljeers, and the Lachlan River. The area is semi arid and the main economy is broad acre agriculture, producing crops as wheat, barley, canola, as well as irrigated cotton and rice, which are crucial for supporting local farming communities.
