= Kilfera County =

Land administration area in New South Wales, Australia

Kilfera New South Wales
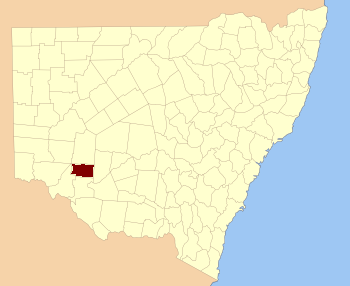
- Location in New South Wales
Lands administrative divisions around Kilfera:
Perry	Manara	Waljeers
Wentworth	Kilfera	Waljeers
Taila	Caira	Waljeers

Kilfera County is one of the 141 cadastral divisions of New South Wales. Hatfield is located there.

Kilfera County was named after the nearby Kilfera Station.

== Parishes within this county ==
A full list of parishes found within this county; their current LGA and mapping coordinates to the approximate centre of each location is as follows:

Parish	LGA	Coordinates
Bidura	Balranald Shire	
Bomarthong	Balranald Shire	33°46′03″S 144°03′43″E
Chnowa	Balranald Shire	33°52′34″S 143°42′48″E
Culpaterong	Balranald Shire	33°48′25″S 143°52′57″E
Juanbung	Balranald Shire	33°58′59″S 143°44′04″E
Magenta	Balranald Shire	33°47′52″S 143°29′50″E
Sahara East	Balranald Shire	34°04′39″S 144°01′17″E
Sahara	Balranald Shire	33°57′34″S 143°52′12″E
Solferino	Balranald Shire	33°47′51″S 143°17′47″E
Tankie	Balranald Shire	33°37′24″S 143°19′58″E
Willilbah East	Balranald Shire	33°57′28″S 143°34′06″E
Willilbah	Balranald Shire	
Woolpagerie	Balranald Shire	33°42′46″S 143°32′32″E
Yelkeer North	Balranald Shire	33°44′46″S 143°53′33″E
Yhoul	Balranald Shire	
