= Limondale Solar Farm =

- Country: Australia
- Location: Balranald, New South Wales
- Coordinates: 34.79°S 143.50°E
- Status: Commissioned
- Construction began: October 2018
- Commission date: 2021; 5 years ago
- Owner: RWE
- Operator: Belectric (subsidiary of Innogy)

Solar farm
- Type: Flat-panel PV
- Collectors: 872,000
- Site area: 900 ha (2,200 acres)

Power generation
- Nameplate capacity: 313MW AC (349MW DC)

External links
- Website: iam.innogy.com/en/about-innogy/innogy-innovation-technology/renewables/solar-energy/limondale-solar-plant

Limondale Solar Farm is a solar farm south of Balranald in southwestern New South Wales, Australia. When it was completed, it was the largest solar farm in Australia. It is owned by German company RWE through a subsidiary Belectric Solar and Battery, and was constructed by Australian engineering company Downer Group.

The Limondale site was identified and the initial proposal was developed by Overland Sun Farming. The site is adjacent to a Transgrid 220kV substation, shared with Sunraysia. The development received planning consent from the New South Wales government on 1 September 2017. Innogy was initially brought in as a financial partner, but then it acquired ownership in September 2018, prior to construction. Construction began in October 2018, and was completed in 2020.

Immediately south of the Limondale solar farm, the Sunraysia Solar Farm was commissioned in 2022.

A 50 MW / 400 MWh (8-hour) grid battery started operating in 2026.

== See also ==
- List of solar power stations in New South Wales
- Renewable energy in Australia
