= Woombah Parish (Caira County), New South Wales =

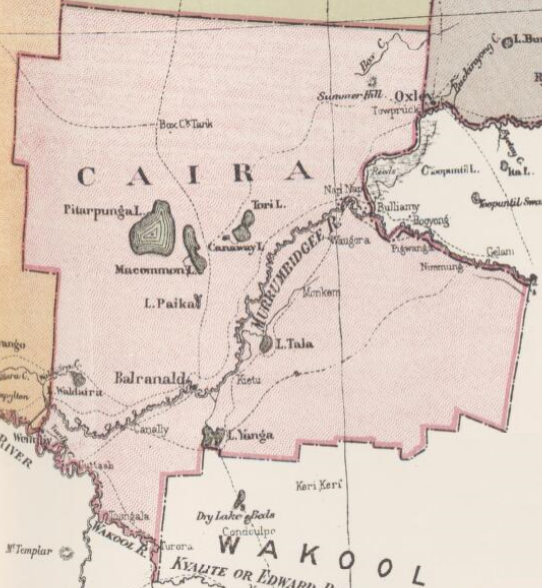
Caira County NSW (John Sands 1886 map)

Woombah is a civil Parish of Caira County New South Wales and a rural locality of Murray River Council.
