= Euston, New South Wales =

Euston
- Town
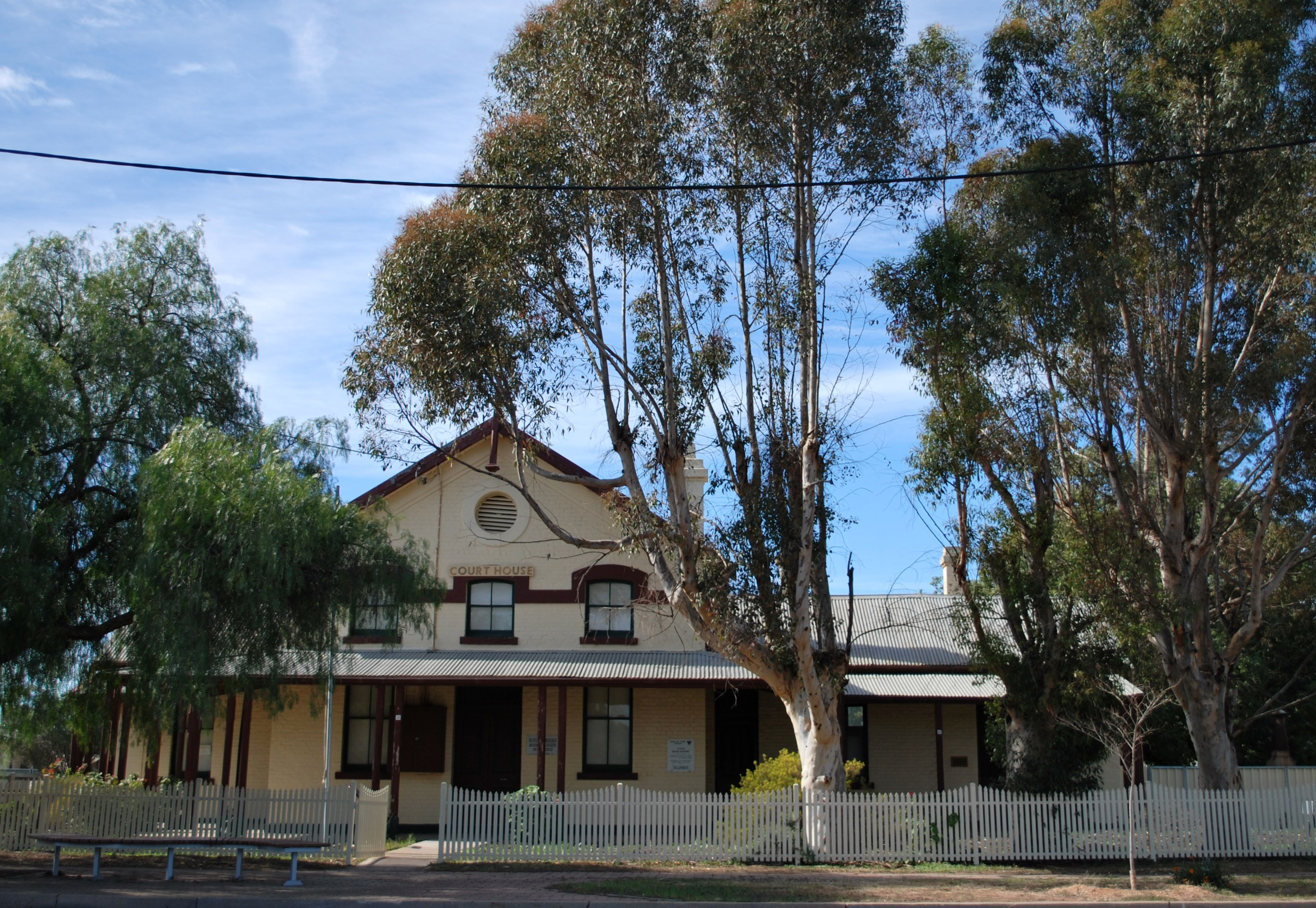
- Courthouse at Euston

- Coordinates: 34°34′S 142°44′E
- Country: Australia
- State: New South Wales
- LGA: Balranald Shire

Government
  - State electorate: Murray
  - Federal division: Farrer
- Elevation: 61 m (200 ft)

Population
  - Total: 822 (2021 census)
- Postcode: 2737
- County: Taila
- Mean max temp: 24.0 °C (75.2 °F)
- Mean min temp: 9.5 °C (49.1 °F)
- Annual rainfall: 311.2 mm (12.25 in)

Euston is a small town on the banks of the Murray River, in far south-western New South Wales, Australia. It is in the Balranald Shire. The twin town of Robinvale is on the other side of the river, in the state of Victoria.

At the 2021 census, Euston had a population of 822 people. Until the irrigation development at Robinvale, Euston was the main town in the area. A post office opened on 1 May 1852, closed in 1853, then reopened in 1856.

== History ==
For tens of thousands of years before European colonisation, a number of Aboriginal clans inhabited the area around Euston, principally the Kureinji people. There are many remnants of Aboriginal occupation and use of the land, including scar trees, fire hearths, flaked stone artefacts, burial sites and middens.

In 1830, the exploring party led by Charles Sturt became the first Europeans to traverse the general country. In 1876, the settlement at Euston was described in the following terms:

Euston is a crossing-place for sheep and cattle. There is a Custom-house officer here, though I should judge that his avocations were not of an extremely onerous nature, and the township also possesses a post and telegraph office. If the building can be taken as a type of the township, Euston has not a long life before it. The walls appear as if rent apart by an earthquake. The hotels and about a dozen small houses constitute the remainder of the township.

Euston and Robinvale are home to a large Italian population from the southern province of Calabria in Italy.

Euston has the Euston Sports and Recreation Club and the Euston Pub. The town used to field an Australian rules football team, which competed in the Millewa Football League, but they were forced to merge with Robinvale due to lack of players.

Euston is a gateway to the Murray River and Sunraysia district, known for its fishing, including the Murray cod and other native species, but now threatened by the European carp.

== Climate ==
Euston has a cold semi-arid climate (Köppen BSk), slightly cooler than Mildura due to its southern latitude. Although largely uniform, rainfall peaks somewhat in the cooler months of the year. Rainfall records are found as early as 1877, while those of temperature from 1907 with both terminating at 1970. Extreme temperature records were only kept for maxima, and in these records a reading of 48.7 °C (119.7 °F) was registered on 13 January 1939.

Climate data for Euston Post Office (1907−1970, rainfall to 1877); 61 m AMSL; 34.58° S, 142.73° E
Month	Jan	Feb	Mar	Apr	May	Jun	Jul	Aug	Sep	Oct	Nov	Dec	Year
Mean daily maximum °C (°F)	32.5 (90.5)	32.1 (89.8)	28.9 (84.0)	23.5 (74.3)	19.0 (66.2)	15.4 (59.7)	15.2 (59.4)	17.3 (63.1)	20.8 (69.4)	24.3 (75.7)	27.9 (82.2)	31.0 (87.8)	24.0 (75.2)
Mean daily minimum °C (°F)	15.8 (60.4)	15.7 (60.3)	13.0 (55.4)	8.9 (48.0)	6.1 (43.0)	3.9 (39.0)	3.1 (37.6)	4.1 (39.4)	6.8 (44.2)	9.5 (49.1)	12.3 (54.1)	14.6 (58.3)	9.5 (49.1)
Average rainfall mm (inches)	19.7 (0.78)	22.2 (0.87)	21.5 (0.85)	22.2 (0.87)	29.9 (1.18)	34.0 (1.34)	25.8 (1.02)	29.9 (1.18)	29.3 (1.15)	30.5 (1.20)	24.4 (0.96)	21.8 (0.86)	311.2 (12.25)
Average rainy days (≥ 0.2 mm)	2.6	2.7	3.2	4.0	5.9	7.7	7.6	8.1	6.7	5.8	4.1	3.2	61.6
