= Balranald Shire =

- Local government area
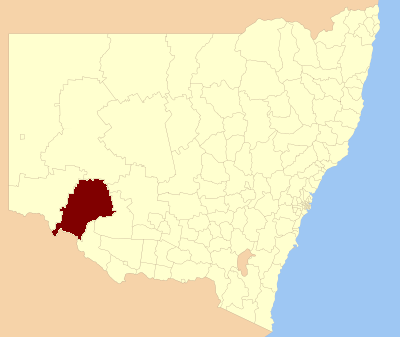
- location in New South Wales

- Interactive map of Balranald Shire
- Coordinates: 34°37′S 143°34′E
- Country: Australia
- State: New South Wales
- Region: Riverina
- Council seat: Balranald

Government
  - Mayor: Louie Zaffina
  - State electorate: Murray
  - Federal division: Farrer

Area
  - Total: 21,693 km^{2} (8,376 sq mi)

Population
  - Total: 2,208 (2021 census)
  - Density: 0.101784/km^{2} (0.26362/sq mi)
- Website: Balranald Shire
LGAs around Balranald Shire
Wentworth	Central Darling	Carrathool
Wentworth	Balranald Shire	Hay
Mildura (Vic)	Swan Hill (Vic)	Murray River

Balranald Shire is a local government area in the Riverina region of western New South Wales, Australia on the Sturt Highway. It is the location of World Heritage listed Mungo National Park. It includes the towns of Balranald and Euston. Other localities in the Shire include Kyalite, Hatfield, Penarie, Clare and Oxley.

As of 29 January 2020, the Balranald Shire Council Mayor and elected members were dismissed by NSW local government minister Shelley Hancock, after the recommendations of the report of commissioner Roslyn McCulloch. Mike Colreavy has been appointed the administrator until local council elections in 2024.

Following the NSW State Government Local Government elections in September 2024, a new Council and Mayor were appointed for Balranald Shire Council.

== Demographics ==
Selected historical census data for Balranald Shire local government area
Census year		2011	2016	2021
Population	Estimated residents on census night	2,283	▲2,287	▼2,208
Population	LGA rank in terms of size within New South Wales	127th	▲126th	126th
Population	% of New South Wales population	0.03%	0.03%	0.03%
Population	% of Australian population	0.01%	0.01%	0.01%
Cultural and language diversity				
Ancestry, top responses	Australian	32.3%	▼31.6%	▲35.3%
Ancestry, top responses	English	24.9%	▲25.1%	▲32.7%
Ancestry, top responses	Italian	10.3%	▼9.0%	▲12.0%
Ancestry, top responses	Irish	8.9%	▲10.1%	▼9.7%
Ancestry, top responses	Scottish	5.7%	▲5.9%	▲8.2%
Language, top responses (other than English)	Italian	4.4%	▼3.0%	▼2.2%
Language, top responses (other than English)	Fijian	n/c	▲0.6%	▲1.0%
Language, top responses (other than English)	Mandarin	0.3%	▲0.5%	▲1.7%
Language, top responses (other than English)	Tongan	0.6%	▼0.4%	▲0.7%
Language, top responses (other than English)	Vietnamese	n/c	n/c	▲0.6%
Religious affiliation				
Religious affiliation, top responses	Catholic	39.3%	▼35.7%	▼30.2%
Religious affiliation, top responses	No religion	13.6%	▲20.8%	▲28.8%
Religious affiliation, top responses	Not stated	n/c	▲12.7%	▲14.7%
Religious affiliation, top responses	Anglican	16.5%	▼15.0%	▼10.8%
Religious affiliation, top responses	Presbyterian and Reformed	8.6%	▲6.9%	▼4.6%
Median weekly incomes				
Personal income	Median weekly personal income	A$470	A$624	A$734
Personal income	% of Australian median income	81.5%	▲94.3%	▼91.2%
Family income	Median weekly family income	A$1126	A$1438	A$1781
Family income	% of Australian median income	76.0%	▲82.9%	▲84.0%
Household income	Median weekly household income	A$894	A$1174	A$1370
Household income	% of Australian median income	72.4%	▲81.6%	▼78.5%

== Council ==
=== Current composition and election method ===
The Balranald Shire Council is currently under administration, as of 29 January 2020, after local government minister Shelley Hancock accepted the recommendations of the report created by commissioner Roslyn McCulloch. The next election will be held in September 2024.

== Election results ==
=== 2024 ===
2024 Balranald Shire Council election: Results summary
Party	Votes	%	Swing	Seats	Change
Independents	1,034	100.0		8	
Formal votes	1,034	97.9			
Informal votes	22	2.1			
Total	1,056	100.0		8	
Registered voters / turnout	1,377	76.7			

=== 2012 ===
2012 New South Wales local elections: Balranald
Party	Candidate	Votes	%	±%
Independent	Stephen O'Halloran (elected)	419	35.8	−2.6
Independent	Leigh Byron (elected)	176	15.0	+3.3
Independent	Trevor Jolliffe (elected)	129	11.0	+11.0
Independent Labor	Alan Purtill (elected)	93	7.9	+0.2
Independent	Lynda Cooke (elected)	83	7.1	+7.1
Independent	Jeff Mannix (elected)	76	6.5	+3.0
Independent	Ken Barnes (elected)	80	6.8	+2.2
Independent	Elaine Campbell (elected)	50	4.3	+4.3
Independent	John Jackson	27	2.3	+2.3
Independent	Tina Powis	26	2.2	−3.1
Independent	Bill Vaarzon-Morel	12	1.0	+1.0
Turnout			79.6	
Party total votes
Independent		1,078	92.1	
Independent Labor		93	7.9	

== Localities ==
Town	Population
Balranald	1,343
Clare	
Condoulpe	
Euston	839
Hatfield	11
Kyalite	82
Oxley	33
Penarie	

Condoulpe (34°46′S 143°32′E) is situated about 15 kilometres south of Balranald and 21 kilometres north of Kyalite.
