= Evans River (New South Wales) =

Location
- Country: Australia
- State: New South Wales
- IBRA: NSW North Coast
- District: Northern Rivers
- local government area: Richmond Valley

Physical characteristics
- Source: Tucombil Canal
  - location: near Woodburn
  - coordinates: 29°05′38″S 153°20′59″E
  - elevation: 19 m (62 ft)
- Mouth: Coral Sea, South Pacific Ocean
  - location: below Evans Head
  - coordinates: 29°06′48″S 153°26′12″E
  - elevation: 0 m (0 ft)
- Length: 17 km (11 mi)
- Basin size: 76 km^{2} (29 sq mi)

Basin features
- National park: Broadwater NP

Evans River, an open and trained youthful wave dominated, interbarrier estuary, is located in the Northern Rivers region of New South Wales, Australia.

== Course and features ==
Evans River rises from Tucombil Canal near Woodburn, near South Evans Head and flows in a meandering course generally east, south, and then northeast before reaching its mouth at the Coral Sea of the South Pacific Ocean below Evans Head, descending 21 metres (69 ft) over its 17 kilometres (11 mi) course.

== See also ==
- Rivers of New South Wales
- List of rivers of New South Wales (A–K)
- List of rivers of Australia
- Athanassio Comino, an oyster lease holder on the river as early as 1882
