= Stratheden =

Straheden may refer to:-

- Stratheden, Fife, a hamlet 2 miles west of Cupar, and just north of Springfield, in Fife, Scotland.
- Stratheden, New South Wales, a locality in the Richmond Valley, New South Wales, Australia.
- SS Stratheden or HMT Stratheden, a P&O passenger liner, troop transport and cruise ship launched in 1937 and scrapped in 1969
- Baron Stratheden, title in the Peerage of the United Kingdom
