= Woodburn, New South Wales =

Woodburn
- Town
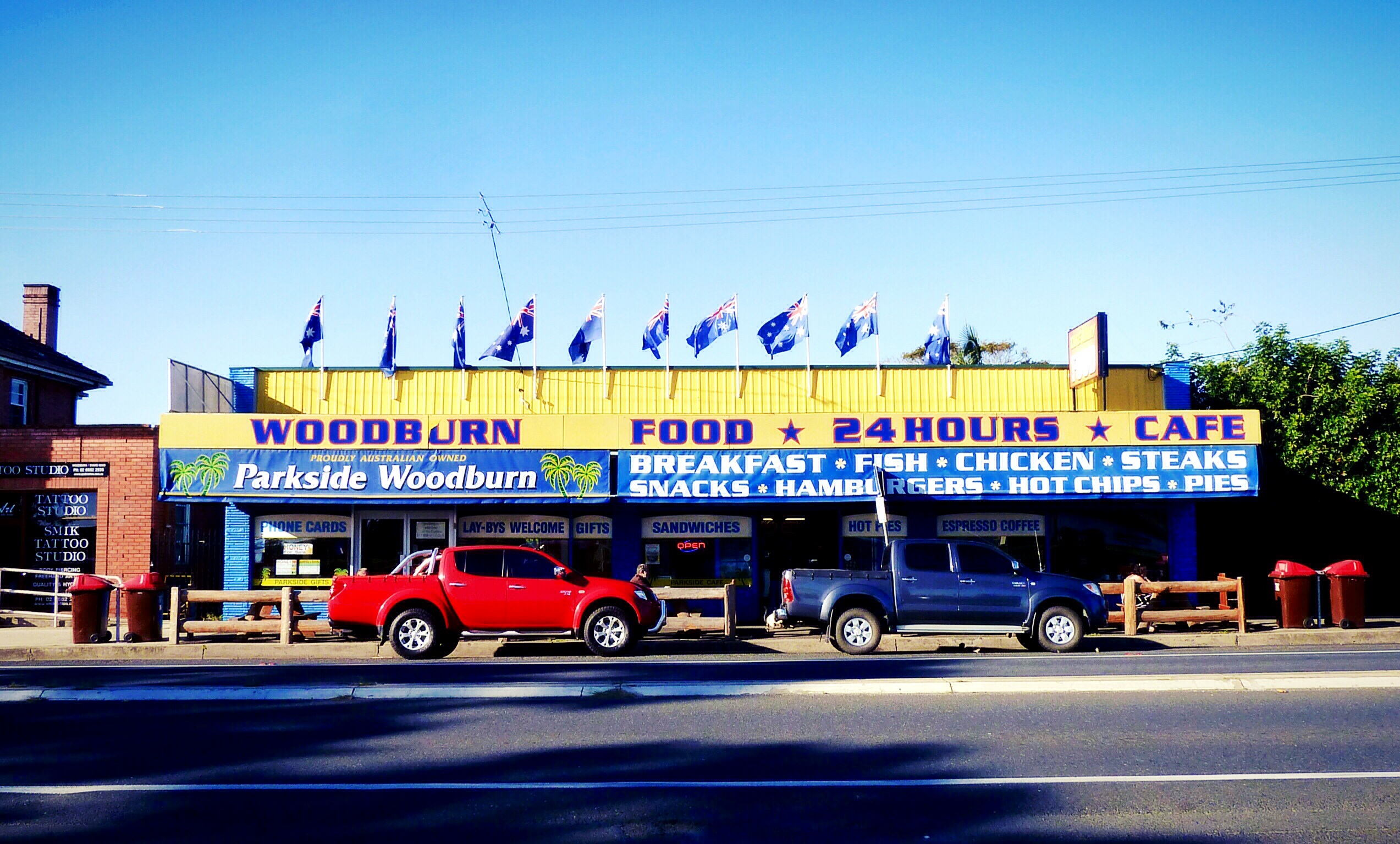

- Coordinates: 29°04′20″S 153°20′38″E
- Country: Australia
- State: New South Wales
- LGA: Richmond Valley Council
- Location: 690 km (430 mi) N of Sydney; 220 km (140 mi) S of Brisbane; 42 km (26 mi) SW of Ballina; 61 km (38 mi) N of Yamba
- Established: 1868

Government
  - State electorate: Clarence
  - Federal division: Page
- Elevation: 6 m (20 ft)

Population
  - Total: 678 (2021 census)
- Postcode: 2472
- Annual rainfall: 1,329.6 mm (52.35 in)

Woodburn is a small town on the banks of the Richmond River in New South Wales, Australia. Woodburn is 712 km north of Sydney, and 34 km south of Lismore. Until the town was bypassed in September 2020, the Pacific Highway passed through the centre of town. And its been through the Woodburn floods and a lot has been destroyed

== History ==
Prior to the arrival of European settlers in the 1840s, the Woodburn area—known as Maniworkan to the Indigenous inhabitants—was the home of the Bundjalung people. Woodburn was an important river port until the decline in river transportation along the Richmond led to a decline in the town's own fortunes. Prior to being bypassed, the income associated with the town's position on one of Australia's major highways was important to the local economy, as are the fields of sugar cane surrounding the town. The tourist resort of Evans Head is 10 km south-east of Woodburn.

Woodburn is part of the Richmond Valley Shire, the administrative headquarters of which is in nearby Casino. Huge flooding inundated the town for days in February 2022, destroying many homes, businesses and vehicles.

== Geography ==
=== Topography ===
Woodburn is situated in a river valley, as such it is both low-lying and relatively flat. with an average elevation of ~6 Metres. Coastal wetlands border its east, and knolls to its south.

The Richmond River flows through the centre of the town with most of the notable infrastructure surrounding it; before flowing up to Broadwater, then into the ocean at Ballina. Rocky Mouth Creek flows into the Richmond River from the southern end of the town. The Tuckombil Canal connects Rocky Mouth Creek to The Evans River, which flows out to the ocean at Evans Head.

=== Climate ===
Woodburn, according to the Köppen climate classification; has a humid subtropical climate (Cfa) with warm summers and generally mild winters. Weather patterns vary year-on-year in the region; particularly impacted by the El Niño–Southern Oscillation, with drought and bushfires commonly associated with 'El-Niño' events, and Rainfall and Flooding associated with 'La-Niña' events. Temperatures in the region are moderated by proximity to the ocean.

Historical population
Year	Pop.	±%
1966	530	—
1971	697	+31.5%
1976	610	−12.5%
1981	647	+6.1%
1986	602	−7.0%
1991	592	−1.7%
1996	607	+2.5%
2001	618	+1.8%
2006	618	+0.0%
2011	633	+2.4%
2016	614	−3.0%
2021	678	+10.4%
Source: Australian Bureau of Statistics data.

== Schools ==
- Woodburn Public School
- St Joseph's Primary School

== Transport ==
Until the town was bypassed in September 2020, the Pacific Highway passed through the centre of town.

Until a bridge opened in October 1981, the Richmond River had a cable ferry.
