= The Richmond River Herald and Northern Districts Advertiser =

Former newspaper in New South Wales, Australia

The Richmond River Herald and Northern Districts Advertiser was a newspaper published in Coraki, New South Wales, Australia from 1886 until 1942.

== History ==
The Richmond River Herald was first published on 9 July 1886 by Louis Ferdinand Branxton Benaud, the great-uncle of Richie Benaud. The first issue was almost never printed as the office and newspaper plant had been in flames a few hours before it was due to be printed. Louis Benaud made a career out of advocating for Coraki's interests and in the third issue the Herald argued for Coraki's incorporation into a municipality.

The Richmond River Herald ceased publication on 26 June 1942.

== Digitisation ==
The paper has been digitised as part of the Australian Newspapers Digitisation Program project of the National Library of Australia.

== See also ==
- List of newspapers in Australia
- List of newspapers in New South Wales
