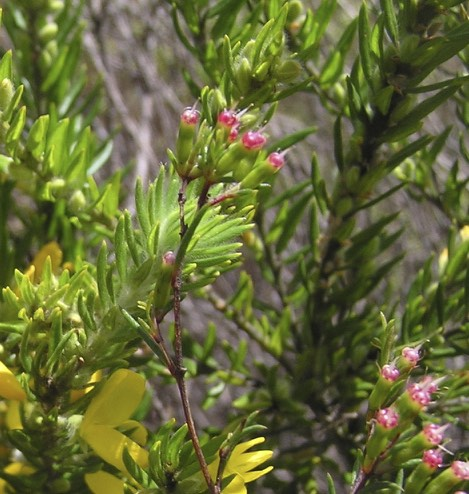
- Homoranthus virgatus in Broadwater National Park

Scientific classification
- Kingdom: Plantae
- Clade: Tracheophytes
- Clade: Angiosperms
- Clade: Eudicots
- Clade: Rosids
- Order: Myrtales
- Family: Myrtaceae
- Genus: Homoranthus
- Species: H. virgatus

Binomial name
- Homoranthus virgatus A.Cunn. ex Schauer
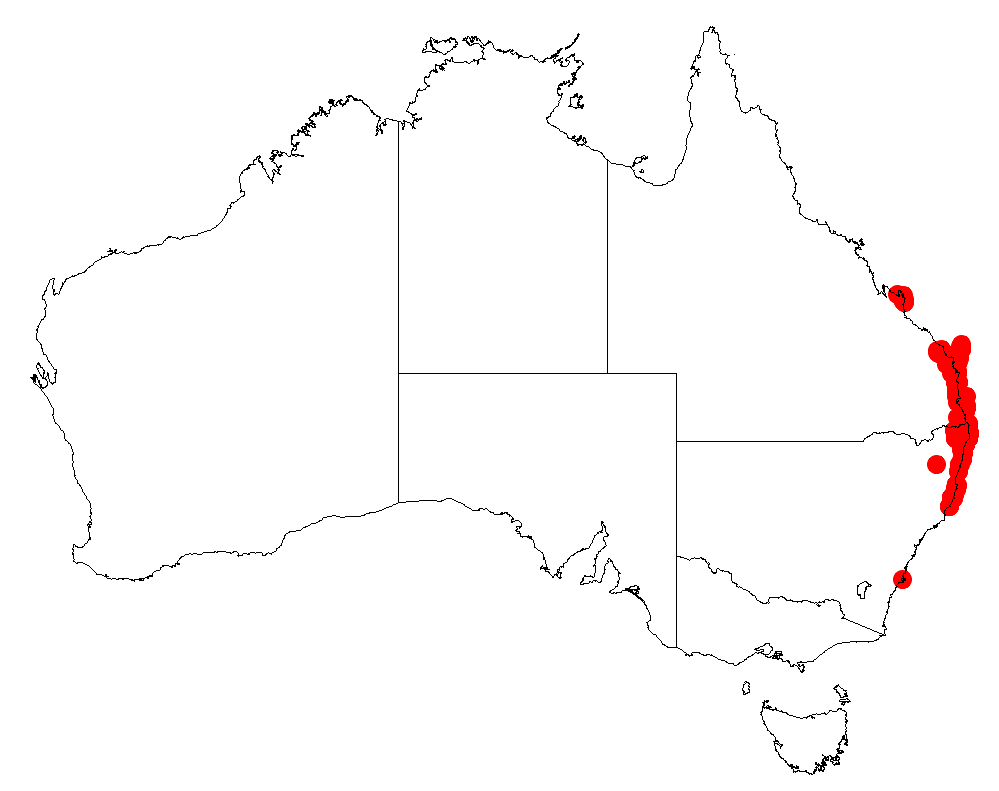
- Occurrence data from AVH

= Homoranthus virgatus =

Species of flowering plant

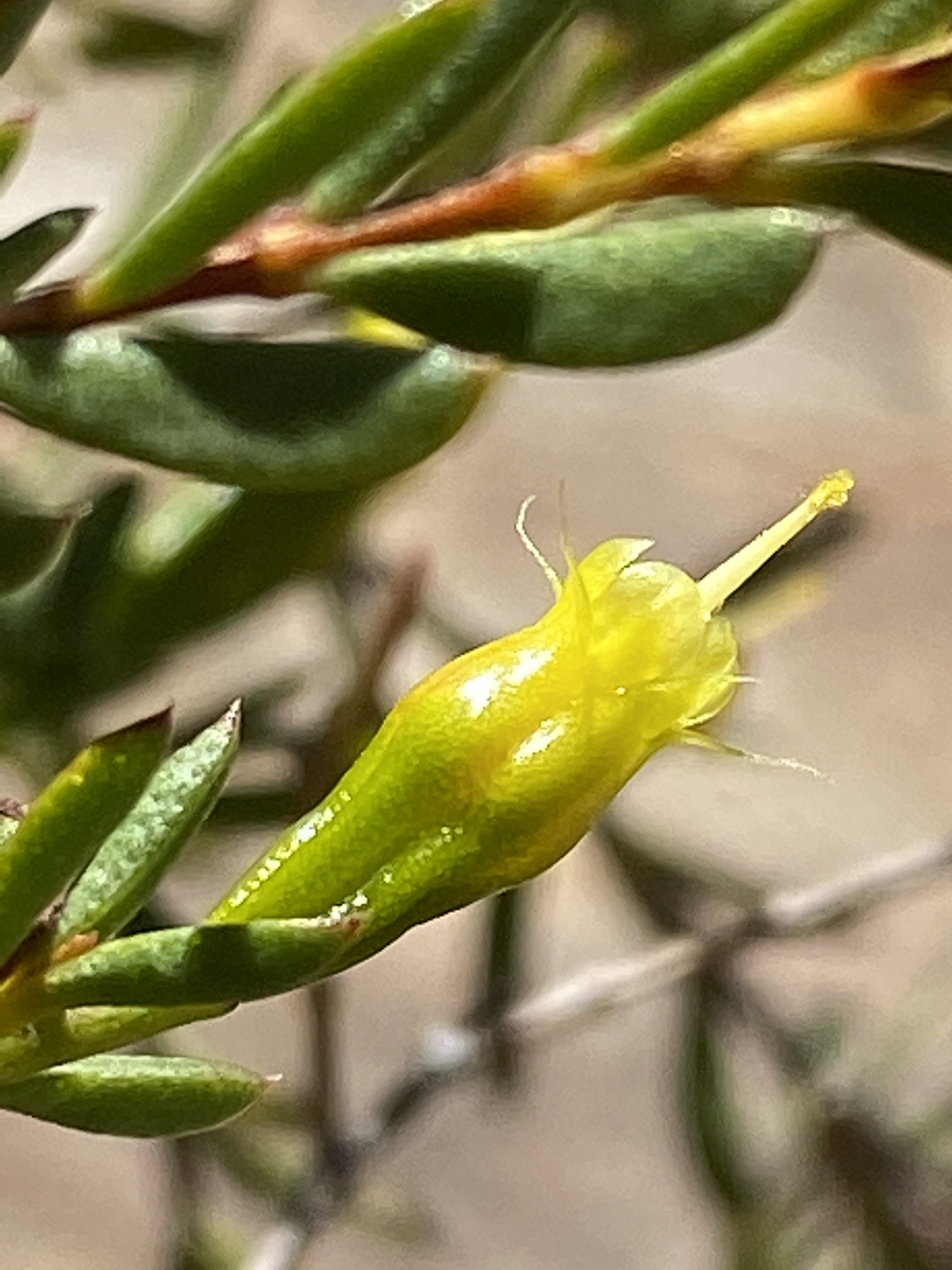
Flower

Homoranthus virgatus commonly known as twiggy homoranthus, is a species of flowering plant in the family Myrtaceae and is found growing in coastal areas of northern New South Wales and in Queensland. It is an upright shrub with wand-like branches, aromatic foliage and white to pink flowers in small clusters at the end of branches.

== Description ==
Homoranthus virgatus is an erect small shrub, 0.5–1.5 m (1 ft 8 in – 4 ft 11 in) high with smooth, stiff, lateral branches. The leaves are aromatic, arranged in opposite pairs at right angles to the preceding pair, 8–10 mm (0.31–0.39 in) long, and triangular in cross-section. The small, upturned, creamy-white to pink flowers are borne in pairs or fours at the end of branches in the upper leaf axils on a peduncle about 1 mm (0.039 in) long. The calyx tube is five-ribbed with wide, concave bracteoles, and the style extends about 2 mm (0.079 in) beyond the floral tube. Flowering occurs from August to September.

== Taxonomy and naming ==
Homoranthus virgatus was first formally described in 1843 by Johannes Conrad Schauer from an unpublished description by Allan Cunningham and the description was published in Monographia Myrtacearum Xerocarpicarum. The specific epithet (virgatus) is a Latin word meaning "of twigs" or "rodlike".

== Distribution and habitat ==
Twiggy homoranthus grows in semi-shaded or open situations from Byfield and south to Laurieton within 20 km of the coastline. Also on several islands close to the mainland of eastern Australia, e.g. Fraser, Bribie, Morton and Stradbroke Islands.

== Conservation status ==
Widespread, often locally common and well reserved.
