= Evans Head Memorial Aerodrome =

Airport in Australia

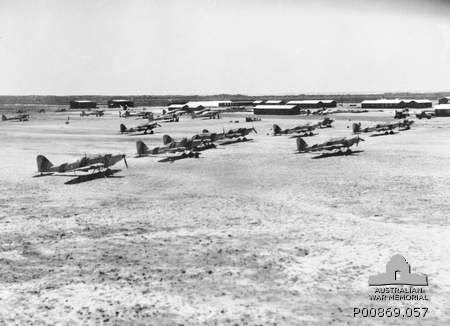
- Fairey Battle aircraft of 1BAGS at RAAF Evans Head in 1941
- IATA: EVH; ICAO: YEVD

Summary
- Airport type: Public
- Operator: Richmond Valley Council
- Location: Evans Head, New South Wales
- Elevation AMSL: 20 ft (6.1 m)
- Coordinates: 29°05′36″S 153°25′12″E

Map
- Location in New South Wales

Runways
| Direction | Length | | Surface |
| Direction | m | ft | Surface |
|---|---|---|---|
| 18/36 | 1,303 | 4,275 | Asphalt |
- Sources: AIP

Evans Head Memorial Aerodrome (IATA: EVH, ICAO: YEVD) is a heritage-listed airport in Evans Head, New South Wales. The airport is approximately 1 km (0.62 mi) north of the village. During World War II it was Royal Australian Air Force (RAAF) Station Evans Head supporting RAAF No 1 Bombing and Gunnery School (1BAGS) and subsequently the RAAF No 1 Air Observers School. At the height of operations there were three asphalt runways and one grass strip. Only a single asphalt strip is still in use by private aviation. It was added to the New South Wales State Heritage Register on 22 November 2002.

Richmond Valley Council with the assistance of the recently formed Evans Head Memorial Aerodrome Heritage Aviation Association (EHMAHAA) and Evans Head Air Park, has been actively supporting the restoration of a number of heritage items located on the aerodrome including the restoration of the last remaining Bellman hangar and the refurbishment and relocation of the original base canteen. The fully restored Bellman hangar is now used by EHMAHAA to display RAAF F-111 A8-147 and other significant heritage items related to RAAF Station Evans head and the history of Evans Head Memorial Aerodrome. The museum is open weekends 10 am to 4 pm (except ANZAC Day & Christmas Day) and is also open on Tuesdays between 9 AM - 12 PM.

== History ==
=== World War II ===
An airfield at Evans Head was first established in 1936, serving as an emergency landing ground however in 1937, the Commonwealth took control of the airfield for use as a military base. Between 1939 and 1940, flood mitigation works and additional land acquisitions were carried out by defence and state government authorities.

In December 1939, the creation of the Empire Air Training Scheme saw Australia undertake training of 28,000 aircrew over a three-year period. The No 1 Bombing and Gunnery School was established under the scheme at the RAAF Station Evans Head and was fully operational by December 1941. Sir Valston Hancock was appointed as the Station's first commanding officer, himself playing a key role in the location, design and development of the Station. Extensive bombing and gunner ranges were established to the north and south of the Station as well as a sea leg to the south. The entire Station covered 600 square miles (1,500 km^{2}). In addition to bombing and gunnery practice, the school also trained personnel for roles including Air Observers/Bomb Aimers, Wireless Operators/Air Gunners and Navigators. The main aircraft used for training were the Avro Anson and the Fairey Battle light bomber, of which some 70 operated from Evans Head.

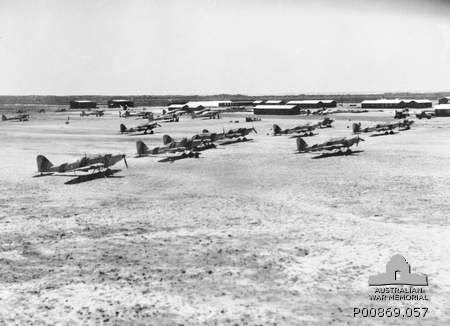
Fairey Battle aircraft at RAAF Evans Head in 1941

In late 1941 with Japan entering the war, the proximity of RAAF Evans Head to Brisbane made the base an important defensive asset in the event of an attack. As a defensive measure, 19 gun pits on the aerodrome equipped with .303 calibre Vickers machine guns were constructed. Aircraft from the base were also engaged in coastal surveillance duties. As many as 17 transportable Bellman hangars were erected on the base, and a substantial marine search and rescue unit operated from their own wharves in the nearby township. Other facilities at the base included accommodation for up to 1400 personnel, a hospital, garbage and sewerage services and recreational activities.

Over 5,000 trainees passed through No 1 Bombing and Gunnery School, including actor Chips Rafferty. More than 1,000 of those who trained here were killed during the war.

In 1943, 1BAGS was disbanded and No 1 Air Observers School relocated from RAAF Station Cootamundra to Evans Head, flying mainly Avro Anson and CAC Wackett aircraft. An estimated 630 aircrew passed through this school until it too was disbanded in 1944.

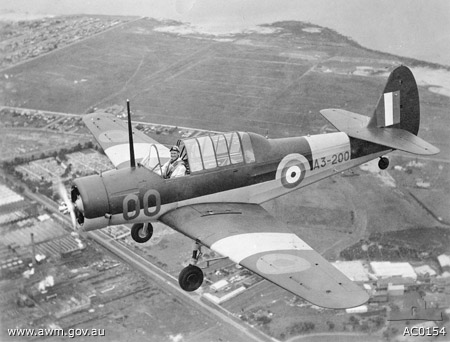
Australian CAC Wackett trainer as flown by many EATS schools

==== Satellite airfields ====
- Coraki Airfield (dispersal base)

=== Post War ===
Following the war, the airfield briefly used for commercial air traffic, with Butler Air Transport being the main airline offering services. whilst ownership remained with the Department of Defence. In 1952, defence transferred the Evans Head Aerodrome to the Department of Transport. The airfield was visited by Queen Elizabeth II during her 1954 tour of Australia. The remaining buildings of the RAAF Base were dismantled, demolished or relocated during the 1950s, and by the middle of the decade, commercial operations had relocated to the larger town of Casino. The airfield has since been used as an emergency landing ground, RAAF aircraft storage facility (all World War II vintage aircraft had been moved or disposed of by 1958) and ordnance depot. It has also been used as a staging facility for flood relief operations.

During upgrades at Casino Airport to allow the operation of Fokker F28 jets, Evans Head was reopened to commercial traffic for a short period in 1985. In support of this, runway 18/36 was extended to the current length of 1300m and one of the two taxiways allowing access to the apron area was resurfaced. These upgrades brought the airfield up to standards required to operate the Fokker F27 regional airliners used at the time. In 1992, an Airport Local Ownership Plan allowed the airport to be transferred to Richmond River Shire, and passed to its current owners, Richmond Valley Council when it was created by amalgamation in 2000. On 22 November 2002, the Evans Head Memorial Airport was added to the NSW State Heritage Register.

=== Redevelopment controversy ===
Since Richmond River Shire gained control over the airport in 1992, its future has been threatened several times by residential developments approved by council but in breach of the transfer deeds which state:

(Local government) "shall take such action as is within its power to create land use zoning around the aerodrome which will prevent residential and other incompatible development in areas which are, or which may be, adversely affected by aircraft noise."

An industrial estate now occupies much of the former residential area for the base. In the late 1990s, Richmond River Shire Council sought approval from the Department of Transport to subdivide land for residential development at the southern end of runway 14/32. Whilst this was approved by the department, there is substantial evidence and opinion that it was not in accordance with the original intention of the Airport Local Ownership Agreement. The residential estates encroached upon existing noise contours and led to council shortening the available distance of the runway and restricting the size and type of aircraft operations. The actions of council have also been criticised by veteran's groups.

In 2005, a management plan for the aerodrome was submitted by the Richmond Valley Council to the Heritage Office to allow the rezoning of airport land for the construction of a retirement village. The proposal gained more attention in 2007 when asbestos and heavy metal pollutants were confirmed to be present on the site. In April 2009, the development was approved by council, despite objections that the development was a land use planning conflict. Final approval was granted for the development to proceed in March 2012, however upon hearing submissions from several parties representing the interests of the general aviation community the Joint Regional Planning Panel the approval was conditional on the basis that landholders are unable to object to ongoing aviation activities at the airport.

== Description ==
The dominant "landmark" feature of the aerodrome is its runways surrounded by mown grass verges and low level heath scrub with views to the Great Dividing Range, Broadwater Sugar Mill and Evans Head Headlands. None of the original buildings and related facilities from WWII, such as water tanks and control tower, remain except for one (modified) Bellman Hangar.

The aerodrome has four landing strips and one remaining (modified) Bellman Hangar which is situated on the apron adjacent to the main north–south landing strip. It is the only remaining hangar on its original site, out of 17.

Another Bellman Hangar on the council depot site which was moved to Coffs Harbour and returned, but is not on its original site nor in its original condition. It has since been modified to suit workshop requirements.

There is also another smaller hangar to the north of the Bellman which is used by private aviators and another to the north-east of the Bellman also used by private aviators.

Three of the four runways are sealed - the main north–south runway being in better condition. The fourth runway that traverses all three appears as a scar in the landscape. This northeast–southeast runway has been slightly shortened by the subdivision.

Two short taxiways that lead to the main north–south runway are sealed and two others off the northeast–southeast runway are scars in the landscape. These originally led from the hangars.

The whole aerodrome site is situated on flat sandy loam heath land adjoining the village of Evans Head, Broadwater National Park on the north-west side, private and Crown land holdings, industrial land and road reserve, including the council depot and subdivision in the south-east corner.

The three sealed runways are in fair condition (as at November 2000) although grass is showing through the tarmac in some areas yet are still used by aircraft.

The grass verges are regularly mowed, mostly by local volunteers using equipment provided by the council.

The Bellman Hangar is in fair condition and is beginning to show surface rust on the eastern side (probably due to the proximity to the ocean) around the interfaces between the structural supports and lateral surfaces, particularly at the edges.

== Current facilities and operations ==
As of June 2012 only runway 18/36 remains in use, with a sealed surface 1,303 m (4,275 ft) long. The runway has no lighting and is suitable for daylight operations only. The Aeronautical Information Publication issued by Airservices Australia on 28 June 2012 shows runway 14/32 has now been decommissioned, but is still used for model aircraft. There is no fuel available at the airport. As there is only occasional traffic and no control tower, pilots use a Common Traffic Advisory Frequency to coordinate arrivals and departures, and must stay within defined airspace constraints andmonitor specific radio frequencies when the Evans Head Air Weapons Range 5 nautical miles (9.3 km) southwest of the airfield is in operation.

Evans Head Memorial Aerodrome is suitable for operations by recreational and general aviation category aircraft. It has also been used to support flood relief and firefighting operations. There are several private hangars in use on the airfield, as well as an original Bellman hangar, although this structure is out of use, in poor condition and awaiting restoration. A second Bellman hangar is on an isolated area of the former tarmac, now part of the surrounding industrial estate functions as a works depot for the Richmond Valley Council, although this has been substantially modified and was moved to the site from its original location at Coffs Harbour.

Since 1992, an annual event called The Great Eastern Fly-In has been held annually at the Evans Head Memorial Aerodrome. This event attracts aviators from all over Australia and is often visited by vintage aircraft and warbirds, many providing joy flights and aerial demonstrations. Visitors have the opportunity to camp at the airfield and the "Great Eastern" is a major event for the tourism industry in the community of Evans Head, with local businesses and associations operating many market stalls during the event.

=== Airpark development ===
A consortium, Evans Head Airpark Pty Ltd., submitted a proposal in 2009 to the Richmond Valley Council's advertisements for expressions of interest to purchase and redevelop the airfield, incorporating a residential airpark comprising some 60 housing lots, aviation related industries and supporting businesses, passenger services, a museum, a boutique hotel and convention centre. The consortium was headed by Waratah Coal CEO Peter Lynch and also includes Red Bull Air Race competitor Matt Hall and former Ironman and owner of Australia's largest private aviation fleet Grant Kenny, among other high-profile figures. In 2011, the consortium announced they were involved in tendering processes with the Department of Defence to receive decommissioned Royal Australian Air Force DHC-4 Caribou and F-111 aircraft for display in the museum to be centred on the surviving WWII Bellman hangar.

== Accidents and incidents ==
- On the morning of 10 November 1944, a flight of seven Bristol Beaufighters from RAAF Base Williamtown simulated an attack on Evans Head airfield. Following the attack sequence as aircraft manoeuvered to regain their formation, the third Beaufighter collided with the leader. Both impacted shallow water inverted, approximately 14 miles (23 km) south of the airfield, killing all four crew members on the two aircraft. The remaining five Beaufighters aborted the mission, landing at Evans Head and the RAAF Marine Section was deployed to render assistance, although there were no survivors.
- On 29 September 1977 F-111C A8-133 of No. 6 Squadron RAAF was struck by several birds while on a training run at the Evans Head Air Weapons Range. The birds impacted the cockpit canopy and incapacitated the crew. The instructor pilot (occupying the navigators seat) was able to initiate ejection, but this was outside the crew module's operating envelope and they were killed when the module impacted the ground. In a similar incident on 11 April 2008, another F-111 struck a pelican at the Evans Head range causing substantial damage to the nose of the aircraft and the failure of one engine. After an assessment of the damage the crew elected to return to RAAF Base Amberley rather landing at Evans Head.

== Heritage listing ==
The Evans Head Memorial Aerodrome has historical, social and cultural significance. The aerodrome is purported to be the largest RAAF training base (over 5000 personnel) in the Southern Hemisphere during World War II (No 1 Bombing and Gunnery School) under the Empire Air Training Scheme, and made a major contribution, through provision of trained personnel, to the Commonwealth's war effort (see Haughton-James & Manley, 1995). The site contains only one original Bellman Hangar of 17 that represents technical innovation for that period. The hangars were designed and built for Australian conditions by Sir Valston Hancock, Director of Works, who later became the first commanding officer for the base. The site has social significance to the many ex service-men and -women who were associated with the aerodrome, RAAF personnel, ANZAC Day celebrations, and fellow personnel, families and friends of people who served there and died during WWII. It is also significant to the people of the North Coast region, the residents of Evans Head and visitors who attend activities or are tourists. Moreover, it is significant because it is a substantial landmark, from the ground and from the air. It is a cultural site and continues to have an effect on the civilian, ex service, and defence population of the North Coast area of NSW and all visitors to the region.

Evans Head Memorial Aerodrome was listed on the New South Wales State Heritage Register on 22 November 2002 having satisfied the following criteria.

The place is important in demonstrating the course, or pattern, of cultural or natural history in New South Wales.

The item is historically significant because of its role as No 1 Bombing and Gunnery School (BAGS) for the Empire Air Training Scheme (EATS) which was an enormous Commonwealth undertaking to train air crew and personnel to assist the allies in World War II.

It was also the home to over 5000 RAAF personnel who trained there during WW II for active service in Australia and overseas. More than a 1000 of these lost their lives during training and in active service overseas.

The place has a strong or special association with a person, or group of persons, of importance of cultural or natural history of New South Wales's history.

The item is historically significant because of its association with Sir Valston Hancock and was the site of 17 Bellman Hangars (only one remains in its original location). The hangars were designed and built under the guidance of Sir Valston Hancock, Director of Works for the RAAF at the time. He subsequently became its commanding officer.

The item also has associations with the USAAF whose personnel trained and served with Australian RAAF personnel. A number of B-25 bombers landed or crash-landed near Evans Head.

The place is important in demonstrating aesthetic characteristics and/or a high degree of creative or technical achievement in New South Wales.

The item is aesthetically significant because of the landmark qualities. Its sheer size gives it a powerful sense of place and its proximity to the Evans Head village and the coastline emphasise its strategic location and the scope of the RAAF Base during the war. It is one of the few remaining large coastal sites which retains some sense of war operations.

The aerodrome was constructed with four runways that intersect each other. This was to accommodate aircraft landing at the site regardless of wind or weather conditions. A design using three runways or more has only been applied to the larger aerodromes such as those based in Sydney, Coffs Harbour, Dubbo, Moruya, Nabiac, Temora and Tocumwal.

The design of the Bellman Hangar was the Australian industry solution to the steel shortage during WWII. Steel was an essential source primarily used for the production of armaments and munitions and although used in buildings, it was preferred for larger structures.

As a result, the Bellman Hangar was produced and is an example of the earliest prefabrication techniques for the construction of hangars for wartime operations.

The place has strong or special association with a particular community or cultural group in New South Wales for social, cultural or spiritual reasons.

The item is socially significant because the aerodrome is of great importance to surviving Australian RAAF personnel that served at Evans Head and is a legacy to their families and to the personnel of other countries who were trained or based at Evans Head, including those from the UK, Holland, the US and Canada.

The aerodrome is a significant landmark from WWII and has strong connections to the people of Evans Head, to the people of the north coast region, and to the other major surviving aerodromes and associates sites in NSW.

The associated sites and structures in Evans Head are some of the more significant remaining landmarks from that era which visitors seek out during their visits to Evans Head and which are examples of the main features of buildings and sites that characterised the RAAF Base at the time.

The presence of the RAAF during and after wartime largely contributed to the growth of the town with many of the personnel staying on within the village after the RAAF disbanded the bombing and gunnery school. The association of the aerodrome and the town form an important part of the village's cultural identity.

The place has potential to yield information that will contribute to an understanding of the cultural or natural history of New South Wales.

The item is technically and research significant because of the technical innovations and the role of the RAAF Base both of which made important contributions to Australia's effort in the WWII.

The prefabricated Bellman Hangar and various accommodation buildings represent significant technical innovation and adaptation for that period. While there are other modified Bellman hangars in Australia, the only remaining hangar at Evans Head Aerodrome was one of the first to be built in Australia. The other structures include the Scout Hall and Tuck Shop which are good examples of the design and are in good condition, although they have been relocated.

The role of the RAAF Base, the aerodrome, its history and its structures is a potential subject for High School Students. The Evans Head Memorial Aerodrome Committee and the Evans Head Community School are currently discussing the potential for such a program.

The place possesses uncommon, rare or endangered aspects of the cultural or natural history of New South Wales.

The item is rare in relation to its unique role as the primary bombing and gunnery school under the EATS. This has been identified in a thematic study conducted which surveyed the World War II aerodromes and associated sites in NSW.

Its future protection and management is essential in terms of it being one of the largest WWII aerodrome sites in the State and its significance in the history of defence in Australia.

The place is important in demonstrating the principal characteristics of a class of cultural or natural places/environments in New South Wales.

The item represents an important class of WWII aerodromes in NSW because of its size, strategic location and its pivotal role in the training of RAAF personnel for the war effort.

== See also ==
- List of airports in New South Wales
