= Tomki, New South Wales =

Coordinates: 28°52′S 153°08′E

Tomki is a locality in northern New South Wales, Australia in Richmond Valley Shire. The name Tomki is derived from Bundjalung damgay, meaning "greedy".
