= Athanassio Comino =

Athanassio Comino (Greek: Αθανάσιος Κομηνός), (c. 1844–1897) was a Greek oyster merchant and businessman. Comino was born in Kythera, Greece in about 1844, son of Dimitrios Comino and his wife Agapy.

Comino arrived in Sydney in 1873 as a crew member on a sailing ship and found work at the Balmain Colliery. A fish-and-chips shop owned by a Welshman in Oxford Street, Sydney and his familiarity with seafood in the Greek islands pointed him to the idea of a similar venture. In 1878, he opened an oyster saloon a few doors down from the fish-and-chips shop. From 1882 he took up the lease of oyster beds at the mouth of the Lane Cove River, then Port Jackson and the Evans River on the north coast. His brother John Comino came to Australia in 1885 and operated oyster leases on the Bermagui River.

Relatives and friends from Kythera who came out to Australia opened other shops and the Comino name became known in fish shops, oyster bars and oyster leases. Comino became known as the ‘Oyster King’. He never married and at 53 died 30 December 1897 at Darlinghurst. He left an estate valued for probate at £5217 to his brother John, nephews and nieces.
