= Evans Head, New South Wales =

Seaside village in New South Wales, Australia

Evans Head
- Town
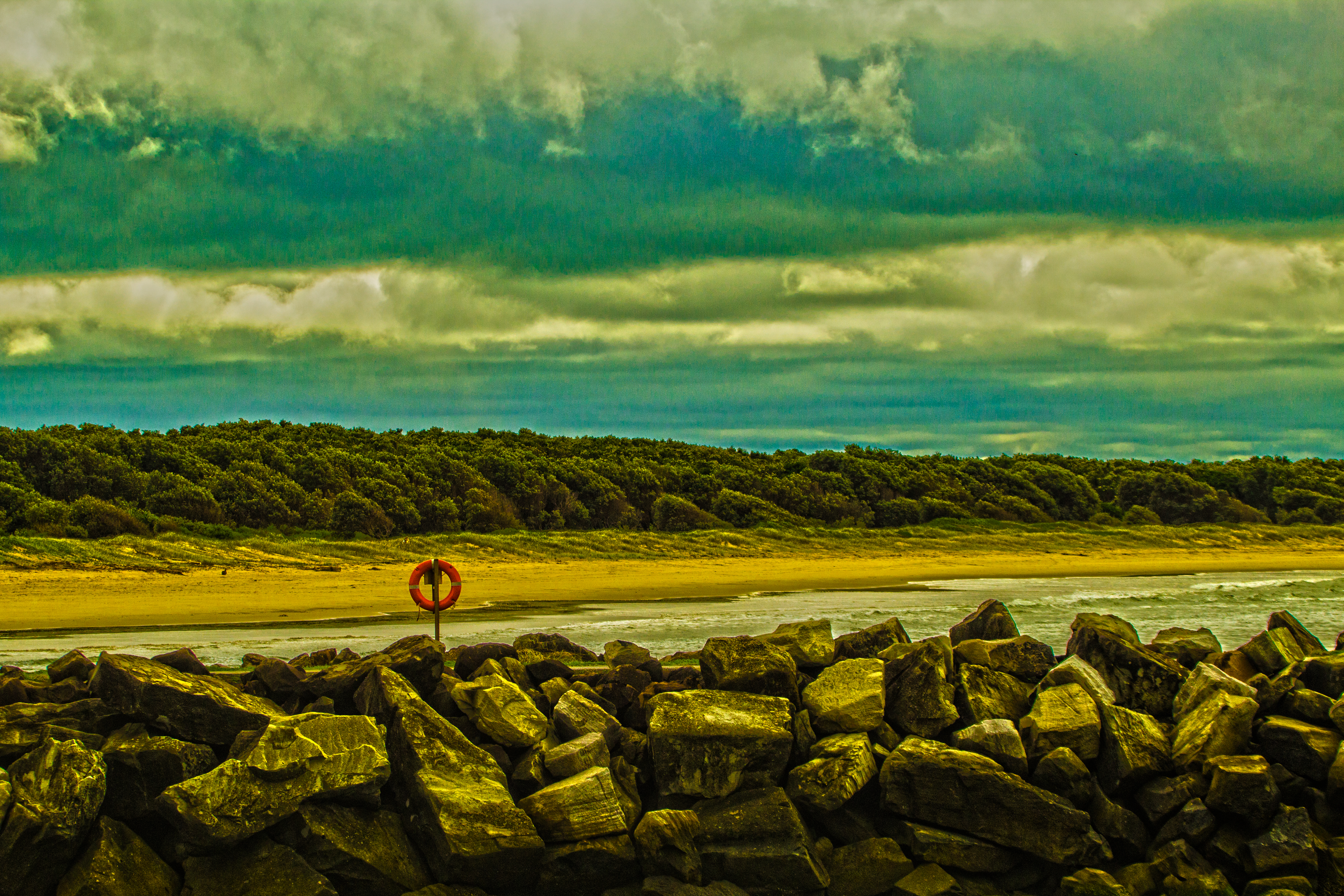
- Storm on the horizon, Evans Head, 2017

- Coordinates: 29°07′S 153°26′E
- Country: Australia
- State: New South Wales
- LGA: Richmond Valley Council
- Location: 701 km (436 mi) from Sydney; 220 km (140 mi) from Brisbane; 42 km (26 mi) from Ballina; 72 km (45 mi) from Yamba; 11 km (6.8 mi) from Woodburn
- Established: 1877; 149 years ago

Government
  - State electorate: Clarence
  - Federal division: Page
- Elevation: 63 m (207 ft)

Population
  - Total: 2,907 (2021 census)
- Postcode: 2473
- County: Richmond
- Mean max temp: 24.8 °C (76.6 °F)
- Mean min temp: 15.5 °C (59.9 °F)
- Annual rainfall: 1,533.3 mm (60.37 in)

Evans Head is a town in Richmond Valley Council of the Northern Rivers region of New South Wales, Australia. At the 2016 census, Evans Head had a population of 2,843 people. It is 726 kilometres north of Sydney, and 11 kilometres east off the Pacific Highway from Woodburn.

== History ==
Evans Head is situated on the traditional lands of the Bandjalang clan of the Bundjalung people.

Evans Head is named after a marine surveyor, Lt Evans, RN who carried out the first marine survey of the coastline in the area.

The Evans Head Air Weapons Range is located near the town. It has been used by the Royal Australian Air Force since 13 July 1949.

== Geography ==
=== Climate ===
Evans Head has a warm humid subtropical climate (Köppen: Cfa) with very warm, wet summers and very mild, drier winters. The wettest recorded day was 31 March 2017 with 287.0 mm (11.30 in) of rainfall. Extreme temperatures ranged from 45.0 °C (113.0 °F) on 12 January 2002 to 3.0 °C (37.4 °F) on 21 June 2004.

Climate data for Evans Head RAAF (29.18°S 153.40°E) (53 m (174 ft) AMSL) (1998-2025)
Month	Jan	Feb	Mar	Apr	May	Jun	Jul	Aug	Sep	Oct	Nov	Dec	Year
Record high °C (°F)	45.0 (113.0)	43.7 (110.7)	37.8 (100.0)	34.0 (93.2)	31.2 (88.2)	29.0 (84.2)	28.2 (82.8)	37.6 (99.7)	39.2 (102.6)	41.6 (106.9)	42.2 (108.0)	41.0 (105.8)	45.0 (113.0)
Mean daily maximum °C (°F)	28.8 (83.8)	28.2 (82.8)	27.1 (80.8)	24.8 (76.6)	22.1 (71.8)	20.0 (68.0)	19.9 (67.8)	21.6 (70.9)	24.3 (75.7)	25.8 (78.4)	27.0 (80.6)	28.3 (82.9)	24.8 (76.7)
Mean daily minimum °C (°F)	20.0 (68.0)	20.0 (68.0)	19.1 (66.4)	16.6 (61.9)	13.5 (56.3)	11.3 (52.3)	10.3 (50.5)	11.0 (51.8)	13.3 (55.9)	15.3 (59.5)	17.1 (62.8)	18.8 (65.8)	15.5 (59.9)
Record low °C (°F)	14.2 (57.6)	14.5 (58.1)	12.9 (55.2)	8.1 (46.6)	4.8 (40.6)	3.0 (37.4)	4.1 (39.4)	4.4 (39.9)	7.3 (45.1)	7.3 (45.1)	10.6 (51.1)	12.4 (54.3)	3.0 (37.4)
Average precipitation mm (inches)	141.8 (5.58)	168.2 (6.62)	230.9 (9.09)	170.0 (6.69)	118.5 (4.67)	160.4 (6.31)	79.2 (3.12)	89.5 (3.52)	58.0 (2.28)	100.7 (3.96)	114.9 (4.52)	97.8 (3.85)	1,533.3 (60.37)
Average precipitation days (≥ 0.2 mm)	12.6	14.0	17.7	15.1	14.4	12.5	10.7	9.4	9.3	11.6	12.3	12.4	152
Average afternoon relative humidity (%)	66	68	68	68	64	64	60	57	60	61	64	63	64
Average dew point °C (°F)	19.2 (66.6)	19.1 (66.4)	18.4 (65.1)	16.2 (61.2)	12.9 (55.2)	11.0 (51.8)	9.5 (49.1)	9.7 (49.5)	12.5 (54.5)	14.1 (57.4)	16.1 (61.0)	17.9 (64.2)	14.7 (58.5)
Source: Bureau of Meteorology (1998-2025)

== Heritage listings ==
Evans Head has a number of heritage-listed sites, including:

- Memorial Airport Drive: Evans Head Memorial Aerodrome

== Native title ==
In late April 2021, the Federal Court of Australia convened at Evans Head, where a native title determination was made over 7.2 square kilometres (2.8 sq mi) of land, consisting of 52 separate areas of land. The application had been launched in 1996, and the first determination made in 2013. Included in the land is a bora ring of great cultural significance near Coraki.

== Population ==
According to the 2016 census of Population, there were 2,843 people in Evans Head.

- Aboriginal and Torres Strait Islander people made up 4.5% of the population.
- 85.0% of people were born in Australia and 90.7% of people spoke only English at home.
- The most common responses for religion were No Religion 29.0%, Anglican 21.9% and Catholic 20.9%.

Historical population
Year	Pop.	±%
1966	1,098	—
1971	1,315	+19.8%
1976	1,591	+21.0%
1981	1,802	+13.3%
1986	1,903	+5.6%
1991	2,375	+24.8%
1996	2,613	+10.0%
2001	2,603	−0.4%
2006	2,630	+1.0%
2011	2,722	+3.5%
2016	2,847	+4.6%
2021	2,894	+1.7%
Source: Australian Bureau of Statistics data.

== Attractions ==
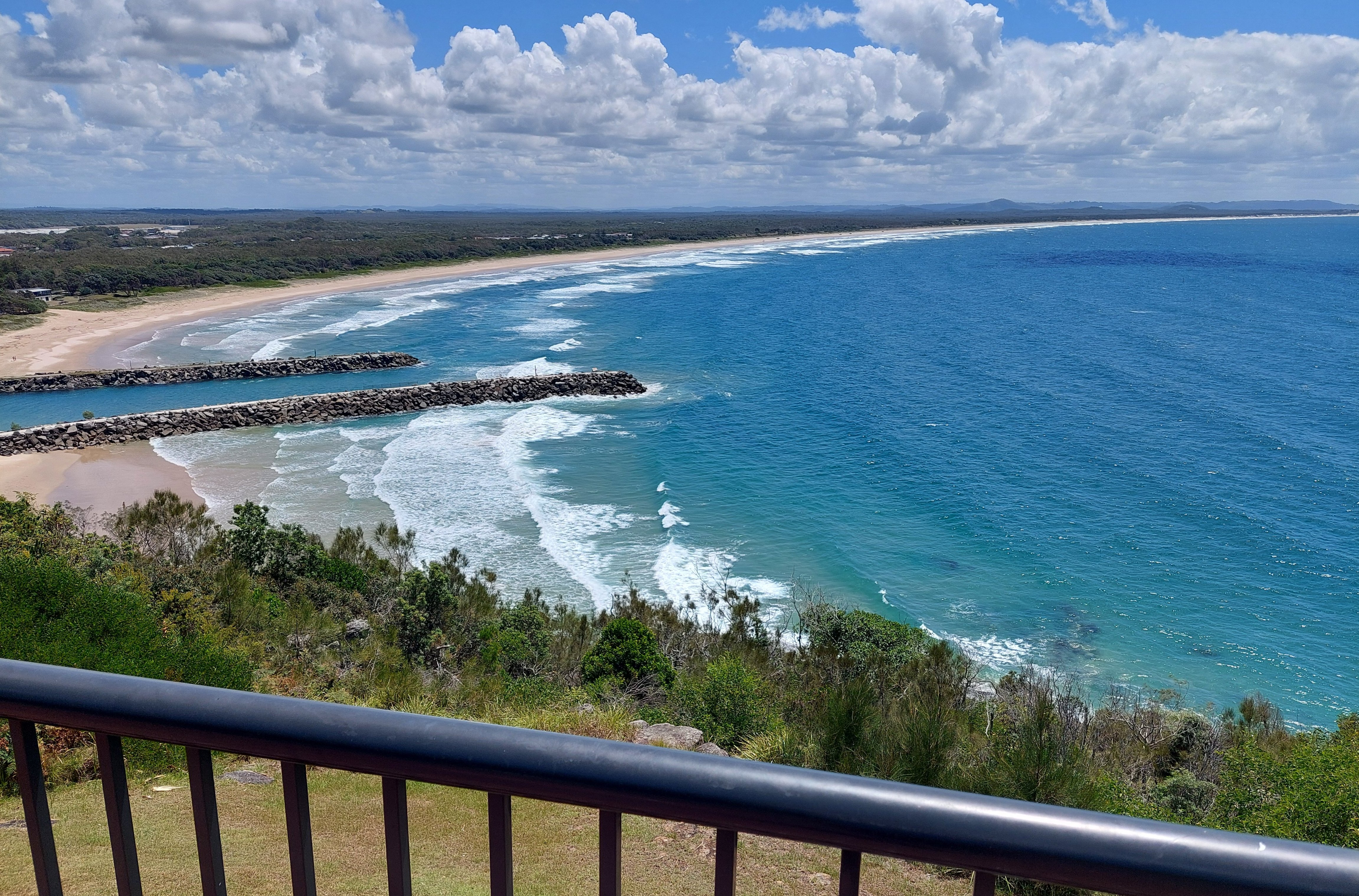
Evans Head break walls (river entrance) and Airforce Beach from Razorback Lookout, Feb 2025 (1)

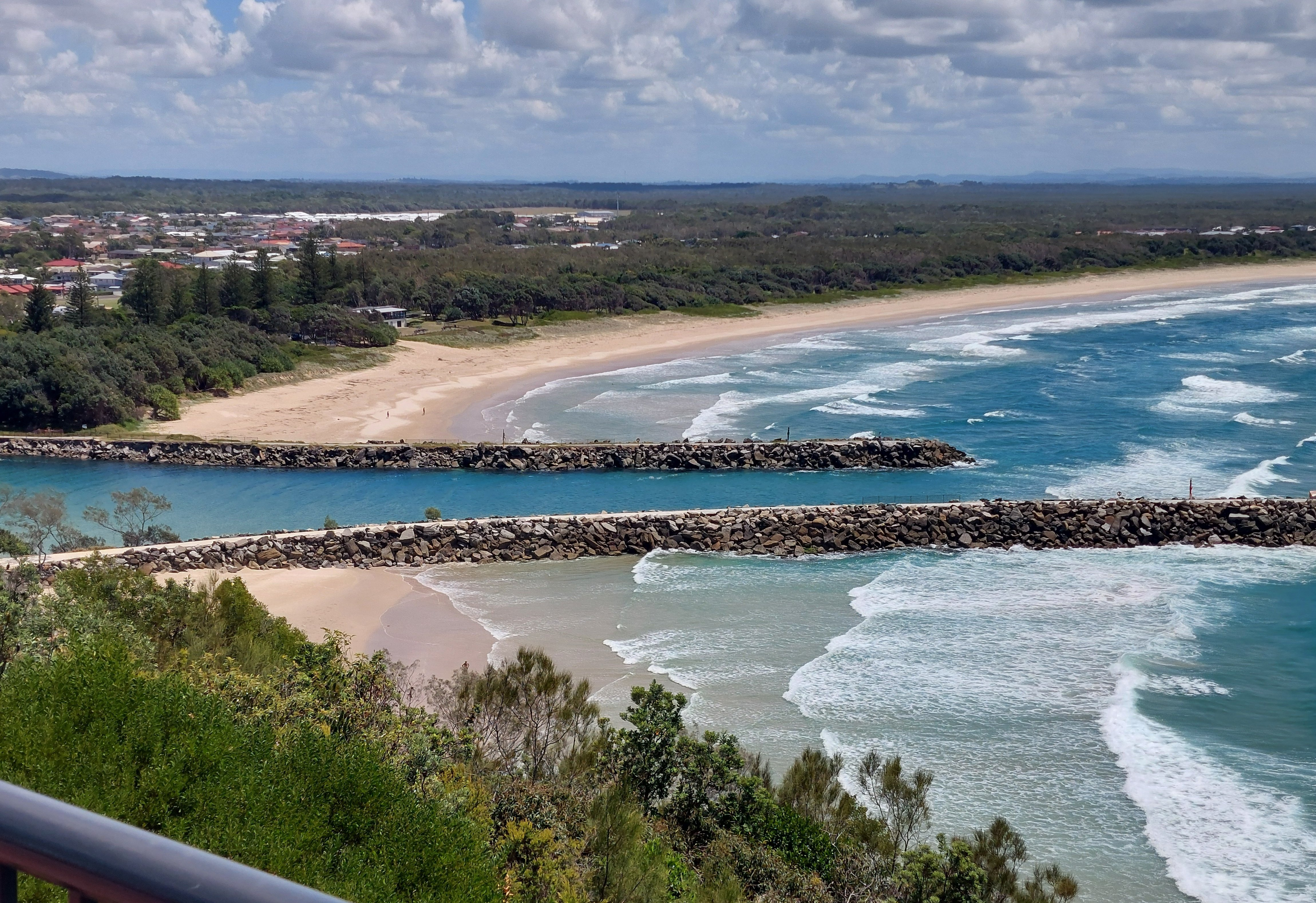
Evans Head break walls (river entrance) and Airforce Beach from Razorback Lookout, Feb 2025 (2)

It is a coastal town and a holiday resort, playing host to one of the largest holiday parks in NSW. It is sandwiched between Bundjalung National Park and Broadwater National Park. There is a wide curved beach, Airforce Beach that is popular for fishing, surfing and swimming.

Evans Head is home to the Illawong Hotel, an RSL club and one of the largest holiday parks in NSW, parts of which are pet-friendly. The Evans Head Holiday Park (formerly known as 'Silver Sands Caravan Park' ) has almost 600 sites and is located within walking distance of all the town amenities. The town has two supermarkets, two butchers, a number of clothing stores, cafes and other eateries that cater for the tourist population. Whilst the population is less than 3,000 people that number swells in school holidays.

The 1874 wreck of a timber schooner, Pilot, is visible on the beach north of the town in times of high erosion. The aerodrome hosts one of the few retired F-111 aircraft in Australia and a museum with a number of authentic aircraft on display.

== Transport ==
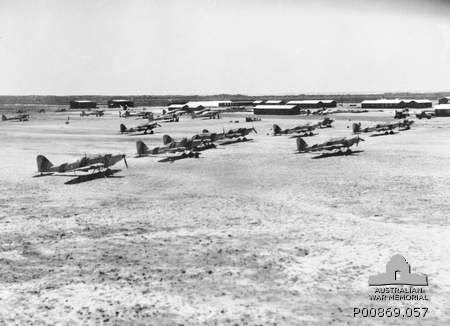
Fairey Battle aircraft, 1941

The town's airport, the Evans Head Memorial Aerodrome, formerly a RAAF base is heritage listed.

Northern Rivers Buslines operates two routes from Lismore, the 690 and 695, where the 695 also continues to Grafton from Evans Head. Ballina Buslines operates one route to Ballina via Woodburn, the 660.

NSW TrainLink operates a daily coach between Grafton and Byron Bay via Evans Head.

== Sport ==
The town has a bowling club and surf club. Evans Head Bombers rugby league club was established in 1999 and draws players from Broadwater, Woodburn and Coraki. The club fields junior and senior teams in the Northern Rivers Regional Rugby League competition. Golf is played at the Woodburn-Evans Head course with 11 holes and 18 tees.

== Industry ==
The main industry today is tourism with sugar cane growing just inland from the town. The town has a small industrial estate near the airport.

The town was traditionally a fishing village, with snapper fishing and prawning forming the basis of the town's local economy.

== The voyage of the Friendship R ==
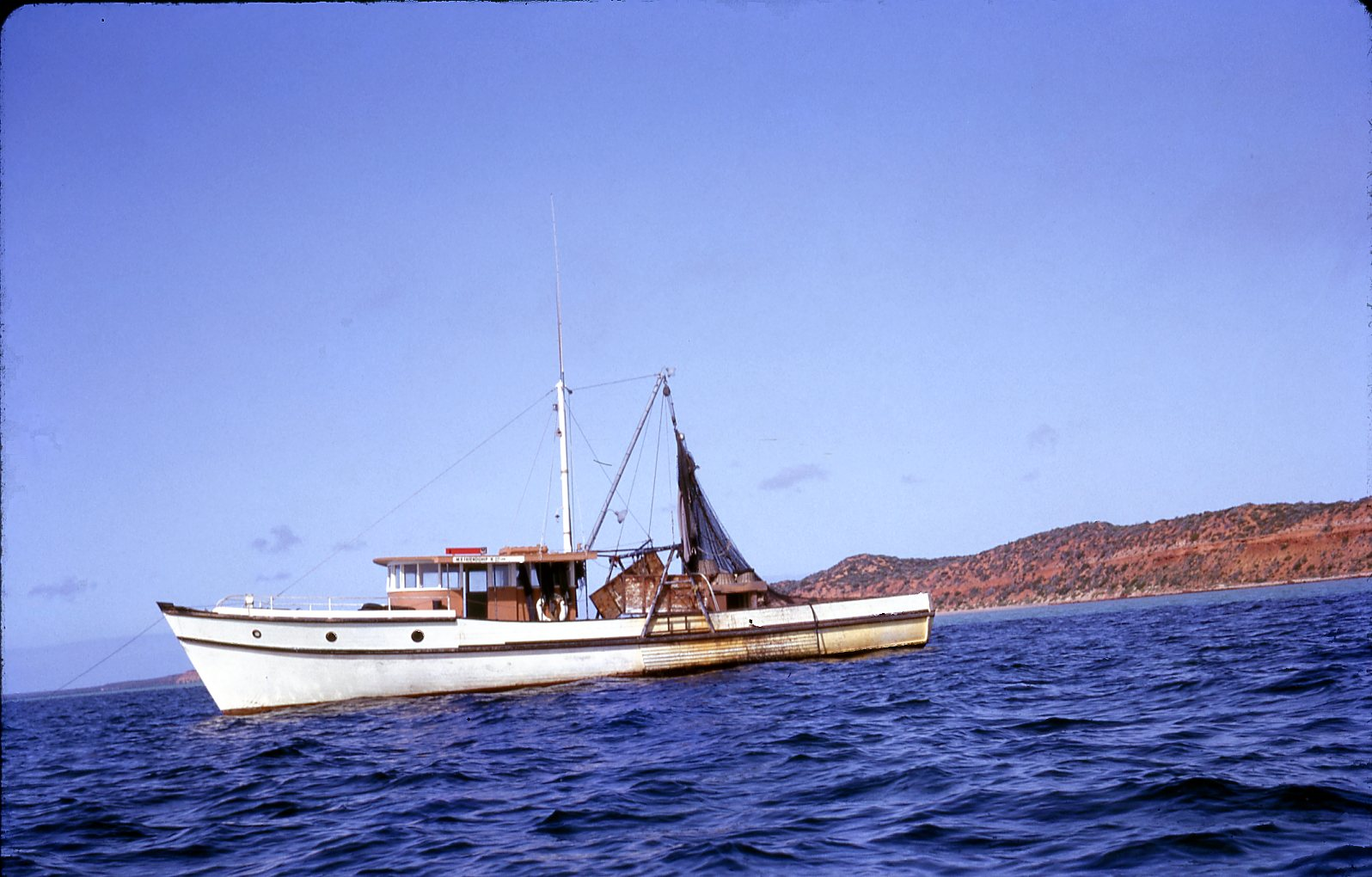
The Friendship R, the first fishing trawler to circumnavigate Australia

From the 1950s Evans Head has been distinguished as the first dedicated base of the oftentimes perilous prawn trawling industry in Australia. There was a prawn fishing fleet permanently moored in the estuary. Messenger recalls that many fisherman lost their lives. One instance in the 1960s was the trawler Wyowna was lost at sea with all hands on board.

At ca. March 1963 the Fisherman’s Cooperative of Evans Head was the base starting point of the journey of the Friendship R, the first fishing trawler to circumnavigate Australia. It was built in nearby Ballina by K.F. Barlow for Rex Montford, an experienced seaman and fisherman. With crewman Ken Messenger, a grandson of Dally Messenger, the rugby league superstar of the early 20th century, Montford set out on his epic journey.

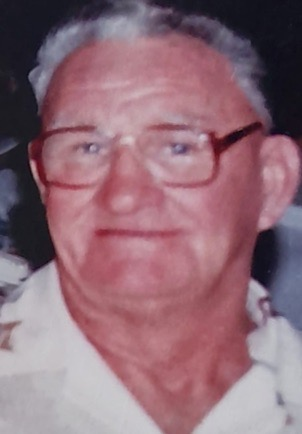
Rex Montford was the first skipper of a fishing trawler to circumnavigate Australia

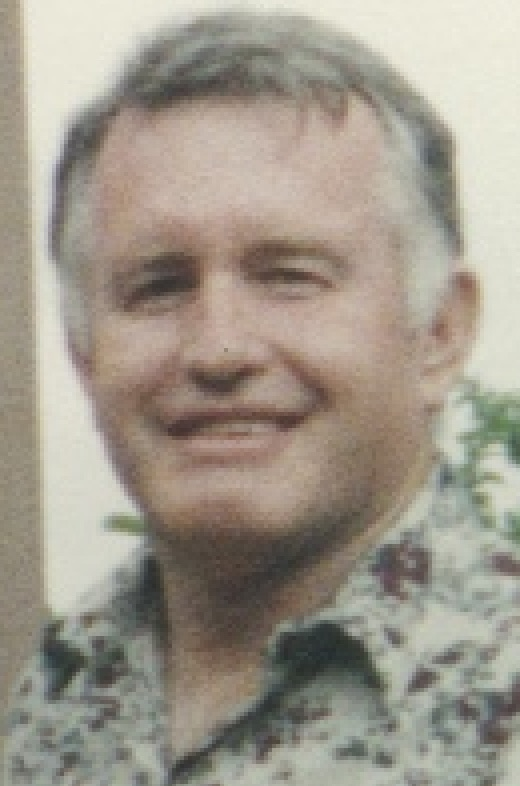
Ken Messenger 1990 - crewman on the Friendship R - the first fishing trawler to circumnavigate Australia

The Friendship R was originally contracted by the CSIRO to teach the fishermen at Shark Bay near Carnarvon WA, the art of trawling for prawns.

Leaving Evans Head the trawler journeyed south, stopping at Coffs Harbour, Broken Bay, Sydney, Eden and on to Port Fairy in Victoria. They then headed West to Port Lincoln and then across the Great Australian Bight to Western Australia aided only with a compass and a book of charts. They negotiated extremely hazardous reefs on their way into Fremantle.

As it turned out the fishermen at Shark Bay had already had been mentored by Jack Drinan, a skilled Queensland prawner who was in charge of six trawlers all named Nor but numbered one to six. This was the same Jack Drinan who was shipwrecked on 26 April 1963 and declared lost, but was sensationally found seventeen days later, in the open sea, clinging to the trawler’s refrigerator door. Montford and Messenger were part of the search party. In the company of Drinan and his surviving boats the Friendship R saw out the rest of the fishing and prawning season, while domiciled at the Shark Bay whaling station.

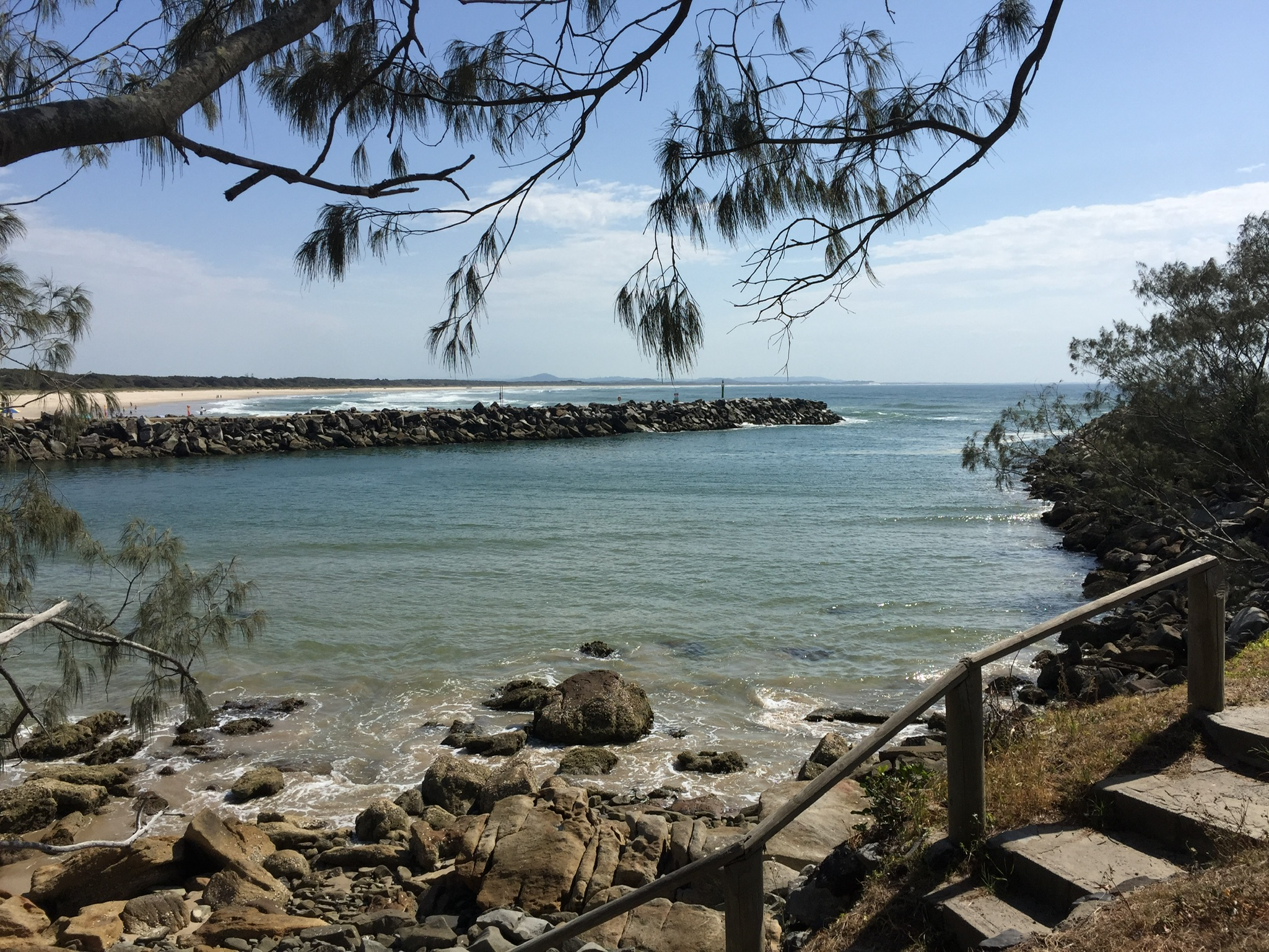
The Evans Head oftentimes dangerous Breakwater

In October 1963 Montford and Messenger decided to leave Carnarvon and return to Evans Head by the top end of the Australian continent.

In the company of two other boats, the Toowoon Bay and the Rambler, they proceeded along the coastline north to Exmouth Gulf and then east to Darwin. On this leg of the trip, a crisis occurred when, in a calm sea, their engine failed. The sails, gifted by Sydney yachtsman Englebert "Boy" Messenger, were not helpful as there was no wind. Fortunately, Reg Massey, skipper of the Rambler sensed something was wrong, doubled back, found the Friendship R and towed it into the port of Darwin.

When all was repaired and overhauled in Darwin the Friendship R set out across the unpredictable Gulf of Carpentaria. They stopped at Elcho Island where they received enthusiastic hospitality from the locals.

They were similarly welcomed at Thursday Island. They then proceeded back to Evans Head via Cairns and Tin Can Bay. The Friendship R was the first fishing trawler or similar vessel to circumnavigate Australia. It is considered a pioneer voyage in Australia's history. Messenger left for other pursuits and Rex Montford lived out his life in Evans Head, honoured and respected by the local population. He is buried in the local cemetery.
