= Richmond Valley Council =

Local government area in New South Wales, Australia

Richmond Valley
- Local government area
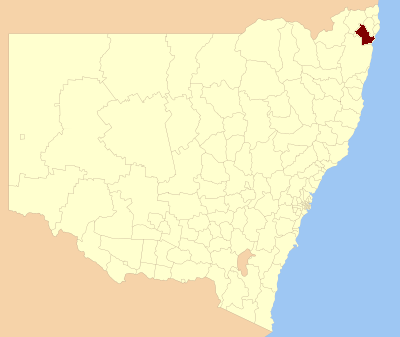
- Location in New South Wales
- Interactive map of Richmond Valley
- Coordinates: 28°52′S 153°03′E
- Country: Australia
- State: New South Wales
- Region: Northern Rivers
- Established: 21 February 2000
- Council seat: Casino

Government
  - Mayor: Robert Mustow (independent)
  - State electorate: Clarence
  - Federal division: Page

Area
  - Total: 3,051 km^{2} (1,178 sq mi)

Population
  - Totals: 23,565 (2021); 23,399 (2018 est.)
  - Density: 7.7237/km^{2} (20.004/sq mi)
- Website: Richmond Valley
LGAs around Richmond Valley
Kyogle	Lismore	Ballina
Clarence Valley	Richmond Valley	Tasman Sea
Clarence Valley	Clarence Valley	Tasman Sea

Richmond Valley Council (RVC) is a local government area on the Northern Rivers region of north-eastern New South Wales, Australia. RVC services an area of 3,051 square kilometres (1,178 sq mi) and draws its name from the Richmond River, which flows through most of the council area. The area under management is located adjacent to the Bruxner Highway, Pacific Highway, and the North Coast railway line.

It is a rural area for the most part, with most industries involving cattle and crop growing, such as sugar cane, wheat, and pecan plantation.

The mayor of the Richmond Valley Council is Robert Mustow, an independent politician.

== History ==
Following a petition of 76 ratepayers, elections were held 22 March 1880 for the Casino Council. Tomki Shire Council merged with Woodburn in 1976 to become the Richmond River Shire Council, which amalgamated with the Municipality of Casino into the Richmond Valley Council in February 2000.

== Heritage listings ==
The Richmond Valley Council has a number of heritage-listed sites, including:

- High Conservation Value Old Growth forest

== Towns and localities ==
- Casino
- Backmede
- Boorabee Park
- Bora Ridge
- Broadwater
- Bungawalbin
- Busbys Flat
- Camira Creek
- Clearfield
- Clovass
- Codrington
- Coombell
- Coraki
- Dobies Bight
- Dyraaba
- Ellangowan
- Evans Head
- Fairy Hill
- Greenridge
- Hogarth Range
- Irvington
- Leeville
- Myrtle Creek
- Naughtons Gap
- New Italy
- Piora
- Rappville
- Rileys Hill
- Shannon Brook
- Spring Grove
- Stratheden
- Tatham
- Tomki
- Upper Mongogarie
- Whiporie
- Woodburn
- Woodview
- Wyan
- Yorklea

== Demographics ==
At the 2016 census, there were 23,164 people in the Richmond Valley local government area, of these 49.5 per cent were male and 50.5 per cent were female. Aboriginal and Torres Strait Islander people made up 6.6 per cent of the population, which was significantly higher than the national and state averages of 2.5 per cent. The median age of people in the Richmond Valley area was 42 years, which was marginally higher than the national median of 37 years. Children aged 0 – 14 years made up 20.8 per cent of the population and people aged 65 years and over made up 19.6 per cent of the population. Of people in the area aged 15 years and over, 47.6 per cent were married and 13.7 per cent were either divorced or separated.

Population growth in the Richmond Valley area between the 2001 census and the 2006 census was 4.9 per cent; and in the subsequent five years to the 2011 census, the population growth was 3.4 per cent. When compared with total population growth of Australia for the same periods, being 5.78 per cent and 8.32 per cent respectively, population growth in the Richmond Valley local government area was significantly lower than the national average. The median weekly income for residents within the Richmond Valley area was marginally lower than the national average.

At the 2011 census, the proportion of residents in the Richmond Valley local government area who stated their ancestry as Australian or Anglo-Celtic exceeded 86 per cent of all residents (national average was 65.2 per cent). In excess of 16 per cent of all residents in the Richmond Valley at the 2011 census nominated no religious affiliation, compared to the national average of 22.3 per cent. Meanwhile, affiliation with Christianity exceeded 66 per cent, which was significantly higher than the national average of 50.2 per cent. As at the census date, compared to the national average, households in the Richmond Valley local government area had a significantly lower than average proportion (3.3 per cent) where two or more languages are spoken (national average was 20.4 per cent); and a significantly higher proportion (93.8 per cent) where English only was spoken at home (national average was 76.8 per cent).

Selected historical census data for the Richmond Valley local government area
Census year		2001	2006	2011
Population	Estimated residents on Census night	20,326	21,313	22,037
Population	LGA rank in terms of size within New South Wales			67
Population	% of New South Wales population			0.32%
Population	% of Australian population	0.11%	0.11%	▼0.10%
Cultural and language diversity				
Ancestry, top responses	Australian			35.6%
Ancestry, top responses	English			31.4%
Ancestry, top responses	Irish			9.6%
Ancestry, top responses	Scottish			6.6%
Ancestry, top responses	German			3.1%
Language, top responses (other than English)	Italian	0.3%	0.3%	0.3%
Language, top responses (other than English)	Dutch	n/c	n/c	▲0.1%
Language, top responses (other than English)	German	0.1%	0.1%	0.1%
Language, top responses (other than English)	Tagalog	0.1%	0.1%	0.1%
Language, top responses (other than English)	Filipino	n/c	▲0.1%	0.1%
Religious affiliation				
Religious affiliation, top responses	Catholic	29.0%	▼28.2%	▼27.4%
Religious affiliation, top responses	Anglican	29.4%	▼27.4%	▼26.3%
Religious affiliation, top responses	No Religion	9.9%	▲13.1%	▲16.8%
Religious affiliation, top responses	Presbyterian and Reformed	7.6%	▼7.5%	▼6.6%
Religious affiliation, top responses	Uniting Church	7.5%	▼6.0%	▼5.7%
Median weekly incomes				
Personal income	Median weekly personal income		A$342	A$407
Personal income	% of Australian median income		73.4%	▼70.5%
Family income	Median weekly family income		A$826	A$956
Family income	% of Australian median income		70.5%	▼64.6%
Household income	Median weekly household income		A$651	A$789
Household income	% of Australian median income		63.4%	▲63.9%

== Council ==
=== Current composition and election method ===
Richmond Valley Council is composed of seven councillors, including the mayor, for a fixed four-year term of office. The mayor is directly elected while the six other councillors are elected proportionally as one entire ward. The most recent election was held on 4 December 2021, and the makeup of the council, including the mayor, is as follows:

Party	Councillors
Robert Mustow's Group B	5
Australian Labor Party	1
Independents	1
Total	7

The current Council, elected in 2021, is:

Councillor	Party	Notes
Robert Mustow	Robert Mustow's Group B	Mayor
Steve Morrissey	Robert Mustow's Group B	Deputy Mayor
Sam Cornish	Robert Mustow's Group B	
Patrick Deegan	Labor	
Robert Hayes	Independent	
Sandra Humphrys	Robert Mustow's Group B	
Debra McGillan	Robert Mustow's Group B	

== Election results ==
=== 2024 ===
2024 New South Wales local elections: Richmond Valley
Party	Candidate	Votes	%	±%
Independent	1. Robert Mustow (elected mayor); 2. Stephen Morrissey (elected 1); 3. Sandra Duncan-Humphrys (elected 4); 4. Samuel Cornish (elected 5)	5,962	44.2	−13.1
A Time For Change	1. John Walker (elected 3); 2. Stuart George; 3. Kylie O'Reilly; 4. Scott Brereton; 5. Anne Toohey	2,819	20.9	
Richmond Valley Voices	1. Lyndall Murray (elected 2); 2. Bianca Rayner; 3. Simone Barker; 4. Samuel Allis; 5. Kylie Maunder; 6. Nathan Scully; 7. Hanabeth Luke	2,810	20.8	
Independent	1. Robert Hayes (elected 6); 2. Debra McGillan; 3. Rachel Arthur; 4. Tracey Knox; 5. Neale Genge; 6. Daniel Simpson	1,747	13.0	+1.4
Independent	William Drew	151	1.1	
Total formal votes		13,489	92.8	
Informal votes		1,044	7.2	
Turnout		14,533	86.9	

=== 2021 ===
Elected councillor	Party
Steve Morrissey	Independent (Group B)
Sam Cornish	Independent (Group B)
Sandra Humphrys	Independent (Group B)
Debra McGillan	Independent (Group B)
Patrick Deegan	Labor
Robert Hayes	Independent (Group D)

2021 New South Wales local elections: Richmond Valley
Party	Candidate	Votes	%	±%
Independent (Robert Mustow's Group B)		7,346	57.6	
Labor		1,769	13.9	
Independent (Group D)		1,457	11.4	
Independent (Group A)		1,281	10.0	
Independent (Group C)		776	6.1	
Independent	Robyn Kapeen	127	1.0	
Total formal votes		12,756	90.7	
Informal votes		1,313	9.3	
Turnout		14,069	85.4	

== See also ==
- Local government areas of New South Wales
