= Broadwater, New South Wales =

Town in Richmond Valley, New South Wales

Coordinates: 29°01′S 153°26′E

Broadwater is a small town which sits within the Richmond Valley and City of Lismore local government areas, in the Northern Rivers region of New South Wales, Australia. It is 52 kilometres (32 mi) from the regional centre of Casino and 35.5 kilometres (22.1 mi) from Lismore.

The traditional owners of this region are the Bundjalung people.

In 2021, the town had a population of 524 people. It is on the Pacific Highway and it is adjacent to the Broadwater National Park.

== History ==
The history of Broadwater has largely revolved around its sugar mill. In 1863 Henry Cook and Alexander MacDonald became the first people to select land in the area. To begin with, sugar was grown and crushed on the small private farms in the region.

The CSR opened the town's sugar mill in 1880. In the early days sugar cane was grown as far up the Richmond River as the town of Bexhill and was carried to the mill on punts. In 1978 CSR sold the mill to the newly formed New South Wales Sugar Milling Cooperative, which established its head office at Broadwater.

The nearby Riley's Hill Dock began operation in the late 19th century and many punts, river boats and larger vessels were built in the dry dock there. One of its last major jobs was the restoration of the ferry South Steyne in the 1980s.

Today Broadwater is the centre of the region's highly mechanised sugar industry, which is still a major employer. In recent years the area has also seen an influx of new settlers, attracted by its peaceful rural lifestyle.

== Population ==
Historical population
Year	Pop.	±%
1971	388	—
1976	363	−6.4%
1981	397	+9.4%
1986	424	+6.8%
1991	488	+15.1%
1996	504	+3.3%
2001	411	−18.5%
2006	463	+12.7%
2011	436	−5.8%
2016	484	+11.0%
2021	524	+8.3%
Source: Australian Bureau of Statistics data.

In the 2021 Census, there were 524 people in Broadwater. 81.1% of people were born in Australia and 85.7% of people spoke only English at home. The most common responses for religion were No Religion 43.7%, Catholic 17.9% and Anglican 11.5%.

== Gallery ==
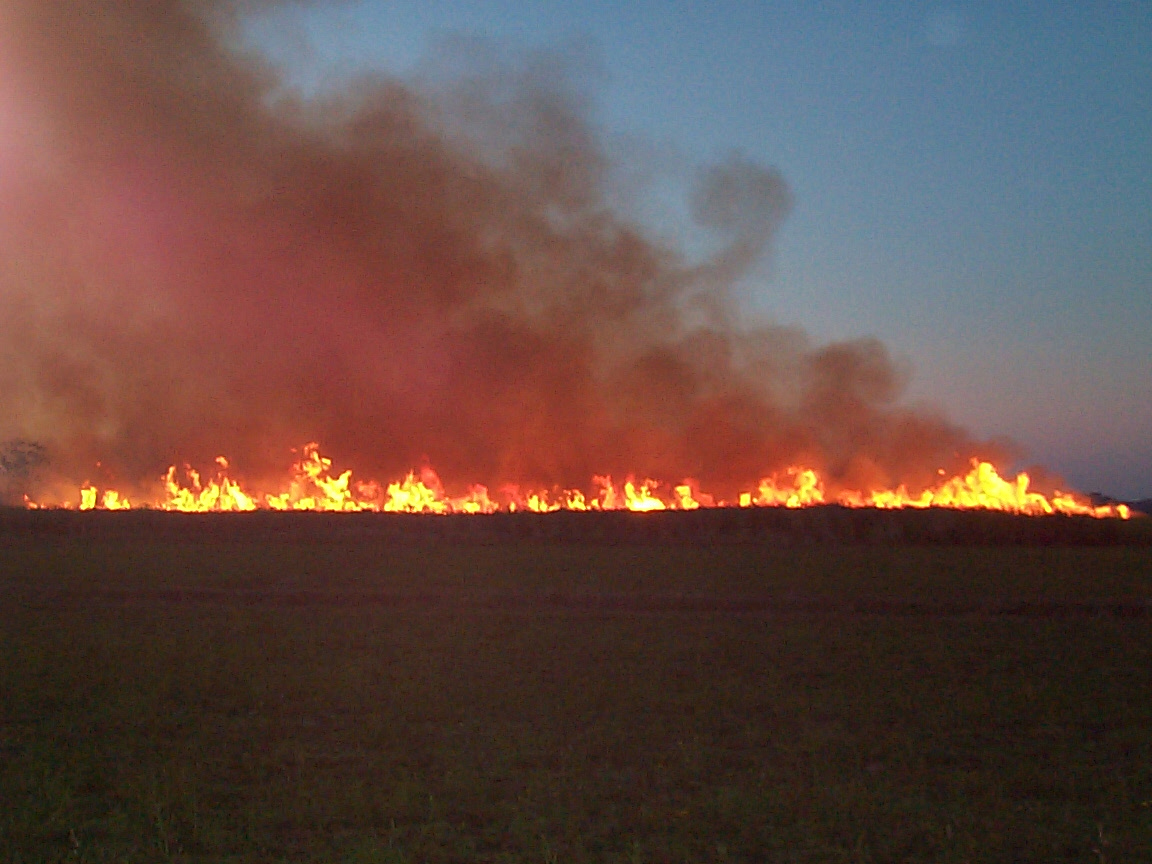
Sugar cane burns before harvesting for the Broadwater mill, 2007

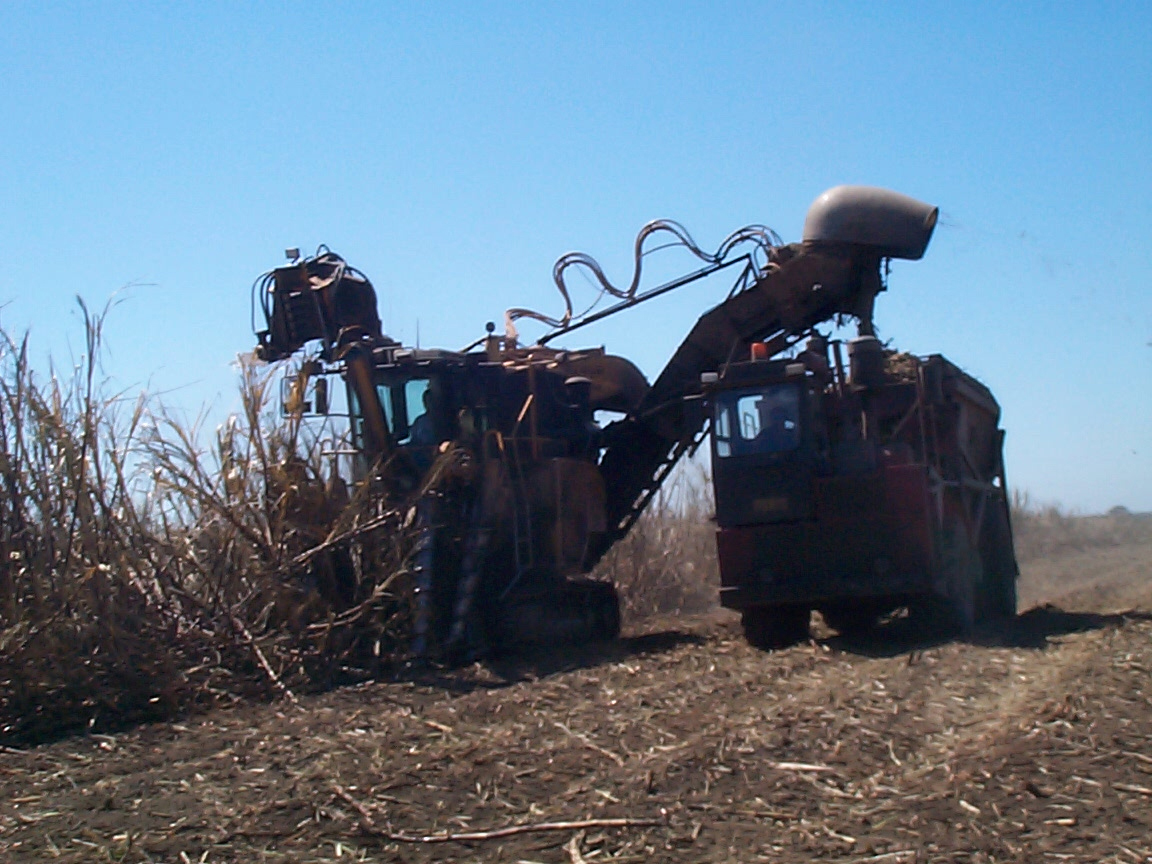
A cane harvester collects cane for the mill, 2007

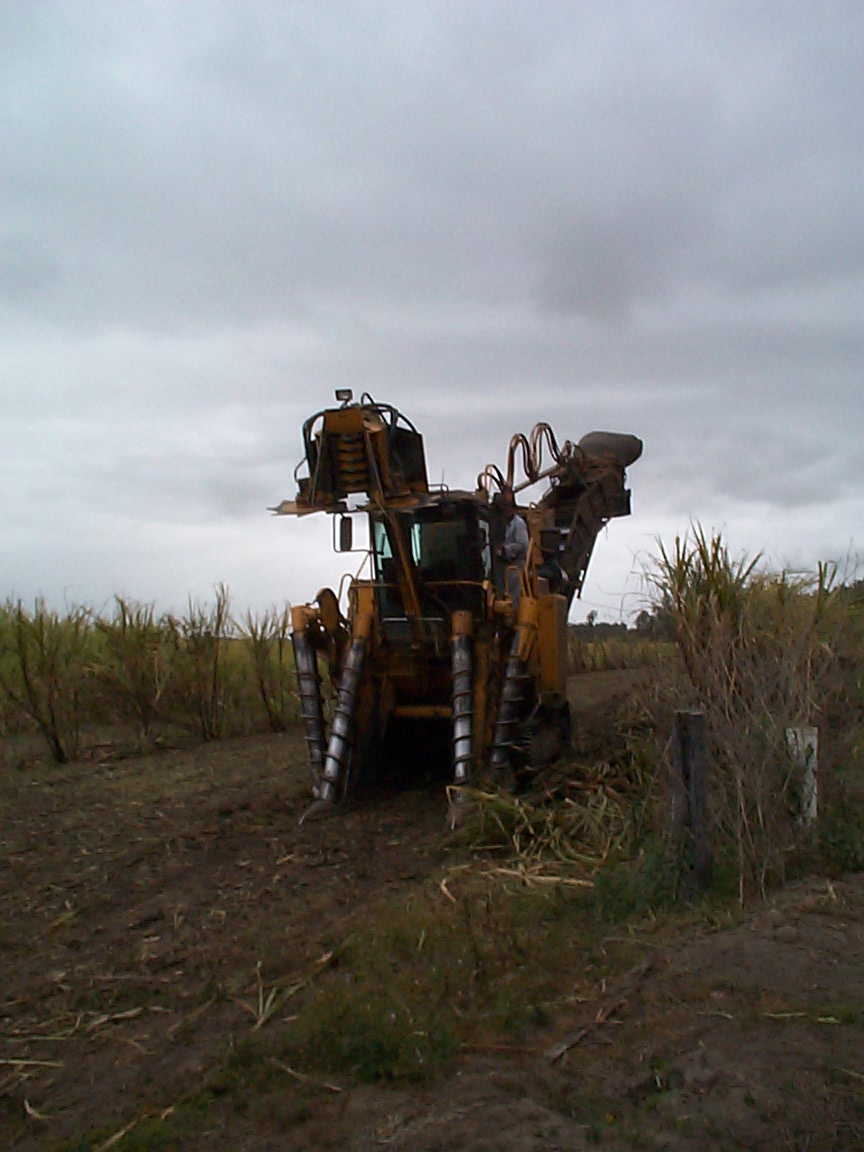
A stationary harvester, 2007

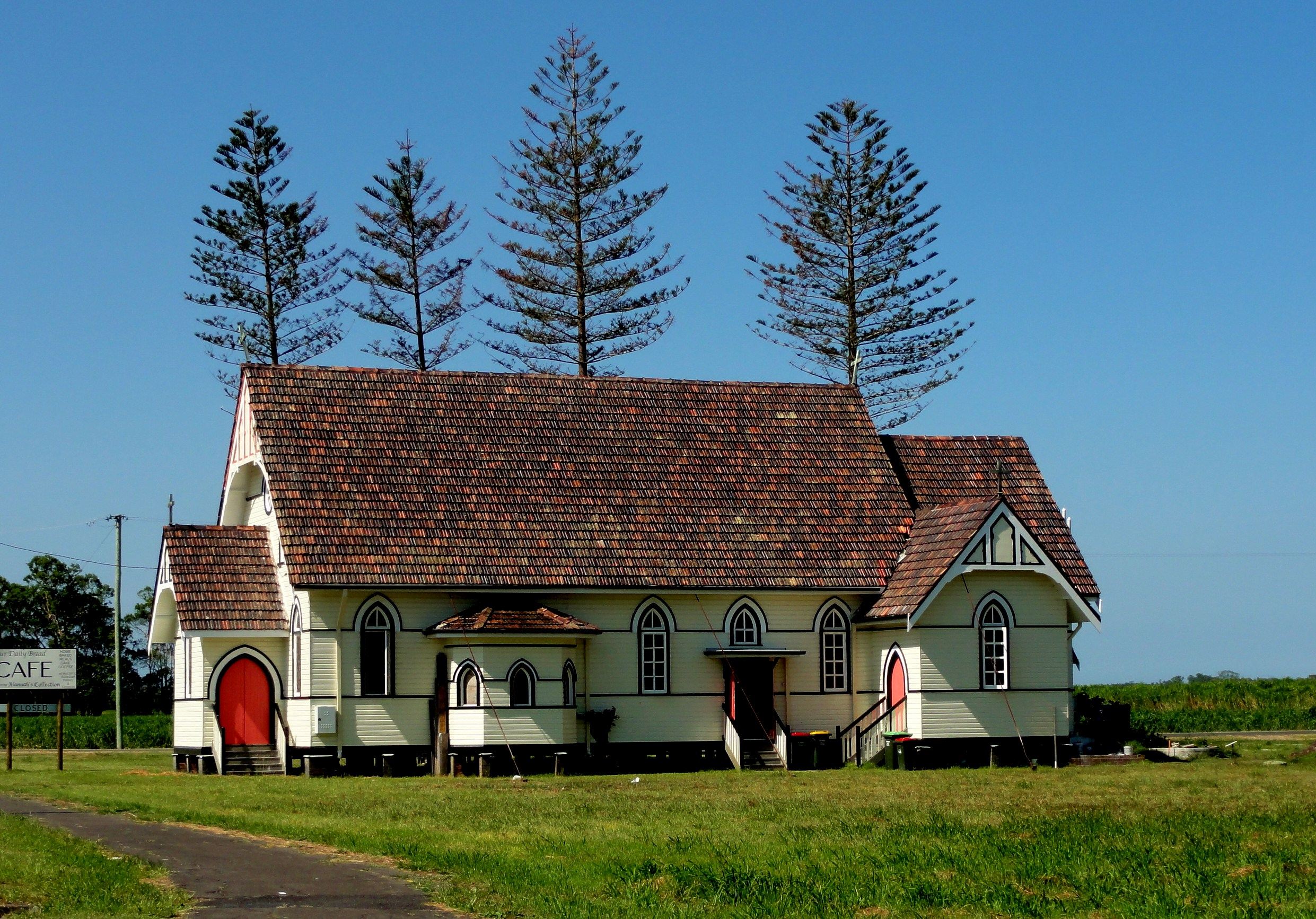
A wooden church in Broadwater, 2013
