= Richmond Range National Park =

National park in Australia

- IUCN category II (national park)
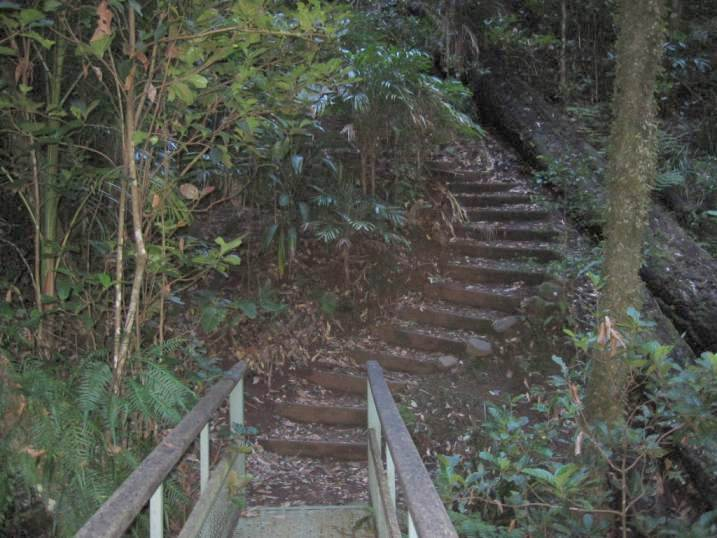
- Bridge across Culmaran Creek

- Location within New South Wales
- Location: New South Wales
- Coordinates: 28°35′44″S 152°42′51″E
- Area: 154 km^{2} (59 sq mi)
- Established: 1997
- Governing body: NSW National Parks & Wildlife Service
- Website: Official website

Richmond Range is a national park located in New South Wales, Australia, 605 kilometres (376 mi) north of Sydney. It is located north of the Bruxner Highway in the southern portion of the Richmond Range mountains, part of the Great Dividing Range. The Park is co-managed by the Githabul People who have inhabited the region for thousands of years. It is home to Australia's World Heritage Area of Cambridge Plateau and Bungdoozle area rainforests. It consists of various endangered species of animals such as the golden-tipped bat, Parma wallabies, spotted-tailed quoll and long-nosed potoroos.

The average winter temperature in the park is 15 °C, and the summer 25 °C.

== See also ==
- Protected areas of New South Wales
