= Coraki, New South Wales =

Coraki
- Town
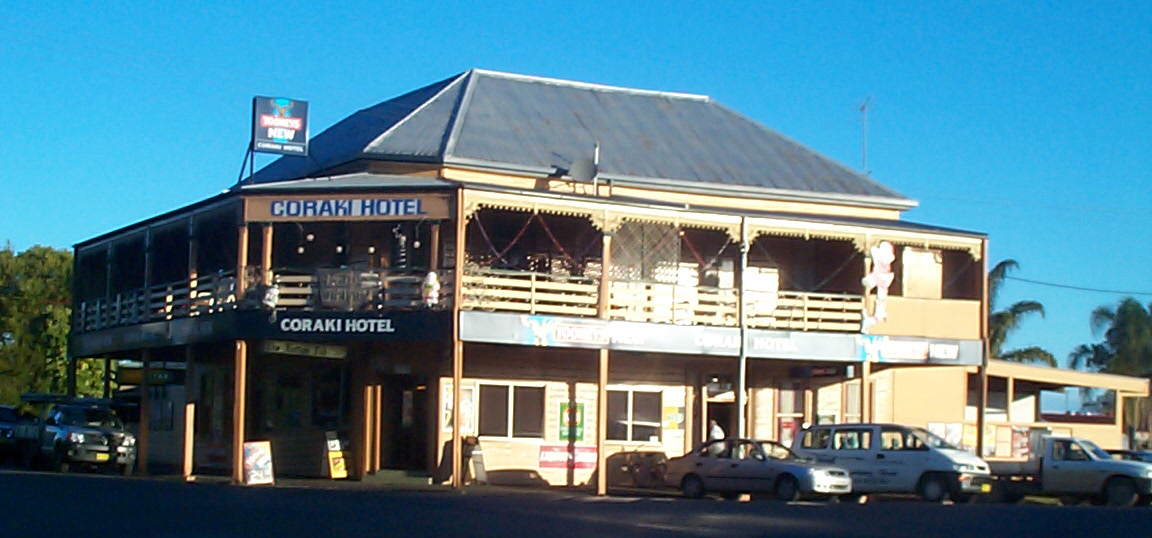
- The Coraki Hotel on Richmond Terrace, Coraki's main street

- Coordinates: 28°59′0″S 153°18′0″E
- Country: Australia
- State: New South Wales
- LGA: Richmond Valley Council
- Established: 1849

Government
  - State electorate: Clarence
  - Federal division: Page

Population
  - Total: 1,155 (2021 census)
- Postcode: 2471

Coraki is a small town that sits on the confluence of the Richmond and Wilsons Rivers in northeastern New South Wales, Australia in Richmond Valley Shire. At the 2021 census, Coraki had a population of 1,155.

The Bundjalung people are the traditional owners of the area.

== History ==
The name Coraki comes from the Bundjalung language with a number of different origins being supposed including gurigay meaning 'the meeting of the water', coraki meaning a 'plain or forest turkey' (likely bush turkey) or the contraction of an Aboriginal mans name Horraki (this has also been recorded as Koriki, Kurrachie, Kurrachee or Guriga).

The village was founded by William Yabsley in 1849 when Lismore was only a small cattle station and Casino had only one store and a hotel. Yabsley and his family obtained the lease to Brook Station and established the first permanent settlement. He built his shipyard just above The Junction, as it was first called. Many ships and river boats were launched there and Yabsley opened a store for provisions for the cedar cutters who came to the district. Transport at the time was almost entirely by water and Coraki was the busiest port on the Richmond River.

== Description ==
Coraki is positioned centrally to the hub of the Summerland Way Casino (30 km (19 mi) west), the regional city of Lismore (25 km (16 mi) north) and the popular tourist beachside location of Evans Head (25 km (16 mi) east). At the western boundary of Coraki township lies Box Ridge, an Aboriginal community.

Like many other towns in the area, it is a hub for the local agricultural industries such as cattle, sugar cane and tea tree oil.

Coraki is a small village with many community facilities: Coraki Fire Station, Coraki Public School, St Joseph's Primary School, St Joseph's Church, Coraki Uniting Church, Coraki Anglican Church, Coraki Community Hall, the Rural Transaction Centre, Mid-Richmond Museum, Coraki Library, post office, Mid-Richmond Retirement Village, cemetery, hockey fields, tennis courts, skate park, boat ramp, and the Memorial Park with barbecue, playground and picnic facilities aligning the "healing stones" riverside path. There is a number of local businesses, including the historic Coraki Hotel on Richmond Terrace.

== Events ==
Coraki is the home of the annual Coraki Art Prize (formerly the Coraki Tea Tree Art Prize) and an art competition and exhibition open to all artists and including painting, drawing, photography, sculpture and printmaking, held late October.

In 2010, the first Dylanfest celebrated the music, art and poetry of Bob Dylan in October at the Coraki Hotel.

Annually in November, the Tweed Water Skiing Club converges on the Richmond River to contest the "Coraki Assault" race.

== Population ==
Historical population
Year	Pop.	±%
1976	912	—
1981	895	−1.9%
1986	1,047	+17.0%
1991	1,103	+5.3%
1996	1,223	+10.9%
2001	1,155	−5.6%
2006	1,180	+2.2%
2011	1,215	+3.0%
2016	1,094	−10.0%
2021	1,155	+5.6%
Source: Australian Bureau of Statistics data.

According to the 2021 Census, there were 1,155 people in Coraki, with the following demographic features:

- Aboriginal and Torres Strait Islander people made up 10.6% of the population.
- 80.0% of people were born in Australia and 84.0% of people spoke only English at home.
- The most common responses for religion were No Religion 32.6%, Catholic 22.9% and Anglican 15.2%.

== Native title ==
In late April 2021, the Federal Court of Australia convened at Evans Head, where a native title determination was made over 7.2 square kilometres (2.8 sq mi) of land, consisting of 52 separate areas of land. Included in the land is a bora ring of great cultural significance to the Bundjalung people, near Coraki.

== Gallery ==
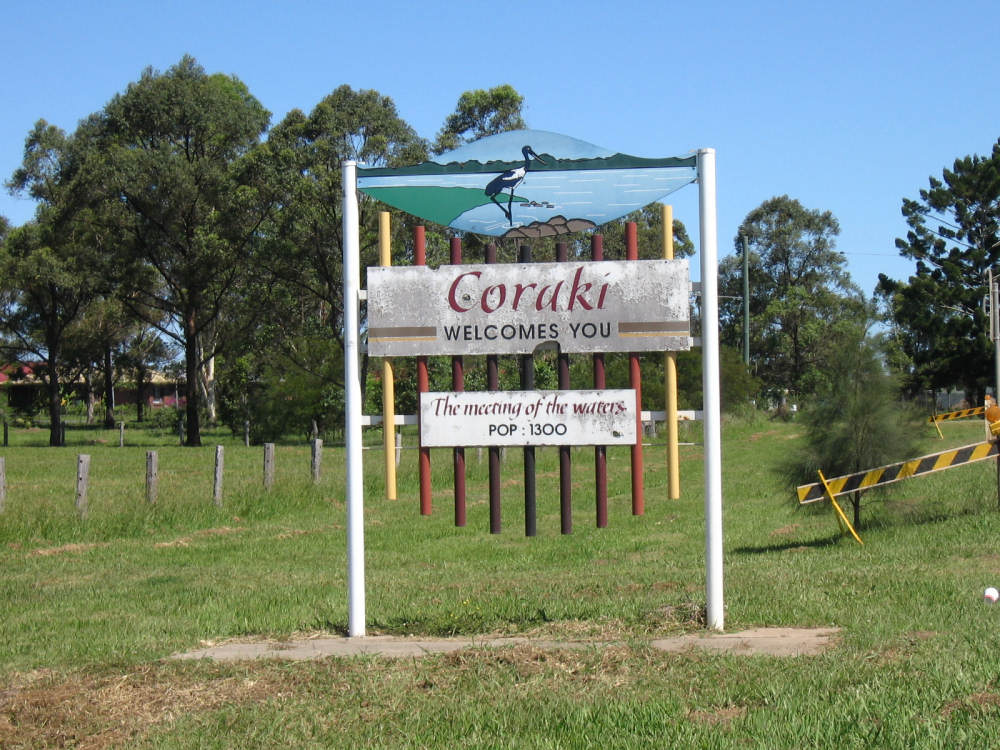
Welcome sign on the outskirts of Coraki

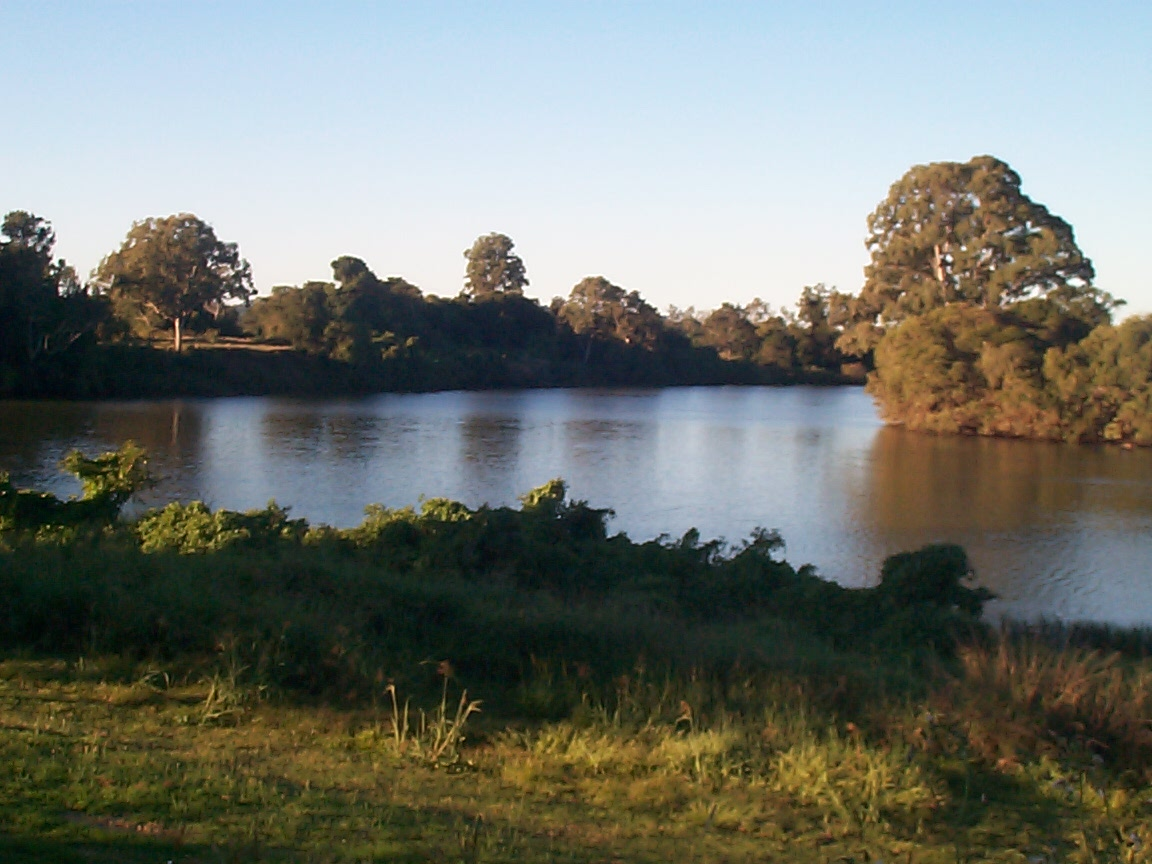
Junction of the Richmond and Wilson rivers at Coraki

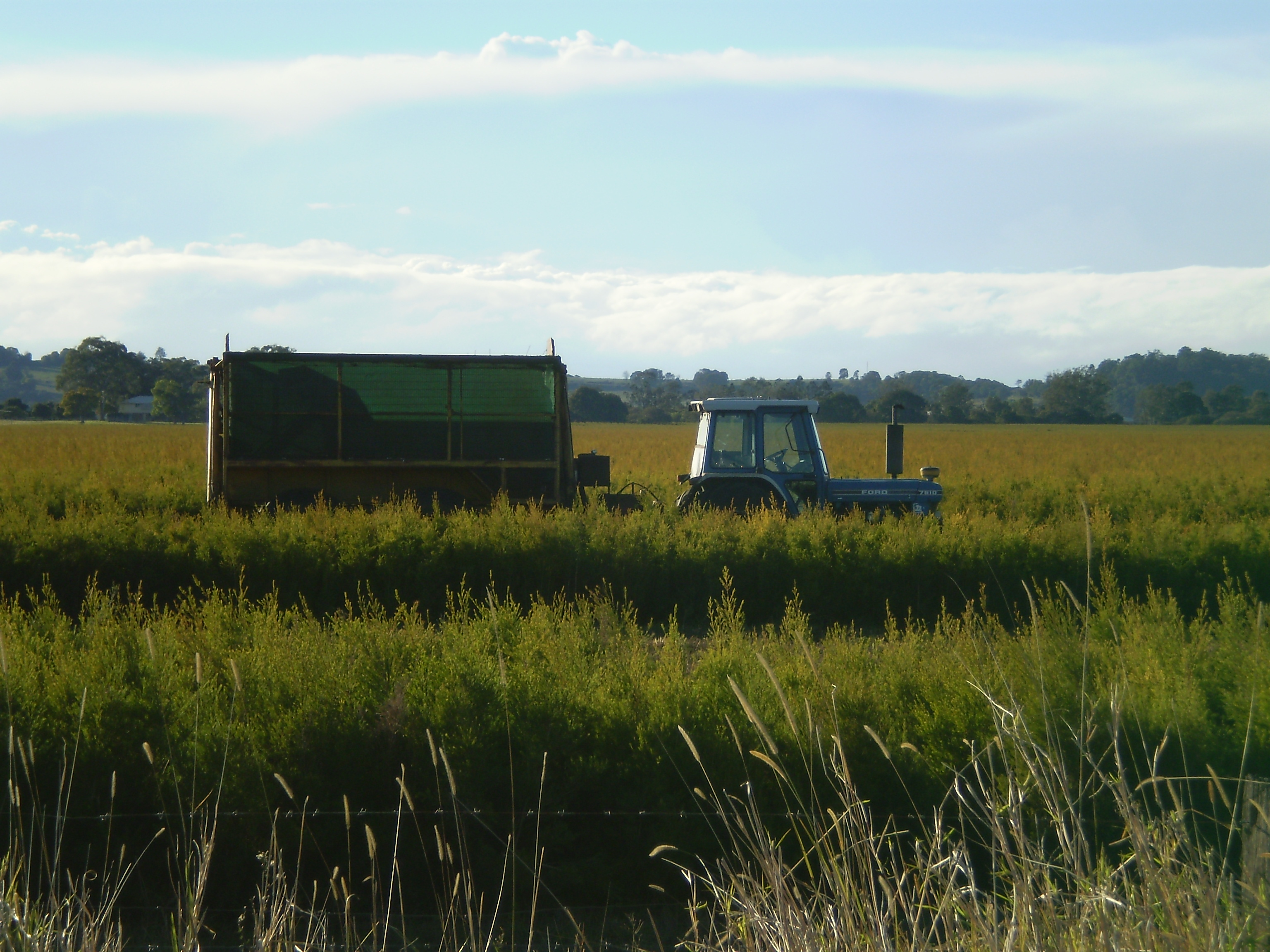
Tea tree plantation near Coraki

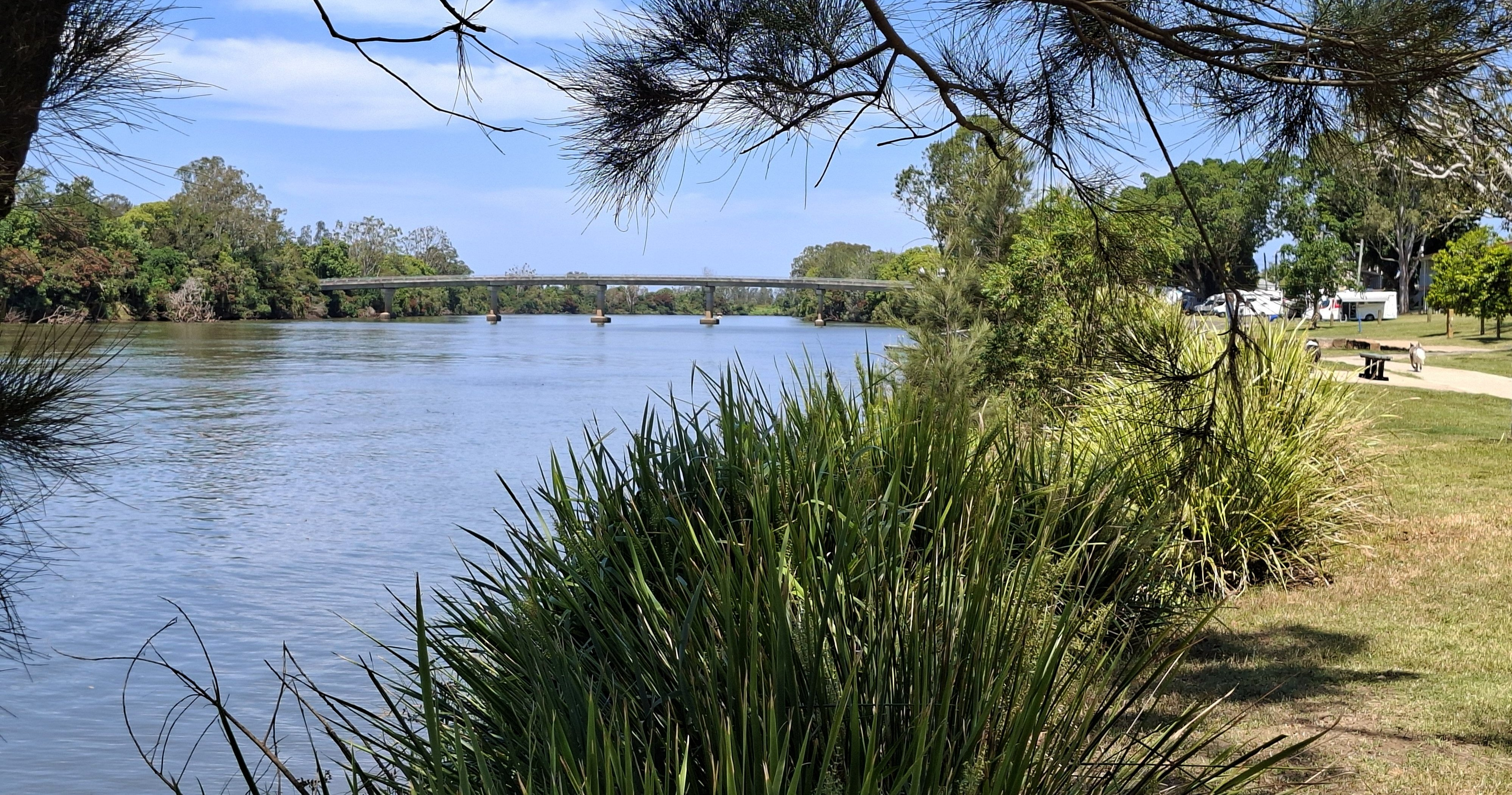
Richmond River at Coraki

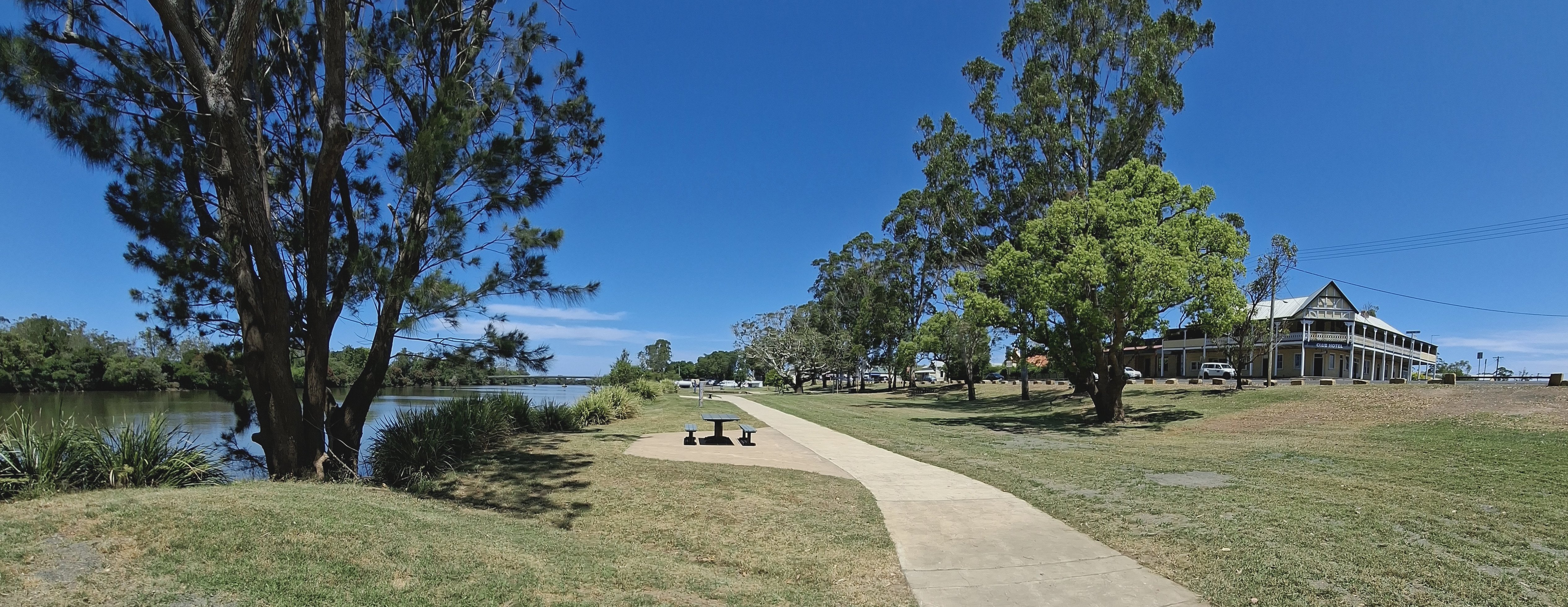
Richmond River with riverside park at Coraki

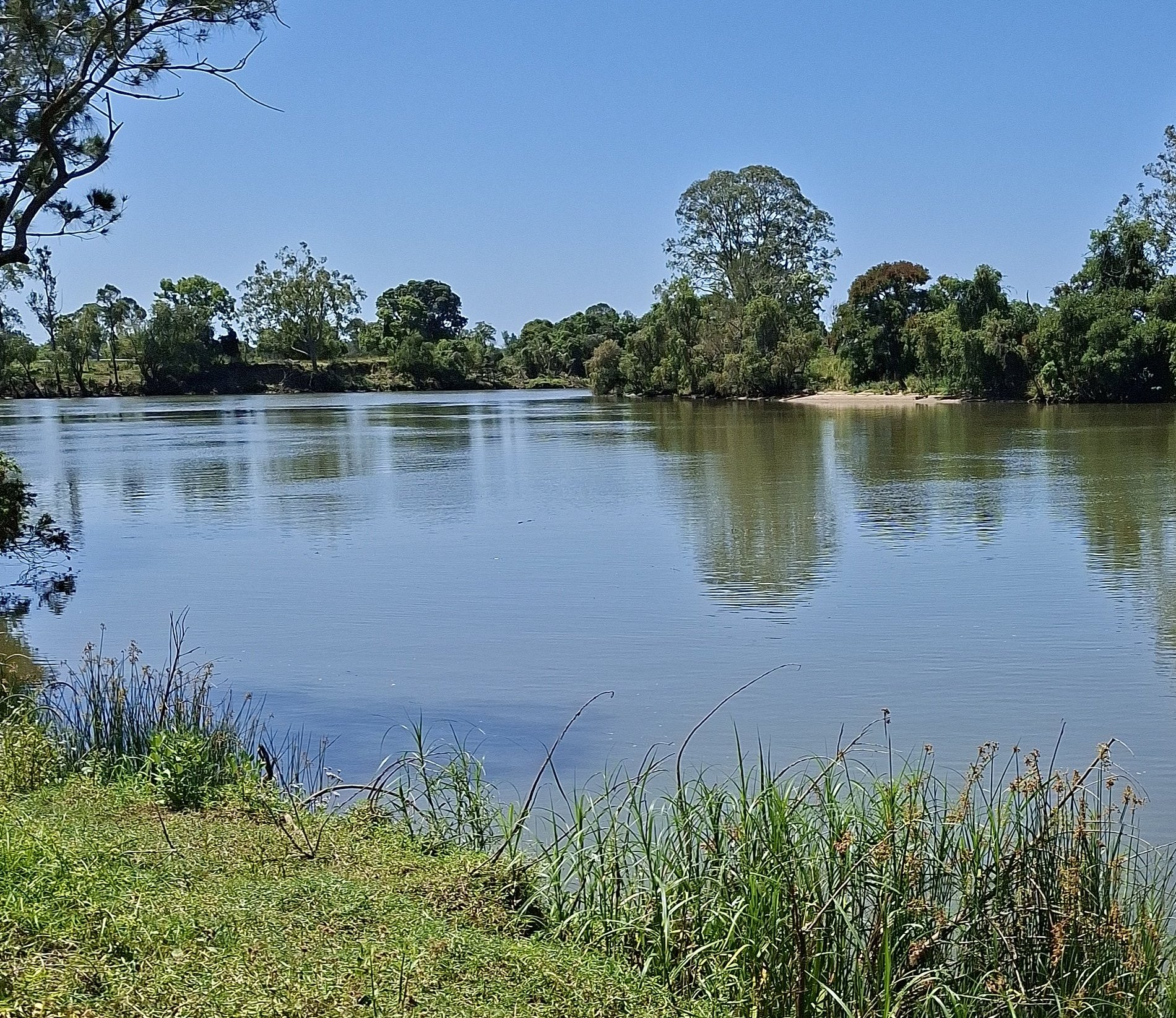
Richmond River-Wilsons River junction at Coraki (re-photographed 2025)

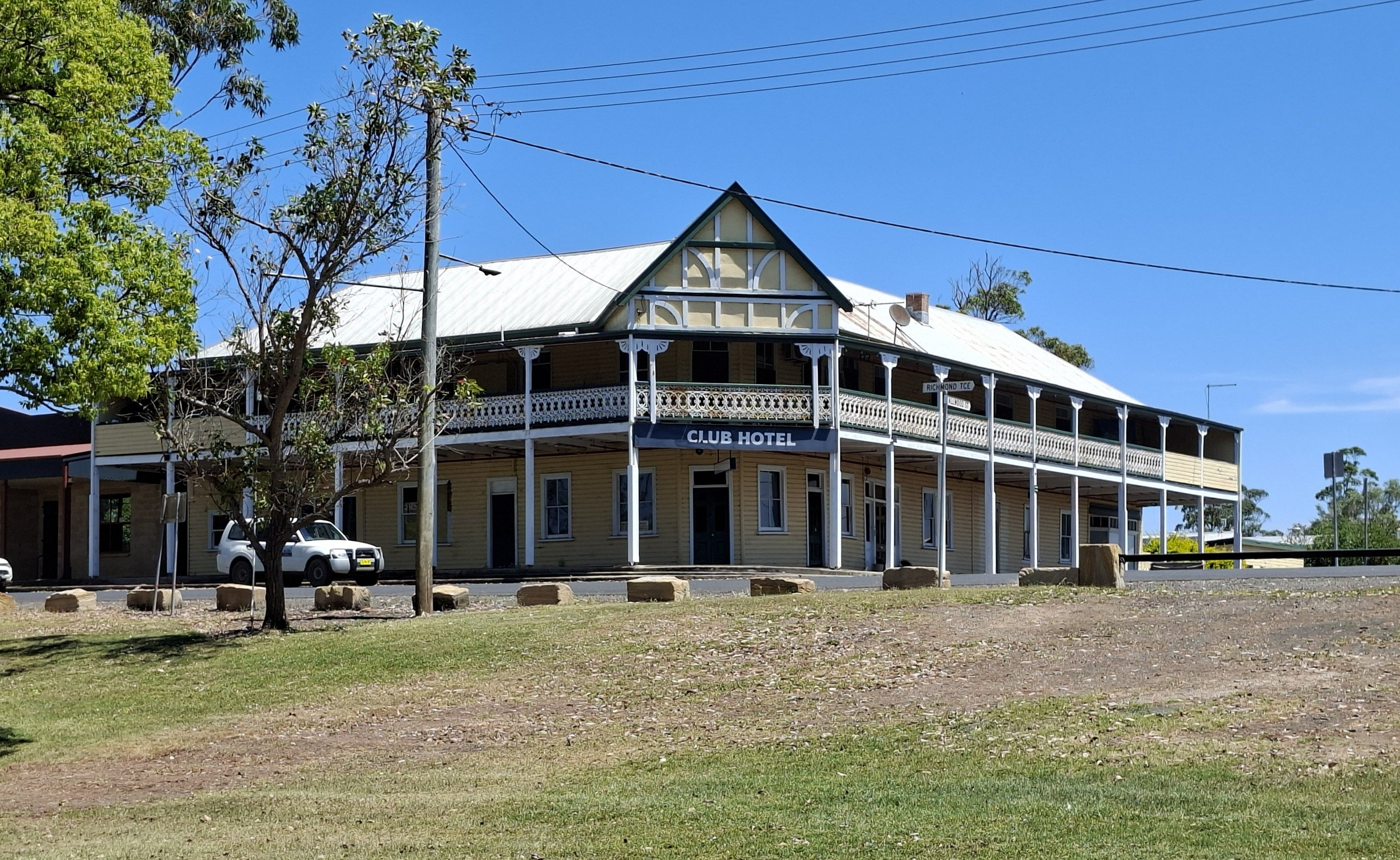
The Club Hotel at Coraki
