= Stratheden, New South Wales =

Coordinates: 28°45′55″S 152°56′05″E

Stratheden is a locality in the Richmond Valley, New South Wales, Australia. It is west of the Richmond River, approximately midway between Casino and Kyogle.
