= Richmond River =

River in New South Wales, Australia

Richmond
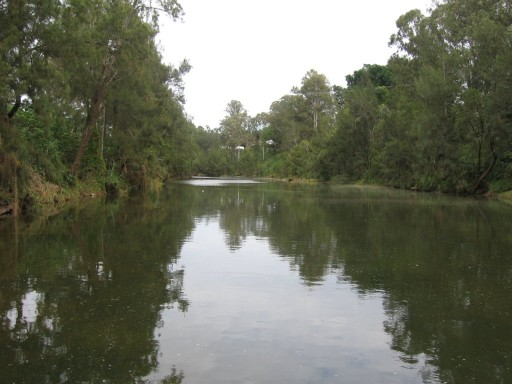
- The Richmond River at Casino, 2006.

- Location of the Richmond River mouth in New South Wales
- Etymology: Charles, the fifth Duke of Richmond

Location
- Country: Australia
- State: New South Wales
- Region: NSW North Coast (IBRA), Northern Rivers
- Local government areas: Kyogle, Richmond Valley, Ballina

Physical characteristics
- Source: McPherson Range
  - location: west of Mount Lindesay, near Woodenbong
  - coordinates: 28°19′48″S 152°40′30″E
  - elevation: 236 m (774 ft)
- Mouth: Coral Sea, South Pacific Ocean
  - location: near Ballina / South Ballina
  - coordinates: 28°52′36″S 153°35′29″E
  - elevation: 0 m (0 ft)
- Length: 394 km (245 mi)
- Basin size: 6,862 km^{2} (2,649 sq mi)
- Discharge
  - location: Near mouth
  - average: 68.4 m^{3}/s (2,160 GL/a)

Basin features
- Tributaries
  - left: Findon Creek, Gradys Creek, Lynchs Creek, Fawcetts Creek, Wilsons River, Emigrant Creek
  - right: Back Creek, Roseberry Creek, Horse Station Creek, Eden Creek, Bungawalbin Creek, Shannon Brook
- National parks: Border Ranges NP, Richmond Range NP

The Richmond River is a river in the Northern Rivers region of New South Wales, Australia.

== Course and features ==
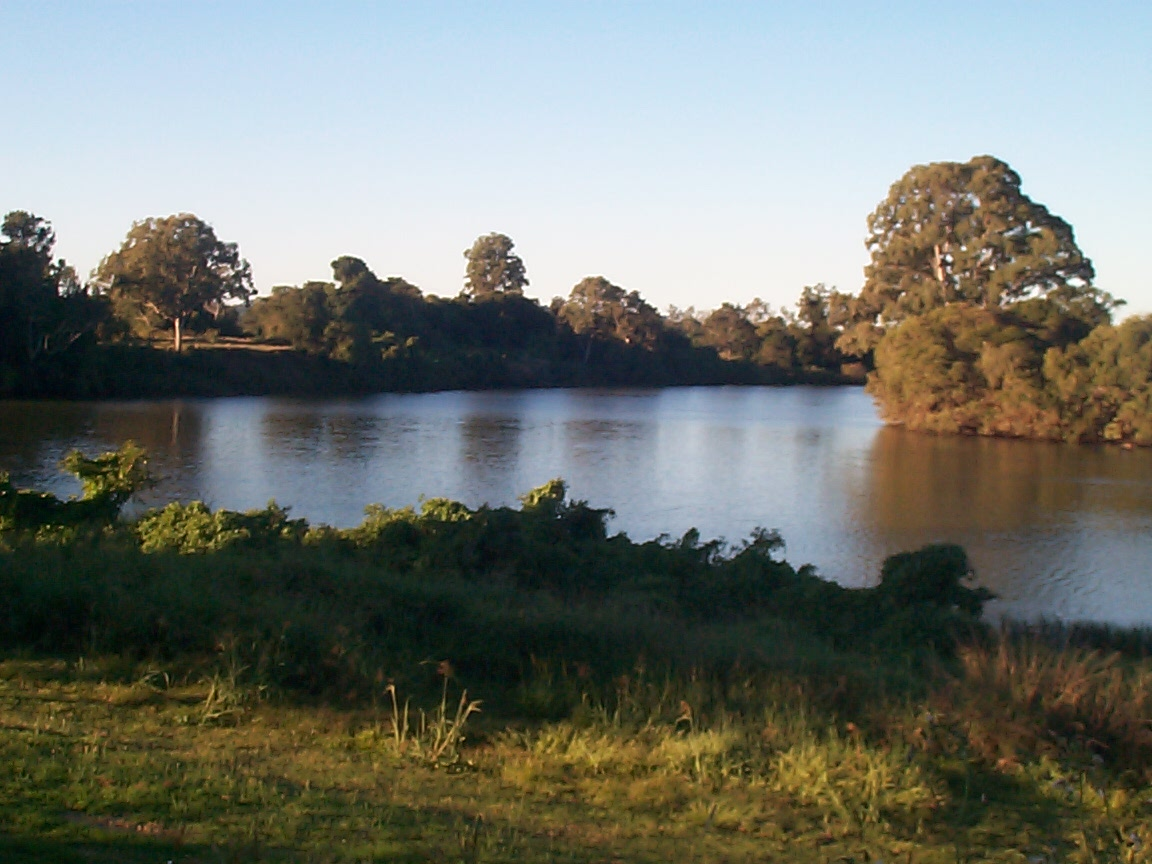
Junction of the Richmond and Wilson rivers at Coraki, 2007

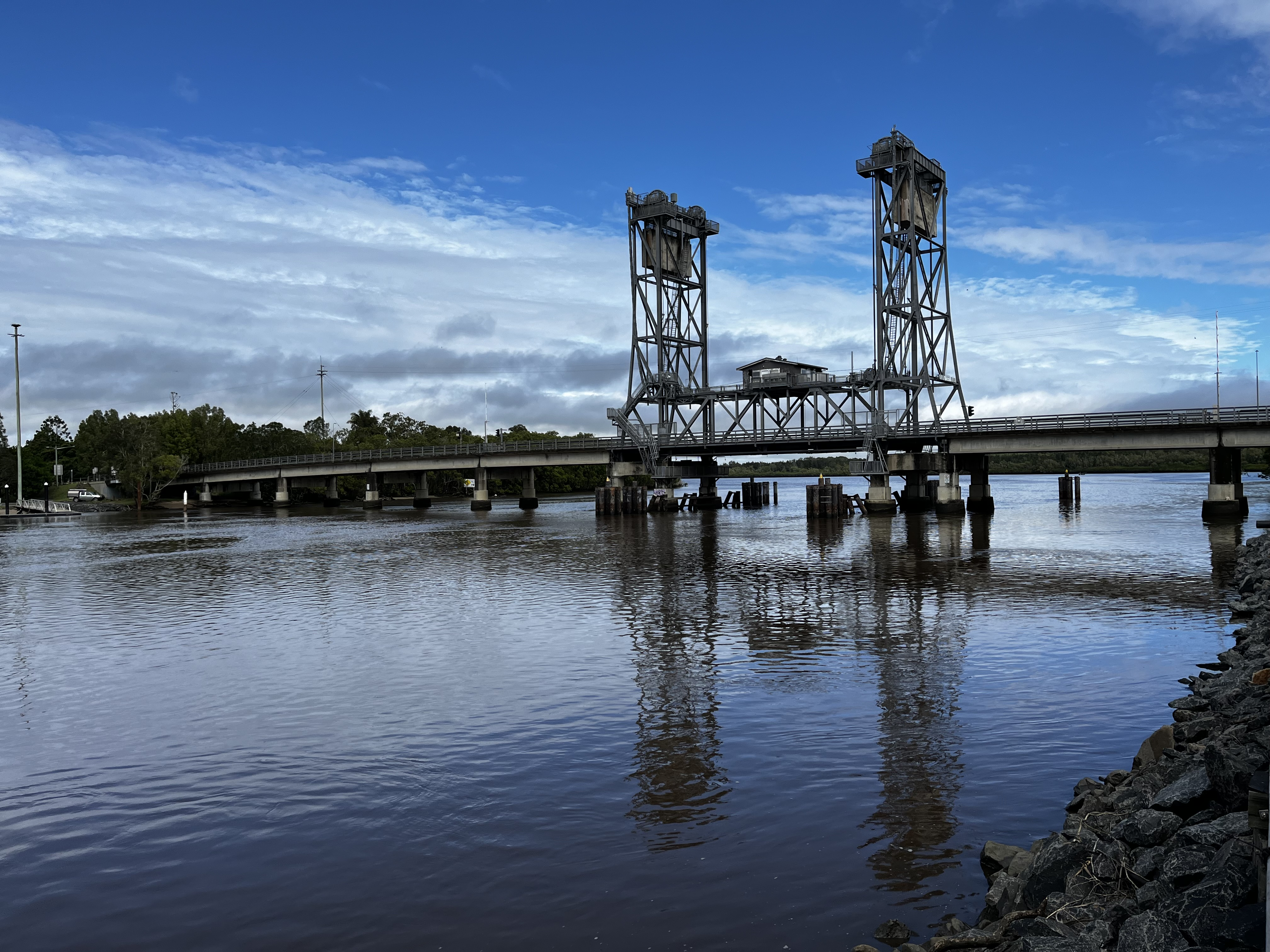
The lift span bridge in Wardell, NSW, which crosses the Richmond River

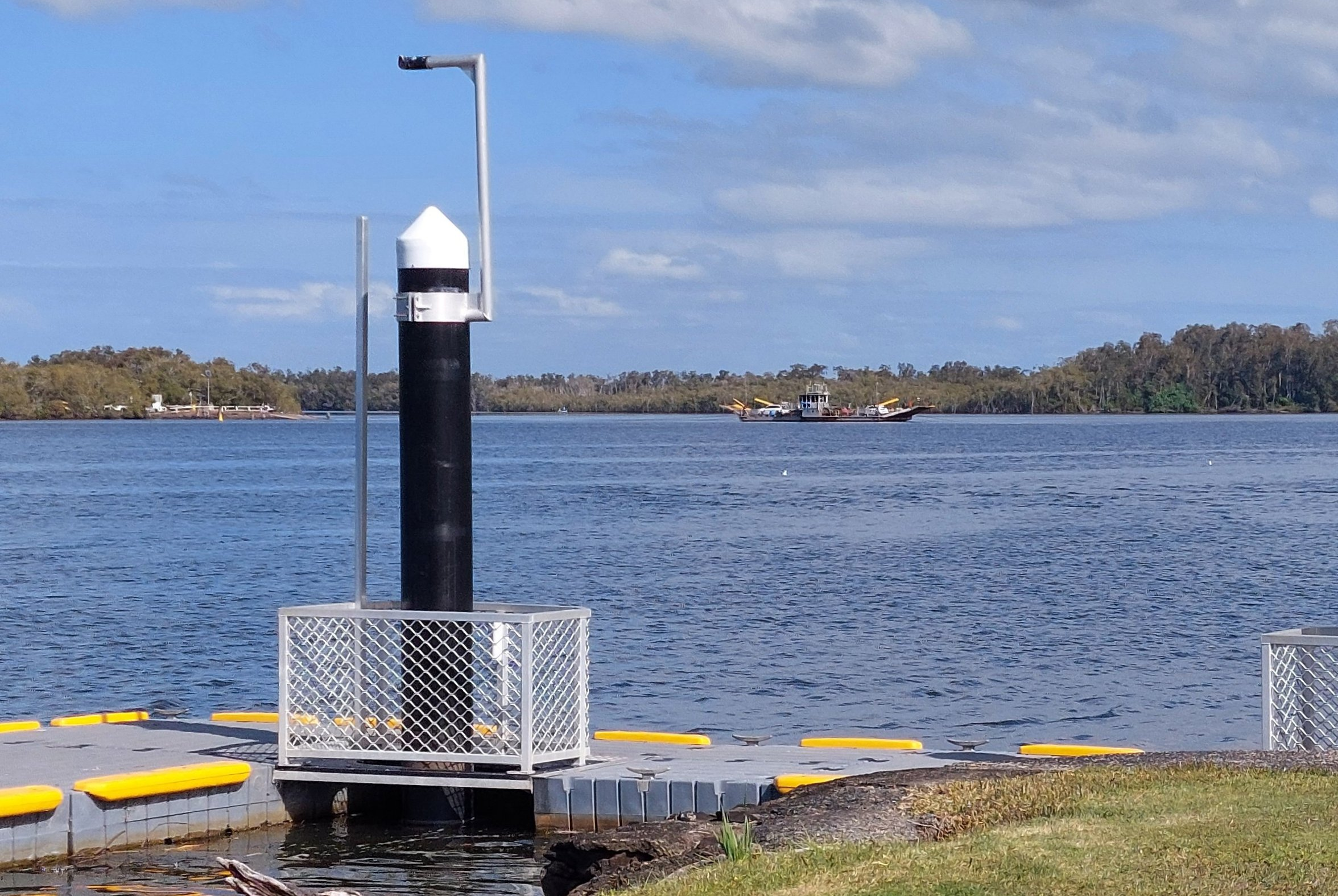
Richmond River at Ballina, with the Burns Point Ferry in the middle distance crossing from the West to South Ballina river banks, July 2025

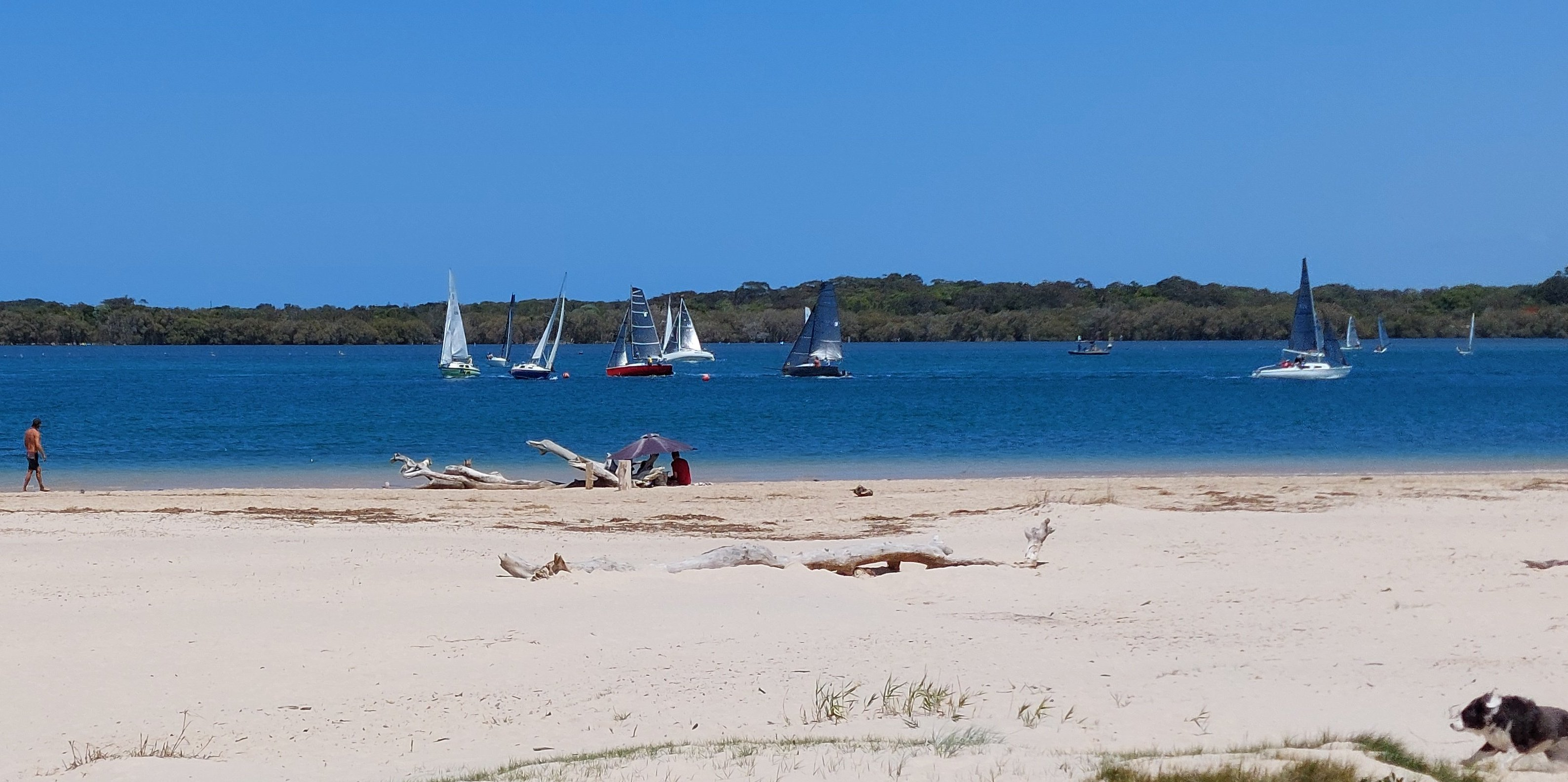
Yacht racing on the Richmond River at Ballina, October 2023

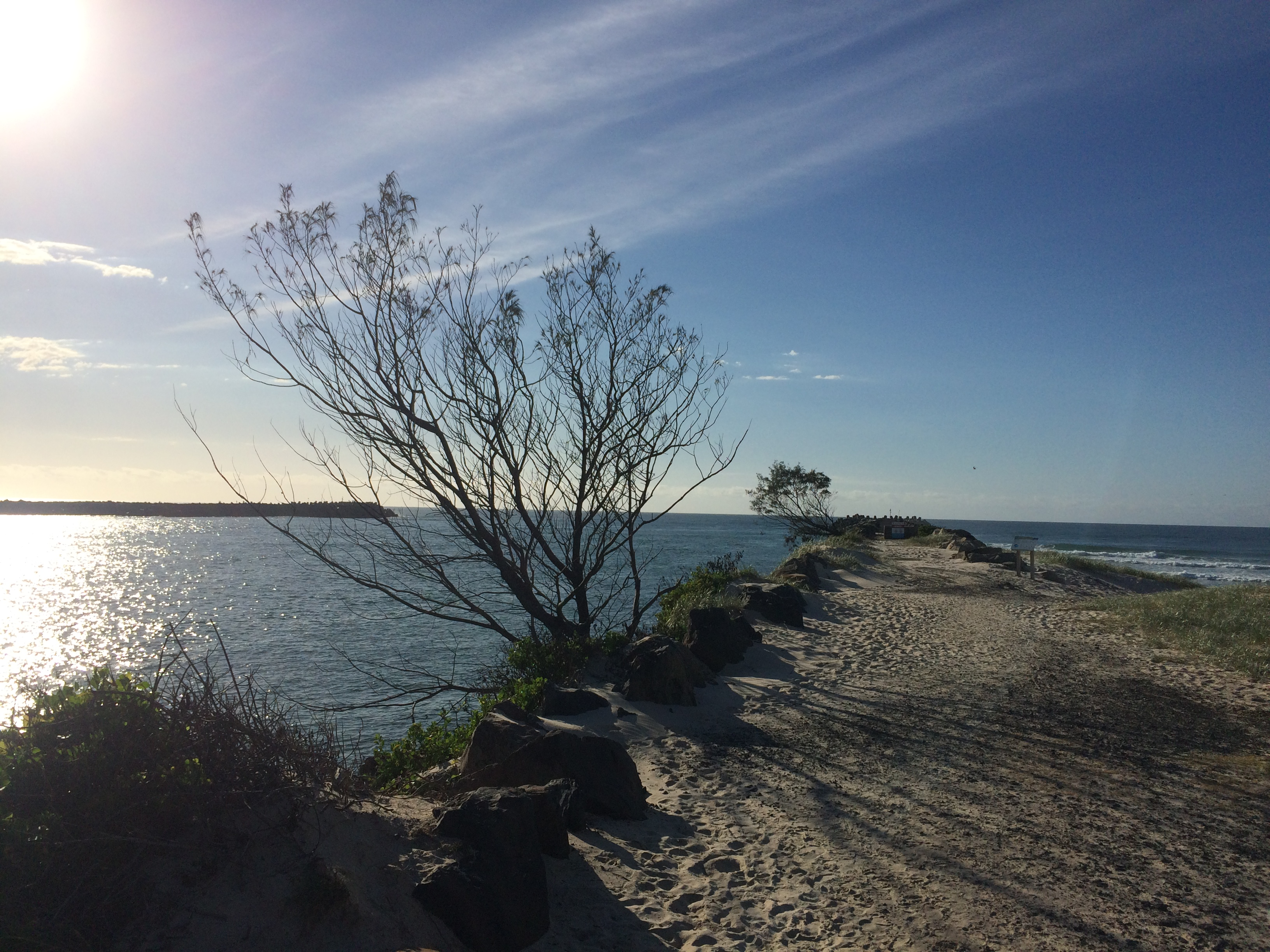
The Richmond River entrance from the Southern Breakwater, April 2019.

The river rises at the northern end of the Richmond Range, near its junction with the McPherson Range, on the Queensland/ New South Wales border, west of Mount Lindesay, and flows generally south east and north east, joined by twelve tributaries, including the Wilsons River, before reaching its mouth at its confluence with the Coral Sea of the South Pacific Ocean at Ballina, descending 256 metres (840 ft) over its 237 kilometres (147 mi) course.

On its journey it passes through the towns of Kyogle, Casino, Coraki and Woodburn. Summerland Way is situated adjacent to much of the middle reaches of the course of Richmond River. The Pacific Highway crosses the river near Broadwater. The lowest permanent vehicular crossing (closest to the river mouth) is the lift-section bridge at Wardell, while closer to Ballina, the Burns Point Ferry provides an additional manually operated, daytime vehicle and passenger crossing service, operating between the shores of South and West Ballina. Upstream from Wardell, the next regular (non motorway) road crossings are provided by road bridges at Broadwater (Broadwater Bridge), Woodburn and Coraki.

There are several small islands in the river as it approaches the sea, named instances being Pelican Island near Broadwater, Goat Island and Cabbage Tree Island south of Wardell, and Pimlico Island (plus Little Pimlico Island) between Pimlico and Empire Vale. Of these, Cabbage Tree Island is inhabited, having an Aboriginal community and a school (although the community was relocated from the Island following damage to their properties during the 2022 eastern Australia floods), while Little Pimlico Island is a nature reserve. The final approximately 7km of the southern bank of the river, between Burns Point and the entry to the ocean, is also a nature reserve, the Richmond River Nature Reserve which covers an area of 256ha, and also extends south from the river mouth for some distance along South Ballina Beach.

The catchment area of the river is estimated at 6,862 square kilometres (2,649 sq mi), which makes it the sixth largest catchment in New South Wales; and its floodplain has an area of over 1,000 square kilometres (390 sq mi).

== History ==
=== Aboriginal history ===
The traditional custodians of the land surrounding the Richmond River are the Aboriginal people of the Githabul, whose territory reached north to the current city of Toowoomba and included the current towns of Tenterfield and Warwick. One of the annual rituals of the Githabul people was the movement from the mountain ranges to the coast during the winter months, when the mullet were plentiful. The inland peoples from around brought black bean seeds with them to trade for the fish.

=== European history ===
Omitted by Captain James Cook when he sailed up the east coast of the Australian mainland in 1770, it wasn't until Captain Henry John Rous identified the mouth of the river in 1828 that it was discovered by Europeans. Rous entered the river and sailed about 20 miles (32 km) up river. He subsequently named the river Richmond after the fifth Duke of Richmond. Later that year the explorer Allan Cunningham reached the river by land.

The river was a major transportation route from the 1840s until well into the 20th century. Soon after the first white settlers arrived they discovered the abundant supply of Australian red cedar in the Richmond Valley and immediately began logging. The river was vital in the transportation of this resource.

At the time of its discovery in 1828 and until the late 1890s the river had a treacherous mouth of shifting sand bars, and many ships and people died on it. Understandably, a decision was made to construct two breakwaters to channel the river's flow and these were completed in the early 1900s. The construction of the breakwaters also led to the formation of Shaw's Bay (after sand built up behind what is now called Lighthouse or Main Beach).

In 1846, a conflict between white settlers and local Aboriginal people in the river valley (the Richmond River massacre) caused the deaths of around 100 of the latter.

With the decline of shipping as a transport mode, owing to better roads and rail, and the closing of the North Coast Steam Navigation Company (the major shipping firm of the area) in 1954, the river became less important as a transportation route.

Originally, the arm of the river running through Lismore was known as the North Arm of the Richmond (hence, Lismore was also considered to lie on the Richmond River). In 1976 its name was changed to the Wilsons River, the name change reflecting that of the European owners of the original land holding that later became the City of Lismore.

== Current usage ==
For boats, the river is navigable for a short way up its length, possibly as far as Casino. Wilsons River, which flows through the city of Lismore and is a major tributary of the Richmond, is navigable at least as far as Boatharbour, approximately 12 kilometres (7.5 mi) upstream from Lismore.

The Richmond River is heavily used for irrigation along its length. Several weirs have been constructed in order to mitigate the effects of flooding, most notably at Casino.

Near its entrance to the Pacific Ocean, the sheltered estuary of the river provides several sandy beaches and opportunities for recreational activities including swimming, sun bathing, yachting, fishing and dog walking. It is also home to the Richmond River Sailing & Rowing Club, and provides access to the Ballina trawler harbour which is situated just off the river estuary, where the river is joined by Fishery Creek. One small area of residential canal estate development, the Ballina Quays, extends the available river frontage for housing so that each can then have individual moorings as desired, set back from the remainder of the river frontage.

== Fauna ==
The freshwater reaches of the Richmond River once supported the endemic Richmond River cod, similar to Murray cod and possibly a subspecies of eastern freshwater cod. However this native fish became extinct between the 1930s and 1950s due to habitat degradation and gross overfishing, including with dynamite during the building of the local railway line. The endangered Oxleyan pygmy perch has been recorded from the river.

== See also ==
- Rivers of New South Wales
- List of rivers of Australia
- Border Ranges National Park
- Richmond Range National Park
