= Broadwater National Park =

National park in New South Wales, Australia

- IUCN category II (national park)
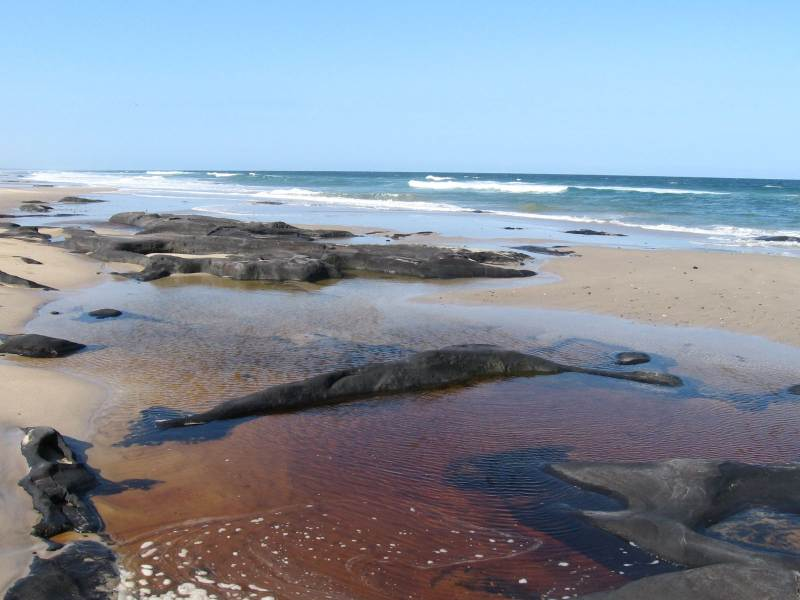
- Coffee Rocks at Broadwater National Park, named for the coloured material they leach into the water

- Location within New South Wales
- Location: New South Wales
- Coordinates: 29°03′14″S 153°24′36″E
- Area: 421 km^{2} (163 sq mi)
- Established: 1974
- Governing body: NSW National Parks & Wildlife Service
- Website: http://www.nationalparks.nsw.gov.au

Broadwater is a national park in New South Wales, Australia, 577 km northeast of Sydney.

A wide range of various vegetation, coastal rainforests, swamps, open eucalyptus forests are a great refuge for many species of migratory birds.

Broadwater is a great place for a family trip, especially for bird watchers.

== See also ==
- Protected areas of New South Wales
