= Drake County =

Drake New South Wales
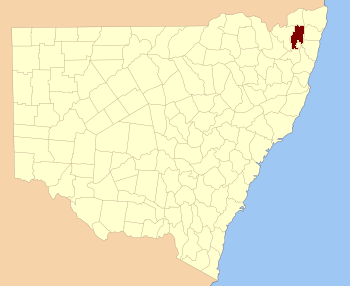
- Location in New South Wales
Lands administrative divisions around Drake:
Buller	Buller	Rous
Clive	Drake	Richmond
Gough	Gresham	Clarence

Drake County is one of the 141 cadastral divisions of New South Wales.

Drake County was named in honour of Sir Francis Drake (1540–1596). It is located to the north of parts of the Clarence River, Nymboida River and Mann River. It includes the Washpool National Park.

== Parishes within this county ==
A full list of parishes found within this county; their current LGA and mapping coordinates to the approximate centre of each location is as follows:

Parish	LGA	Coordinates
Albert	Glen Innes Severn Council	29°23′54″S 152°21′04″E
Alice	Clarence Valley Council	29°02′54″S 152°38′04″E
Black Camp	Kyogle Council	28°48′54″S 152°43′04″E
Cangai	Clarence Valley Council	29°36′54″S 152°30′04″E
Carnham	Clarence Valley Council	29°16′54″S 152°30′04″E
Chauvel	Tenterfield Shire Council	28°55′54″S 152°32′04″E
Churchill	Clarence Valley Council	29°10′54″S 152°30′04″E
Coombadjha	Clarence Valley Council	29°22′54″S 152°28′04″E
Coongbar	Clarence Valley Council	29°04′54″S 152°42′04″E
Cooraldooral	Glen Innes Severn Council	29°34′54″S 152°16′04″E
Dandahra	Clarence Valley Council	29°29′54″S 152°26′04″E
Drake	Tenterfield Shire Council	29°00′54″S 152°25′04″E
Dunbar	Tenterfield Shire Council	28°57′54″S 152°31′04″E
Ewingar	Clarence Valley Council	29°05′54″S 152°30′04″E
Fairfield	Tenterfield Shire Council	28°54′54″S 152°27′04″E
Hamilton	Tenterfield Shire Council	29°01′54″S 152°30′04″E
Hassan	Clarence Valley Council	29°20′54″S 152°45′04″E
Hongkong	Tenterfield Shire Council	29°06′54″S 152°24′04″E
Keybarbin	Clarence Valley Council	29°06′54″S 152°38′04″E
Malara	Tenterfield Shire Council	29°12′54″S 152°22′04″E
Mookima	Clarence Valley Council	29°14′54″S 152°43′04″E
Neville	Clarence Valley Council	29°15′54″S 152°46′04″E
Ogilvie	Clarence Valley Council	29°11′54″S 152°38′04″E
Picarbin	Kyogle Council	28°57′54″S 152°36′04″E
Pikapene	Kyogle Council	28°58′54″S 152°42′04″E
Plevna	Clarence Valley Council	29°17′54″S 152°22′04″E
Pucka	Clarence Valley Council	29°20′54″S 152°35′04″E
Puhoi	Clarence Valley Council	29°35′54″S 152°24′04″E
Pulganbar	Clarence Valley Council	29°26′54″S 152°41′04″E
Richmond	Glen Innes Severn Council	29°29′54″S 152°21′04″E
Rodgers	Glen Innes Severn Council	29°38′54″S 152°14′04″E
Rodham	Clarence Valley Council	29°09′54″S 152°43′04″E
Sandilands	Kyogle Council	28°54′54″S 152°42′04″E
Sistova	Tenterfield Shire Council	29°13′54″S 152°16′04″E
Tabulam	Kyogle Council	28°52′54″S 152°37′04″E
Timbarra	Tenterfield Shire Council	28°52′54″S 152°30′04″E
West Fairfield	Tenterfield Shire Council	28°55′54″S 152°22′04″E
Yarrcalkiarra	Clarence Valley Council	29°16′54″S 152°39′04″E
Yulgilbar	Clarence Valley Council	29°16′54″S 152°34′04″E
