= Severn Shire =

Former local government area in New South Wales, Australia

Severn Shire New South Wales
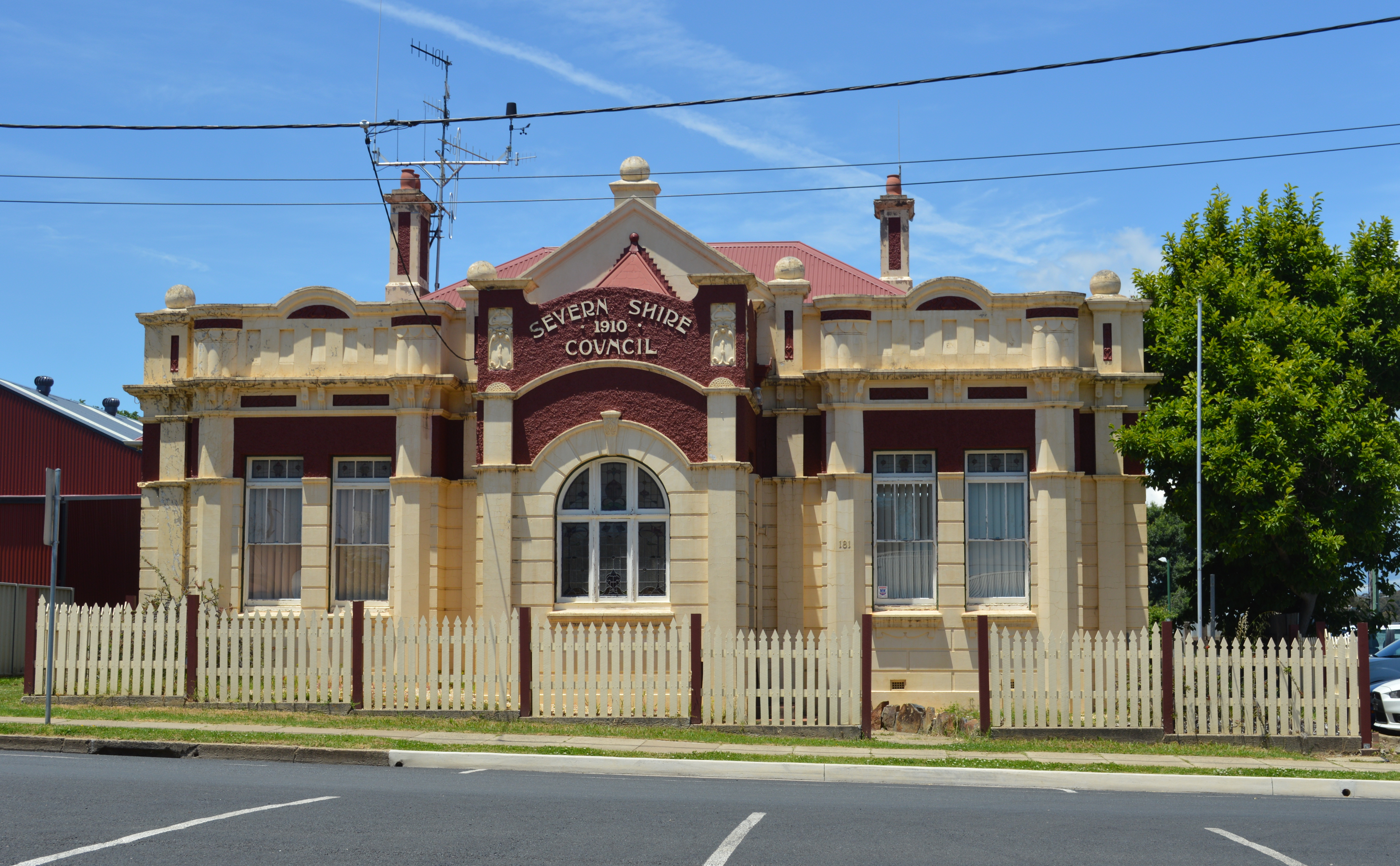
- The former Severn Shire chambers, 2017
- Established: 7 March 1906
- Abolished: 15 September 2004
- Council seat: Glen Innes
- Region: New England

Severn Shire was a local government area in the New England region of New South Wales, Australia.

Severn Shire was proclaimed on 7 March 1906, one of 134 shires created after the passing of the Local Government (Shires) Act 1905.

The shire office was in Glen Innes. Towns and villages in the shire included Deepwater, Dundee, Emmaville, Red Range, Stannum, Torrington and Wellingrove.

Severn Shire was abolished and split on 15 September 2004 with part of the shire was absorbed by Tenterfield Shire and the balance merged with Municipality of Glen Innes to form Glen Innes Severn Council.
