= Clive County, New South Wales =

Clive New South Wales
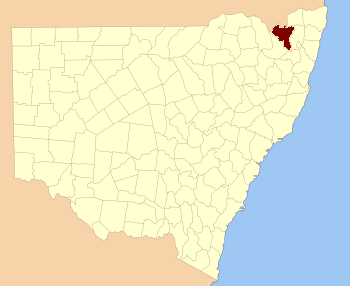
- Location in New South Wales
Lands administrative divisions around Clive:
Clive (Qld)	Bentinck (Qld)	Buller
Gough	Clive	Drake
Gough	Gresham	Gresham

Clive County is one of the 141 cadastral divisions of New South Wales.

The name is of unknown origin.

== Parishes ==
Clive County consists of the following parishes:

Parish	LGA	Coordinates	Towns
Addison	Tenterfield	29°05′54″S 151°55′04″E	
Angoperran	Tenterfield	29°21′54″S 151°56′04″E	
Annandale	Tenterfield	29°12′54″S 151°49′04″E	
Bajimba	Tenterfield	29°19′54″S 152°15′04″E	
Ballandean	Tenterfield	28°57′54″S 151°57′04″E	Jennings
Barney Downs	Tenterfield	28°59′54″S 152°07′04″E	Barney Downs
Bates	Tenterfield	29°12′54″S 151°44′04″E	
Binghi	Tenterfield	29°08′54″S 151°37′04″E	
Binny	Glen Innes Severn	29°30′54″S 152°14′04″E	
Blain	Tenterfield	29°10′54″S 151°28′04″E	
Bloxsome	Tenterfield	29°03′54″S 152°16′04″E	
Bluff Land	Tenterfield	29°09′54″S 152°03′04″E	Bungulla
Bolivia	Tenterfield	29°12′54″S 152°00′04″E	Bolivia
Booroo	Tenterfield	29°19′54″S 152°01′04″E	
Butterleaf	Glen Innes Severn	29°29′54″S 152°06′04″E	
Capoompeta	Glen Innes Severn	29°23′54″S 152°04′04″E	Capoompeta
Cavendish	Tenterfield	28°59′54″S 152°19′04″E	
Clifton	Tenterfield	29°03′54″S 151°50′04″E	Woodside
Cowper	Tenterfield	29°00′54″S 151°48′04″E	
Dickson	Tenterfield	29°04′54″S 152°09′04″E	
Donaldson	Tenterfield	29°01′54″S 151°39′04″E	
Dumaresq	Tenterfield	29°02′54″S 151°29′04″E	
Eastern Water	Glen Innes Severn	29°34′54″S 152°02′04″E	
Farnell	Glen Innes Severn	29°24′54″S 152°10′04″E	
Forest Land	Tenterfield	29°10′54″S 152°09′04″E	
Frazer	Tenterfield	29°10′54″S 151°49′04″E	
Garrett	Glen Innes Severn	29°33′54″S 152°06′04″E	
Gibraltar	Tenterfield	29°05′54″S 151°42′04″E	
Glen Elgin	Glen Innes Severn	29°35′54″S 152°08′04″E	Glen Elgin
Glen Lyon	Tenterfield	29°01′54″S 151°56′04″E	
Goolamanger	Tenterfield	29°16′54″S 152°10′04″E	
Graham	Tenterfield	28°59′54″S 151°58′04″E	
Harden	Tenterfield	28°55′54″S 151°38′04″E	
Hillcrest	Tenterfield	29°09′54″S 151°53′04″E	
Irby	Tenterfield	29°10′54″S 152°00′04″E	
Jeffrey	Tenterfield	28°56′54″S 151°40′04″E	
Jondol	Tenterfield	29°14′54″S 152°03′04″E	Sandy Flat
Lawson	Tenterfield	29°02′54″S 151°45′04″E	
Lewis	Glen Innes Severn	29°37′54″S 152°02′04″E	
Limestone	Tenterfield	29°00′54″S 151°45′04″E	
Maclean	Tenterfield	29°08′54″S 152°17′04″E	
Mingoola	Tenterfield	28°59′54″S 151°34′04″E	Mingoola
Moogem	Glen Innes Severn	29°25′54″S 152°15′04″E	Moogem
Morven	Glen Innes Severn	29°19′54″S 152°08′04″E	
Perth	Tenterfield	29°06′54″S 151°28′04″E	
Rock Vale	Tenterfield	29°12′54″S 151°38′04″E	
Romney	Tenterfield	29°21′40″S 151°51′03″E	
Silent Grove	Tenterfield	29°09′54″S 151°43′04″E	Silent Grove
Strathearn	Tenterfield	29°09′54″S 152°00′04″E	
Tarban	Tenterfield	28°58′34″S 151°41′04″E	
Tenterfield	Tenterfield	29°03′54″S 152°01′04″E	Tenterfield
Timbarra	Tenterfield	28°59′54″S 152°13′04″E	Timbarra
Woodside	Tenterfield	29°06′54″S 151°48′04″E	
Wunglebong	Tenterfield	29°11′54″S 152°12′04″E	
