= Stannum (disambiguation) =

Stannum is the Latin word for tin and the source of its chemical symbol Sn.

Stannum may also refer to:

- Stannum, New South Wales, small tin mining village
- Fusinus stannum, a species of sea snail
