= Gresham County =

Gresham
- Cadastral division
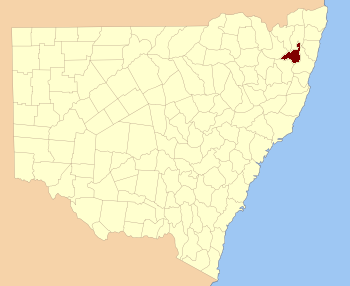
- Location in New South Wales
- Country: Australia
- State: New South Wales
Lands administrative divisions around Gresham
Clive	Drake	Clarence
Gough	Gresham	Fitzroy
Clarke	Clarke	Fitzroy

Gresham County is one of the 141 cadastral divisions of New South Wales.

Gresham County was named in honour of the London merchant, Sir Thomas Gresham (1519–1579). It is located to the south of parts of the Mann River, Nymboida River and Clarence River. It includes parts of the Guy Fawkes River National Park.

== Parishes within this county ==
A full list of parishes found within this county; their current LGA and mapping coordinates to the approximate centre of each location is as follows:

Parish	LGA	Coordinates
Alder	Clarence Valley Council	29°59′54″S 152°36′04″E
Barool	Clarence Valley Council	29°41′54″S 152°19′04″E
Boyd	Clarence Valley Council	29°49′54″S 152°32′04″E
Braylesford	Clarence Valley Council	29°34′54″S 152°36′04″E
Broadmeadows	Clarence Valley Council	29°51′54″S 152°21′04″E
Buccarumbi	Clarence Valley Council	29°49′54″S 152°37′04″E
Camelback	Clarence Valley Council	29°24′54″S 152°31′04″E
Chaelundi	Clarence Valley Council	30°02′54″S 152°20′04″E
Chandler	Clarence Valley Council	30°01′54″S 152°24′04″E
Cowan	Clarence Valley Council	29°40′54″S 152°28′04″E
Cunglebung	Clarence Valley Council	29°44′54″S 152°31′04″E
Dalmorton	Clarence Valley Council	29°45′54″S 152°29′04″E
Glen Nevis	Glen Innes Severn Council	29°54′54″S 152°14′04″E
Grafton	Clarence Valley Council	30°05′54″S 152°24′04″E
Grange	Clarence Valley Council	29°26′54″S 152°35′04″E
Henry	Clarence Valley Council	29°48′54″S 152°14′04″E
Jackadgery	Clarence Valley Council	29°40′54″S 152°33′04″E
Kaloe	Clarence Valley Council	29°29′54″S 152°30′04″E
Marara	Clarence Valley Council	29°53′54″S 152°36′04″E
Marara West	Clarence Valley Council	29°53′54″S 152°32′04″E
Marengo	Clarence Valley Council	29°56′54″S 152°20′04″E
Newbold	Clarence Valley Council	29°31′54″S 152°36′04″E
Newton Boyd	Glen Innes Severn Council	29°47′54″S 152°10′04″E
Nullama	Clarence Valley Council	29°54′54″S 152°25′04″E
Oakwood	Glen Innes Severn Council	29°52′54″S 152°06′04″E
Sara	Glen Innes Severn Council	29°58′54″S 152°06′04″E
Springbrook	Clarence Valley Council	29°46′54″S 152°23′04″E
Stanley	Clarence Valley Council	30°04′54″S 152°31′04″E
Sturt	Clarence Valley Council	30°01′54″S 152°32′04″E
Urania	Clarence Valley Council	29°46′54″S 152°19′04″E
Wellington	Clarence Valley Council	29°41′54″S 152°24′04″E
Willy	Glen Innes Severn Council	29°54′54″S 152°03′04″E
Worra	Glen Innes Severn Council	29°58′54″S 151°59′04″E
