= Buller County =

Buller County may refer to:

- Buller County, New South Wales, Australia
- Buller County, New Zealand
