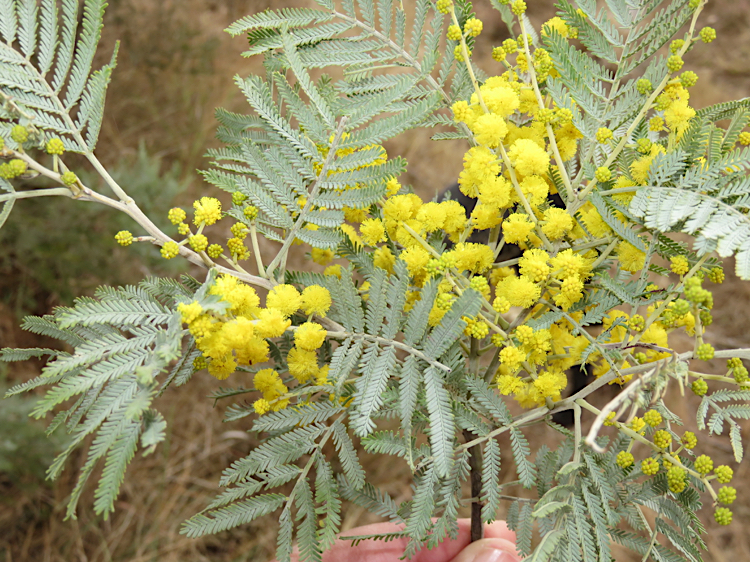
- Subspecies argentifolia

Scientific classification
- Kingdom: Plantae
- Clade: Embryophytes
- Clade: Tracheophytes
- Clade: Angiosperms
- Clade: Eudicots
- Clade: Rosids
- Order: Fabales
- Family: Fabaceae
- Subfamily: Caesalpinioideae
- Clade: Mimosoid clade
- Genus: Acacia
- Species: A. leucoclada

Binomial name
- Acacia leucoclada Tindale
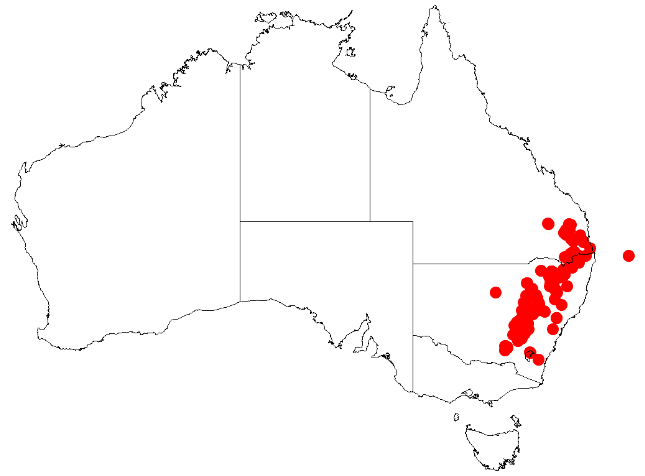
- Occurrence data from AVH

Synonyms
- Racosperma leucocladum (Tindale) Pedley

= Acacia leucoclada =

Northern silver wattle

Species of legume

Acacia leucoclada, commonly known as northern silver wattle, is a species of flowering plant in the family Fabaceae and is endemic to eastern Australia. It is a shrub or mostly spreading tree glabrous branchlets, often covered with a powdery bloom, bipinnate leaves, and spherical heads of yellow to bright yellow or golden yellow flowers in axillary racemes, and straight to slightly curved pods usually slightly constricted between the seeds.

== Description ==
Acacia leucoclada is a shrub or mostly spreading tree that typically grows to a height of 2.5–20 m (8 ft 2 in – 65 ft 7 in) and has smooth grey bark on the upper trunk and rough, fissured dark brown or blackish on the lower trunk. Its branchlets are slightly angled with smooth ridges, glabrous and often covered with a powdery bloom. The tips of immature foliage are covered with soft, silvery or whitish hairs. The leaves are bipinnate, green or silvery, more or less glaucous with 5 to 18 pairs of pinnae 15–55 mm (0.59–2.17 in) long, each with 11 to 45 pairs of knife-like to narrowly oblong pinnules, 1–6 mm (0.039–0.236 in) long and 0.4–1 mm (0.016–0.039 in) wide. The rachis is 20–95 mm (0.79–3.74 in) long on a petiole 5–25 mm (0.20–0.98 in) long. The flowers are borne in spherical heads in racemes in leaf axils or in panicles on the ends of branches on usually hairy peduncles mostly 3–7 mm (0.12–0.28 in) long, each head 4–7 mm (0.16–0.28 in) in diameter with 20 to 26 yellow to bright yellow or golden yellow flowers. Flowering occurs mainly from July to October and the pods are straight to slightly curved, more or less flat, sometimes twisted, up 30–120 mm (1.2–4.7 in) long and 4.5–12 mm (0.18–0.47 in) wide, thinly leathery, often covered with a powdery bloom and more or less leathery.

== Taxonomy ==
Acacia leucoclada was first formally described in 1966, by Mary Tindale in Proceedings of the Linnean Society of New South Wales from a specimen collected in the Warrumbungle Mountains in 1953. The specific epithet (leucoclada) means 'white shoots'.

In the same journal, Tindale described two subspecies of A. leucoclada, and the names are accepted by the Australian Plant Census:

- Acacia leucoclada subsp. argentifolia Tindale is a tree to 20 m (66 ft) high with branchlets with white or grey hairs and glands between all or some pairs of pinnae.
- Acacia leucoclada Tindale subsp. leucoclada is mainly a tree up to 10 m (33 ft) high with glabrous branchlets or with white or grey hairs and only one glands between pinnae.

== Distribution and habitat ==
- Subspecies argentifolia grows in open forest or woodland in sandy soils or loam in South East Queensland near Kingaroy and in the Warwick–Dalveen district. In New South Wales it is found near Woodenbong and in the Liston–Tenterfield area.
- Subspecies leucoclada occurs in New South Wales on the western slopes of the Great Dividing Range between Warialda and Wagga Wagga. It is common in the Pilliga Scrub, rare on the Northern and Southern Tablelands and in the Hunter Valley.

== See also ==
- List of Acacia species
