= Clarke County, New South Wales =

Clarke New South Wales
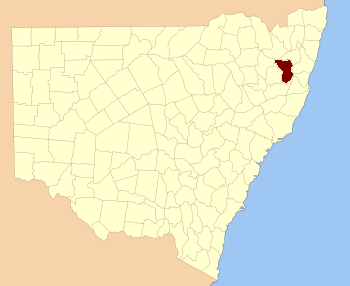
- Location in New South Wales
Lands administrative divisions around Clarke:
Hardinge	Gough	Gresham
Hardinge	Clarke	Fitzroy
Sandon	Vernon	Dudley

Clarke County is one of the 141 cadastral divisions of New South Wales.

Clarke County was named in honour of William Branwhite Clarke (1798–1878).

== Parishes within this county ==
A full list of parishes found within this county; their current LGA and mapping coordinates to the approximate centre of each location is as follows:

Parish	LGA	Coordinates
Aberfoyle	Armidale Regional Council	30°15′54″S 152°05′04″E
Allingham	Armidale Regional Council	30°14′54″S 152°11′04″E
Avondale	Armidale Regional Council	30°19′54″S 152°00′04″E
Bagot	Armidale Regional Council	30°02′54″S 151°45′04″E
Bald Blair	Armidale Regional Council	30°11′54″S 151°48′04″E
Big Hill	Armidale Regional Council	30°44′54″S 152°11′04″E
Blythe	Armidale Regional Council	30°05′54″S 152°09′04″E
Brown	Armidale Regional Council	30°15′54″S 152°14′04″E
Chandler	Armidale Regional Council	30°29′54″S 152°02′04″E
Clarke	Armidale Regional Council	30°39′54″S 152°02′04″E
Clifton	Armidale Regional Council	30°48′54″S 152°06′04″E
Coventry	Armidale Regional Council	30°04′54″S 151°55′04″E
Cunnawarra	Armidale Regional Council	30°32′54″S 152°19′04″E
Dale	Armidale Regional Council	30°07′24″S 152°13′04″E
Day	Armidale Regional Council	30°18′54″S 152°07′04″E
Doughboy	Armidale Regional Council	30°21′24″S 152°12′04″E
Dyke	Kempsey Shire	30°42′54″S 152°19′04″E
Euringilly	Armidale Regional Council	30°25′07″S 152°07′56″E
Falls	Armidale Regional Council	30°16′54″S 152°16′04″E
George	Armidale Regional Council	30°39′54″S 152°10′04″E
Gill	Armidale Regional Council	30°14′54″S 151°53′04″E
Guy Fawkes	Armidale Regional Council	30°18′54″S 152°19′04″E
Hall	Armidale Regional Council	30°01′54″S 151°57′04″E
Howell	Armidale Regional Council	30°21′54″S 152°08′04″E
Jeogla	Armidale Regional Council	30°34′54″S 152°07′04″E
Kangaroo	Armidale Regional Council	30°17′54″S 152°11′04″E
Lagune	Armidale Regional Council	30°15′54″S 151°50′04″E
Lookout	Armidale Regional Council	30°27′54″S 152°22′04″E
Marengo	Clarence Valley Council	30°14′54″S 152°20′04″E
Mitchell	Armidale Regional Council	29°59′54″S 152°11′04″E
Mount Ross	Armidale Regional Council	30°00′54″S 152°15′04″E
Mowle	Armidale Regional Council	30°39′54″S 152°15′04″E
Never Never	Clarence Valley Council	30°06′54″S 152°19′04″E
Nowland	Armidale Regional Council	30°09′54″S 151°59′04″E
Oban	Armidale Regional Council	30°07′54″S 151°53′04″E
Poganbilla	Armidale Regional Council	30°31′54″S 152°04′04″E
Rampsbeck	Armidale Regional Council	30°11′24″S 152°07′04″E
Rigney	Armidale Regional Council	30°21′54″S 152°16′04″E
Rockvale	Armidale Regional Council	30°22′54″S 151°58′04″E
Ryanda	Glen Innes Severn Council	30°03′54″S 151°41′04″E
Seeley	Armidale Regional Council	30°02′54″S 152°00′04″E
Serpentine	Armidale Regional Council	30°29′54″S 152°15′04″E
Snowy	Armidale Regional Council	30°29′54″S 152°11′04″E
Stanton	Armidale Regional Council	30°11′54″S 151°54′04″E
Styx	Armidale Regional Council	30°33′54″S 152°12′04″E
Tiara	Armidale Regional Council	30°44′54″S 152°04′04″E
Towagal	Armidale Regional Council	30°04′54″S 151°50′04″E
Tubbamurra	Armidale Regional Council	30°07′54″S 151°47′04″E
Ward	Armidale Regional Council	30°06′54″S 151°59′04″E
Warner	Armidale Regional Council	30°13′54″S 151°59′04″E
White	Armidale Regional Council	30°07′24″S 152°07′04″E
