= Tyringham (disambiguation) =

Tyringham is a village in Buckinghamshire, England.

Tyringham may also refer to:

- Tyringham, Massachusetts, United States
- Tyringham, New South Wales, Australia, see Clarence Valley Council#Towns and localities
- William Tyringham, an English politician
