= Liston, New South Wales =

Liston New South Wales
- Coordinates: 28°39′00″S 152°05′00″E
- Population: 130 (SAL 2021)
- Postcode(s): 2372
- LGA(s): Tenterfield Shire
- County: Buller
- State electorate(s): Lismore
- Federal division(s): New England

Liston is a small mountain village in northern New South Wales, Australia in Tenterfield Shire local government area. It lies just inside the eastern boundary of the New South Wales, Queensland border on the old Cobb & Co route, now the Mount Lindesay Highway, which used to extend from Brisbane to Tenterfield, New South Wales.

Liston was once a thriving community centre for a busy tin and silver mining industry. It still reflects the Australian lifestyle from many years ago when people relied on tank water for drinking and washing, septic toilet systems and wood fire heating in winter. While Liston is part of New South Wales, the closest major town is the Queensland country town of Stanthorpe, which is approximately 15 km away by paved roads. Its citizens use Stanthorpe's hospital, schools, churches, shops, post office, hotels and business services. The Liston community still relies heavily on grazing cattle, although the tourism industry and new crops such as lavender are also making inroads.

Liston is part of the Granite Belt, and has good access to Rivertree (home of a trail bike event held in December each year) and to Bald Rock, which is a large granite outcrop rising about 200 metres above the surrounding landscape. It is also near Boonoo Boonoo, Girraween, Sundown, and Main Range National Parks. The latter includes Queen Mary Falls. It is convenient to Storm King Dam, which offers fishing and boating and more than 40 Granite Belt wineries.

While Liston used to be part of the Cobb and Co Stage Coach route and Mount Lindesay Highway used to be a major Brisbane to Sydney route, it is now a quiet country village with a community hall, park, holiday accommodation and local residents homes. Liston enjoys four seasons and usually has a reliable rainfall, being on the eastern fall of the Great Dividing Range.

Liston Post Office opened on 1 July 1916 and closed in 1976.
