= Fitzroy County =

Fitzroy New South Wales
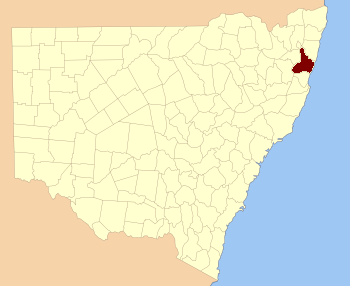
- Location in New South Wales
Lands administrative divisions around Fitzroy:
Gresham	Clarence	Pacific Ocean
Gresham	Fitzroy	Pacific Ocean
Clarke	Raleigh	Pacific Ocean

Fitzroy County is one of the 141 cadastral divisions of New South Wales. It lies south of the Orara River, and north of the Bellinger River, and includes Coffs Harbour.

Fitzroy County was named in honour of Governor of New South Wales Sir Charles Augustus Fitzroy.

== Parishes within this county ==
A full list of parishes found within this county; their current LGA and mapping coordinates to the approximate centre of each location is as follows:

Parish	LGA	Coordinates
Allan	Bellingen Shire Council	30°14′54″S 152°45′04″E
Allans Water	Clarence Valley Council	30°18′54″S 152°28′04″E
Bagawa	Clarence Valley Council	30°09′54″S 152°59′04″E
Bardool	Clarence Valley Council	29°59′54″S 152°45′04″E
Bardsley	Clarence Valley Council	29°51′54″S 152°53′04″E
Blaxland	Clarence Valley Council	29°51′54″S 152°45′04″E
Blicks	Clarence Valley Council	30°10′54″S 152°31′04″E
Bligh	Bellingen Shire Council	30°21′54″S 152°43′04″E
Bobo	Clarence Valley Council	30°09′54″S 152°44′04″E
Bostobrick	Bellingen Shire Council	30°16′54″S 152°36′04″E
Chambigne	Clarence Valley Council	29°43′54″S 152°43′04″E
Coff	City of Coffs Harbour	30°19′54″S 153°00′04″E
Comlaroi	City of Coffs Harbour	30°14′54″S 153°00′04″E
Cope	Clarence Valley Council	30°05′54″S 152°44′04″E
Corindi	Clarence Valley Council	30°00′54″S 153°10′04″E
Duckan Duckan	Clarence Valley Council	29°36′54″S 152°39′04″E
Ermington	Clarence Valley Council	29°47′54″S 152°40′04″E
Fenton	Bellingen Shire Council	30°20′54″S 152°36′04″E
Gundar	City of Coffs Harbour	30°10′54″S 152°52′04″E
Hernani	Clarence Valley Council	30°18′54″S 152°24′04″E
Hyland	Clarence Valley Council	30°15′24″S 152°24′34″E
Jardine	Clarence Valley Council	30°02′54″S 152°42′04″E
Koukandowie	Clarence Valley Council	29°55′54″S 152°51′04″E
Kremnos	Clarence Valley Council	29°59′54″S 152°58′04″E
Leigh	Bellingen Shire Council	30°17′54″S 152°45′04″E
Martin	Clarence Valley Council	29°52′54″S 152°42′04″E
Meldrum Downs	Bellingen Shire Council	30°21′54″S 152°30′04″E
Moonee	City of Coffs Harbour	30°13′54″S 153°06′04″E
Moonpar	Clarence Valley Council	30°13′54″S 152°37′04″E
Nymboida	Clarence Valley Council	29°56′54″S 152°45′04″E
Orara	City of Coffs Harbour	30°06′54″S 153°03′04″E
Ross	Clarence Valley Council	29°42′54″S 152°39′04″E
Shannon	Clarence Valley Council	29°57′54″S 152°41′04″E
Shea	Clarence Valley Council	30°05′54″S 152°34′04″E
Sherwood	Clarence Valley Council	30°00′54″S 153°00′04″E
Sherwood	Clarence Valley Council	29°57′54″S 153°03′04″E
Stewart	Bellingen Shire Council	30°17′54″S 152°52′04″E
Tallawudjah	Clarence Valley Council	30°02′54″S 152°57′04″E
Toothill	Clarence Valley Council	29°47′54″S 152°48′04″E
Towallum	Clarence Valley Council	30°04′54″S 152°52′04″E
Turville	Clarence Valley Council	29°38′54″S 152°45′04″E
Tyringham	Clarence Valley Council	30°14′54″S 152°30′04″E
Ucombe	Bellingen Shire Council	30°14′54″S 152°54′04″E
Waihou	Clarence Valley Council	30°02′54″S 153°00′04″E
Wiriri	Clarence Valley Council	30°06′54″S 152°40′04″E
Wongawanga	City of Coffs Harbour	30°17′54″S 152°58′04″E
Woolgoolga	City of Coffs Harbour	30°06′54″S 153°09′04″E
