= Ewingar, New South Wales =

Ewingar New South Wales
- Coordinates: 29°5′39″S 152°30′26″E
- Population: 53 (SAL 2021)
- Postcode(s): 2460
- Location: 80 km (50 mi) NW of Grafton; 48 km (30 mi) E of Tenterfield
- LGA(s): Clarence Valley Council
- County: Drake
- State electorate(s): Clarence
- Federal division(s): Page

Ewingar is a locality located in the Northern Rivers Region of New South Wales.

The bus used in the film The Adventures of Priscilla, Queen of the Desert, the namesake of the film, was located in Ewingar between 2006 and 2023, when it was acquired by the National Motor Museum in South Australia.

== Population ==
In the 2016 Census, there were 67 people in Ewingar (State Suburb(SSC)). 66.2% of people were Male and 33.8% of people were Female. The median age was 58 years.
