= County of Stanley, Queensland =

Stanley
- Cadastral division
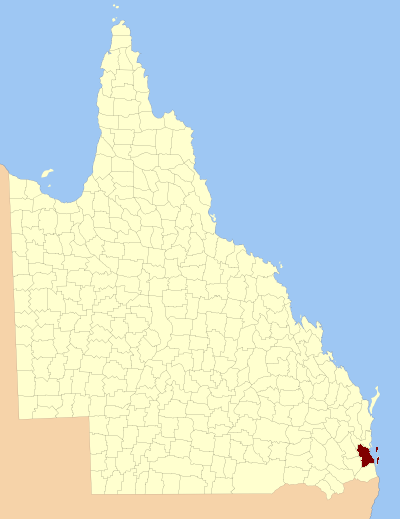
- Location within Queensland
- Country: Australia
- State: Queensland
Lands administrative divisions around Stanley
Cavendish	Canning	Pacific Ocean
Churchill	Stanley	Pacific Ocean
Churchill	Ward	Pacific Ocean

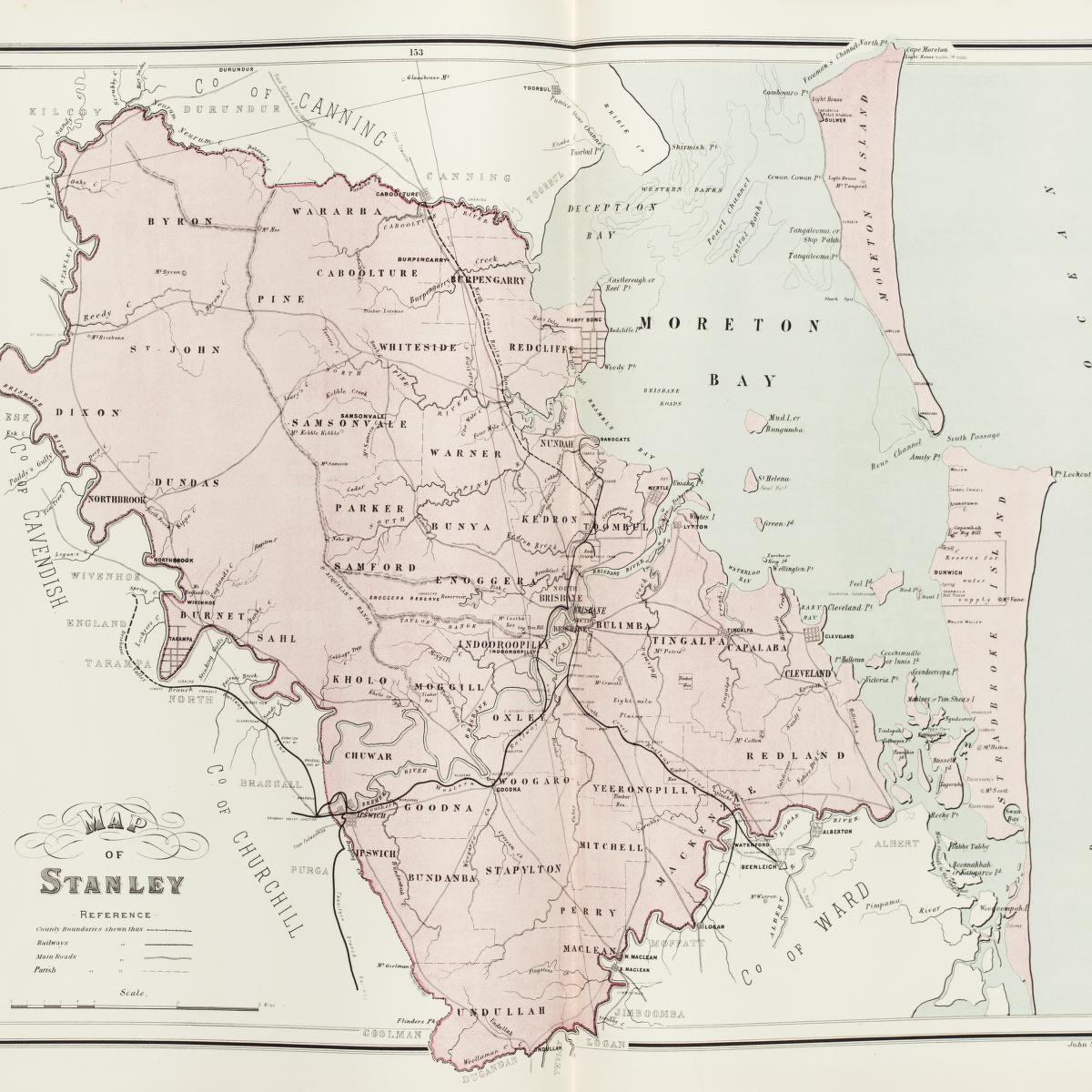
Stanley county in 1886

The County of Stanley is a cadastral division centred on the city of Brisbane in Queensland, Australia, that is used mainly for the purpose of registering land titles. It was named after Edward Stanley, who was three times British prime minister in the 1850s and 1860s. It is bounded by the Logan River in the south, the Brisbane River at what is now Lake Wivenhoe in the west, the Stanley River at what is now Lake Somerset in the north-west, and Caboolture River in the north. It includes Moreton Island and Stradbroke Island, and extends west to Ipswich's CBD, south to Loganlea and north to Morayfield.

== History ==
Stanley was formerly a county in New South Wales between the establishment of Brisbane in 1826, and the formation of Queensland as a separate colony in 1859, and was officially established by proclamation on 27 February 1843. It was generally understood (though only somewhat formally defined) to include the land between the 27th and 28th parallels of latitude, Moreton Bay and the western ranges, covering an area of 1,724 square miles (4,470 km^{2}). In 1852 it had a population of 2,000. Wheat, coffee, cotton and tobacco were described as being important crops. By 1863, the county had contracted to its present boundaries.

On 7 March 1901, the Governor of Queensland proclaimed new boundaries under the Land Act 1897, and Stanley was described as follows:

Bounded on the south by the county of Ward; on the west by the western boundaries of the parishes of Undullah, Ipswich and Chuwar to the Brisbane River, by that river and the Stanley River upwards to Oaky Creek, by that creek upwards to the west boundary of the parish of Byron [...] by the north boundaries of the parishes of Pine, Caboolture and Burpengary; and on the east by the Pacific Ocean,—including Moreton and Stradbroke Islands.

== Parishes ==
Stanley is divided into parishes, listed as follows:

Parish	LGA	Coordinates	Towns/localities
Bulimba	Brisbane	27°29′S 153°04′E	Bulimba, Carina, Coorparoo, Greenslopes
Bundamba	Ipswich	27°42′S 152°50′E	Redbank Plains
Bunya	Moreton Bay	27°22′S 152°56′E	Albany Creek, Everton Park, Ferny Hills
Burnett	Somerset	27°23′S 152°40′E	
Burpengary	Moreton Bay	27°08′S 152°59′E	Burpengary
Byron	Somerset	27°04′S 152°41′E	Mount Mee
Caboolture	Moreton Bay	27°07′S 152°52′E	Caboolture South, Morayfield
Capalaba	Redland	27°32′S 153°11′E	Alexandra Hills, Birkdale, Capalaba, Wellington Point
Chuwar	Ipswich	27°34′S 152°48′E	Karalee, North Ipswich, Tivoli
Cleveland	Redland	27°32′S 153°18′E	Cleveland, Victoria Point
Dixon	Somerset	27°12′S 152°33′E	
Dundas	Somerset	27°19′S 152°41′E	
Enoggera	Brisbane	27°25′S 152°56′E	Enoggera, Keperra, Ferny Grove, St Johns Wood, Windsor, Ashgrove
Goodna	Ipswich	27°37′S 152°51′E	Bundamba, Goodna, Redbank
Indooroopilly	Brisbane	27°30′S 152°59′E	Indooroopilly, St Lucia, Kenmore
Ipswich	Ipswich	27°39′S 152°47′E	Ipswich, Booval, Raceview
Kedron	Brisbane	27°22′S 153°00′E	Aspley, Chermside, Kedron, Stafford
Kholo	Brisbane	27°29′S 152°48′E	Karana Downs
Mackenzie	Logan	27°40′S 153°07′E	Cornubia, Loganlea, Slacks Creek, Shailer Park
Maclean	Scenic Rim	27°47′S 152°57′E	North Maclean, South Maclean
Minjerriba	Redland	27°39′S 153°26′E	North Stradbroke Island
Mitchell	Logan	27°40′S 153°00′E	Browns Plains, Park Ridge
Moggill	Brisbane	27°31′S 152°52′E	Moggill, Pullenvale
Noogoon	Brisbane	27°23′S 153°14′E	
North Brisbane	Brisbane	27°27′S 153°02′E	Brisbane CBD, New Farm, Toowong
North Brook	Somerset	27°18′S 152°35′E	
Nundah	Brisbane	27°19′S 153°03′E	Bracken Ridge, Brighton, Sandgate, Deagon
Oxley	Brisbane	27°34′S 152°56′E	Inala, Jindalee, Oxley, Sherwood, Middle Park
Parker	Moreton Bay	27°21′S 152°48′E	Closeburn, Mount Glorious
Perry	Scenic Rim	27°44′S 153°00′E	Park Ridge South
Pine	Moreton Bay	27°07′S 152°47′E	Ocean View
Redcliffe	Moreton Bay	27°14′S 153°03′E	Kallangur, Petrie, Redcliffe
Redland	Redland	27°37′S 153°15′E	Carbrook, Mount Cotton, Redland Bay
Russell	Redland	27°38′S 153°22′E	Russell Island
Sahl	Somerset	27°25′S 152°44′E	
Samford	Moreton Bay	27°23′S 152°51′E	Samford, Mount Nebo
Samsonvale	Moreton Bay	27°14′S 152°47′E	Dayboro
South Brisbane	Brisbane	27°29′S 153°00′E	South Brisbane, Woolloongabba
St John	Somerset	27°12′S 152°40′E	
Stapylton	Ipswich	27°42′S 152°55′E	Camira, Springfield, Greenbank
Stradbroke	Redland	27°28′S 153°27′E	North Stradbroke Island
Tiffin	Brisbane	27°15′S 153°25′E	Moreton Island
Tingalpa	Brisbane	27°30′S 153°08′E	Carindale, Manly, Tingalpa, Wynnum, Rochedale,
Toombul	Brisbane	27°23′S 153°06′E	Hamilton, Nudgee, Nundah, Pinkenba, Clayfield, Albion, Eagle Farm, Hendra
Undullah	Scenic Rim	27°49′S 152°52′E	
Wararba	Moreton Bay	27°02′S 152°51′E	Wamuran
Warner	Moreton Bay	27°19′S 152°56′E	Strathpine, Lawnton
Whiteside	Moreton Bay	27°13′S 152°53′E	Whiteside
Woogaroo	Logan	27°38′S 152°57′E	Forest Lake
Yeerongpilly	Brisbane	27°36′S 153°4′E	Acacia Ridge, Coopers Plains, Calamvale

== See also ==
- Local government in Australia
- County
