= County of Merivale =

Merivale Queensland
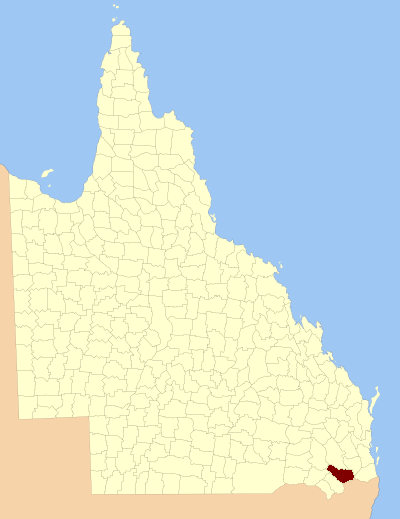
- Location within Queensland
Lands administrative divisions around Merivale:
Derby	Aubigny	Churchill
Marsh	Merivale	Ward
Bentinck	Buller (NSW)	Rous (NSW)

The County of Merivale is a county located on the southern boundary of the state of Queensland, Australia. Like all counties in Queensland, it is a non-functional administrative unit, that is used mainly for the purpose of registering land titles. The county was named in honour of Herman Merivale, the British permanent Under-Secretary of State for the Colonies. Its boundaries were declared and made subject to the Land Act 1897 on 7 March 1901. Population centres within the County of Merivale include the towns of Warwick, Allora and Killarney.

== Parishes ==
Parish	LGA	Coordinates	Towns
Allora	Southern Downs	28°02′S 151°59′E	Allora
Canal Creek	Southern Downs	28°11′S 151°32′E	Karara
Canning	Southern Downs	28°11′S 152°07′E	
Cunningham	Southern Downs	28°18′S 152°13′E	Tannymorel
Dalrymple	Southern Downs	28°01′S 151°52′E	
Deuchar	Southern Downs	28°07′S 152°12′E	
Ellangowan	Toowoomba	27°55′S 151°37′E	Ellangowan
Emu Vale	Southern Downs	28°14′S 152°22′E	
Gilbert	Southern Downs	28°07′S 152°20′E	
Gladfield	Southern Downs	28°02′S 152°18′E	
Glengallan	Southern Downs	28°07′S 152°04′E	
Goomburra	Southern Downs	28°01′S 152°08′E	Goomburra
Gore	Toowoomba	27°57′S 151°22′E	
Hanmer	Southern Downs	28°07′S 151°39′E	
Killarney	Southern Downs	28°22′S 152°18′E	Killarney
Kings Creek	Toowoomba	27°59′S 151°47′E	
Leslie	Southern Downs	28°07′S 151°59′E	
Leyburn	Southern Downs	28°03′S 151°35′E	Leyburn
North Toolburra	Southern Downs	28°06′S 151°53′E	
Palgrave	Southern Downs	28°18′S 151°44′E	
Pratten	Southern Downs	28°08′S 151°45′E	Pratten
Robinson	Southern Downs	28°11′S 152°13′E	Yangan
Rosenthal	Southern Downs	28°22′S 151°56′E	Dalveen
South Toolburra	Southern Downs	28°13′S 151°48′E	
Talgai	Southern Downs	28°01′S 151°42′E	
Tummaville	Toowoomba	27°59′S 151°29′E	
Warwick	Southern Downs	28°12′S 152°00′E	Warwick
Wildash	Southern Downs	28°21′S 152°05′E	

== See also ==
- Lands administrative divisions of Queensland

== External links ==
- "Map of the County of Merivale". Queensland Government. 1923.
