= Parish of Stewart (Fitzroy County) =

Coordinates: 30°17′54″S 152°52′4″E

Stewart is a civil parish of Fitzroy County in New South Wales. It is located in Bellingen Shire.
