= Rous County =

Rous
- Cadastral division
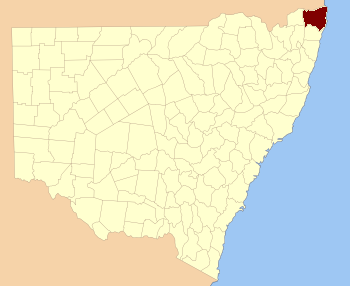
- Location in New South Wales
- Country: Australia
- State: New South Wales
Lands administrative divisions around Rous
Merivale (Qld)	Ward (Qld)	Pacific Ocean
Buller	Rous	Pacific Ocean
Drake	Richmond	Pacific Ocean

Rous County is one of the 141 cadastral divisions of New South Wales. It is located at the north-east tip of the state. It is bordered on the north by the border with Queensland and on the south by the Richmond River. It contains Lismore, Byron Bay and Murwillumbah. Note that Rous County should not be confused with Rous County Council, which despite the common name is a legally distinct entity, covering a separate (albeit overlapping) geographical area, the Rous county district.

Rous County was named in honour of Admiral Henry John Rous (1795–1877).

== Parishes within this county ==
A full list of parishes found within this county; their current LGA and mapping coordinates to the approximate centre of each location is as follows:

Parish	LGA	Coordinates
Babyil	Kyogle Shire	28°37′54″S 152°45′04″E
Ballina	Ballina Shire	28°49′54″S 153°33′04″E
Berwick	Tweed Shire	28°13′54″S 153°25′04″E
Bexhill	City of Lismore	28°45′54″S 153°22′04″E
Billinudgel	Tweed Shire	28°30′54″S 153°30′04″E
Bingal	Ballina Shire	28°56′54″S 153°28′04″E
Blakebrook	City of Lismore	28°45′54″S 153°16′04″E
Boorabee	City of Lismore	28°39′54″S 153°05′04″E
Broadwater	City of Lismore	29°00′54″S 153°24′04″E
Brunswick	Byron Shire	28°35′54″S 153°31′04″E
Bungabbee	City of Lismore	28°43′54″S 153°08′04″E
Burrell	Kyogle Shire	28°23′54″S 153°15′04″E
Byron	Byron Shire	28°39′54″S 153°32′04″E
Chillingham	Kyogle Shire	28°16′54″S 153°13′04″E
Clunes	City of Lismore	28°40′54″S 153°25′04″E
Condong	Tweed Shire	28°19′54″S 153°27′04″E
Coraki	City of Lismore	29°00′54″S 153°19′04″E
Cougal	Kyogle Shire	28°22′54″S 152°57′04″E
Cudgen	Tweed Shire	28°16′54″S 153°33′04″E
Dunbible	Tweed Shire	28°22′54″S 153°23′04″E
Dunoon	City of Lismore	28°39′54″S 153°19′04″E
Dyraaba	Kyogle Shire	28°47′54″S 152°47′04″E
East Gundurimba	City of Lismore	28°51′54″S 153°18′04″E
Ettrick	Kyogle Shire	28°34′54″S 152°52′04″E
Fairy Mount	Kyogle Shire	28°33′54″S 153°03′04″E
Findon	Kyogle Shire	28°22′54″S 152°51′04″E
Geneva	Kyogle Shire	28°36′54″S 152°57′04″E
Gooninbar	Kyogle Shire	28°29′54″S 153°16′04″E
Hanging Rock	City of Lismore	28°31′54″S 153°08′04″E
Jasper	Byron Shire	28°36′54″S 153°26′04″E
Jiggi	City of Lismore	28°36′54″S 153°08′04″E
Kunghur	Tweed Shire	28°27′54″S 153°12′04″E
Kynnumboon	Tweed Shire	28°16′54″S 153°20′04″E
Kyogle Shire	Richmond Valley Council	28°45′54″S 153°00′04″E
Langwell	Kyogle Shire	28°38′54″S 152°51′04″E
Lismore	City of Lismore	28°49′54″S 153°23′04″E
Loadstone	Kyogle Shire	28°25′54″S 152°57′04″E
Meerschaum	Ballina Shire	28°53′54″S 153°24′04″E
Mooball	Tweed Shire	28°24′54″S 153°29′04″E
Mullumbimby	Byron Shire	28°31′54″S 153°26′04″E
Mummulgum	Kyogle Shire	28°52′54″S 152°47′04″E
Murwillumbah	Tweed Shire	28°19′54″S 153°17′04″E
Newrybar	Ballina Shire	28°44′54″S 153°33′04″E
Nimbin	City of Lismore	28°37′54″S 153°14′04″E
North Casino	Richmond Valley Council	28°46′54″S 153°04′04″E
North Codrington	City of Lismore	28°55′54″S 153°15′04″E
North Lismore	City of Lismore	28°44′54″S 153°18′04″E
Nullum	Tweed Shire	28°26′54″S 153°22′04″E
Pimlico	Ballina Shire	28°53′54″S 153°30′04″E
Queebun	Kyogle Shire	28°44′54″S 152°51′04″E
Roseberry	Kyogle Shire	28°29′54″S 152°52′04″E
Runnymede	Kyogle Shire	28°39′54″S 153°02′04″E
Runnymede	Kyogle Shire	28°40′54″S 153°00′04″E
Sherwood	Kyogle Shire	28°28′54″S 152°46′04″E
South Gundurimba	City of Lismore	28°51′54″S 153°13′04″E
South Lismore	City of Lismore	28°48′54″S 153°15′04″E
Stratheden	Kyogle Shire	28°44′54″S 152°57′04″E
Terania	City of Lismore	28°33′54″S 153°15′04″E
Terranora	Tweed Shire	28°12′54″S 153°30′04″E
Teven	Byron Shire	28°45′54″S 153°32′04″E
Tomki	Richmond Valley Council	28°49′54″S 153°08′04″E
Toolond	Tweed Shire	28°31′54″S 153°21′04″E
Toonumbar	Kyogle Shire	28°32′54″S 152°46′04″E
Tuckombil	Ballina Shire	28°49′54″S 153°28′04″E
Tuckurimba	City of Lismore	28°55′54″S 153°19′04″E
Tunstall	City of Lismore	28°41′54″S 153°14′04″E
Tyalgum	Tweed Shire	28°22′54″S 153°09′04″E
Tygalgah	Tweed Shire	28°18′54″S 153°25′04″E
Unumgar	Kyogle Shire	28°22′54″S 152°45′04″E
Warrazambil	Kyogle Shire	28°29′54″S 153°04′04″E
Whian Whian	City of Lismore	28°35′54″S 153°20′04″E
Wiangaree	Kyogle Shire	28°33′54″S 153°00′04″E
Wollumbin	Tweed Shire	28°22′54″S 153°19′04″E
Worendo	Kyogle Shire	28°22′54″S 153°04′04″E
Wyndham	Kyogle Shire	28°30′54″S 152°56′04″E
