= Alice, New South Wales =

Rual locality of Clarance Valley, News South Wales

Alice
- Region
- Coordinates: 29.0408°S 152.5881°E
- Country: Australia
- State: New South Wales
- Region: Northern Rivers
- LGA: Clarence Valley Council

Government
  - State electorate: Clarence
  - Federal division: Page

Area
  - Total: 13.2753 km^{2} (5.1256 sq mi)

Population
  - Total: 0 (2021)
  - Density: 0.00/km^{2} (0.00/sq mi)
- Time zone: UTC+10:00 (AEST)
  - Summer (DST): UTC+11:00 (AEDT)
- Postcode: 2469
- County: Drake
- Parish: Alice
- Gazetted: 18-10-1996

Alice is a rural locality in the Northern Rivers region of New South Wales, Australia. It is situated approximately 22 kilometres south of Tabulam.

== Geography ==
Alice covers an area of 58.332 square kilometres.

== Demographics ==
As of the 2021 census, Alice had "no people or a very low population".
