= Richmond County, New South Wales =

Richmond New South Wales
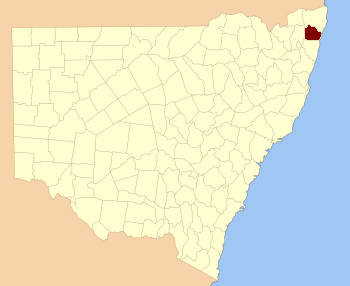
- Location in New South Wales
Lands administrative divisions around Richmond:
| Buller | Rous | Pacific Ocean |
| Drake | Richmond | Pacific Ocean |
| Drake | Clarence | Pacific Ocean |

Richmond County is one of the 141 cadastral divisions of New South Wales. It lies south of the Richmond River and includes South Casino.

Richmond County was named in honour of Charles Gordon Lennox, Fifth Duke of Richmond (1791–1860).

== Parishes within this county ==
A full list of parishes found within this county; their current LGA and mapping coordinates to the approximate centre of each location is as follows:

| Parish | LGA | Coordinates |
|---|---|---|
| Barrawanga | Richmond Valley Council | 29°09′54″S 153°06′04″E |
| Bundock | Richmond Valley Council | 28°50′54″S 152°56′04″E |
| Bungawalbin | Richmond Valley Council | 29°04′54″S 153°17′04″E |
| Busby | Richmond Valley Council | 28°59′54″S 152°48′04″E |
| Camira | Clarence Valley Council | 29°15′54″S 152°56′04″E |
| Coombell | Richmond Valley Council | 28°59′54″S 152°58′04″E |
| Darke | Richmond Valley Council | 29°07′54″S 153°05′04″E |
| Dobie | Clarence Valley Council | 29°10′54″S 152°49′04″E |
| Donaldson | Richmond Valley Council | 29°07′54″S 153°14′04″E |
| Doubleduke | Richmond Valley Council | 29°10′54″S 153°16′04″E |
| East Casino | Richmond Valley Council | 28°53′54″S 153°07′04″E |
| Ellangowan | Richmond Valley Council | 29°00′54″S 153°08′04″E |
| Esk | Richmond Valley Council | 29°13′54″S 153°21′04″E |
| Evans | Richmond Valley Council | 29°09′54″S 153°22′04″E |
| Gibberagee | Richmond Valley Council | 29°14′54″S 153°09′04″E |
| Hogarth | Richmond Valley Council | 29°01′54″S 152°53′04″E |
| Marsh | Clarence Valley Council | 29°15′54″S 152°51′04″E |
| Mongogarie | Richmond Valley Council | 28°56′54″S 152°50′04″E |
| Myall | Richmond Valley Council | 29°17′54″S 153°01′04″E |
| Myrtle | Clarence Valley Council | 29°07′54″S 152°59′04″E |
| Nandabah | Richmond Valley Council | 29°03′54″S 152°58′04″E |
| Powerpa | Clarence Valley Council | 29°12′54″S 152°56′04″E |
| Richmond | Richmond Valley Council | 28°58′54″S 153°04′04″E |
| Riley | Richmond Valley Council | 29°01′54″S 153°28′04″E |
| Shannon | Richmond Valley Council | 28°53′54″S 152°54′04″E |
| South Ballina | Ballina Shire | 28°55′54″S 153°31′04″E |
| South Casino | Richmond Valley Council | 28°53′54″S 153°03′04″E |
| South Codrington | Richmond Valley Council | 28°56′54″S 153°15′04″E |
| Tabbimoble | Richmond Valley Council | 29°15′54″S 153°16′04″E |
| Tatham | Richmond Valley Council | 28°56′54″S 153°11′04″E |
| West Coraki | Richmond Valley Council | 29°01′54″S 153°14′04″E |
| Whiporie | Richmond Valley Council | 29°14′54″S 153°03′04″E |
| Wooroowoolgan | Richmond Valley Council | 28°52′54″S 153°00′04″E |
| Woram | Richmond Valley Council | 28°55′54″S 153°08′04″E |
| Wyandah | Clarence Valley Council | 29°07′54″S 152°50′04″E |
| Wyon | Richmond Valley Council | 29°04′54″S 152°46′04″E |
