= County of Ward, Queensland =

Ward Queensland
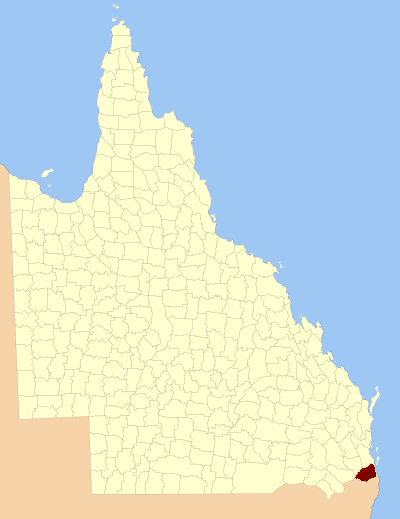
- Location within Queensland
Lands administrative divisions around Ward:
Churchill	Stanley	Pacific Ocean
Merivale	Ward	Pacific Ocean
Buller (NSW)	Rous (NSW)	Pacific Ocean

The County of Ward is a county (a cadastral division) in the south-eastern corner of Queensland, Australia. The main urban area within the county is the city of the Gold Coast, and it also extends to include the southern parts of the West Moreton region centred on Beaudesert and Boonah.

== History ==
Ward was first created by an Order in Council by the Governor of New South Wales on 30 December 1848. It was then described in the following terms:

County of Ward, containing about 1105 square miles. Bounded on the south by the range which runs from Point Danger to Mount Lindesay, and thence to Wilsons Peak on the Great Dividing Range; on the north-west by the range which divides the waters of the Teviot from those of the Bremer, until it meets the 28th parallel of south latitude; on the north by that parallel; and on the east by the sea-coast to Point Danger.

The Stanley–Ward boundary was somewhat imprecise — the 28th parallel met the sea near Southport, but gazettals and newspaper reports in the Moreton Bay Courier of land sales in the 1850s noted land between the Logan and Albert rivers as being within Ward, and numerous reports from 1863 onwards identified Boyd, Moffatt and Logan parishes to be part of Ward.

Upon the separation of Queensland from New South Wales in 1859, the southern boundary of Ward became part of the southern boundary of the new colony. On 7 March 1901, the Governor of Queensland proclaimed new boundaries under the Land Act 1897, which were described as follows:

Commencing at Point Danger, and bounded thence on the south by the southern boundary of the State; on the west by the western boundaries of the parishes of Alford, Coochin and Dugandan; on the north by Woollaman Creek and the Logan River; and on the east by Moreton Bay, the Broadwater and the Pacific Ocean.

== Parishes ==
Like all counties in Queensland, Ward is divided into parishes. The parishes current LGA and mapping coordinates to the approximate centre of each location is as follows:

Parish	LGA	Coordinates	Towns
Albert	Gold Coast	27°46′S 153°18′E	Alberton, Ormeau (East), Woongoolba
Alford	Scenic Rim	28°11′S 152°33′E	
Barrow	Gold Coast	27°56′S 153°20′E	Paradise Point, Oxenford
Beaudesert	Scenic Rim	28°03′S 152°59′E	Beaudesert, Laravale
Boonnahbah	Gold Coast	27°46′S 153°24′E	
Boyd	Logan	27°44′S 153°11′E	Beenleigh, Bethania, Windaroo
Bromelton	Scenic Rim	27°59′S 152°53′E	Bromelton
Cedar	Gold Coast	27°56′S 153°15′E	Tamborine Mountain, Upper Coomera
Coochin	Scenic Rim	28°06′S 152°38′E	Boonah, Mount Alford
Coomera	Gold Coast	27°52′S 153°21′E	Coomera
Currigee	Gold Coast	27°50′S 153°26′E	South Stradbroke Island
Darlington	Gold Coast	27°48′S 153°12′E	Ormeau (West)
Dugandan	Scenic Rim	27°56′S 152°47′E	
Gilston	Gold Coast	28°04′S 153°21′E	Broadbeach, Burleigh Heads
Jimboomba	Logan	27°51′S 153°02′E	Jimboomba
Kerry	Scenic Rim	28°09′S 153°04′E	Kerry
Knapp	Scenic Rim	28°08′S 152°48′E	Rathdowney
Logan	Logan	27°54′S 153°00′E	Woodhill
Melcombe	Scenic Rim	28°14′S 152°38′E	
Moffatt	Logan	27°47′S 153°06′E	Logan Village, Waterford
Mudgeeraba	Gold Coast	28°08′S 153°22′E	Mudgeeraba
Mundoolun	Logan	27°54′S 153°04′E	Mundoolun
Nerang	Gold Coast	27°59′S 153°22′E	Nerang, Southport, Carrara
Nindooinbah	Scenic Rim	28°03′S 153°04′E	
Numinbah	Gold Coast	28°11′S 153°15′E	Numinbah Valley, Springbrook
Palen	Scenic Rim	28°16′S 152°46′E	
Pimpama	Gold Coast	27°49′S 153°18′E	Pimpama
Roberts	Scenic Rim	28°14′S 153°08′E	
Sarabah	Scenic Rim	28°06′S 153°07′E	
Tabragalba	Scenic Rim	27°59′S 153°07′E	Canungra
Tallebudgera	Gold Coast	28°10′S 153°26′E	Palm Beach, Coolangatta
Tamborine	Scenic Rim	27°55′S 153°09′E	Tamborine
Tamrookum	Scenic Rim	28°04′S 152°49′E	Tamrookum
Telemon	Scenic Rim	28°14′S 152°58′E	
Teviot	Scenic Rim	27°53′S 152°56′E	
Wickham	Logan	27°49′S 153°09′E	
Witheren	Scenic Rim	28°04′S 153°11′E	Beechmont, Witheren

== See also ==
- Cadastral divisions of Queensland
