= Drake, New South Wales =

Town in New South Wales, Australia

Drake
- Town
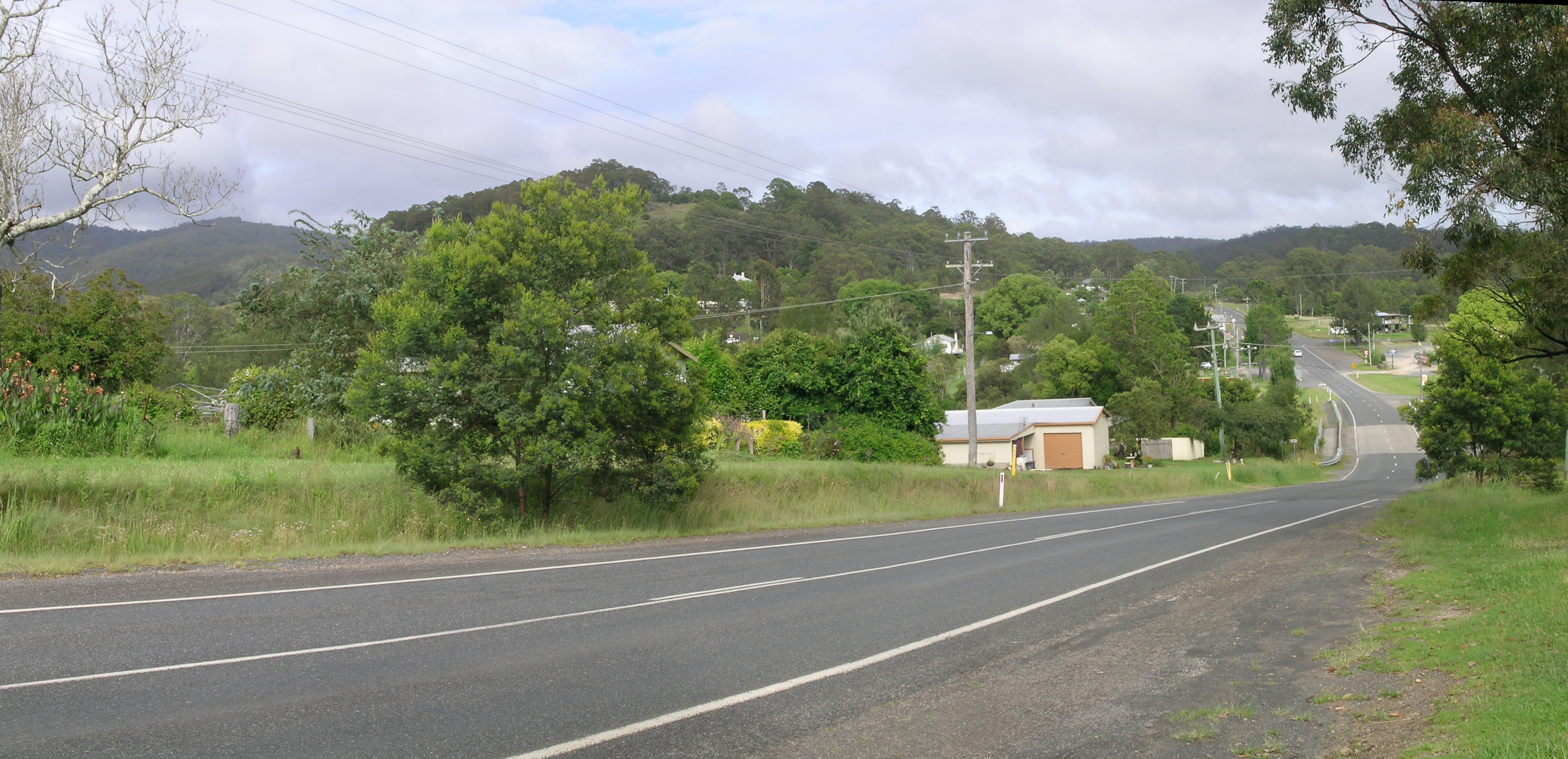
- Bruxner Highway

- Coordinates: 28°56′S 152°24′E
- Country: Australia
- State: New South Wales
- LGA: Tenterfield Shire
- Location: 800 km (500 mi) N of Sydney; 74 km (46 mi) W of Casino; 44 km (27 mi) E of Tenterfield
- Established: 1860s

Government
  - State electorate: Lismore
  - Federal division: New England
- Elevation: 500 m (1,600 ft)

Population
  - Total: 345 (2016 census)
- Postcode: 2469
- County: Drake County

Drake is a parish and small rural community on the Bruxner Highway approximately 44 km east of Tenterfield, New South Wales and about 800 km north of Sydney, New South Wales. It is in the Tenterfield Shire local government area, which is part of the New England region. At the 2016 census, Drake had a population of 345 people.

The town is in West Fairfield Parish of Drake County New South Wales

== History ==
In 1858 gold was discovered near Newmans Pinch, a hill on the western side of Fairfield (now Drake) and Timbarra and quite a few years later copper was also mined in the vicinity.

The Timbarra Post Office opened on 1 November 1858, was renamed Drake in 1867 and closed in 1871. The later Drake office opened on 1 April 1879 and closed in 1985.

During the 1860s the first sale of Drake allotments took place with 16 of the 40 lots being sold. The Public School opened in November 1887.

The Australian Antimony Co. began mining here in 1872, with Drake as their community centre. Between 1872 and 1890 Drake was a thriving mining and timber town with 14 hotels, a town band, and many private dwellings, plus a number of businesses including a blacksmith, post office and stores. A weekly coach run was established to run from Tenterfield to Casino in 1885. The town also served as a stopping point for bullock teams, drovers and settlers passing between inland and coastal regions.

The original police station and house is near the cemetery, but is privately owned. There is a new Rural Transaction & Resource Centre. St Peter the Apostle Anglican Church (former) has been placed on the Register of the National Estate.

The community is agricultural, timber and tourist based providing hiking, fishing and fossicking etc.

== Population ==
In the 2016 Census, there were 345 people in Drake. 70.8% of people were born in Australia and 81.7% of people spoke only English at home. The most common response for religion in Drake was No Religion at 46.5%.
