= County of Churchill, Queensland =

Churchill Queensland
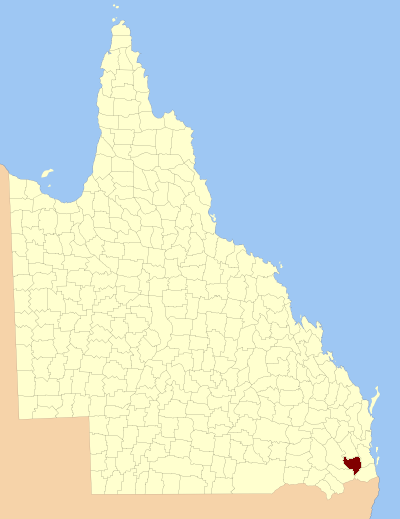
- Location within Queensland
Lands administrative divisions around Churchill:
Aubigny	Cavendish	Stanley
Aubigny	Churchill	Stanley
Merivale	Merivale	Ward

The County of Churchill is a county (a cadastral division) in Queensland, Australia. Like all counties in Queensland, it is a non-functional administrative unit, that is used mainly for the purpose of registering land titles. The county lies between 152°E and 153°E longitude, and is centred on the West Moreton region, extending east to the suburbs of Ipswich. The county was named for Lord Randolph Churchill, who was born in 1849, by the Surveyor-General of New South Wales the following year; the area was officially named and bounded by the Governor in Council on 7 March 1901 under the Land Act 1897.

== Parishes ==
Churchill is divided into parishes, as listed below:

Parish	LGA	Coordinates	Towns
Alfred	Ipswich	27°42′S 152°26′E	Grandchester
Blenheim	Lockyer Valley	27°36′S 152°20′E	Forest Hill, Lawes
Brassall	Ipswich	27°33′S 152°43′E	Brassall, Leichhardt, Pine Mountain
Campbell	Lockyer Valley	27°39′S 152°03′E	Flagstone Creek, Preston
Clumber	Scenic Rim	28°06′S 152°30′E	
Colin	Lockyer Valley	27°43′S 152°02′E	
East Haldon	Lockyer Valley	27°52′S 152°14′E	
Fassifern	Scenic Rim	27°57′S 152°34′E	Aratula, Kalbar
Ferguson	Ipswich	27°42′S 152°31′E	
Flagstone	Lockyer Valley	27°37′S 152°04′E	Middle Ridge, Withcott
Flinders	Scenic Rim	27°47′S 152°42′E	Harrisville
Forbes	Scenic Rim	27°47′S 152°34′E	
Franklin	Ipswich	27°48′S 152°27′E	
Gatton	Lockyer Valley	27°35′S 152°17′E	Gatton
Goolman	Scenic Rim	27°49′S 152°47′E	Peak Crossing
Grandchester	Lockyer Valley	27°37′S 152°30′E	Hatton Vale
Jeebropilly	Ipswich	27°40′S 152°39′E	Amberley
Laidley	Lockyer Valley	27°37′S 152°24′E	Laidley
Mort	Lockyer Valley	27°43′S 152°21′E	
Mutdapilly	Ipswich	27°43′S 152°36′E	Mutdapilly
Normanby	Scenic Rim	27°51′S 152°38′E	Warrill View
North	Somerset	27°28′S 152°39′E	Fernvale
Purga	Ipswich	27°41′S 152°44′E	Churchill, Ripley, Yamanto
Rosevale	Scenic Rim	27°53′S 152°27′E	Rosevale
Rosewood	Lockyer Valley	27°32′S 152°29′E	Glenore Grove
Tarampa	Somerset	27°29′S 152°33′E	Lowood
Taylor	Lockyer Valley	27°31′S 152°01′E	Murphys Creek, Withcott
Tenthill	Lockyer Valley	27°39′S 152°14′E	Lower Tenthill
Terry	Lockyer Valley	27°35′S 152°07′E	
Thorn	Scenic Rim	27°52′S 152°32′E	Rosevale
Thornton	Lockyer Valley	27°48′S 152°21′E	
Townson	Lockyer Valley	27°53′S 152°22′E	
Walloon	Ipswich	27°35′S 152°40′E	Rosewood, Marburg, Minden
Whitestone	Lockyer Valley	27°46′S 152°13′E	

== See also ==
- Lands administrative divisions of Queensland
