= Hernani, New South Wales =

Rual locality of Clarance Valley, News South Wales

Hernani
- Suburb
- Interactive map of Hernani
- Coordinates: 30.17542°S 152.25040°E
- Country: Australia
- State: New South Wales
- Region: Northern Rivers
- LGA: Clarence Valley Council
- Location: 44 km (27 mi) East of Dorrigo; 106 km (66 mi) South of Grafton

Government
  - State electorate: Clarence
  - Federal division: Page

Area
  - Total: 238.9467 km^{2} (92.2578 sq mi)

Population
  - Total: 117 (2021)
  - Density: 0.4896/km^{2} (1.268/sq mi)
- Time zone: UTC+10:00 (AEST)
  - Summer (DST): UTC+11:00 (AEDT)
- Postcode: 2453
- County: FITZROY
- Parish: HERNANI
- Gazetted: 28-06-1996

Hernani is a village that is found in the Northern Rivers region of New South Wales, Australia. It is situated approximately 44 km West of Dorrigo and 106 km South of Grafton.

== Geography ==
Hernani covers an area of 238.9467 square kilometres.

== Transport ==
The locality is accessible from Grafton via Armidale Road Where it ends and joins Waterfall Way. The nearest airport is located by the Coffs Harbour Airport.

== Name ==
Major Edward Parke, an early squatter, named the area after its resemblance of similar landscapes of Hernani in the Spanish Basque province of Commons.

== Schools ==
The Hernani Public School serving the Surrounding location of Hernani it is a primary school established in 1897.

== Demographics ==
At the 2021 census, Hernani had a population of 117 people. At the 2016 census, Hernani recorded a population of 126 people.
