= Elsmore, New South Wales =

Elsmore New South Wales
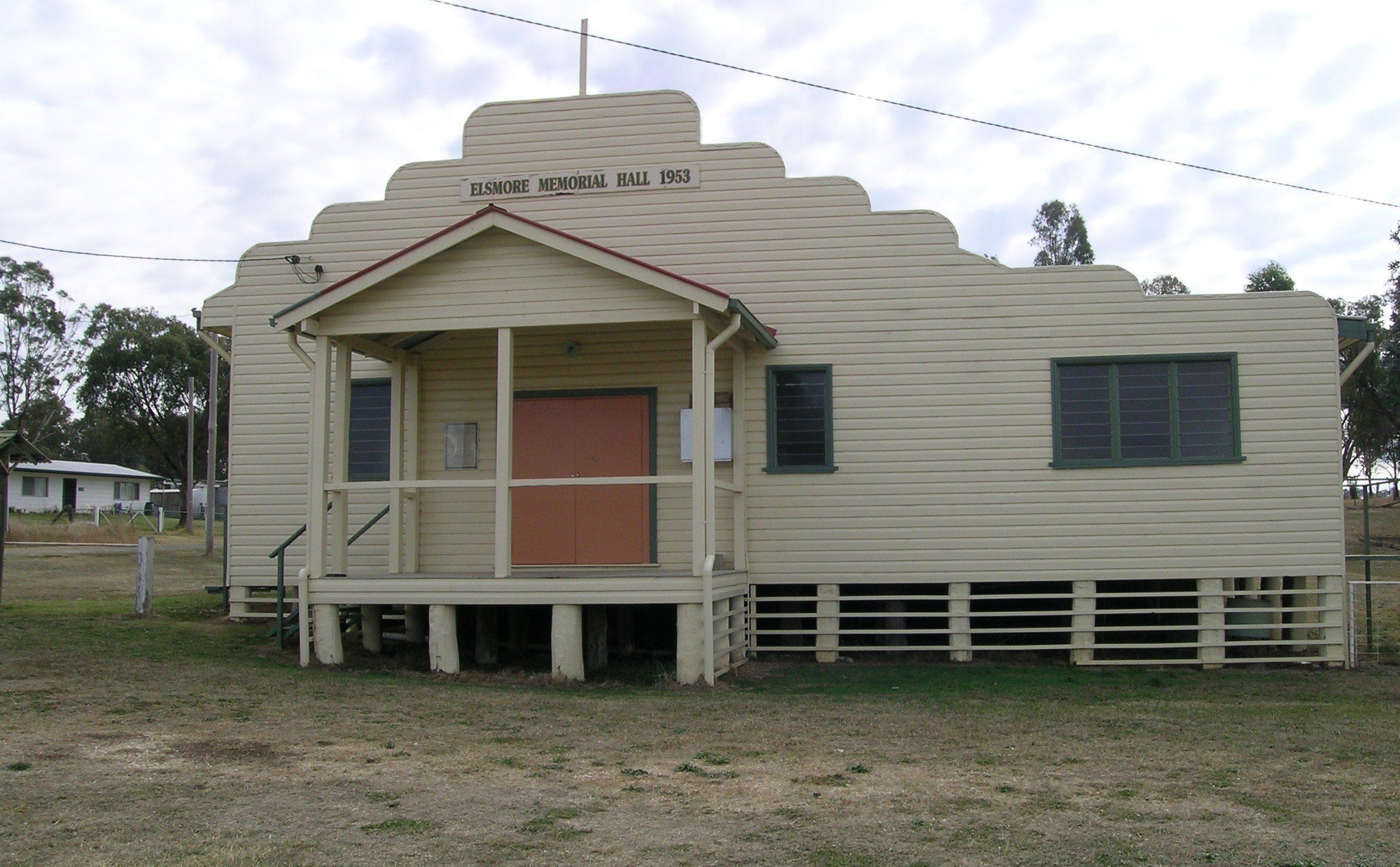
- Community Hall

- Coordinates: 29°48′0″S 151°16′48″E
- Population: 327 (2006 census)
- Established: 1838
- Postcode(s): 2360
- Location: 10 km (6 mi) E of Inverell
- LGA(s): Inverell Shire
- State electorate(s): Northern Tablelands
- Federal division(s): New England

Elsmore is a rural village, with a population of 327 (2006), in Gough County on the Northern Tablelands, New South Wales, Australia. The village is situated 10 km east of Inverell, New South Wales, just north of the Macintyre River and is within Inverell Shire.

== History ==
Elsmore, originally known as Glenmore and also referred to as Ellmore, was a station of approximately 50,000 acres (200 km^{2}) settled by John Campbell in 1838. The first official licensees of this station were Campbell & Muir in 1839. In 1843, the station was owned by Brown & Alcorn. The recorded stock numbers in 1850 included 66 horses, 1,300 cattle, and no sheep. Alexander Campbell of Inverell Station owned Elsmore by 1852.

Around 1870 Joseph Wills, a shepherd, is believed to have been the first to find tin in the New England district. These heavy black grains that he found near Elsmore aroused his curiosity. Shortly after selling these to a traveller from Sydney a rush began to search the tin fields around here, Inverell and other nearby areas. The Elsmore mine was the first commercial tin mine in Australia and has produced tin from various alluvial deposits intermittently since 1871. The adjacent Sheep Station Hill has seen only minor scale hard rock and alluvial mining.

Elsmore Post Office opened on 1 February 1873 and closed in 1992.

The main industries are mining and agriculture.

The Bruderhof started a community known as Danthonia in Elsmore in 1999. They farm, produce signs and operate a publishing house.
