= Clarence County =

Clarence
- Cadastral division
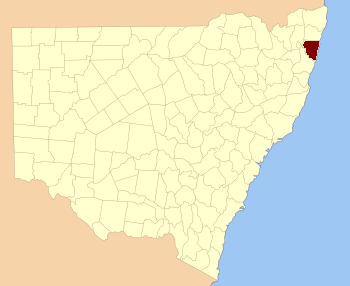
- Location in New South Wales
- Country: Australia
- State: New South Wales
Lands administrative divisions around Clarence
Drake	Richmond	Pacific Ocean
Drake	Clarence	Pacific Ocean
Gresham	Fitzroy	Pacific Ocean

Clarence County is one of the 141 cadastral divisions of New South Wales. It lies to the north of the Orara River, and includes the mouth of the Clarence River, and the city of Grafton.

Clarence County is named in honour of the Duke of Clarence – William IV (1765–1837).

== Parishes within this county ==
A full list of parishes found within this county; their current LGA and mapping coordinates to the approximate centre of each location is as follows:

Parish	LGA	Coordinates
Ashby	Clarence Valley Council	29°24′54″S 153°10′04″E
Banyabba	Clarence Valley Council	29°22′54″S 153°00′04″E
Calamia	Clarence Valley Council	29°50′54″S 153°07′04″E
Candole	Clarence Valley Council	29°41′54″S 153°16′04″E
Canoulam	Clarence Valley Council	29°36′54″S 153°17′04″E
Chapman	Clarence Valley Council	29°31′54″S 152°52′04″E
Clarenza	Clarence Valley Council	29°42′54″S 153°00′04″E
Clifden	Clarence Valley Council	29°31′54″S 152°56′04″E
Coaldale	Clarence Valley Council	29°24′54″S 152°47′04″E
Coldstream	Clarence Valley Council	29°39′54″S 153°10′04″E
Copmanhurst	Clarence Valley Council	29°29′54″S 152°45′04″E
Doubleduke	Clarence Valley Council	29°19′54″S 153°10′04″E
Dundoo	Clarence Valley Council	29°54′54″S 153°07′04″E
Eaton	Clarence Valley Council	29°35′54″S 152°51′04″E
Elland	Clarence Valley Council	29°44′54″S 152°55′04″E
Great Marlow	Clarence Valley Council	29°37′54″S 152°58′04″E
Gulmarrad	Clarence Valley Council	29°31′54″S 153°16′04″E
Harwood	Clarence Valley Council	29°22′54″S 153°16′04″E
Lanitza	Clarence Valley Council	29°47′54″S 153°00′04″E
Lardner	Clarence Valley Council	29°21′54″S 152°53′04″E
Lavadia	Clarence Valley Council	29°44′54″S 153°03′04″E
Lawrence	Clarence Valley Council	29°26′54″S 153°04′04″E
Maryvale	Clarence Valley Council	29°44′54″S 153°08′04″E
Nanegai	Clarence Valley Council	29°21′54″S 153°20′04″E
Qwyarigo	Clarence Valley Council	29°53′54″S 153°00′04″E
Red Rock	Clarence Valley Council	29°55′54″S 153°12′04″E
Richmond	Clarence Valley Council	29°22′54″S 153°05′04″E
Rushforth	Clarence Valley Council	29°41′54″S 152°50′04″E
Scope	Clarence Valley Council	29°46′54″S 153°15′04″E
Southampton	Clarence Valley Council	29°39′54″S 152°53′04″E
Southgate	Clarence Valley Council	29°33′54″S 153°02′04″E
Stuart	Clarence Valley Council	29°28′54″S 152°58′04″E
Taloumbi	Clarence Valley Council	29°26′54″S 153°16′04″E
Tyndale	Clarence Valley Council	29°35′54″S 153°14′04″E
Ulmarra	Clarence Valley Council	29°39′54″S 153°02′04″E
Whiteman	Clarence Valley Council	29°25′54″S 152°52′04″E
Woodford	Clarence Valley Council	29°30′54″S 153°09′04″E
Wooli Wooli	Clarence Valley Council	29°50′54″S 153°30′04″E
Woombah	Clarence Valley Council	29°19′54″S 153°16′04″E
Yamba	Clarence Valley Council	29°31′54″S 153°20′04″E
