= Red Range, New South Wales =

Red Range
- Town
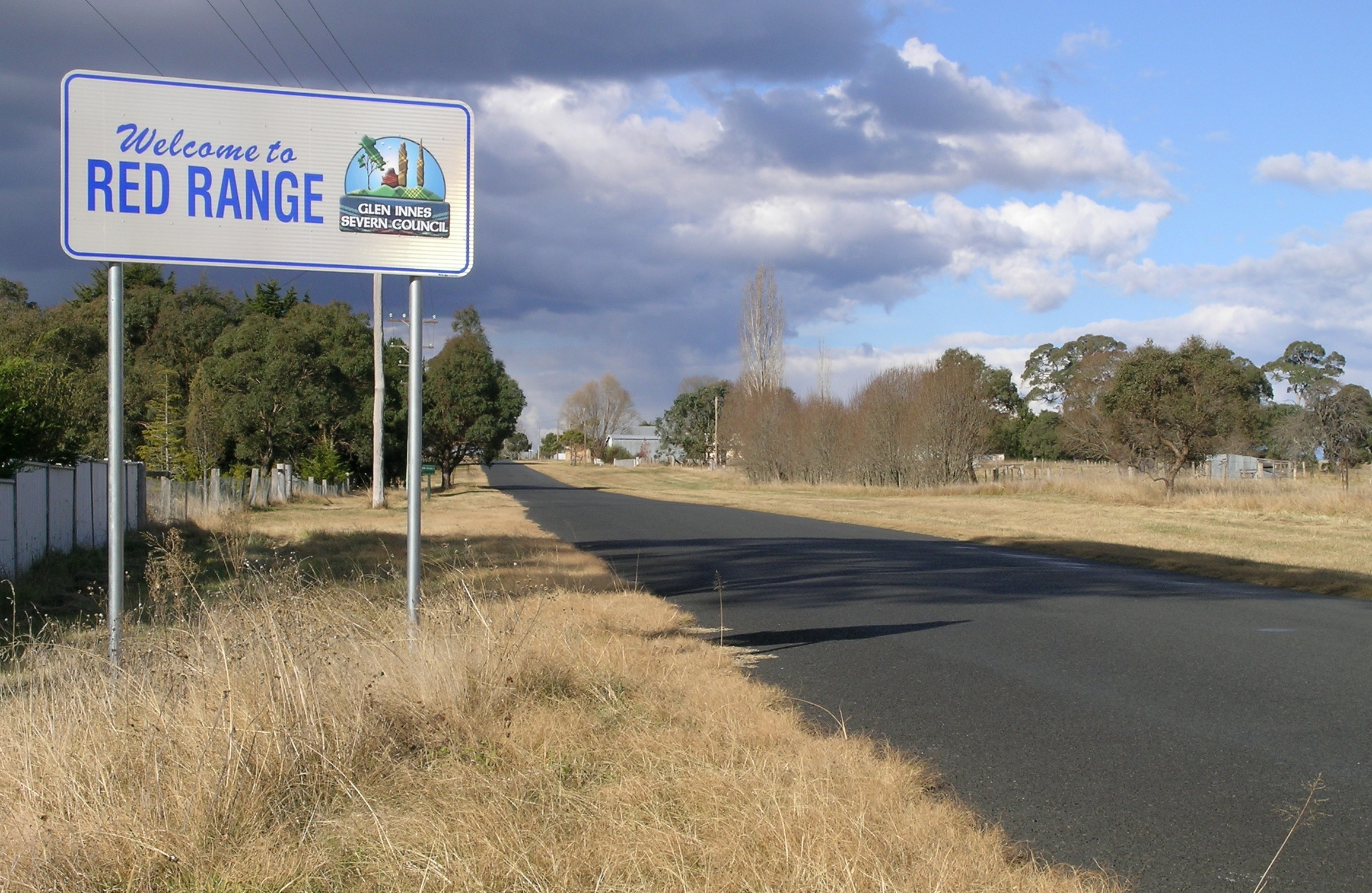
- Red Range, NSW

- Coordinates: 29°46′27″S 151°53′56″E
- Country: Australia
- State: New South Wales
- Region: Northern Tablelands
- LGA: Glen Innes Severn
- Location: 23 km (14 mi) SE of Glen Innes
- Established: 1854
- Elevation: 1,160 m (3,810 ft)

Population
  - Total: 187 (2016 census)
- Postcode: 2370
- County: Gough County

Red Range is a village located on the Red Range Road in the Northern Tablelands region of New South Wales, Australia in Glen Innes Severn Shire.

== History ==
=== Origins ===
Red Range was established in 1854. Four years earlier, George Kempton and his wife Harriet had come to Australia from Ely in Cambridgeshire, England to make a new home for themselves. In 1854 he made his first selection, "Rocky Valley", on the (now) Red Range Road along the Mann River. A few years later, he made a second choice, a block of land he called "Splitters Home" at the site later to become Red Range. Within a few years the village grew to consist of a church, a few houses, a general store and a school, surrounded by peppermint bushes.

The little slab cottage next to the shop was built around this time and was later used to store produce for the shop. The cottage-like appearance is more recent and had resembled a barn for most of its life. It was built of pit-sawn vertical slabs and given a snow roof, typical of the buildings of that time and altitude.

=== First School ===
The first school was opened in 1879 and a weather-board school building was built in 1886. The present school building was opened around 1996 and the old building moved (in two sections) to another part of Red Range for conversion into a residence. Water tanks from the old school building are still in use, having been relocated at the store.

=== Families Associated with Red Range ===
Names associated with Red Range in those early days included (in alphabetical order) Austin, Ballard, Butcher, Cameron, Cave, Chapple, Cheney, Cornish, Drew, Edwards, Enrights, Fenn, Goodwin, Hagen, Hall, Hawker, Hollis, Hottes, Kraemer, Johnson, Lane, Lowe, McCabe, McDonald, Madgwick, Mahoney, Mitchell, Morley, Murphy, Penson, Perkins, Peters, Pogson. Potter, Rainbow, Rogers, Ross, Ruming, Rush, Ryall, Rudd, Scott, Smith, Ted Sargeant, Taylor, Thompson, Tronier, Waimsley, Wells, Whan, Williams, Willis, Wilson, and Winn.

=== Mining ===
In the late 19th century the Kingsgate Mines commenced working in the area with over 60 separate workings scattered over a fairly small area. The mines were originally worked for bismuth and around the turn of the 20th century they became Australia’s principal source of molybdenum. During World War 2 the mines provided limited amounts of piezoelectric quartz for the radio industry.

=== First General Store ===
==== First opening ====
In 1897 Miss Rainbow opened the first general store in the area of the house which forms part of the present shop building. Today, the shop, which was built in the early 20th century, is an extension of the original house. The interior, as with most of the house, is lined with 12x12 "Wunderlich" pressed steel in a fleur-de-lis pattern. The original shop fittings were of dark-stained panelled knotty pine and the shelves were lined with linoleum underlaid with newspapers. The last of these fixtures, the original shop counter, was removed in 1994 because it no longer met with current health department requirements. Newspapers under the linoleum counter-top revealed that it was re-covered in 1926. Previously lost coins, found lodged between the panels, dated from 1921. The present take-away counter, although of a more recent genre, typifies the diverse service provision reminiscent of a comment made in the 1920s regarding the store. A family from Bingara who travelled for two days to Red Range to buy footwear, because of the variety and quality of merchandise offered, used the argument, "If you can buy it in Australia, you can buy it in Red Range!" Red Range's nearest other general store in those days was Hollis's Store at Pinket.

Miss Rainbow was also the first shop-keeper in the present building. Later storeowners included the Wilson family, the Rudds, the Winns and more recently the Broadbent's. In the 1960s the Cooke family purchased the property and the shop-front was partially demolished and converted into a motor garage for the Cooke's Carrying business.

==== Re-opening ====
In 1992 the store re-opened as a second-hand shop by retired Sociologist, Dr. Lionel D. C. Hartley while restoration commenced on the nearby cottage. This little cottage, called "The Mews", then opened as temporary premises for the Red Range Store. The shelves were crowded with general merchandise and groceries, and once again Red Range had its own commercial centre. 1993 saw the commencement of, Council approved, heritage restoration of the old shop-front, using descriptions from local residents. According to one-time shop-keeper at the old Red Range Store, the late Maureen Morgan, the shop originally had a narrow straight-iron verandah which was replaced in (about) 1918 with a bull-nosed frontage. As the restoration included rebuilding the verandah, the earlier design was chosen. The shop also originally had two small doors, which were flush with the street as a front entrance. The indented doorway in the restoration is more in keeping with the period and, like The Mews Cottage, mimics the single door entrance of the original Red Range School-of-Arts (now known as the Red Range Hall) building. Timbers used in the restoration are all local to Red Range: the weather-boards are from the house next door (on the western side) which was built about the same time as the shop; the verandah posts are from the original store; and the roofing timbers are old rafters from parts of the original Red Range Butter Factory. The carport on the western side of the shop is constructed using timbers from the eastern wall of the School of Arts (which was replaced with bricks in December 1994). Restoration was completed by Dr Hartley in 1994 and in 2004 The Red Range Store was sold for wholesale removal to Backwater (Guyra Shire) but continues to trade today, online.

The uniquely contoured façade is original to the building and its design was partially copied by the original School-of-arts which was built next door in 1902. The hitching-post has been re-built using one of the original fence posts from the old shop. Adjacent to the hitching post, under the grass, are concealed a set of steps the full length of the verandah. For reasons of safety these have been left covered over, although senior residents of the village have recollections of sitting on those very steps "eating a pennyworth of conversation lollies" or "smoking a cadged cigarette".

=== Kiln ===
The underground (Newcastle) kiln on the western side of the cottage was constructed using bricks from the fuel storage shed which formed part of the original shop, and behind the cottage the old blacksmith shop has been refurbished. The original fittings were relocated to Red Range Motors in Grafton St in the mid-20th century and are no longer in the village.

The Red Range Store boasted two Glass-Bulb manually operated Petrol Pumps which were installed in the period between the wars. The fuel tanks are still under the footpath in front of the store residence and the cement slabs, where the pumps were, can still be seen. Until his death in the early 1990s, Jack Scott operated the village's second set of petrol pumps at Red Range Motors in Grafton Street, Red Range. The first resident of Red Range to own a motor car is reported to be Mr Jack Lawler Senior, who in 1916 bought one of the first Chevrolet cars to be imported into Australia. Shortly after, Mr W. Marshall, the mine manager at Kingsgate at the time, purchased a model T Ford. A wooden bridge was constructed across the Mann River along the Red Range Road and 1996 saw the closure of this bridge with the opening of a new cement structure named, appropriately, after Mr Jack Lawler Senior.

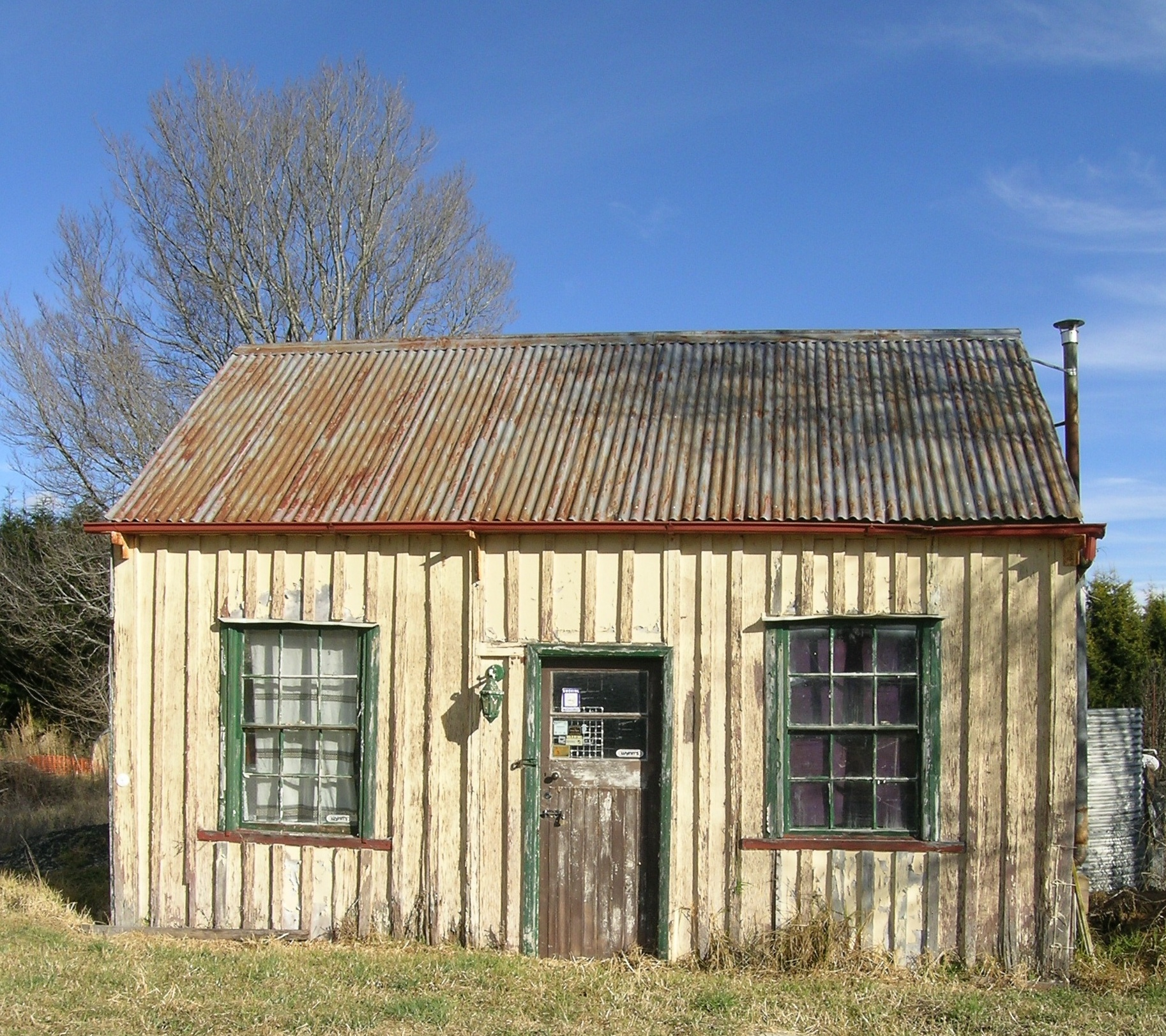
Cottage, Red Range, NSW

=== Improvements in facilities ===
Like the School-of-Arts next door, around 1910 the kerosene lamps lighting the shop were replaced by a gas lighting system, the remains of which are still in existence in the shop attic. Electricity first came to the village in the mid-1950s. The North West County Council organised contractors and excitement built as the official "Switching-on" ceremony was to take place. A dance was organised and the power connected. The night before the official ceremony, however, the transformer supplying the village caught fire and exploded, plunging the village into darkness again. The following morning it was hastily repaired and the official "Switching-on" event took place on April Fool's Day (1 April) 1955. This was performed by two of the oldest residents of the village at that time, Mrs Ryall and Mr George Morley. The dance went ahead as planned, and although the night was remembered as being particularly bleak for that time of year, the old brick fireplaces in the hall were put to good use. (The fireplaces and their chimneys were demolished in 1994 when the eastern wall of the hall was reconstructed in brick.)

The village was then soon dotted with power poles and criss-crossed with wires for both electricity and telephone, however, underground cables for telephones, along with an automatic telephone exchange in the village, saw the last of the multi-wired telephone poles removed in 1995 and only the electricity power poles remain. Although most of the poles taken down were removed from Red Range, the last telegraph pole to be taken down in the village is now a log seat in the market ground behind the store.

=== School of Arts ===
The school-of-arts next to the store was enlarged in the 1920s to cater for the new magic lantern and movie shows. Boasting a reading room and library, a "bobs" (like billiards) area, a large supper room and galley (kitchen). The galley was the congregating place of the children during functions, as the entire family would usually attend. There is still an underground pipe from the artesian well behind the shop (in the market ground) to the water supply for the School-of-arts, however the rainfall at Red Range usually kept the galley in good supply.

The school-of-arts had a post-office built on the North-East corner in a room currently occupied as a Shire Branch (public) Library. The Post Office had previously been located in a building at the far Eastern end of Victoria Street where the road turns into Tablelands (Kingsgate) Road. Postal services are now handled by courier from Glen Innes, although the Red Range Store was licensed as a Stamp Vendor.

In those early days the school-of-arts caretaker was a Danish cartwright called Carl Tronier. Carl had a shed at the rear of the building where he carried out his trade repairing sulkies and buggies, and upholstering and painting vehicles. The School-of-arts is now managed jointly by the Red Range Soldier's Memorial Trust and the Red Range Recreational Trust Sub-management Committee.

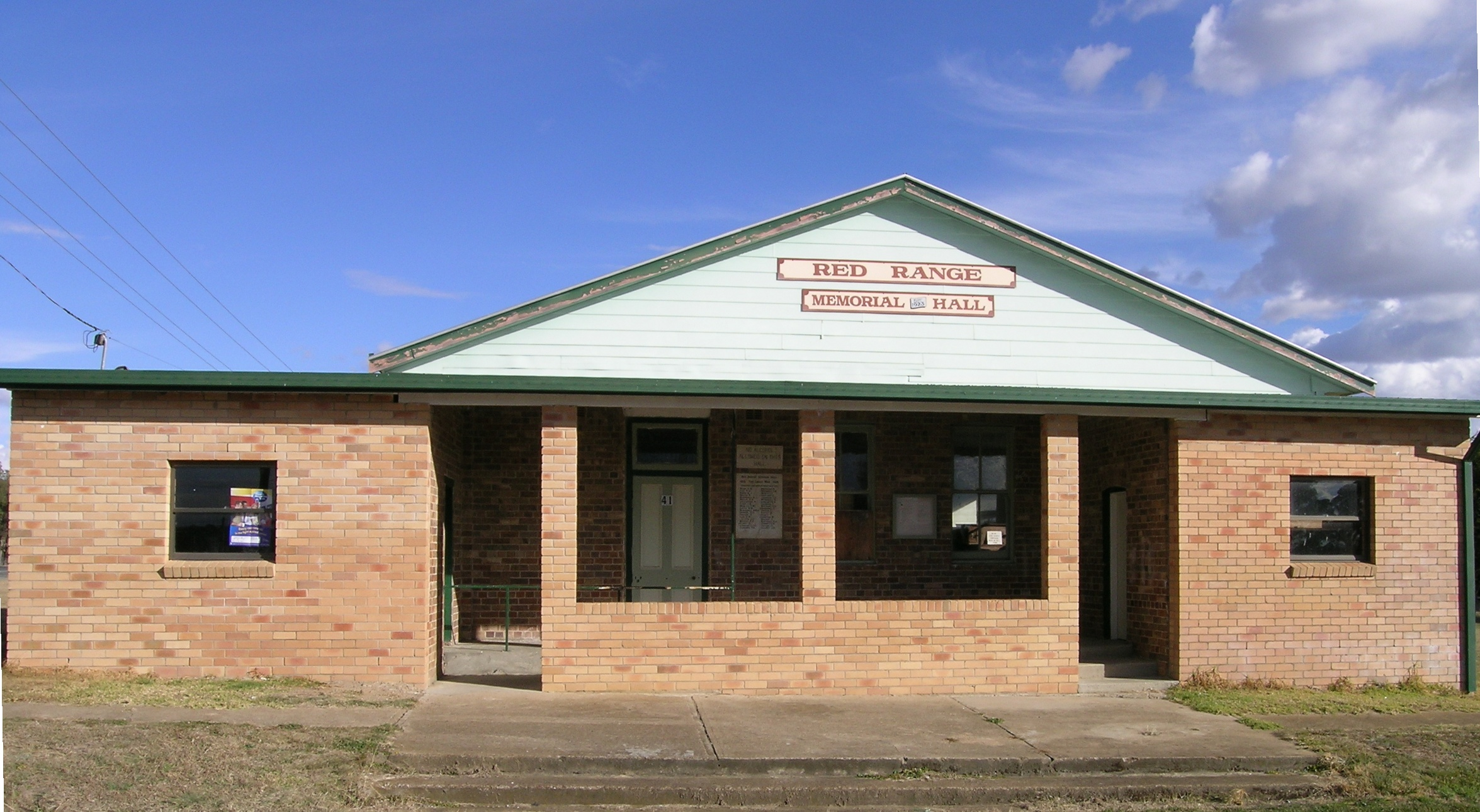
Red Range Memorial Hall

=== Red Range Radio ===
In 1998 preparations were made for the establishment of Red Range Radio, a privately owned 'community' narrow-cast station on 88.5 FM. A full complement of analogue and digital equipment was obtained and set up in the rooms behind the store. However, the licence application, although initially provisionally approved, was refused by the Australian Broadcasting Authority because 'a transmitter in such a strategic mountain location would interfere with local television channels in neighbouring Glen Innes and Grafton.

=== Recreation Ground ===
The recreation ground has an annual sports day and usually a camp draft. Older residents recall that earlier this century there were facilities for cricket, tennis, rugby union football, horse sports, racing, and even a rifle range. Cricket was played against Emmaville, Dundee, Shannonvale, Mount Mitchel and Glencoe (where it was necessary to travel by sulky on Friday night, camp at Lambs Valley, and after the game arrive home in the "wee small hours of Sunday morning"). The horse sports were played west of the school on the furthermost side of Rocky Creek, also the location in those days for the annual School Picnic, which was held on Empire Day each year. (Empire day, 24 May, was the anniversary of Queen Victoria's birthday.)

The recreation ground catered for cricket, football and tennis. Other tennis courts were later located in Victoria Street (further West and opposite the store) and at the school. The Red Range market ground (behind the store) was designated with the approval of the Severn Shire Council in 1994 with the first market on the tenth of October that year.

=== Butter Factory ===
Adjacent to the market ground are to be found the remains of the Red Range butter factory. This facility specialised in the export of butter to Britain and was fed by just under 100 local dairies in its hey-day.

=== First Bakery ===
In 1919, when the Great War was in full momentum, Mr William (Bill) Whan built the first bakery at Red Range. A Mr Wyld was engaged as baker, and Mr Whan (and occasionally his brother Arthur) delivered bread to the village residents and the surrounding areas (E.g. the families working the bismuth & molybdenite mines at Kingsgate and the tin mines at Skeleton Creek) with a covered two-horse cart. The bakery was sold to Matt Williamson when Bill purchased a truck to commence a carrying business. It is thought that the bakery closed in the late nineteen-seventies. It was shortly after this that the Church at Red Range was demolished.

=== Village Church ===
The old village church was one of the first buildings in the village and it has been noted by residents that it boasted some beautifully crafted cedar pews made locally. The Village Church was used mostly by Anglican, Methodist, and Presbyterian ministers, who in the early days came by sulky or rode horses. Portions of the old church have found their way to the Retreat House at the present Kingsgate Mines.
