= Buller County, New South Wales =

Buller New South Wales
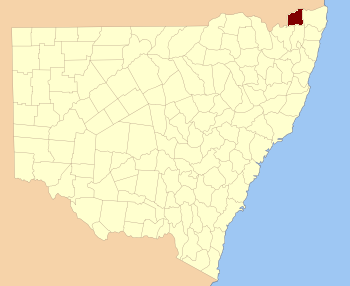
- Location in New South Wales
Lands administrative divisions around Buller:
Merivale (Qld)	Merivale (Qld)	Ward (Qld)
Bentinck (Qld)	Buller	Rous
Clive	Drake	Richmond

Buller County is one of the 141 cadastral divisions of New South Wales.

Buller County was named in honour of Sir George Buller (1802–1884).

== Parishes within this county ==
A full list of parishes found within this county; their current LGA and mapping coordinates to the approximate centre of each location is as follows:

Parish	LGA	Coordinates
Acacia	Tenterfield	28°25′54″S 152°15′04″E
Antimony	Tenterfield	28°51′54″S 152°24′04″E
Beaury	Tenterfield	28°24′54″S 152°29′04″E
Bonalbo	Kyogle	28°26′54″S 152°34′04″E
Bookookoorara	Tenterfield	28°38′54″S 152°15′04″E
Boomi	Kyogle	28°26′54″S 152°39′04″E
Boonoo Boonoo	Tenterfield	28°53′54″S 152°04′04″E
Boorook	Tenterfield	28°46′54″S 152°19′04″E
Buller	Kyogle	28°35′54″S 152°41′04″E
Burgess	Kyogle	28°29′54″S 152°41′04″E
Callanyn	Tenterfield	28°51′54″S 152°20′04″E
Capeen	Kyogle	28°35′54″S 152°36′04″E
Carroll	Tenterfield	28°49′54″S 152°05′04″E
Cataract	Tenterfield	28°40′54″S 152°18′04″E
Clarence	Tenterfield	28°38′54″S 152°20′04″E
Claribell	Kyogle	28°42′54″S 152°30′04″E
Colongon	Tenterfield	28°53′54″S 152°15′04″E
Corry	Tenterfield	28°42′54″S 152°07′04″E
Coutts	Tenterfield	28°27′54″S 152°32′04″E
Cullendore	Tenterfield	28°27′54″S 152°08′04″E
Donaldson	Kyogle	28°21′54″S 152°38′04″E
Ellerslie	Tenterfield	28°43′54″S 152°26′04″E
Emu	Tenterfield	28°48′54″S 152°30′04″E
Evans	Kyogle	28°48′54″S 152°37′04″E
Gilgurry	Tenterfield	28°43′54″S 152°15′04″E
Girard	Tenterfield	28°54′54″S 152°18′04″E
Gore	Tenterfield	28°20′54″S 152°29′04″E
Jenny Lind	Tenterfield	28°46′54″S 152°26′04″E
Kangaroo	Tenterfield	29°33′54″S 152°25′04″E
Kangaroo	Tenterfield	28°29′54″S 152°26′04″E
Koreelah	Tenterfield	28°16′54″S 152°29′04″E
Lindsay	Kyogle	28°26′54″S 152°35′04″E
Mandle	Tenterfield	28°30′54″S 152°20′04″E
Mandle	Tenterfield	28°28′54″S 152°21′04″E
Marsh	Tenterfield	28°29′54″S 152°04′04″E
Maryland	Tenterfield	28°32′54″S 152°00′04″E
Mearimb	Kyogle	28°29′54″S 152°33′04″E
Peacock	Kyogle	28°44′54″S 152°43′04″E
Pocupar	Kyogle	28°40′54″S 152°27′04″E
Reid	Tenterfield	28°37′54″S 152°16′04″E
Robertson	Kyogle	28°41′54″S 152°37′04″E
Ruby	Tenterfield	28°38′54″S 152°02′04″E
Strathspey	Tenterfield	28°38′54″S 152°17′04″E
Tooloom	Kyogle	28°35′54″S 152°30′04″E
Undercliffe	Tenterfield	28°28′54″S 152°11′04″E
Woodenbong	Tenterfield	28°21′54″S 152°35′04″E
Wylie	Tenterfield	28°31′54″S 152°06′04″E
