= Tyringham, New South Wales =

Rual locality of Clarance Valley, News South Wales

Tyringham
- Suburb
- Interactive map of Tyringham
- Coordinates: 30.12542°S 152.32039°E
- Country: Australia
- State: New South Wales
- Region: Northern Rivers
- LGA: Clarence Valley Council
- Location: 30 km (19 mi) East of Dorrigo; 93 km (58 mi) South of Grafton

Government
  - State electorate: Clarence
  - Federal division: Page

Area
  - Total: 84.0171 km^{2} (32.4392 sq mi)

Population
  - Total: 109 (2021)
  - Density: 1.297/km^{2} (3.360/sq mi)
- Time zone: UTC+10:00 (AEST)
  - Summer (DST): UTC+11:00 (AEDT)
- Postcode: 2453
- County: FITZROY
- Parish: TYRINGHAM
- Gazetted: 28-06-1996

Tyringham is a rural locality in the Northern Rivers region of New South Wales, Australia. It is situated approximately 30kms West of Dorrigo and 93kms South of Grafton.

== Geography ==
Tyringham covers an area of 84.0171 square kilometres.

== Demographics ==
At the 2021 census, Tyringham has a population of 109 people. At the 2016 census, Tyringham has a population of 100 people.
