= Stannum, New South Wales =

Stannum
- Town
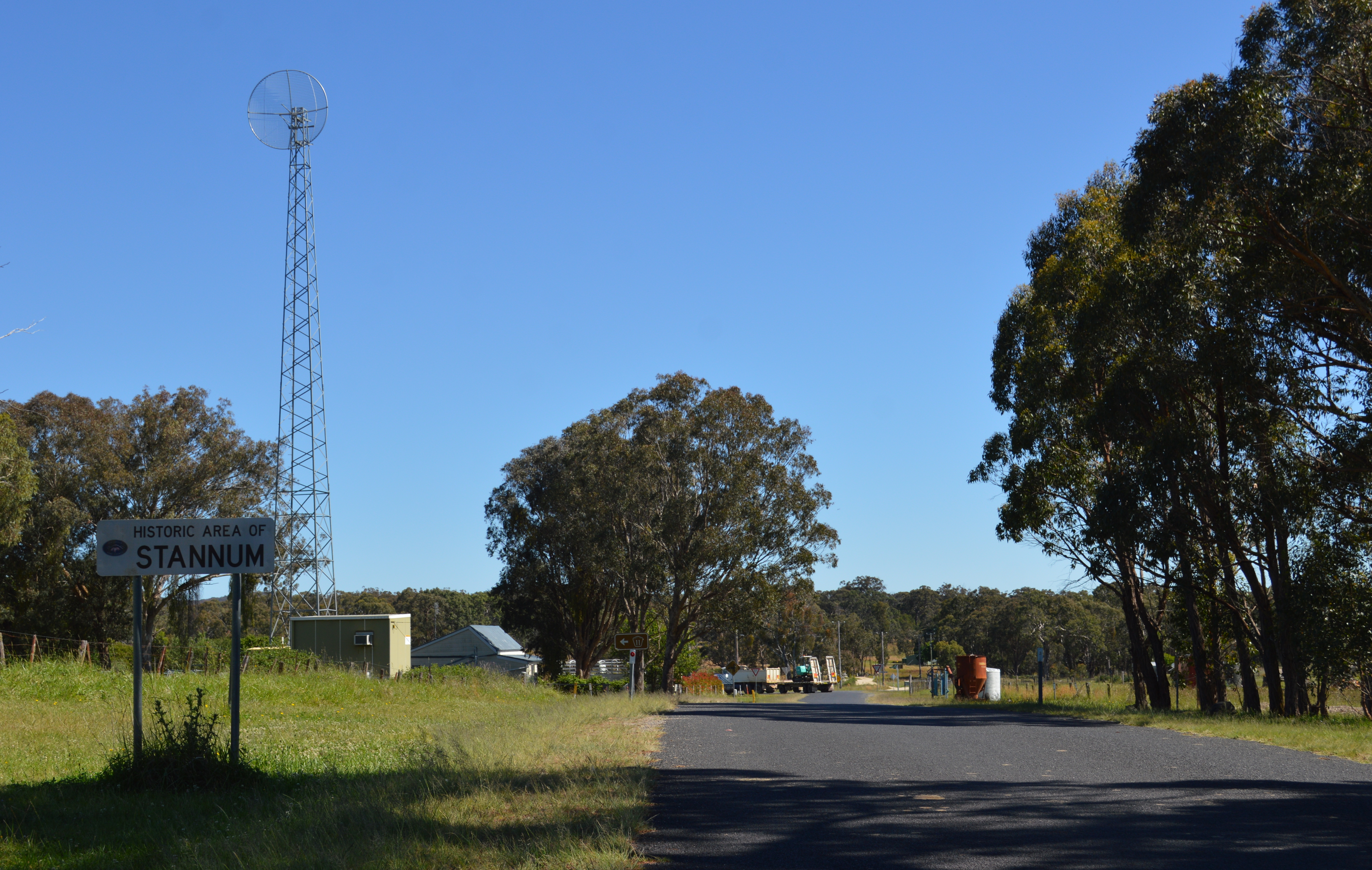
- Entering Stannum, 2017

- Coordinates: 29°19′0″S 151°48′0″E
- Country: Australia
- State: New South Wales
- LGA: Tenterfield Shire
- Location: 655 km (407 mi) N of Sydney; 14 km (8.7 mi) N of Deepwater; 48 km (30 mi) N of Glen Innes

Government
  - State electorate: Lismore
  - Federal division: New England
- Elevation: 1,040 m (3,410 ft)

Population
  - Total: 197 (2006 census)
- Postcode: 2371
- County: Gough
- Parish: Wellington Vale

Stannum is a small tin mining village on the Northern Tablelands, in the New England region of New South Wales, Australia. in Tenterfield Shire. It is 14 kilometres north north-west of Deepwater and south-west of Tenterfield and 48 kilometres from Glen Innes.The village is situated on a plateau known as the Mole Tableland near the Queensland border on the Northern Tablelands. Another tin mining village, Torrington lies 13 kilometres to the west.

The region covers an area of approximately 60,597 hectares or around 606 square kilometres (km^{2}) (149,737 acres).

== History ==
Stannum was formerly known as Nine Mile. Nine Mile Post Office opened on 1 May 1890, was renamed Stannum in 1905 and closed in 1983.

== Demographics ==
In the 2006 census Stannum had a population of approximately 197 (51.3% male, 48.7% female), of which 9 were indigenous persons (comprising Aboriginal and Torres Strait Islanders). Around 54 families live in the area and of those 38.9% have one or more children under the age of 15. Eight percent of families have only a single parent while 46.6% of couples have no children.

The 88 private dwellings in Stannum are owned outright by 45% of their occupiers, 13.6% are being purchased (e.g. by mortgage) and 14% are being rented. On average there are around 2.3 people per private dwelling in the area. The composition of occupied private dwellings in Stannum is as follows: 96.6% separate houses, 0.0% semi-detached houses (e.g. townhouses, row or terrace houses), 0.0% flats (including units and apartments) and 3 other dwellings.

In terms of people aged 15 years or more living in Stannum 50% are married, 18.4% are divorced or separated, 13% are widowed and 26.6% have never married.

Compared to the rest of Australia, Stannum has a below average migrant population, with around 78.2% of residents being born in Australia. The top 5 countries of birth for migrants in the area are: United Kingdom (6.6%), New Zealand (3.0%), Italy (2%), Netherlands (2%) and France (2%).

== Industry ==
The Stannum deep lead tin mine is thought to extend to over 5 kilometres in length. Battery Mountain to the immediate north-west of Stannum has high concentrations of tin bearing veins in this region. Further exploration of the Stannum region is planned to evaluate the possibility of further mining here.

The median weekly family income for people living in Stannum was $616 per week. The main industry of employment for employed persons aged 15 years and over was sheep, beef cattle and grain farming in which 56.9% of the population was employed.

== Fauna ==
The Stannum region is a popular site for bird-watching. Birds that may be seen here include the apostlebird (Struthidea cinerea), channel-billed cuckoo (Scythrops novaehollandiae), dollarbird (Eurystomus orientalis), hooded and eastern yellow robins, Pacific baza (Aviceda subcristata), yellow-tailed black and glossy black cockatoos (Calyptorhynchus lathami), rainbow, musk, and little lorikeets, king and turquoise parrots, rainbow bee-eater (Merops ornatus), restless flycatcher (Myiagra inquieta), white-throated and brown treecreepers (Climacteris picumnus), honeyeaters (including scarlet), diamond, plum-headed and redbrowed finches, tawny frogmouth (Podargus strigoides), and wedge-tailed eagle.
