= Gough County =

Gough New South Wales
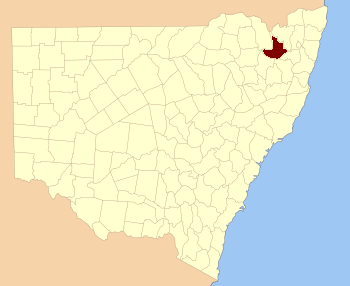
- Location in New South Wales
Lands administrative divisions around Gough:
Arrawatta	Clive	Clive
Arrawatta	Gough	Gresham
Murchison	Hardinge	Clarke

Gough County is one of the 141 cadastral divisions of New South Wales.

Gough County was named in honour of Field Marshal Sir Hugh Gough, first Viscount Gough (1779–1869).

== Parishes ==
A full list of parishes found within this county; their current LGA and mapping coordinates to the approximate centre of each location is as follows:

Parish	LGA	Coordinates
Anderson	Inverell Shire	29°48′54″S 151°18′04″E
Arvid	Glen Innes Severn Council	29°21′54″S 151°29′04″E
Auburn Vale	Inverell Shire	29°44′54″S 151°01′34″E
Balaclava	Inverell Shire	29°47′54″S 151°31′04″E
Bald Nob	Glen Innes Severn Council	29°40′54″S 151°58′04″E
Beardy Plains	Glen Innes Severn Council	29°42′54″S 151°49′04″E
Ben Lomond	Armidale Regional Council	29°59′54″S 151°41′04″E
Blair Hill	Glen Innes Severn Council	29°50′54″S 151°52′04″E
Boyd	Glen Innes Severn Council	29°36′54″S 151°49′04″E
Bundar	Glen Innes Severn Council	29°22′54″S 151°37′04″E
Campbell	Inverell Shire	29°41′54″S 151°12′04″E
Clifton	Glen Innes Severn Council	29°48′54″S 151°40′04″E
Clive	Inverell Shire	29°50′54″S 151°08′04″E
Deepwater	Glen Innes Severn Council	29°29′54″S 151°52′04″E
Diehard	Glen Innes Severn Council	29°40′54″S 152°03′04″E
Ditmas	Glen Innes Severn Council	29°41′54″S 151°39′04″E
Dumaresq	Tenterfield Shire	29°11′54″S 151°24′04″E
Eden	Inverell Shire	29°51′54″S 151°21′04″E
Elsmore	Inverell Shire	29°48′54″S 151°12′04″E
Fladbury	Glen Innes Severn Council	29°31′54″S 151°38′04″E
Flagstone	Tenterfield Shire	29°13′54″S 151°33′04″E
Fletcher	Glen Innes Severn Council	29°51′54″S 151°42′04″E
Glen Innes	Glen Innes Severn Council	29°43′54″S 151°46′04″E
Gordon	Glen Innes Severn Council	29°33′54″S 151°32′04″E
Hamilton	Glen Innes Severn Council	29°25′54″S 151°33′04″E
Herbert	Inverell Shire	29°50′54″S 151°14′04″E
Highland Home	Tenterfield Shire	29°18′54″S 151°41′04″E
Kingsgate	Glen Innes Severn Council	29°45′54″S 151°58′04″E
Lands End	Glen Innes Severn Council	29°16′54″S 151°29′04″E
Llangothlin	Glen Innes Severn Council	29°59′54″S 151°41′04″E
Louis	Glen Innes Severn Council	29°34′54″S 151°46′04″E
Macintyre	Inverell Shire	29°56′54″S 151°35′04″E
Mann	Glen Innes Severn Council	29°42′54″S 152°06′04″E
Marowan	Glen Innes Severn Council	29°51′54″S 151°48′04″E
Mitchell	Glen Innes Severn Council	29°41′54″S 151°55′04″E
Mount Mitchell	Glen Innes Severn Council	29°59′54″S 151°48′04″E
Muir	Tenterfield Shire	29°15′54″S 151°27′04″E
Newstead	Inverell Shire	29°49′54″S 151°23′04″E
Paradise	Inverell Shire	29°54′54″S 151°31′04″E
Paradise North	Glen Innes Severn Council	29°18′54″S 151°34′59″E
Parkes	Glen Innes Severn Council	29°27′54″S 151°58′04″E
Rangers Valley	Glen Innes Severn Council	29°32′54″S 151°47′04″E
Robertson	Glen Innes Severn Council	29°40′54″S 152°09′04″E
Ross	Inverell Shire	29°43′54″S 151°27′04″E
Rusden	Glen Innes Severn Council	29°43′54″S 151°53′04″E
Scone	Glen Innes Severn Council	29°29′54″S 151°36′04″E
Scott	Glen Innes Severn Council	29°31′54″S 152°01′04″E
Severn	Glen Innes Severn Council	29°33′54″S 151°51′04″E
Stonehenge	Glen Innes Severn Council	29°48′54″S 151°43′04″E
Strachan	Glen Innes Severn Council	29°22′54″S 151°42′04″E
Strathbogie	Glen Innes Severn Council	29°29′54″S 151°31′04″E
Strathbogie North	Glen Innes Severn Council	29°23′54″S 151°34′04″E
Swanbrook	Inverell Shire	29°42′54″S 151°17′04″E
Swanvale	Inverell Shire	29°43′54″S 151°22′04″E
Tent Hill	Glen Innes Severn Council	29°25′46″S 151°40′08″E
The Brothers	Glen Innes Severn Council	29°46′54″S 152°05′04″E
Waterloo	Glen Innes Severn Council	29°43′54″S 151°35′04″E
Wellingrove	Glen Innes Severn Council	29°36′54″S 151°34′04″E
Wellington	Glen Innes Severn Council	29°35′54″S 151°39′04″E
Wellington North	Tenterfield Shire	29°17′54″S 151°39′04″E
Wellington Vale	Glen Innes Severn Council	29°23′54″S 151°46′04″E
Yarrow	Glen Innes Severn Council	29°52′54″S 152°00′04″E
Yarrowford	Glen Innes Severn Council	29°36′54″S 151°46′04″E
