= Glen Innes Severn =

- Local government area
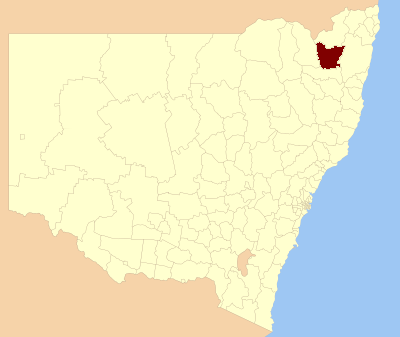
- Location in New South Wales

- Interactive map of Glen Innes Severn
- Coordinates: 29°43′S 151°45′E
- Country: Australia
- State: New South Wales
- Region: New England
- Council seat: Glen Innes

Government
  - Mayor: Margot Davis
  - State electorate: Northern Tablelands

Area
  - Total: 5,487 km^{2} (2,119 sq mi)

Population
  - Totals: 8,836 (2016 census); 8,908 (2018 est.)
  - Density: 1.61035/km^{2} (4.1708/sq mi)
- Website: Glen Innes Severn
LGAs around Glen Innes Severn
Inverell	Tenterfield	Clarence Valley
Inverell	Glen Innes Severn	Clarence Valley
Armidale	Armidale	Clarence Valley

Glen Innes Severn is a local government area in the New England region of New South Wales, Australia. The council serves an area of 5,487 square kilometres (2,119 sq mi) and is located adjacent to the New England Highway. The council was formed by the amalgamation of Severn Shire and Glen Innes City Council.

== Main towns and villages ==
The council area includes the town of Glen Innes and villages including Emmaville, Deepwater, Wellingrove, Glencoe, Stonehenge and Red Range and several hamlets including Diehard, Gibraltar Range, Kingsgate and Wellington Vale.

== Heritage listings ==
The Glenn Innes Servern has a number of heritage-listed sites, including:

- High Conservation Value Old Growth forest

== Demographics ==
At the 2011 census, there were 8,656 people in the Glen Innes Severn local government area, of these 49.5 per cent were male and 50.5 per cent were female. Aboriginal and Torres Strait Islander people made up 5.6 per cent of the population which is approximately double both the national and state averages. The median age of people in the Glen Innes Severn Council area was 46 years; nearly ten years higher than the national median. Children aged 0 – 14 years made up 18.1 per cent of the population and people aged 65 years and over made up 22.0 per cent of the population. Of people in the area aged 15 years and over, 48.7 per cent were married and 14.1 per cent were either divorced or separated.

Population growth in the Glen Innes Severn Council area between the 2001 census, the 2006 census, and the 2011 census was marginal. When compared with total population growth of Australia for the same periods, being 5.78 per cent and 8.32 per cent for each five–year period respectively, population growth in the Glen Innes Severn local government area was significantly lower than the national average. The median weekly income for residents within the Glen Innes Severn Council area was below the national average.

At the 2011 census, the proportion of residents in the Glen Innes Severn local government area who stated their ancestry as Australian or Anglo-Saxon exceeded 92 per cent of all residents (national average was 65.2 per cent). In excess of 69 per cent of all residents in the Glen Innes Severn Council area nominated a religious affiliation with Christianity at the 2011 census, which was significantly higher than the national average of 50.2 per cent. Meanwhile, as at the census date, compared to the national average, households in the Glen Innes Severn local government area had a significantly lower than average proportion (2.7 per cent) where two or more languages are spoken (national average was 20.4 per cent); and a significantly higher proportion (93 per cent) where English only was spoken at home (national average was 76.8 per cent).

Selected historical census data for Glen Innes Severn local government area
Census year		2001	2006	2011
Population	Estimated residents on Census night	8,488	8,780	8,656
Population	LGA rank in terms of size within New South Wales		103rd	96th
Population	% of New South Wales population			0.13%
Population	% of Australian population	0.05%	▼0.04%	0.04%
Cultural and language diversity				
Ancestry, top responses	Australian			34.1%
Ancestry, top responses	English			31.1%
Ancestry, top responses	Irish			9.8%
Ancestry, top responses	Scottish			9.4%
Ancestry, top responses	German			3.9%
Language, top responses (other than English)	Dutch	n/c	0.1%	▲0.2%
Language, top responses (other than English)	German	n/c	0.1%	0.1%
Language, top responses (other than English)	Finnish	n/c	n/c	0.1%
Language, top responses (other than English)	Mandarin	n/c	n/c	▲0.1%
Language, top responses (other than English)	Japanese	n/c	n/c	▼0.1%
Religious affiliation				
Religious affiliation, top responses	Anglican	n/c	37.3%	▼35.5%
Religious affiliation, top responses	Catholic	n/c	22.3%	▼21.8%
Religious affiliation, top responses	No religion	n/c	10.4%	▲14.0%
Religious affiliation, top responses	Uniting Church	n/c	7.6%	▼7.1%
Religious affiliation, top responses	Presbyterian and Reformed	n/c	4.9%	4.9%
Median weekly incomes				
Personal income	Median weekly personal income		A$337	A$395
Personal income	% of Australian median income		72.3%	68.5%
Family income	Median weekly family income		A$765	A$915
Family income	% of Australian median income		65.3%	61.8%
Household income	Median weekly household income		A$613	A$734
Household income	% of Australian median income		59.7%	59.5%

== Council ==
=== Current composition and election method ===
Glen Innes Severn Council is composed of seven councillors elected proportionally as a single ward. All councillors are elected for a fixed four-year term of office. The councillors elect the mayor at the first meeting of the council. The most recent election was held in September 2024, and the makeup of the council is as follows:

Party	Councillors
Independents and unaligned	6
The Greens	1
Total	7

The Council elected in 2024, in order of election, is:

Councillor	Party	Notes
Rob Banham	Independent	
Troy Arandale	Independent	
Tim Alt	Independent	
Carol Sparks	The Greens	Deputy Mayor
Margot Davis	Independent National	Mayor
Max Elphick	Independent	
Andrew Parsons	Independent	

Councillor Rob Banham announced his resignation after the first council meeting from the Glen Innes Severn Council, effective immediately, citing concerns about leadership and a breach of the Council's core values (respect, integrity, courage, honesty, and transparency).

Mr. Banham criticised the current councillors for failing to prioritise the community's needs. "Despite the clear support from the community for our leadership, many of the current councillors have not prioritised the best interests of the community in their decision-making. This lack of alignment between community sentiment and Councillors' actions is troubling," he said.

=== Previous composition and election method ===
This election took place in December 2021, and the council makeup was as follows:

Party	Councillors
Independents and unaligned	6
The Greens	1
Total	7

The Council, elected in 2021, in order of election, is:

Councillor	Party	Notes
Rob Banham	Independent	Mayor
Troy Arandale	Independent	Deputy Mayor
Tim Alt	Independent	
Lara Gresham	Independent	
Carol Sparks	The Greens	
Jack Parry	Independent	
Andrew Parsons	Independent	

== Election results ==
=== 2024 Glen Innes Severn Shire - Preferences Results ===
The following are the results based on the preferences from the Preference Data File

	Preference Vote									
Candidate	1	2	3	4	5	6	7	8	9	10
BANHAM Rob	1555	720	542	462	132	91	71	68	64	71
ARANDALE Troy	822	1272	706	567	131	80	67	59	77	107
ALT Timothy	760	777	746	602	222	135	106	76	53	29
SPARKS Carol	559	321	303	288	80	90	93	108	174	315
DAVIS Margot	444	482	519	645	167	150	177	102	73	93
ELPHICK Max	400	441	611	642	218	182	120	113	55	23
PARSONS Andrew	352	618	710	718	205	141	135	89	94	61
SCOTT David	239	334	522	751	206	195	188	93	88	41
WEATHERALL Elena	162	319	591	463	155	131	146	182	146	80
VOSPER Anne	251	256	287	397	107	124	127	167	204	146

2024 New South Wales local elections: Glen Innes Severn
Party	Candidate	Votes	%	±%
Independent	Rob Banham (elected 1)	1,555	28.0	+8.6
Independent	Troy Arandale (elected 2)	822	14.8	+3.2
Independent	Timothy Alt (elected 3)	760	14.7	+3.6
Greens	Carol Sparks (elected 4)	559	10.1	−1.5
Independent National	Margot Davis (elected 5)	444	8.0	+8.0
Independent	Max Elphick (elected 6)	400	7.2	+7.2
Independent	Andrew Parsons (elected 7)	352	6.3	+0.6
Independent	Anne Vosper	251	4.5	+4.5
Independent National	David Scott	239	4.3	+4.3
Independent	Elena Weatherall	162	2.9	+2.9
Total formal votes		5,544	94.8	−2.4
Informal votes		302	5.2	+2.4
Turnout		5,846	86.5	−3.9

=== 2021 ===
2021 New South Wales local elections: Glen Innes Severn
Party	Candidate	Votes	%	±%
Independent	Rob Banham (elected)	1,066	19.4	
Greens	Carol Sparks (elected)	638	11.6	+2.7
Independent	Troy Arandale (elected)	637	11.6	
Independent	Timothy Alt (elected)	612	11.1	
Independent	Jack Parry (elected)	534	9.7	
Independent	Lara Gresham (elected)	389	7.1	
Independent	Andrew Parsons (elected)	311	5.7	
Independent	Jeff Smith	298	5.4	
Independent	Benjamin Thorpe	223	4.1	
Independent	Richard Moon	207	3.8	
Independent	Dianne Newman	177	3.2	
Independent	Sheryn Nourse	177	3.2	
Independent	Rosemary Curtis	173	3.1	
Independent	David Renn	54	1.0	
Total formal votes		5,496	97.2	
Informal votes		161	2.8	
Turnout		5,657	90.4	

== Past councillors ==
=== 2016−present ===
Year	Councillor	Councillor	Councillor	Councillor	Councillor	Councillor	Councillor
2016	Steve Toms (Ind.)	Andrew Parsons (Ind.)	Colin Price (Ind.)	Dianne Newman (Ind.)	Carol Sparks (Greens)	Jeff Smith (Ind.)	Glenn Frendon (Ind.)
2021	Rob Banham (Ind.)	Andrew Parsons (Ind.)	Troy Arandale (Ind.)	Timothy Alt (Ind.)	Carol Sparks (Greens)	Jack Parry (Ind.)	Lara Gresham (Ind.)
