= Tenterfield Shire =

- Local government area
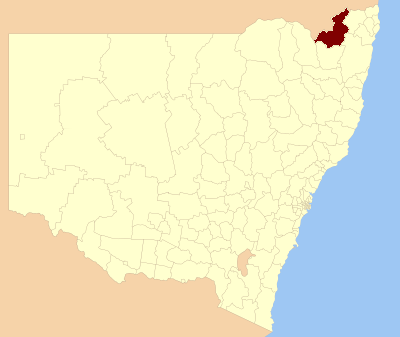
- Location in New South Wales

- Interactive map of Tenterfield Shire
- Coordinates: 29°03′09″S 152°01′07″E
- Country: Australia
- State: New South Wales
- Region: New England
- Council seat: Tenterfield

Government
  - Mayor: Peter Petty (Unaligned)
  - State electorate: Lismore
  - Federal division: New England

Area
  - Total: 7,332 km^{2} (2,831 sq mi)

Population
  - Totals: 6,628 (2016 census); 6,638 (2018 est.)
  - Density: 0.90398/km^{2} (2.3413/sq mi)
- Website: Tenterfield Shire
LGAs around Tenterfield Shire
Southern Downs (Qld)	Southern Downs (Qld)	Kyogle
Inverell	Tenterfield Shire	Kyogle
Glen Innes Severn	Glen Innes Severn	Clarence Valley

Tenterfield Shire is a local government area located in the New England region of New South Wales, Australia. The Shire is situated adjacent to the New England Highway.

The mayor of the Tenterfield Shire Council is Bronwyn Petrie, an unaligned politician.

== Main towns, villages and localities ==
The Shire includes the town of Tenterfield and villages including Drake, Jennings, Liston, Legume, Bolivia, Sandy Flat, Stannum, Torrington, Urbenville and Mingoola. Localities include Amosfield, Boonoo Boonoo, Maryland, Sunnyside and Willsons Downfall.

== Heritage listings ==
The Tenterfield Shire has a number of heritage-listed sites, including:

- High Conservation Value Old Growth forest
- Sunnyside, Main Northern railway: Sunnyside rail bridge over Tenterfield Creek
- Tenterfield, Railway Avenue: Tenterfield railway station
- Tenterfield, Manners Street: Tenterfield School of Arts
- Tenterfield, 225 Rouse Street: Tenterfield Post Office

== Demographics ==
At the 2011 census, there were 6,811 people in the Tenterfield Shire local government area, of these 49.8 per cent were male and 50.2 per cent were female. Aboriginal and Torres Strait Islander people made up 6.8 per cent of the population which is approximately two-and-a-half times above both the national and state averages of 2.5 per cent. The median age of people in the Tenterfield Shire was 47 years; significantly higher than the national median of 37 years. Children aged 0 – 14 years made up 19.0 per cent of the population and people aged 65 years and over made up 20.9 per cent of the population. Of people in the area aged 15 years and over, 50.4 per cent were married and 15.1 per cent were either divorced or separated.

Between the 2001 census and the 2011 census the Tenterfield Shire experienced nominal population growth in both absolute and real terms. When compared with total population growth of Australia for the same periods, being 5.78 per cent and 8.32 per cent respectively, population growth in the Tenterfield Shire local government area was significantly lower than the national average. The median weekly income for residents within the Tenterfield Shire was significantly below the national average; in some cases, nearly half the national average.

Meanwhile, as at the census date, compared to the national average, households in the Tenterfield Shire local government area had a significantly lower than average proportion (3.6 per cent) where two or more languages are spoken (national average was 20.4 per cent); and a significantly higher proportion (92.2 per cent) where English only was spoken at home (national average was 76.8 per cent).

=== Selected historical census data ===
Selected historical census data for Tenterfield Shire local government area
Census year		2001	2006	2011
Population	Estimated residents on Census night	6,363	▲6,534	▲6,811
Population	LGA rank in terms of size within New South Wales		117th	
Population	% of New South Wales population		0.10%	0.10%
Population	% of Australian population	0.03%	0.03%	0.03%
Cultural and language diversity				
Ancestry, top responses	Australian			31.0%
Ancestry, top responses	English			29.9%
Ancestry, top responses	Irish			10.0%
Ancestry, top responses	Scottish			7.9%
Ancestry, top responses	German			5.4%
Language, top responses (other than English)	Italian	0.8%	▼0.7%	▼0.5%
Language, top responses (other than English)	German	0.3%	▲0.4%	0.4%
Language, top responses (other than English)	Bandjalang	n/c	n/c	▲0.2%
Language, top responses (other than English)	French	n/c	▲0.1%	0.1%
Language, top responses (other than English)	Filipino	n/c	n/c	▲0.1%
Religious affiliation				
Religious affiliation, top responses	Anglican	31.5%	▼30.0%	▼27.6%
Religious affiliation, top responses	Catholic	24.3%	▲24.4%	▼23.8%
Religious affiliation, top responses	No Religion	10.6%	▲14.0%	▲17.9%
Religious affiliation, top responses	Uniting Church	8.5%	▼6.9%	▼5.8%
Religious affiliation, top responses	Presbyterian and Reformed	6.0%	▼5.7%	▼5.3%
Median weekly incomes				
Personal income	Median weekly personal income		A$307	A$377
Personal income	% of Australian median personal income		65.9%	▼65.3%
Family income	Median weekly family income		A$695	A$865
Family income	% of Australian median family income		59.4%	▼58.4%
Household income	Median weekly household income		A$583	A$694
Household income	% of Australian median household income		56.8%	▼56.2%

== Council ==
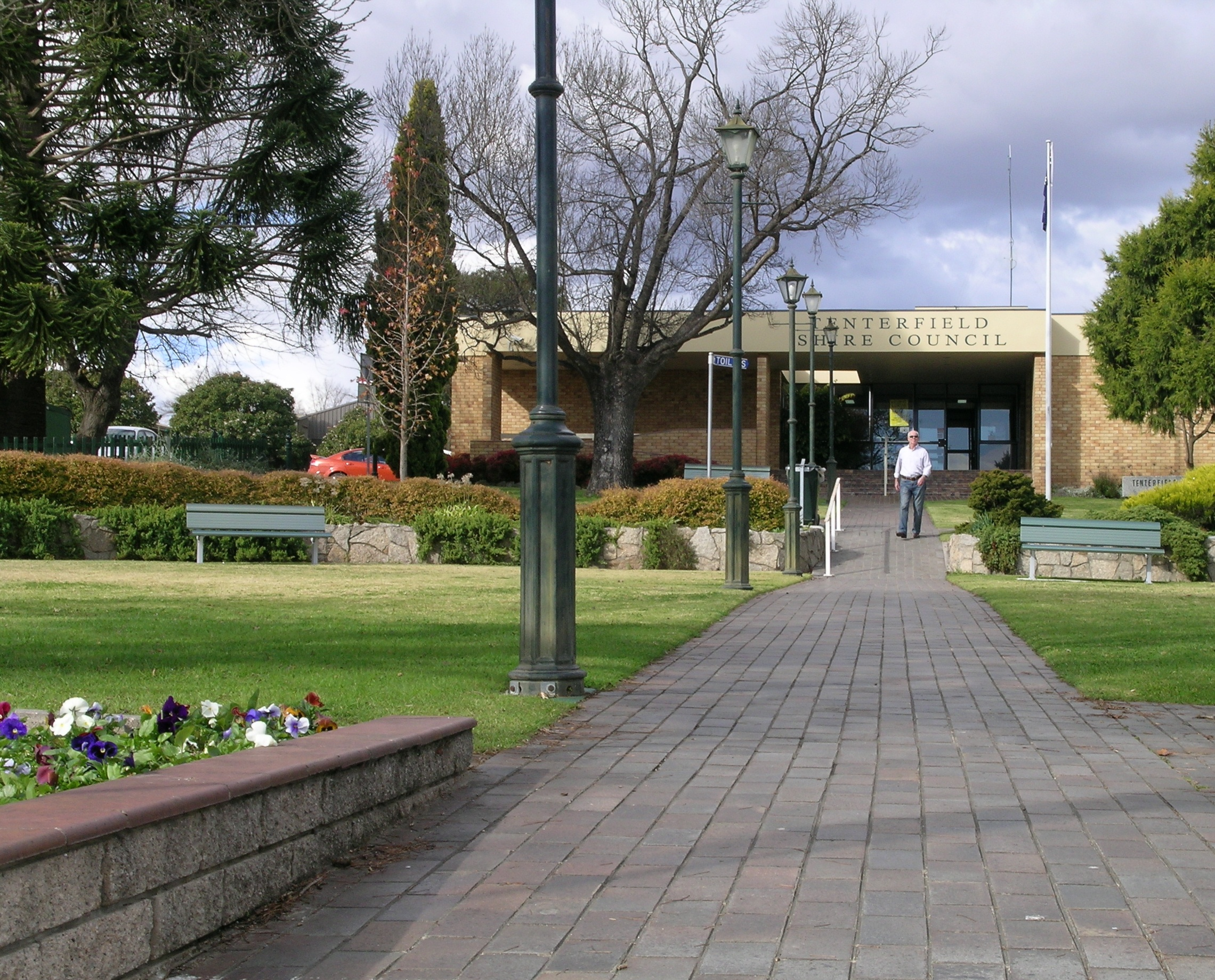
Tenterfield Shire Council, Rouse Street, Tenterfield

=== Current composition and election method ===
Tenterfield Shire Council is composed of ten councillors elected proportionally as five separate wards, each electing two councillors. All councillors are elected for a fixed four-year term of office. The mayor is by the councillors at the first meeting of the council.

== Election results ==
=== 2024 ===
2024 New South Wales local elections: Tenterfield
Party	Votes	%	Swing	Seats	Change
Independents	2,085	70.78		7	
Independent National	861	29.22		2	
Independent United Australia	0	0.00	+0.00	1	▲1
Formal votes	2,946	95.87			
Informal votes	127	4.13			
Total	3,073	100.0			
Registered voters / turnout					
