= Iron Pot Creek, New South Wales =

Iron Pot Creek New South Wales
- Coordinates: 28°38′6.2″S 152°52′4.9″E
- Population: 23 (2021 census)
- Time zone: AEST (UTC+10)
  - Summer (DST): AEDT (UTC+11)
- LGA(s): Kyogle Council
- Region: Northern Rivers
- State electorate(s): Lismore
- Federal division(s): Page

Iron Pot Creek is a locality in the Northern Rivers region of New South Wales, Australia. It sits within the Kyogle Council local government area and is located 36.7 kilometres (22.8 mi) west of Kyogle and it shares a boundary with the Toonumbar National Park. In the 2021 census it had a population of 23 people.

The Traditional owners are the Gullibul, Githabul, Wahlubal and Bundjalung peoples.

The locality also shares its name with a local creek, Iron Pot Creek.
