= Ghinni Ghi, New South Wales =

Ghinni Ghi New South Wales
- Coordinates: 28°36′54.2″S 152°50′3.9″E
- Population: 41 (2021 census)
- Time zone: AEST (UTC+10)
  - Summer (DST): AEDT (UTC+11)
- LGA(s): Kyogle Council
- Region: Northern Rivers
- State electorate(s): Lismore
- Federal division(s): Page

Ghinni Ghi is a locality and village in the Northern Rivers region of New South Wales, Australia. It sits within the Kyogle Council local government area and is located 27.6 kilometres (17.1 mi) west of Kyogle. In the 2021 census it had a population of 41 people.

The Traditional owners are the Gullibul, Githabul, Wahlubal and Bundjalung peoples.
