= Findon Creek, New South Wales =

Findon Creek New South Wales
- Coordinates: 28°21′44.2″S 152°52′48.9″E
- Population: 36 (2021 census)
- Time zone: AEST (UTC+10)
  - Summer (DST): AEDT (UTC+11)
- LGA(s): Kyogle Council
- Region: Northern Rivers
- State electorate(s): Lismore
- Federal division(s): Page

Findon Creek is a locality in the Northern Rivers region of New South Wales, Australia. It sits within the Kyogle Council local government area and is located 34.6 kilometres (21.5 mi) north of Kyogle. In the 2021 census it had a population of 36 people.

The Traditional owners are the Gullibul, Githabul, Wahlubal and Bundjalung peoples.

It shares its name with the Findon Creek which is a perennial stream.
