= Bingeebeebra Creek, New South Wales =

Bingeebeebra Creek New South Wales
- Coordinates: 28°48′35.2″S 152°46′40.9″E
- Population: 39 (2021 census)
- Time zone: AEST (UTC+10)
  - Summer (DST): AEDT (UTC+11)
- LGA(s): Kyogle Council
- Region: Northern Rivers
- State electorate(s): Lismore
- Federal division(s): Page

Bingeebeebra Creek is a village in the Northern Rivers region of New South Wales, Australia. It sits within the Kyogle Council local government area and is located 58 kilometres (36 mi) south-west of Kyogle. In the 2021 census it had a population of 39 people.

The Traditional owners are the Gullibul, Githabul, Wahlubal and Bundjalung peoples.

It shares its name with a nearby creek. On 2 July 1971 it was renamed 'Bingeebeebra' but this was reversed as of 7 April 2000.
