= Bonalbo =

Bonalbo New South Wales
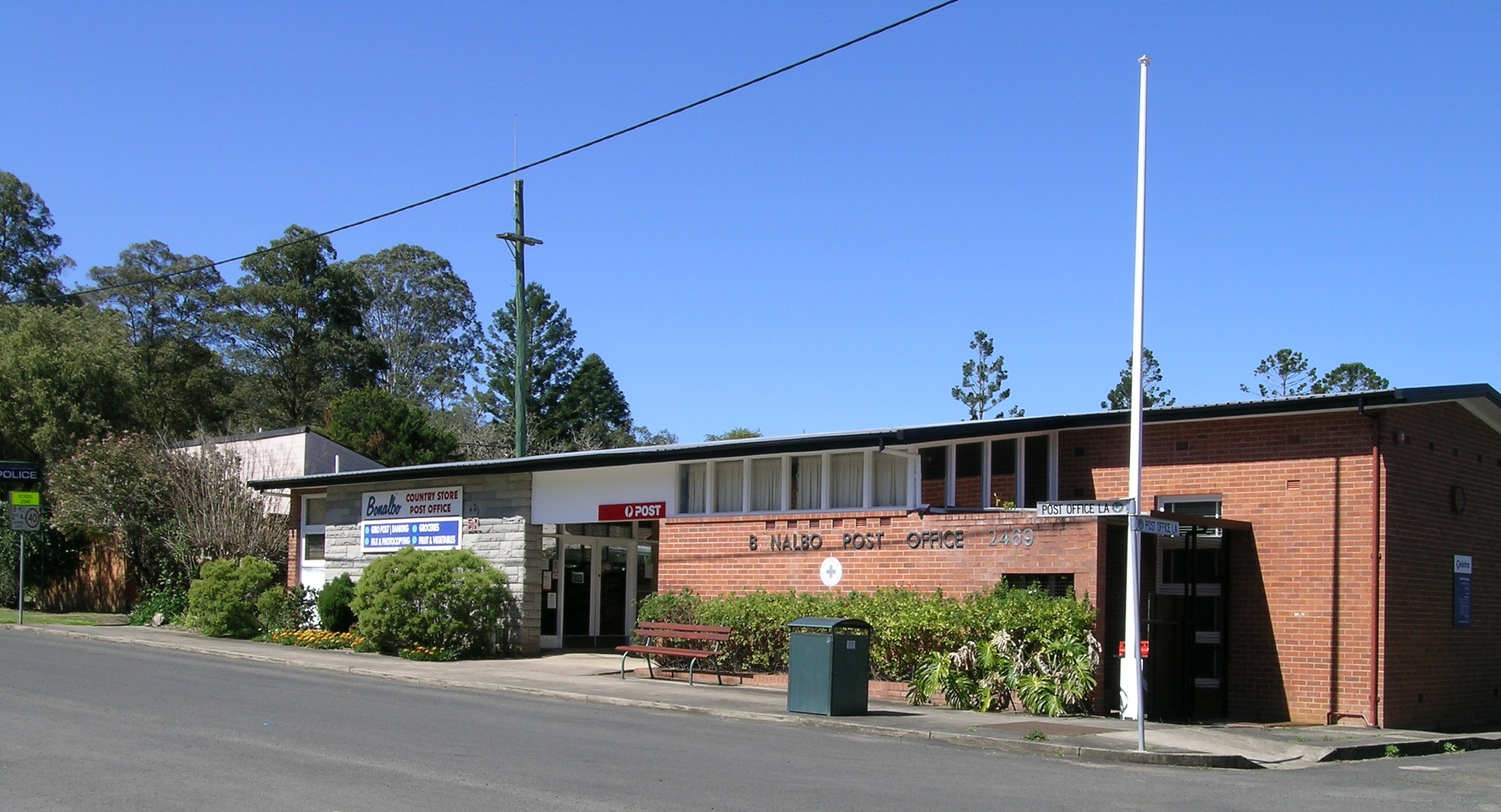
- The police station, general store and post office

- Coordinates: 28°45′0″S 152°37′0″E
- Population: 371 (2016 census)
- Postcode(s): 2469
- Elevation: 171 m (561 ft)
- Location: 815 km (506 mi) NE of Sydney; 190 km (118 mi) SW of Brisbane; 69 km (43 mi) NW of Casino; 98 km (61 mi) ENE of Tenterfield
- LGA(s): Kyogle Council
- State electorate(s): Lismore
- Federal division(s): Page

Bonalbo, a rural village in the Northern Rivers region of New South Wales, Australia, is located 815 kilometres (506 mi) north of Sydney and it is 66 kilometres (41 mi) the regional centre of Kyogle and it sits within the Kyogle Council local government area.

The traditional owners of the district surrounding Bonalbo are the Gidhabal people of the Bundjalung nation.

The town's name derives from the Gidabal word bunawalbu meaning "bloodwood trees".

== European settlement ==
John Donald McLean was the first European to settle in the area. He was a Scotsman who moved his sheep up from the Hunter Valley when the depression hit in 1841. He settled on the 'Bunalbo' or Duck Creek run. Later he became a major landholder and the Queensland treasurer. He sold to the Robertson family in 1853. The Robertson Land Acts of 1861 opened the territories up to free selectors (small landowners) but it was not until 1887 that the first, Donald McIntyre, took up a section of the old station, although the Robertson family had selected various sections themselves, possibly prior to 1880. It was at this time that cedar-getters first moved into the area.

Bonalbo township later developed on a part of McIntyre's holding which fronted on to Peacock Creek. However, the depression of the 1890s drove a number of selectors away, including McIntyre who sold his land to Paddy McNamee. New selectors appeared in the 1900s when McNamee proved the land was arable and when sawmills opened up west of the range. By 1910 there were about 100 selectors in the area living on densely timbered land and with no roads to facilitate access to the wider world. Land was purchased from McNamee and the township was established in 1911 with McNamee building and owning the butcher's shop, hotel and billiard room. He may also have built the post office and hall.

== Proposed railway ==
In the 1920s, a railway branch line was intended to connect Casino with Bonalbo but construction was abandoned due to the advent of the Second World War. Historically the town's economy was supported by dairy farming and the timber industry. However, both the sawmill and milk factory have been closed for several decades.

== Population ==
In the 2016 Census, there were 371 people in Bonalbo. 74.6% of people were born in Australia and 84.5% of people spoke only English at home. The most common response for religion was No Religion at 28.9%.

== Facilities ==
Bonalbo is a very pretty little town, with amenities which are attractive to retirees. The village has a hospital, ambulance station, chemist, supermarket, a Newsagency & service station, a pub with motel rooms, a bowling and recreation club featuring a challenging nine-hole golf course and tennis courts. All amenities are within walking distance of the centre of town. Jacqui Lawrence, a slalom kayaking Olympic Silver medallist, at the 2008 Summer Olympics attended Bonalbo Central School. A bronze statue of a working dog was unveiled in April 2017. The statue marks Bonalbo as the birthplace of working dog trials, using cattle, at the 1950 Bonalbo Show. It also pays tribute to the role played by working dogs in rural life – both as workers and mates. The statue was funded by community contributions and donations from business and government.

== See also ==
- Clarence River
- List of never used railways
- Old Bonalbo, New South Wales
- Tooloom National Park
