= Unumgar, New South Wales =

Unumgar
- Town
- Coordinates: 28°24′34.3″S 152°44′33.9″E
- Country: Australia
- State: New South Wales
- Region: Northern Rivers
- LGA(s): Kyogle Council

Government
  - State electorate(s): Lismore
  - Federal division(s): Page

Population
  - Total(s): 20 (2021 census)
- Time zone: UTC+10 (AEST)
  - Summer (DST): UTC+11 (AEDT)

Unumgar is a locality in the Northern Rivers region of New South Wales, Australia. It sits within the Kyogle Council local government area and is located 41 kilometres (25 mi) north-west of Kyogle. In the 2021 census it had a population of 20 people.

The Traditional owners are the Gullibul, Githabul, Wahlubal and Bundjalung peoples.

The locality of Umumgar shares its name with a local creek, Umumgar Creek and is nearby to the Unumgar State Forest.

== Origin of place name ==
The origin of the name Unumgar is unclear but it was possibly derived from a Bundjalung language word meaning 'a place infested with lizards'; however the Aboriginal people living there when Europeans first colonised were unsure as this name had been given to the area by an earlier tribe.

Another origin is suggested by linguist Margaret Sharpe who has suggested that the name is taken from the word Djurbil which means ritual site (for honey, wattle grub and perch) or water.
