= Green Pigeon, New South Wales =

Green Pigeon New South Wales
- Coordinates: 28°28′54.2″S 153°05′3.9″E
- Population: 176 (2021 census)
- Time zone: AEST (UTC+10)
  - Summer (DST): AEDT (UTC+11)
- LGA(s): Kyogle Council
- Region: Northern Rivers
- State electorate(s): Lismore
- Federal division(s): Page

Green Pigeon is a locality and village in the Northern Rivers region of New South Wales, Australia. It sits within the Kyogle Council local government area and is located 17.3 kilometres (10.7 mi) south-west of Kyogle. In the 2021 census it had a population of 176 people.

The Traditional owners are the Gullibul, Githabul, Wahlubal and Bundjalung peoples.

It shares its name with the Green Pigeon Mountain which sits within the Border Ranges National Park about 2 kilometres (1.2 mi) from the village.
