= Old Bonalbo =

Old Bonalbo New South Wales
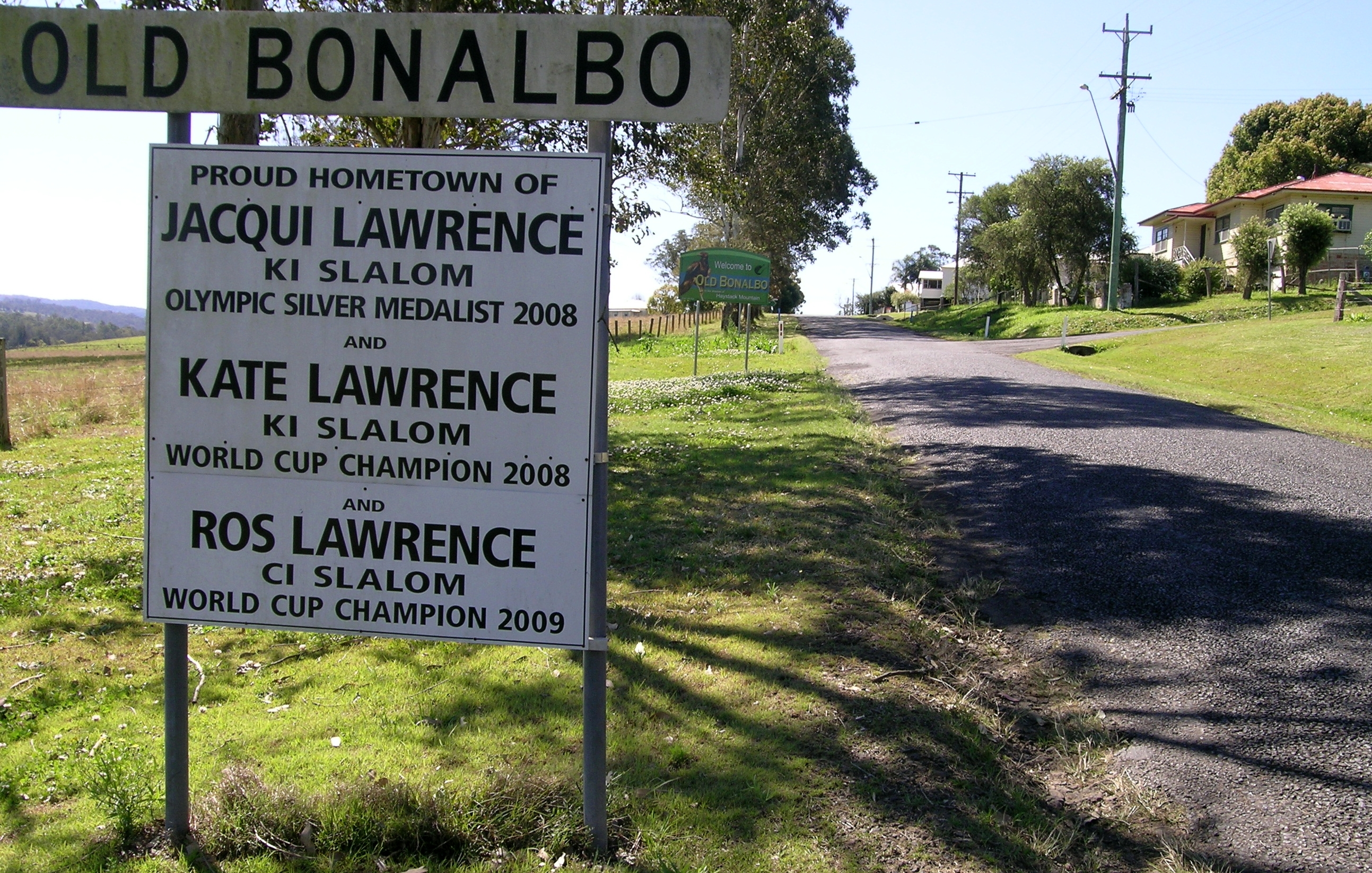
- The entry signs to Old Bonalbo

- Coordinates: 28°39′S 152°36′E
- Population: 273 (2011 census)
- Postcode(s): 2469
- Elevation: 195 m (640 ft)
- Location: 11 km (7 mi) N of Bonalbo; 175 km (109 mi) S of Brisbane; 770 km (478 mi) NE of Sydney
- LGA(s): Kyogle Council
- County: Buller
- State electorate(s): Lismore
- Federal division(s): Page

Old Bonalbo is a rural village located 770 km north of Sydney, near Haystack Mountain in the Northern Rivers region of New South Wales, Australia. It is 97 kilometres (60 mi) from the regional centre of Kyogle and it sits within the Kyogle Council local government area.

The traditional owners of the district surrounding Bonalbo are the Gidhabal people of the Bundjalung nation.

This village is on the Clarence Way between Bonalbo and Urbenville. This was the site of the original Bonalbo, the "Old" was added to its name in the early 1900s when a new settlement also called Bonalbo was built on the banks of Peacock Creek 11 kilometres to the south.

The town's name is likely derived from the Gidabal language word Bunawalbu meaning 'bloodwood trees'.

== History ==
The first European settler in the area was J.D. McLean, a Scots settler who drove his sheep up from the Hunter Region in 1841 when the depression struck. He established the "Bunalbo" or Duck Creek run and later became a major pastoralist and the treasurer of Queensland. The Robertson Land Acts of 1861 opened the territories up to free selectors (small landowners) but it was not until 1887 that the first, Donald McIntyre, took up a section of the old station, although the Robertson family had selected various sections themselves, possibly prior to 1880. It was at this time that Australian red cedar-getters first moved into the area.

The Bonalbo village later developed on a part of McIntyre's holding that fronted onto Peacock Creek. However, the depression of the 1890s drove a number of selectors away, including McIntyre, who sold his land to Paddy McNamee. New selectors appeared in the 1900s when McNamee proved the land was arable and when sawmills opened up west of the range.

== Population ==
In the 1961 census Old Bonalbo had a population of 240 and in 2006 it was recorded as having 281 people resident.

== Notable people ==
- Canoeist family Jacqui, Kate and Ros Lawrence
