= Warrazambil Creek, New South Wales =

Warrazambil Creek New South Wales
- Coordinates: 28°26′30.2″S 153°02′26.9″E
- Population: 19 (2021 census)
- Time zone: AEST (UTC+10)
  - Summer (DST): AEDT (UTC+11)
- LGA(s): Kyogle Council
- Region: Northern Rivers
- State electorate(s): Lismore
- Federal division(s): Page

Warrazambil Creek is a locality in the Northern Rivers region of New South Wales, Australia. It sits within the Kyogle Council local government area and is located 27.2 kilometres (16.9 mi) north of Kyogle. In the 2021 census it had a population of 19 people.

The Traditional owners are the Gullibul, Githabul, Wahlubal and Bundjalung peoples.

It shares its name with the Warrazambil Creek.
