= Tooloom Creek =

Coordinates: 28°35′S 153°29′E

Location
- Country: Australia
- State: New South Wales
- Region: NSW North Coast (IBRA), Northern Rivers
- Local government area: Tenterfield
- Towns: Woodenbong, Urbenville

Physical characteristics
- Source confluence: Lindsay Creek and Grahams Creek
  - location: near Woodenbong
  - elevation: 399 m (1,309 ft)
- Mouth: confluence with the Clarence River
  - location: near Rivertree Peak
  - elevation: 197 m (646 ft)
- Length: 68 km (42 mi)

Basin features
- River system: Clarence River catchment
- Tributaries
  - left: Boomi Creek
  - right: Beaury Creek
- National parks: Tooloom NP, Yabbra NP

The Tooloom Creek, a perennial stream of the Clarence River catchment, is located in the Northern Rivers region in the state of New South Wales, Australia.

== Location and features ==
Formed by the confluence of the Lindsay and Grahams creeks, the Tooloom Creek rises about 1.5 kilometres (0.93 mi) northwest of Woodenbong. The river flows generally south southwest through the Tooloom and Yabbra national parks, joined by two tributaries including Beaury Creek, before reaching its confluence with the Clarence River about 11 kilometres (6.8 mi) southeast of the locality of Rivertree Peak. The river descends 202 metres (663 ft) over its 68 kilometres (42 mi) course.

The Summerland Way crosses the river west of Woodenbong.

== See also ==
- Rivers of New South Wales
- List of rivers of New South Wales (L-Z)
- List of rivers of Australia
