= Tunglebung, New South Wales =

Tunglebung New South Wales
- Coordinates: 28°49′54.2″S 152°40′3.9″E
- Population: 56 (2021 census)
- Time zone: AEST (UTC+10)
  - Summer (DST): AEDT (UTC+11)
- LGA(s): Kyogle Council
- Region: Northern Rivers
- State electorate(s): Lismore
- Federal division(s): Page

Tunglebung is a locality in the Northern Rivers region of New South Wales, Australia. It sits within the Kyogle Council local government area and is located 82.1 kilometres (51.0 mi) south-west of Kyogle and it is 55.5 kilometres (34.5 mi) west of Casino. In the 2021 census it had a population of 42 people.

The Traditional owners are the Gullibul, Githabul, Wahlubal and Bundjalung peoples.

Tunglebung shares its name with a nearby creek 'Tunglebung Creek'.
