= Barkers Vale, New South Wales =

Barkers Vale New South Wales
- Coordinates: 28°32′11.2″S 153°7′13.9″E
- Population: 196 (2021 census)
- Time zone: AEST (UTC+10)
  - Summer (DST): AEDT (UTC+11)
- LGA(s): Kyogle Council
- Region: Northern Rivers
- State electorate(s): Lismore
- Federal division(s): Page

Barkers Vale is a locality in the Northern Rivers region of New South Wales, Australia. It sits within the Kyogle Council local government area and is located 23.5 kilometres (14.6 mi) north-east of Kyogle. In the 2021 census it had a population of 196 people.

The Traditional owners are the Gullibul, Githabul, Wahlubal and Bundjalung peoples.
