= Bean Creek, New South Wales =

Bean Creek New South Wales
- Coordinates: 28°35′19.3″S 152°35′32.9″E
- Population: 56 (2021 census)
- Time zone: AEST (UTC+10)
  - Summer (DST): AEDT (UTC+11)
- LGA(s): Kyogle Council
- Region: Northern Rivers
- State electorate(s): Lismore
- Federal division(s): Page

Bean Creek is a locality in the Northern Rivers region of New South Wales, Australia. It sits within the Kyogle Council local government area and is located 89.8 kilometres (55.8 mi) west of Kyogle. In the 2021 census it had a population of 56 people.

The Traditional owners are the Gullibul, Githabul, Wahlubal and Bundjalung peoples.

The locality of Bean Creek shares its name with a local creek, Bean Creek.
