= Beaury Creek =

Coordinates: 28°28′S 152°30′E

Location
- Country: Australia
- State: New South Wales
- Region: NSW North Coast (IBRA), Northern Rivers
- Local government area: Tenterfield

Physical characteristics
- Source: McPherson Range
  - location: near Woodenbong
  - elevation: 461 m (1,512 ft)
- Mouth: confluence with the Tooloom Creek
  - location: near Tooloom
  - elevation: 341 m (1,119 ft)
- Length: 20 km (12 mi)

Basin features
- River system: Clarence River catchment
- Tributaries
  - right: Boundary Creek (Tenterfield)
- National park: Tooloom NP

The Beaury Creek, a perennial stream of the Clarence River catchment, is located in the Northern Rivers region of New South Wales, Australia.

== Course and features ==
Beaury Creek rises on the southern slopes of the McPherson Range below Bald Knob, about 6.5 kilometres (4.0 mi) west by north of Woodenbong. The river flows generally south southwest, joined by one minor tributary before reaching its confluence with the Tooloom Creek near Tooloom. The river descends 120 metres (390 ft) over its 20 kilometres (12 mi) course.

== See also ==
- Rivers of New South Wales
- List of rivers of New South Wales (A-K)
- List of rivers of Australia
- Tooloom National Park
