= Eden Creek =

Location
- Country: Australia
- State: New South Wales
- Region: South East Queensland (IBRA), Northern Rivers
- Local government area: Kyogle

Physical characteristics
- Source: Richmond Range
  - location: Toonumbar National Park
  - coordinates: 28.47983°S 152.77328°E
  - elevation: 389 m (1,276 ft)
- Mouth: Richmond River
  - location: near Casino
  - coordinates: 28.80172°S 152.97857°E
  - elevation: 28 m (92 ft)
- Length: 65 km (40 mi)

Basin features
- Progression: Richmond → Coral Sea
- Tributaries
  - left: O'Donnell Creek, Wyndham Creek
  - right: Black Horse Creek, Cob O'Corn Creek, Iron Pot Creek, Terrace Creek, Doubtful Creek (Kyogle), Dyraaba Creek
- National park: Toonumbar NP

The Eden Creek, a perennial stream of the Richmond River catchment, is located in Northern Rivers region in the state of New South Wales, Australia.

== Location and features ==
Eden Creek rises below the Richmond Range in remote country within Toonumbar National Park, about 7 kilometres (4.3 mi) southwest of the locality of Grevillia, northwest of Kyogle. The river flows generally east southeast and then south, joined by eight minor tributaries before reaching its confluence with the Richmond River about 10 kilometres (6.2 mi) north northwest of Casino. The river descends 361 metres (1,184 ft) over its 65 kilometres (40 mi) course.

== See also ==
- Rivers of New South Wales
- List of rivers of New South Wales (A-K)
- List of rivers of Australia
