= The Risk railway station =

Former railway station in New South Wales, Australia

The Risk

General information
- Location: Risk Road, The Risk, New South Wales; Australia
- Coordinates: 28°28′48″S 152°56′24″E
- Operator: Public Transport Commission
- Line: North Coast
- Distance: 852.957 km from Central
- Platforms: 1 (1 side)
- Tracks: 2

Construction
- Structure type: Ground

Other information
- Status: Closed

History
- Opened: 28 September 1930
- Closed: 30 June 1974

Services
| Preceding station | Former services | Following station |
|---|---|---|
| Mount Lion towards Brisbane | North Coast Line | The Cape towards Maitland |
Location

The Risk railway station was a railway station on the North Coast railway line, serving the locality of The Risk, New South Wales, Australia. The station opened in 1930 and closed in 1974.
