= Rosalyn Lawrence =

Australian canoeist

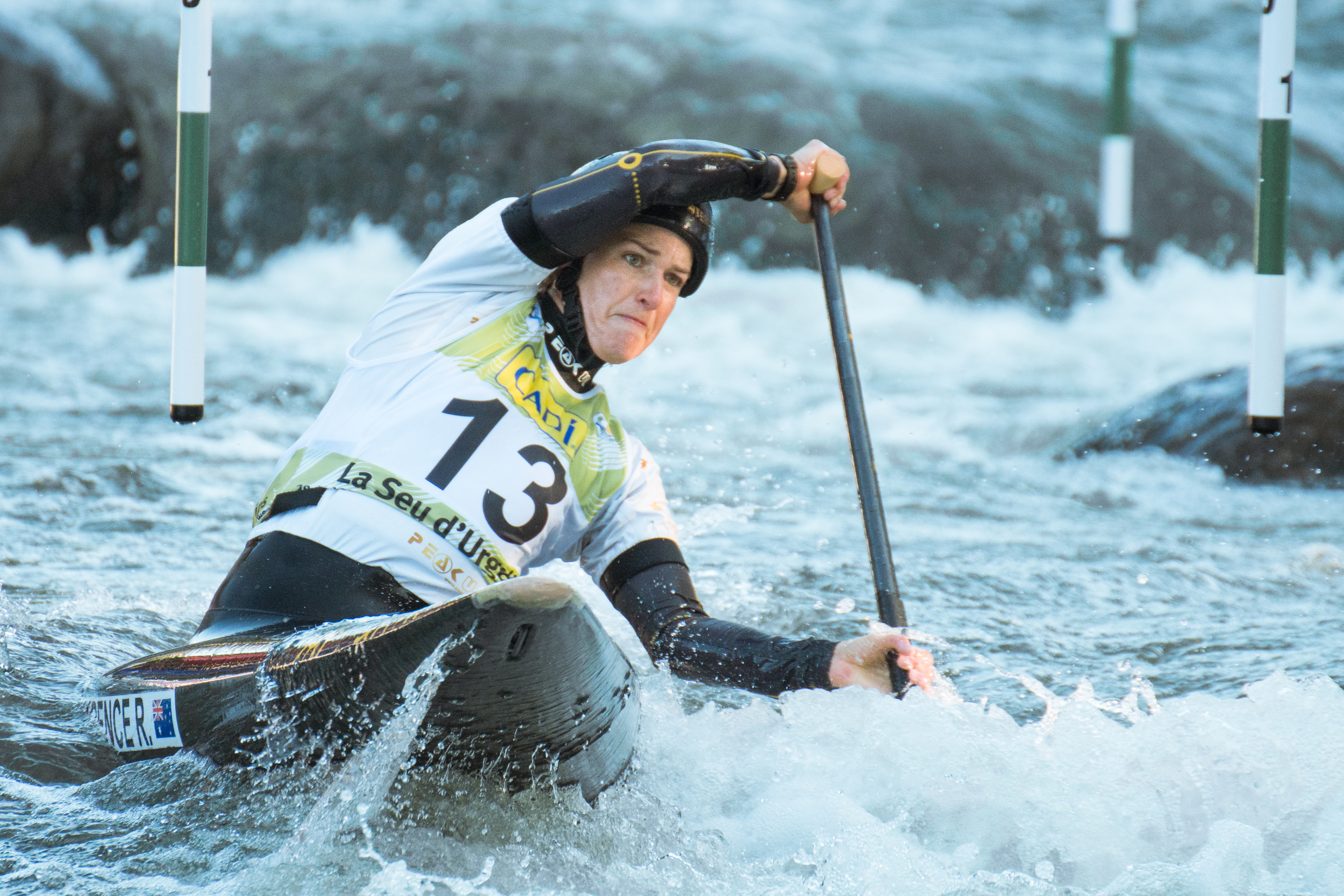
- Lawrence at the 2019 Canoe Slalom World Championships.

Personal information
- Nickname: Ros
- Nationality: Australian
- Born: 12 June 1989 (age 37) Lismore, NSW
- Home town: Old Bonalbo, NSW
- Height: 1.68 m (5 ft 6 in)
- Weight: 55 kg (121 lb)

Sport
- Country: Australia
- Sport: Canoe slalom/extreme kayaking
- Event: C1, K1, Extreme K1
- Club: Big River Canoe Club
- Coached by: Julien Billaut

Achievements and titles
- Highest world ranking: 1st (2012, C1W)
Medal record
Women's canoe slalom
Representing Australia
World Championships
Gold medal – first place	2013 Prague	C1 team
Gold medal – first place	2015 London	C1 team
Gold medal – first place	2019 La Seu d'Urgell	C1 team
Silver medal – second place	2017 Pau	C1 team
Bronze medal – third place	2017 Pau	K1 team
U23 World Championships
Gold medal – first place	2012 Wausau	C1
Gold medal – first place	2012 Wausau	C1 team
Women's Wildwater canoeing
World Championships
Gold medal – first place	2011 Augsburg	C1
- Updated on 26 November 2023

Rosalyn "Ros" Lawrence (born 12 June 1989) is an Australian slalom canoeist who has competed at the international level since 2006. She also competes in wildwater and creeking events.

Lawrence won five medals at the ICF Canoe Slalom World Championships with three golds (C1 team: 2013, 2015, 2019), a silver (C1 team: 2017) and a bronze (K1 team: 2017). She won the overall World Cup title in the C1 category twice (2011 and 2012), as well as in 2009, when it was a demonstration event. Lawrence finished two seasons as the World No. 1 in the C1 event, in 2009 and 2012.

Lawrence also won the Sickline Extreme race in 2012 and the Wildwater World Championship in C1W in 2011.

Her two older sisters have also competed in canoe slalom. Jacqueline Lachmann (née Lawrence) is an Olympic silver medalist (2008 Beijing Olympic Games) and Katrina is the overall world cup champion in K1 from 2008.

== Personal life ==
Lawrence was born on 12 June 1989 in Lismore, NSW, Australia and grew up in Old Bonalbo, a small country town in the Northern Rivers region of NSW. She has been living in Penrith, New South Wales since 2007.

Lawrence completed her HSC in 2006 at Bonalbo Central School and went on to complete a Bachelor of International and Global Studies at the University of Sydney, where she was a scholarship holder in the Sydney Uni Sport and Fitness Elite Athlete Program.

== Canoeing ==
Lawrence races in K1 and C1 events and has been a member of the Australian national canoe/kayak team since 2009. From 2004 to 2006 she was a member of the Australian junior national team and in 2007 & 2012 she competed as a member of the Australian Under 23 team. Lawrence holds a scholarship at the Australian Institute of Sport, and the New South Wales Institute of Sport. Domestically she races for the Big River Canoe Club.

Lawrence was vocal in trying to push for gender equity for her sport to improve by the 2016 Olympics, when there was only one Olympic class available for women in slalom, while there were three for men.

Lawrence was introduced to the sport by her father Laurie, who coached the Bonalbo Central School canoe team.

== World Cup individual podiums ==
	1st place, gold medalist(s)	2nd place, silver medalist(s)	3rd place, bronze medalist(s)	Total
C1	4	4	3	11
K1	0	0	1	1
Total	4	4	4	12

Season	Date	Venue	Position	Event
2009	1 February 2009	Mangahao	3rd	K1^{1}
2011	25 June 2011	Tacen	1st	C1
2011	2 July 2011	L'Argentière-la-Bessée	2nd	C1
2011	9 July 2011	Markkleeberg	3rd	C1
2011	13 August 2011	Prague	1st	C1
2012	9 June 2012	Cardiff	1st	C1
2012	1 September 2012	Bratislava	2nd	C1
2014	21 June 2014	Prague	1st	C1
2014	2 August 2014	La Seu d'Urgell	3rd	C1
2014	16 August 2014	Augsburg	2nd	C1
2017	1 July 2017	Markkleeberg	3rd	C1
2018	31 August 2018	Tacen	2nd	C1

^{1} Oceania Championship counting for World Cup points

== Results ==
=== 2013 ===
1st C1W teams – ICF Canoe Slalom World Championships (Prague, CZE)
2nd C1W – Australian Open (Penrith, NSW)
2nd C1W – Oceania Championships (Mangahao, NZL)
2nd K1W – Oceania Championships (Mangahao, NZL)
1st K1W – National Championships (Eildon, VIC)

=== 2012 ===
1st K1W – Sickline Extreme Kayak race (Oetz, AUT)
World number 1 ranking C1W
Overall C1W Canoe Slalom World Cup Champion
1st C1W – Canoe Slalom World Cup 1 (Cardiff, GBR)
2nd C1W – Canoe Slalom World Cup 5 (Bratislava, SVK)
1st C1W – Canoe Slalom Under 23 World Championships (Wausau, USA)
1st C1W teams – Canoe Slalom Under 23 World Championships (Wausau, USA)
1st C1W – New Zealand Open (Mangahao, NZL)
2nd C1W – Oceania Championships (Penrith, NSW)
2nd C1W – National Championships (Mersey, TAS)
3rd K1W – National Championships (Mersey, TAS)
3rd C1W – Australian Open (Penrith, NSW)

=== 2011 ===
Overall C1W Canoe Slalom World Cup Champion
1st C1W teams – ICF Canoe Slalom World Championships (Bratislava, SVK)
1st C1W – ICF Wildwater Canoe World Championships (Augsburg, GER)
1st C1W – Canoe Slalom World Cup 1 (Tacen, SLO)
1st C1W – Canoe Slalom World Cup 4 (Prague, CZE)
2nd C1W – Canoe Slalom World Cup 2 (L'Argentiere, FRA)
3rd C1W – Canoe Slalom World Cup 3 (Markkleeberg, GER)
2nd K1W – Oceania Open (Penrith, NSW)
3rd C1W – National Championships (Eildon, VIC)
1st C1W – National Championships (Nymboida, NSW)

=== 2009 ===
2nd C1W – World Championship Demonstration Event (La Seu d'Urgell, ESP)
3rd K1W – Australian Open (Penrith, NSW)
2nd C1W – Australian Open (Penrith, NSW)

== Awards ==
2011 International Canoe Federation Athlete of the Month (August)
2011 Australian Canoeing (AC) Athlete of the Year (non-Olympic discipline)
2011 AC Team of the Year (Women's C1)
2011 AC People's Choice Award
2009 AC Canoeist of the Year
2005 NSWCHS blue for canoeing
2005 Pierre de Coubertin Award
