= John Gleeson (cricketer) =

Australian cricketer (1938–2016)

Personal information
- Full name: John William Gleeson
- Born: 14 March 1938; Wiangaree, New South Wales, Australia
- Died: 7 October 2016 (aged 78); Tamworth, New South Wales
- Batting: Right-handed
- Bowling: Legbreak googly

International information
- National side: Australia
- Test debut (cap 242): 23 December 1967 v India
- Last Test: 13 July 1972 v England

Career statistics
Competition	Test	First-class
Matches	29	116
Runs scored	395	1,095
Batting average	10.39	11.06
100s/50s	0/0	0/1
Top score	45	59
Balls bowled	8,857	27,180
Wickets	93	430
Bowling average	36.20	24.95
5 wickets in innings	3	22
10 wickets in match	0	2
Best bowling	5/61	7/52
Catches/stumpings	17/–	58/–
- Source: ESPNcricinfo, 12 March 2024

John William Gleeson (14 March 1938 – 7 October 2016) was an Australian cricketer who played in 29 Test matches from 1967 to 1972. He is best known for his unique bowling style, which according to Cricket Australia CEO James Sutherland "bamboozled batsmen" and could "regularly dumbfound the best batsmen in any team".

== Early years ==
Gleeson was born in the northern NSW town of Wiangaree (14 km north of Kyogle) and grew up in the country town of Tamworth. He was the son of a Wiangaree dairy farmer, and attributed the finger strength required to bowl with his two-fingered grip to his childhood, which he spent milking cows. Aged 15, he worked for the Postmaster-General's Department, and later for Telstra.

== Style ==
He used a grip similar to that of the then unique "bent-finger" action of Jack Iverson, using two fingers: a bent middle finger and the thumb pressing against the ball on both sides in an attempt to find a new variety of bowling tricks. He was one of a small number of Australians who experimented with revolutionary bowling grips in the wake of Iverson's stay in international cricket.

Gleeson preferred to bowl downwind on a greenish surface, since pace from the wicket compensated for his not being a large spinner of the ball. His accuracy resulted in his mainly being used for defensive purposes, rather than an attacking one. Under the old lbw law, batsmen could not be given out if they were struck outside off stump, allowing batsmen to safely use their pads without offering a shot to nullify his googly.

== Career ==
Gleeson was one of the prominent debutants of the 1966–67 Australian cricket season in the Sheffield Shield, taking 23 wickets in six matches.

In the 1966–67 season, he took four wickets in five balls, including a hat-trick, in a Sydney grade game, before taking 5/28 against Victoria. He was subsequently selected in an Australian "Second" team to tour New Zealand at the end of the year. He was selected for the 1967–68 Test series against India in Australia. He made his debut in the First Test at Adelaide Oval, taking 2/36 and 2/38. He managed less success in the remaining three Tests, taking five wickets to end with nine at an average of 28.55. In 1968 he won selection for the Ashes tour of England, playing all five Tests and taking 12 wickets at 34.66.

The 1968–69 season saw a heavy workload for Gleeson, in five Tests against the West Indies cricket team. In the first two Tests he took 13 wickets, including hauls of 5/122 and 5/61, and finished the series with 26 wickets at an average of 32.46. He also peaked in his batting contributions, making his two highest scores of 42* and 45 in consecutive Tests at the Sydney Cricket Ground and the Adelaide Oval. The subsequent 1969–70 tour to India was to be Australia's last Test series win there for 35 years. He took match figures of 7/108 in the First Test at Mumbai, the leading return by an Australian in an eight-wicket victory, but only three wickets in the next four matches, ending the series with ten wickets at 34.70.

In 1969–70, when Australia toured South Africa, Gleeson's value was such that he insured his right hand for A$10,000. Gleeson took 18 wickets in two first-class matches against provincial teams at the start of the tour and then another five in the First Test at Cape Town, and five in the second innings in the Third Test in Johannesburg. Most of the South Africans were seeing him for the first time and struggled to understand his action. It was Barry Richards, the most junior of them, who claimed to have worked him out. Not once in seven innings did Gleeson, who took 19 wickets at 38.94 in the series, dismiss Richards, as South Africa took a 4–0 series win.

Gleeson was the top Australian wicket taker in the 1970–71 Ashes series, but his 14 wickets cost 43.21 as his quest for variety resulted in loose balls and he was punished by the English batsmen who had met him in 1968. Despite being able to use their legs without danger, batsmen were still unable to overcome him during the 1971–72 domestic season when he took 45 wickets at 16.31 in eight matches, including 19 wickets in two consecutive matches. Gleeson was recalled for the 1972 Ashes tour, but was dropped after the first three Tests, in which he managed only three wickets at 52.33. He had minor skills with the bat, with one first-class half-century and a Test top score of 45.

After Gleeson toured South Africa with Derrick Robins' team in 1973–74, Graeme Pollock helped to organise a position for him in the Eastern Province team for his final first class season.

== Later life and death ==
He served on the inaugural governing committee of World Series Cricket. After 40 years of service with Telecom, the Australian telecommunications company, he retired in 1995 as the New South Wales internal communications manager for the firm. Gleeson died on 7 October 2016 in Tamworth. James Sutherland, CEO of Cricket Australia, said that "John captured the imagination of cricket fans everywhere as he bamboozled batsmen with his odd bowling grip, borrowed from another mystery Australian spinner, Jack Iverson." Gleeson is survived by wife Sandra, two sons and two daughters.
