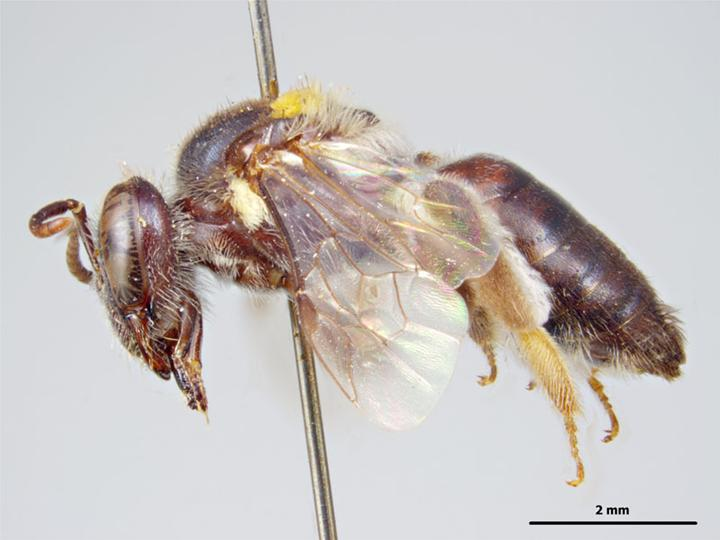
- Female

Scientific classification
- Kingdom: Animalia
- Phylum: Arthropoda
- Clade: Pancrustacea
- Class: Insecta
- Order: Hymenoptera
- Family: Colletidae
- Genus: Leioproctus
- Species: L. bicristatus

Binomial name
- Leioproctus bicristatus (Cockerell, 1929)

Synonyms
- Paracolletes bicristatus Cockerell, 1929; Paracolletes melanurus Cockerell, 1930; Leioproctus (Leioproctus) melanoproctus Michener, 1965

= Leioproctus bicristatus =

Species of bee

Leioproctus bicristatus, or Leioproctus (Leioproctus) bicristatus, is a species of bee in the family Colletidae and subfamily Colletinae. It is endemic to Australia. It was described by British-American entomologist Theodore Dru Alison Cockerell in 1929.

== Description ==
Female body length is about 8 mm. Integumental colouration is mainly black; abdomen faintly greenish; hair is silvery white to dark grey-brown and black.

== Distribution and habitat ==
The species occurs in eastern Australia. The type locality is Tooloom in north-eastern New South Wales.

== Behaviour ==
The adults are solitary flying mellivores that nest gregariously in sand. Flowering plants visited by the bees include Atalaya hemiglauca, as well as Leptospermum and Melaleuca species.

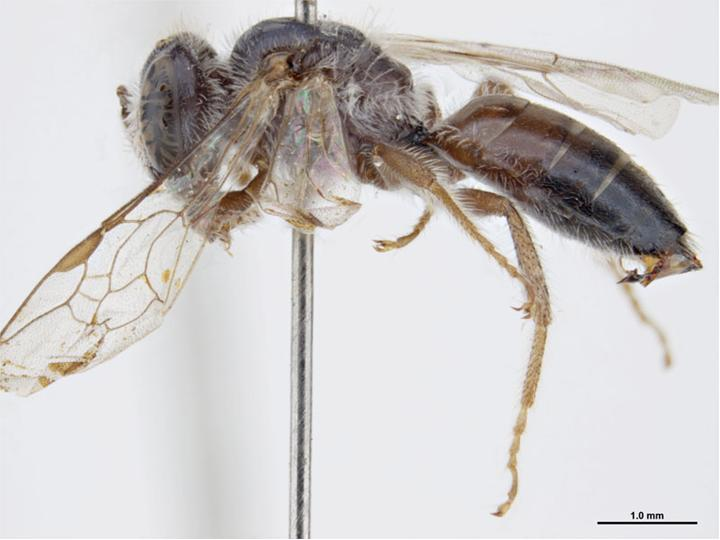
Male
