= Wiangaree =

Wiangaree New South Wales
- Coordinates: 28°30′23″S 152°58′02″E
- Population: 131 (2016 census)
- Postcode(s): 2474
- Location: 760 km (472 mi) NE of Sydney; 149 km (93 mi) S of Brisbane; 111 km (69 mi) SW of Tweed Heads; 14 km (9 mi) N of Kyogle
- LGA(s): Kyogle Council
- State electorate(s): Lismore
- Federal division(s): Page

Wiangaree is a town in northern New South Wales, Australia. The town is 14 kilometres (8.7 mi) north of Kyogle on the Summerland Way. Part of the Northern Rivers region, the town is on the Richmond River. It is administratively part of Kyogle Council.

At the 2006 census, Wiangaree had a population of 129.

John Gleeson (Australian Test Cricketer) was born in Wiangaree.
