= Jacqueline Lawrence =

Jacqueline Lawrence may refer to:

- Jackie Lawrence (politician) (born 1948), British politician
- Jacqueline Lawrence (canoeist) (born 1982), Australian slalom canoeist
