= Grevillia, New South Wales =

Locality in Australia

Grevillia
- Town
- Coordinates: 28.442°S 152.831°E
- Country: Australia
- State: New South Wales
- Region: Northern Rivers
- LGA: Kyogle Council
- Location: 620 km (390 mi) NE of Sydney; 109 km (68 mi) SW of Brisbane; 26 km (16 mi) NW of Kyogle; 61 km (38 mi) NW of Lismore

Government
  - State electorate: Lismore
  - Federal division: Page
- Elevation: 135 m (443 ft)

Population
  - Total: 79 (SAL 2021)
- Postcode: 2474
Localities around Grevillia
Terrance Creek	Terrance Creek	Terrance Creek
Sherwood	Grevillia	Old Grevillia
Roseberry Creek	Roseberry Creek	Rukenvale

Grevillia is a locality within Kyogle Council of New South Wales, Australia. At the 2021 census, Grevillia had a population of 79. The locality sits on the Richmond river. A small creek, Gorge creek, rises in the west of the locality and flows into the Richmond river as a tributary.

The locality was named Grevillia by early settlers due to the surrounding area containing a large amount of silky oak trees (Grevillea robusta). Grevillia was dominated by the lumber industry during the mid to late 19th century. The prominent timber company Munro & Lever was based in Grevillia, and operated a sawmill there until it was destroyed by a fire in 1929. Logging operations continued in Grevillia until 1943.

A primary school, Grevillia Public School, served the local area from 1922 but was closed in 2010, as only 2 students were seeking enrolment at the start of the 2011 school year.
