= Bean Creek =

Bean Creek may refer to:

- Bean Creek, New South Wales, a locality in the Northern Rivers
- Bean Creek (Zayante Creek tributary), a stream in California
- Bean Creek (Salt River tributary), a stream in Missouri
