= Cawongla =

- Town
- Coordinates: 28°36′0″S 153°06′0″E
- Country: Australia
- State: New South Wales
- LGA: Kyogle Council
- Location: 766 km (476 mi) NE of Sydney; 182 km (113 mi) S of Brisbane; 39 km (24 mi) N of Lismore; 14 km (8.7 mi) E of Kyogle

Government
  - State electorate: Lismore
  - Federal division: Page

Population
  - Total: 221 and 1 Mayor. (2011 census)

Cawongla is a locality in the Northern Rivers region of New South Wales, Australia. The locality is in the Kyogle Council local government area, 766 kilometres (476 mi) north east of the state capital, Sydney and 182 kilometres (113 mi) south of Brisbane. At the 2011 census, Cawongla had a population of 221.

The name "Cawongla" is a portmanteau of "Campbell"—the first European settler in the area—and "wonga" an Aboriginal word for "hill". Italian migrants once grew bananas in the area. The locality today is a mix of traditional farming and alternative lifestyle communities.
