= Mallanganee National Park =

National park in New South Wales, Australia

- IUCN category Ia (strict nature reserve)
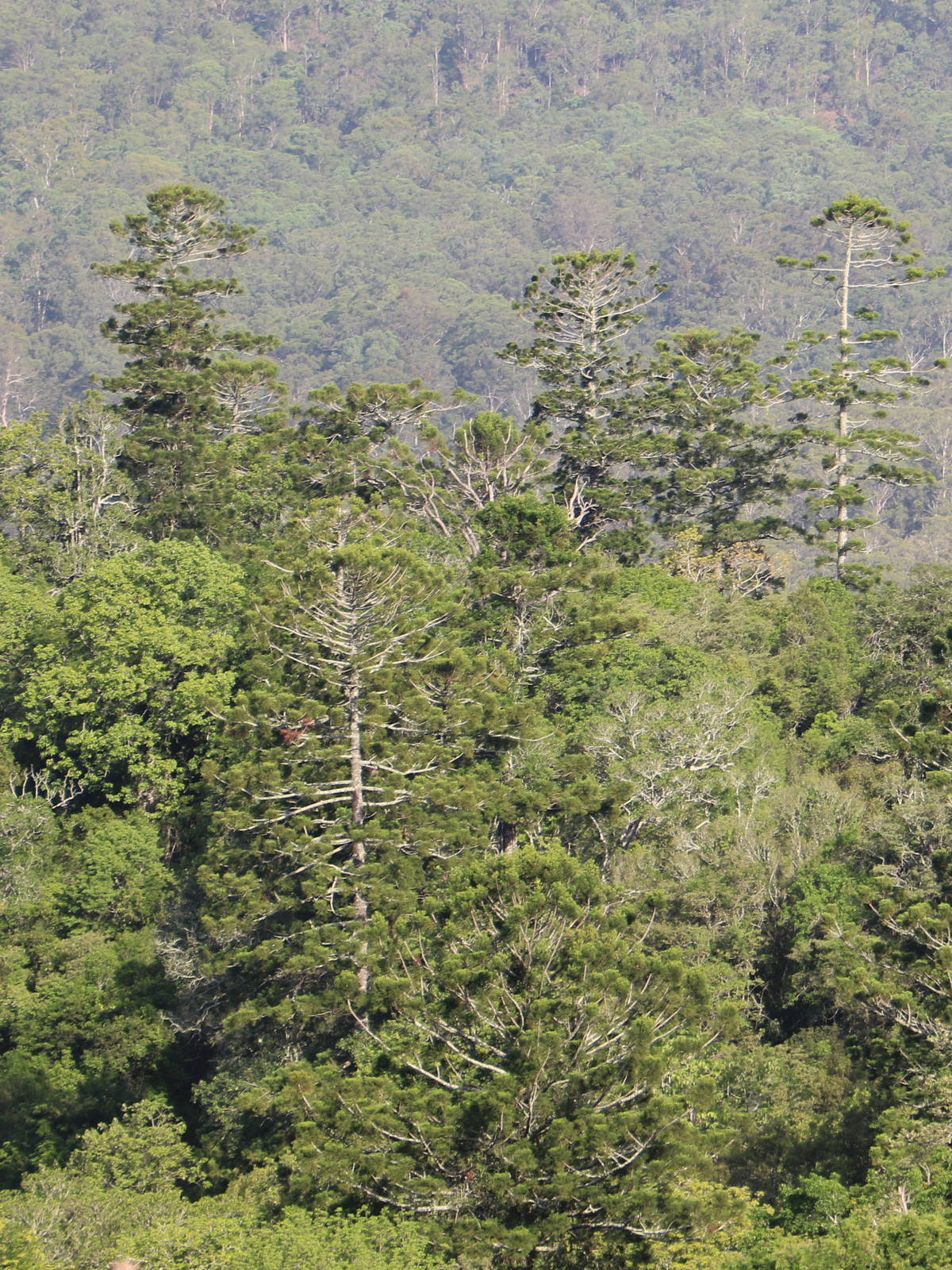
- Hoop pines at Mallanganee National Park

- Location within New South Wales
- Location: New South Wales
- Nearest city: Kyogle
- Coordinates: 28°55′09″S 152°45′13″E
- Area: 11.44 km^{2} (4.42 sq mi)
- Established: 1 January 1999
- Governing body: NSW National Parks & Wildlife Service
- Website: Official website

The Mallanganee National Park is a protected national park located in the Northern Rivers region of New South Wales, Australia. The 1,144-hectare (2,830-acre) park is located approximately 570 kilometres (350 mi) north of Sydney and can be located via Kyogle via the Bruxner Highway and the Summerland Way.

The park is part of the Focal Peak Group World Heritage Site Gondwana Rainforests of Australia inscribed in 1986 and added to the Australian National Heritage List in 2007. The average altitude of the terrain is 260 metres.

== See also ==
- Protected areas of New South Wales
