= Githabul language =

Australian Aboriginal language

Githabul
- Condamine–Upper Clarence Bandjalang
- githabul
- Native to: Australia
- Region: Queensland, New South Wales
- Ethnicity: Githabul, Kalibal, Geynyan
- Native speakers: 4 (2016 census)
- Language family: Pama-Nyungan: Southeastern; North Coast; Bandjalangic; Githabul
- Dialects: Githabul; Gullibul †; Dinggabul

Language codes
- ISO 639-3: gih
- Glottolog: cond1242
- AIATSIS: E14 Githabul, E16.1 Dinggabal, E15 Galibal, D36 Geynyan
- ELP: Githabul
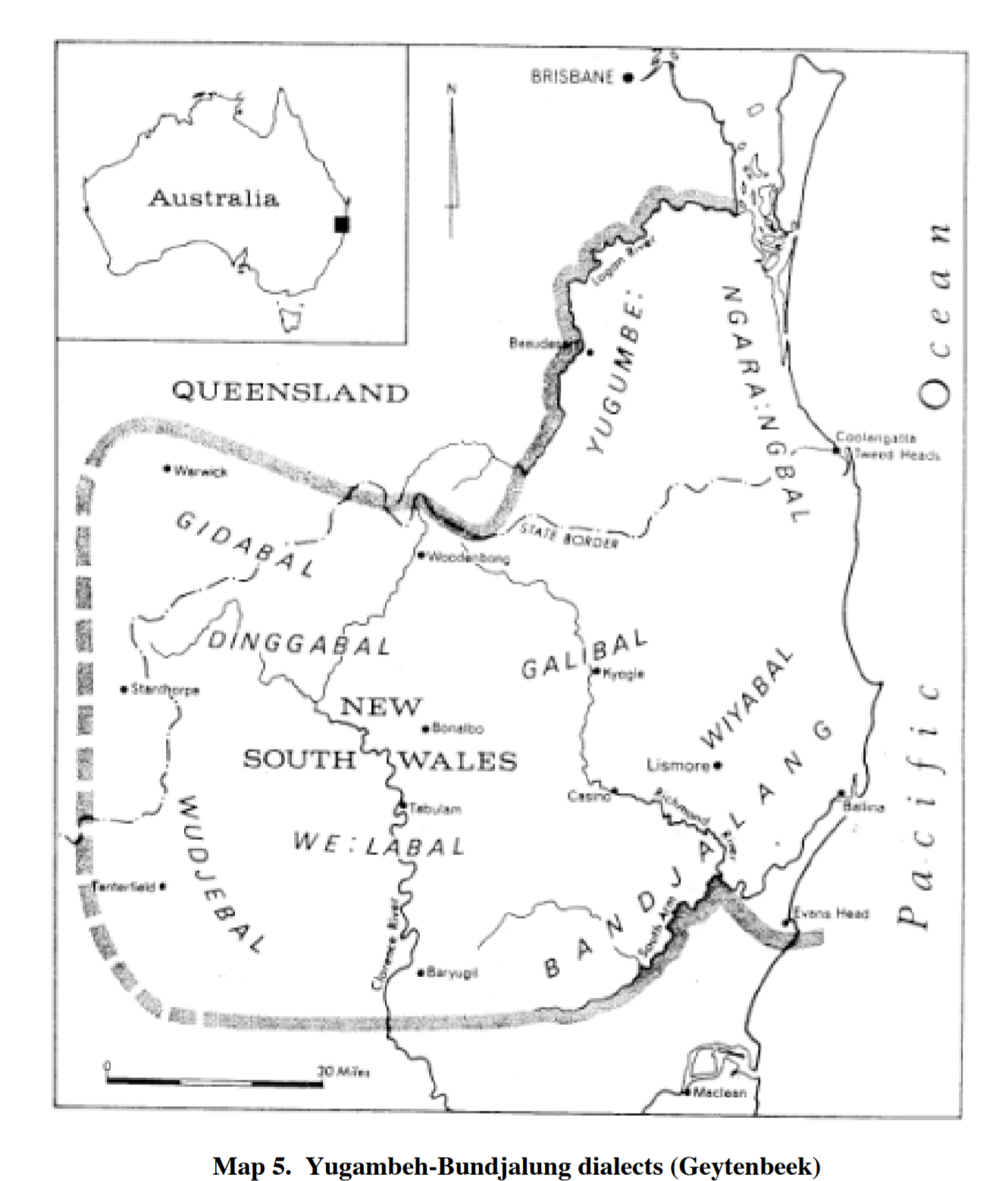
- A map of the vairities and their locales as described by Githabul people at Woodenbong

Githabul, also known as Galibal, Dinggabal, and Condamine – Upper Clarence Bandjalang, is an Australian Aboriginal language spoken by the Githabul living in South Queensland and North-East New South Wales.

== Nomenclature ==
In the Githabul language, the word githabul means 'those who say githa'; githa means 'that's right' and is a common exonym and endonym for the people and their language.

Githabul specifically refers to the language as spoken around Woodenbong, while the southern variety spoken near Drake was known as Dingabal which means 'those who say dinga', with dinga meaning 'that's right'.

The eastern variety spoken near Kyogle on the Richmond river used the term galibal which meant 'those who say gali'; gali means 'this' and contrasts with Githabul and Dinggabal which used gale.

== Phonology ==
=== Consonants ===
	Peripheral		Laminal	Apical
	Labial	Velar	Palatal	Alveolar
Plosive	b	ɡ	ɟ	d
Nasal	m	ŋ	ɲ	n
Rhotic				ɾ
Lateral				l
Approximant	w		j	

=== Vowels ===
	Front	Back
Close	i iː	u uː
Mid	e eː	
Open	a aː	

== Morphology ==
=== Verbs ===
Verbs are conjugated with the use of suffixes. It is an aspect-dominant language, as opposed to tense-dominant like English. Githabul suffixes mostly conjugate for aspect and mood.

==== Suffixes ====
Verb suffixes are placed in six orders. A verb may not take more than one suffix from an order, and similar to nouns, suffixes are attached in a set order. Combinations of these suffixes express all possible conjugations of Githabul verbs, with only a small number of combinations possible. Githabul verb stems are commonly two syllables in length and always end in a vowel.

Orders
1	2	3	4	5	6
-ba 'causative'	-ndi 'Carry whilst...'	-li 'reflexive/passive'	-ja 'Past tense'	-hn 'imperfective aspect'	-du 'habitual mood'
			-wa 'repetitive'	-hny 'imminent aspect'	-i 'preconditional'
			-ma 'causative'	-h 'imperative'	-de 'preconditional'
				-hla 'continuous aspect'	
				-nah 'antechronous aspect'	
				-nyun 'synchronous aspect'	
				-yah 'purposive'	
				-jin 'synchronous aspect'	
				-n 'permissive'	
				-ni 'perfective'	

=== Adjectives ===
Adjectives can be marked with a suffix to indicate the gender of the noun they qualify. Githabul has one of the most extensive gender systems of all the Bandjalangic languages.

==== Suffixes ====
Adjective suffixes
Gender	Suffix
Animate (male)	-gali
Animate (female) - weak quality	-gan
Animate (female) - strong quality	-galigan
Animate (female) - size	-Nahgan
Arboreal	-Nahn*
Neuter	-gay

*N stands for a homorganic nasal.

=== Demonstratives ===
Githabul possesses a complicated set of demonstratives that make a three-way distinction, with proximal, medial, and distal sets. There is a further distinguishing of demonstrative adjectives and location demonstratives. The adjective set can be additionally suffixed to create demonstrative pronouns. The adjective set has three forms for "things in sight", "things hidden or not in sight" and "things not there anymore", while the location set has forms to indicate the general area and definite area, whether in sight or not in sight, and past and present forms.

==== Adjective set ====
Demonstrative Adjectives
Demonstratives	Proximal (this)	Medial (that)	Distal (that over there)
In sight (sg)*	gale	male	gile
In sight (plrl)	gahnyu	mahnyu	gahmu
Not in sight (sg)	gunah	munah	gahba
Not in sight (plrl)	ganyeh	manyeh	gahnye

- The Galibal dialect uses the forms Gali, Mali and Gili.

The above set can be suffixed with order 7 noun suffixes to form demonstrative pronouns that function like ordinary independent nouns. e.g. Yanindeh galeni wangahbaya! 'Take this with you!

The 'not in sight' and 'not here anymore' forms can take the order 2 noun suffix -gan to form time words. E.g gunahgan 'recently'.

==== Location set ====
Demonstratives	Proximal (here)	Medial (there)	Distal (over there)
In sight (definite area)	gaji	maji	gah
In sight (general area)	gunu	munu	gundeh
Not in sight (present)	gayu	mayu	guhyu
Not in sight (past)	gaye	maye	gahye
