= Jack Iverson =

Australian cricketer

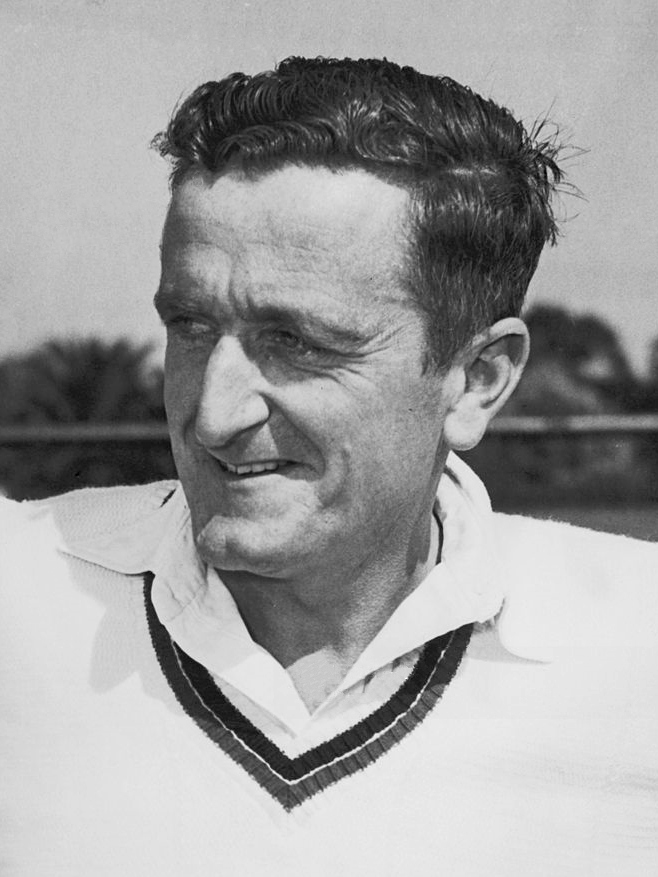

Personal information
- Full name: John Brian Iverson
- Born: 27 July 1915; St Kilda, Melbourne, Victoria, Australia
- Died: 23 October 1973 (aged 58); Brighton, Victoria, Australia
- Batting: Right-handed
- Bowling: Legbreak googly

International information
- National side: Australia
- Test debut (cap 185): 1 December 1950 v England
- Last Test: 23 February 1951 v England

Career statistics
| Competition | Tests | First-class |
|---|---|---|
| Matches | 5 | 34 |
| Runs scored | 3 | 277 |
| Batting average | 0.75 | 14.57 |
| 100s/50s | 0/0 | 0/0 |
| Top score | 1* | 31* |
| Balls bowled | 1,108 | 8,878 |
| Wickets | 21 | 157 |
| Bowling average | 15.23 | 19.22 |
| 5 wickets in innings | 1 | 9 |
| 10 wickets in match | 0 | 1 |
| Best bowling | 6/27 | 7/77 |
| Catches/stumpings | 2/– | 13/– |
- Source: CricInfo, 12 December 2018

John Brian Iverson (27 July 1915 – 23 October 1973) was an Australian cricketer who played in five Test matches from 1950 to 1951. He was known for his unique "bent finger" grip, with which he briefly perplexed batsmen across Australia as well as the touring English cricket team. His five Tests were all against England, in the 1950–51 series, but was forced to retire to look after his ailing father's business; he "could have the world's best batsmen at his mercy, if he could spare the time".

== Early years and Army service ==
John Brian Iverson was born on 27 July 1915, in St Kilda, Melbourne, and was a fast bowler at Geelong College where he was educated. His school career was notable for his dismissal of Lindsay Hassett with an inswinger in an inter-house match within his school, later to become his captain in both the Victorian and Australian teams. Iverson was to take no part in cricket for twelve years after graduation, and did not play first class cricket for another 15 years. Starting in 1933, Iverson became a jackaroo in the Mallee and later rose to become an assistant manager on a property of Essington Lewis at Tallarook.

In 1939, he enlisted in the Australian Defence Force after the outbreak of the Second World War, and served in the anti-aircraft regiments of the Ninth Division in the Middle East, before being deployed to what is now Papua New Guinea. There, Sergeant Iverson developed an unorthodox method of spinning the ball, which he gripped between his thumb and middle finger. This enabled him to bowl a wide variety of deliveries, including off breaks, leg breaks and googlies, without any change of action. At this stage he was only playing socially in spontaneous recreation with other army colleagues.

== Early career ==
Upon returning to Australia after the war, Iverson only played golf and tennis for recreation, until he had a chance encounter with blind cricketers near the Melbourne Cricket Ground which motivated him to join the suburban Brighton Cricket Club at a time when he had no cricketing equipment. He rose rapidly, from the third XI at Brighton in late 1946, to the Melbourne Cricket Club in 1948 and the Victorian team a year later.

== Test career ==
He first attracted attention in first class cricket in 1949–50 when he took 46 wickets for Victoria at an average of 16.12. In the following autumn he toured New Zealand under Bill Brown, and took, in all matches, 75 wickets at a cost of seven runs each, and in the next Australian season, aged 35, was selected for the Test team against the England cricket team captained by F. R. Brown. His unique action perplexed the visiting batsmen to such an extent that in the Test series he obtained 21 wickets for 15.73 runs apiece. Iverson made his debut in the first Test at Brisbane, where he did not bowl in the first innings before taking 4/43 in the second. He took match figures of 6/73 in his second Test at the Melbourne Cricket Ground before his most notable performance of 6/27 in the second innings of the Third Test at the Sydney Cricket Ground as Australia completed an innings victory. During the Fourth Test at Adelaide he suffered an ankle injury when he trod on the ball. This impaired his ability, as he only took 3/68 and 2/84 in the final two Tests of his career. He played in only one game in each of the next two seasons and then gave up cricket altogether after batsmen analysed and mastered his tricks.

With the bat, he scored three runs from seven innings, finishing his Test career with a batting average of 0.75.

== Playing style ==
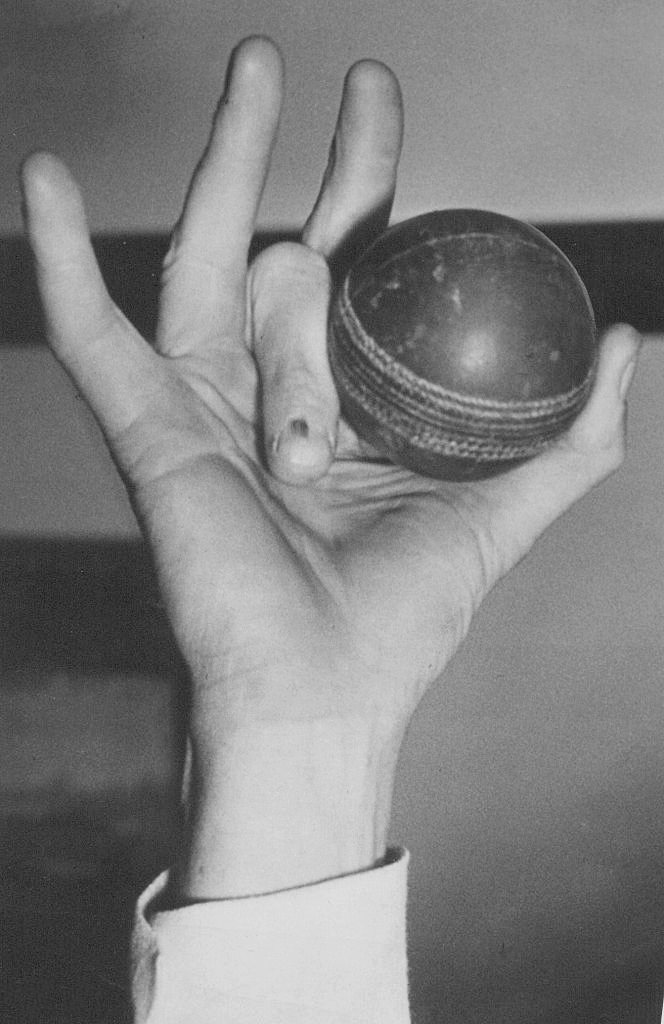
Iverson's unique bowling grip

Nicknamed "Big Jake" and "Wrong-Grip Jake", Iverson's unique style caused Australian captain Lindsay Hassett, a fellow Victorian, to hide his action during training sessions for the national team. Hassett prohibited Iverson from bowling to New South Wales batsmen to prevent them from analysing his bowling action, making him more effective in Sheffield Shield matches for Victoria against New South Wales. This led to conflict with New South Wales batsmen. When Iverson was put on to bowl during the Tests, Hassett would remove Keith Miller, a Victorian-turned-New South Welshman, from his position at first slip and move him to mid on, so that he was standing behind Iverson and could not understand how Iverson's bowling action worked.

He explained his action thus:

I woke up to the fact that whichever direction I had my thumb pointing so would the ball break... If my thumb was pointed to the left or offside as I let the ball go, the result would be legbreak. If it pointed to the right or legside the result would be a wrong'un. If it pointed directly at the batsmen, it would be a topspinner.

His style was praised by one of his contemporaries, fellow Australian leg spinner Richie Benaud and national captain, who stated in reference to Iverson's innovation that changed thinking about spin bowling:

There have been plenty of spin bowlers around for more than a hundred years but the four, for me, who have broken the mould and made batsmen think seriously about what was coming down the pitch at them, have been Bernard Bosanquet, Jack Iverson, John Gleeson and Shane Warne.

— Richie Benaud

== After cricket ==
Completed Test career bowling averages (Note: Qualification: 10 wickets, career completed.)
| Bowler | Average |
|---|---|
| Charles Marriott (ENG) | 8.72 |
| Frederick Martin (ENG) | 10.07 |
| George Lohmann (ENG) | 10.75 |
| Laurie Nash (AUS) | 12.60 |
| John Ferris (AUS/ENG) | 12.70 |
| Tom Horan (AUS) | 13.00 |
| Harry Dean (ENG) | 13.90 |
| Albert Trott (AUS/ENG) | 15.00 |
| Mike Procter (SA) | 15.02 |
| Jack Iverson (AUS) | 15.23 |
| Tom Kendall (AUS) | 15.35 |
| Alec Hurwood (AUS) | 15.45 |
| Billy Barnes (ENG) | 15.54 |
| John Trim (WI) | 16.16 |
| Billy Bates (ENG) | 16.42 |

Family commitments and his job managing a real estate agency resulted in him disappearing from the first class cricket scene in 1951. However, he accepted an invitation to tour India with the 1953–54 Commonwealth team, playing in three of the unofficial "Tests". He later became a commentator for ABC radio.

In his early 50s Iverson developed atherosclerosis of the brain, which caused him to suffer from recurrent depression. He committed suicide with a gunshot wound to the chest aged 58. He died in Brighton, Victoria.
