= The Risk, New South Wales =

Small rural locality in Australia

The Risk New South Wales
- Coordinates: 28°29′11.2″S 152°55′48.7″E
- Population: 64 (2016 census)
- Postcode(s): 2474
- Time zone: AEST (UTC+10)
  - Summer (DST): AEDT (UTC+11)
- Location: 20 km (12 mi) NW of Kyogle; 49 km (30 mi) SW of Murwillumbah; 620 km (385 mi) NE of Sydney
- LGA(s): Kyogle
- Region: Northern Rivers
- State electorate(s): Lismore
- Federal division(s): Page

The Risk is a small rural locality approximately 20 kilometres (12 mi) north-west of Kyogle in the local government area of Kyogle Council, part of the Northern Rivers region of New South Wales, Australia.

At the 2016 census, the town recorded a population of 64, with a median age of 39.

The Risk Public School, a small primary school with approximately 30 pupils, is located within the area.
