= Stan Munro =

Drag performer and comedian

- Born: 1941 (age 84–85)
- Occupations: Female impersonator; drag performer; comedian; author
- Known for: Original cast member of Les Girls
- Notable work: Stan Munro: Secrets of a Showbiz Dame (autobiography)
- Awards: ACON Honour Award (Arts & Entertainment, 2024)

Stan Munro is a female impersonator, drag performer and comedian born 1941 in Wales. He has been performing since he was 13 years old touring with The Francis Langford Boys Choir.

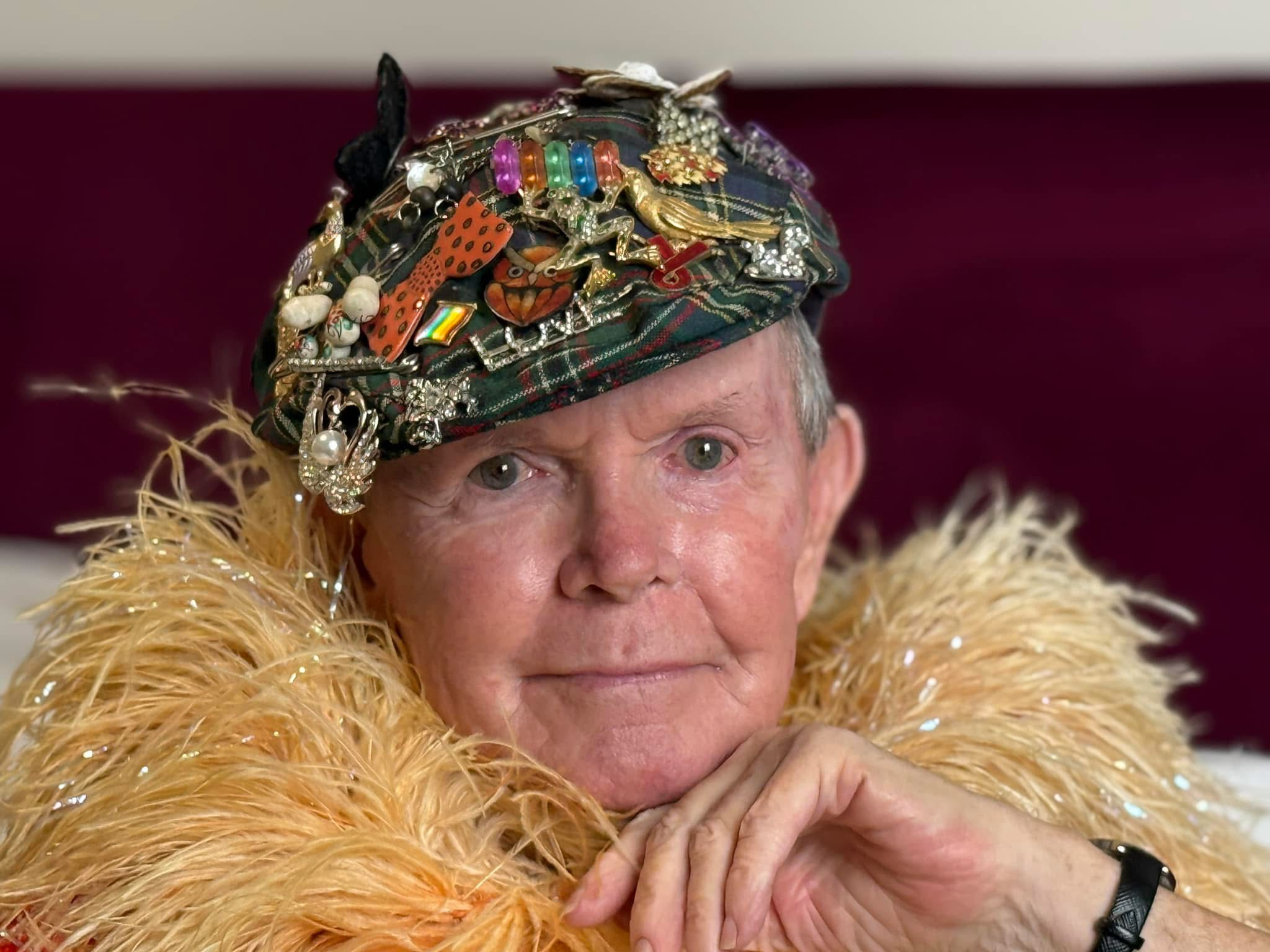
Stan Munro in February 2025

In 1963, Munro joined the long-running internationally renowned cabaret show Les Girls in Kings Cross, Sydney as one of the original cast members alongside Carlotta. While performing with Les Girls, Munro spoke Polari, popularising it with the other performers.

In 1970 when Les Girls arrived in Melbourne, Munro led the troupe and was the compère, performing for seven years. He was the first female impersonator to perform at Pentridge Prison.

Outside Australia Munro has performed across Asia, Europe and the United Kingdom

In 1973 Munro appeared on the Graham Kennedy Show interviewed by Bert Newton following a performance by the Les Girls cast. He has also starred in the 1970 Jeff Bridges film Yin and Yang of Mr Go, and Alvin Purple where he was one of the first female impersonators to be featured in an Australian film.

In 2021 Munro was featured on the ABC TV (Australian TV channel) program Backroads. In 2023, he appeared on ABC television's Queerstralia as part of the 45th anniversary commemorations of the first Sydney Gay and Lesbian Mardi Gras. In 2025, Munro was a member of the panel on SBS (Australian TV channel) program Tell Me What You Really Think.

Between 2022 and 2024 Munro performed his autobiographical show ‘Vintage Drag in Mint Condition’ with interviewer, author and academic Kevin Markwell in venues across New South Wales, Victoria and the Northern Territory.

During 2024 Munro was awarded an AIDS Council of NSW (ACON) Honour Award as the joint winner in the Arts & Entertainment category.

in 2026 Munro released his autobiography ‘Stan Munro: Secrets of a Showbiz Dame’ which he wrote with author and journalist William Brougham. It was launched in the town of Kyogle in the Northern Rivers region of New South Wales where Stan lives.
