= Jacqueline Lawrence (canoeist) =

Australian canoeist (born 1982)

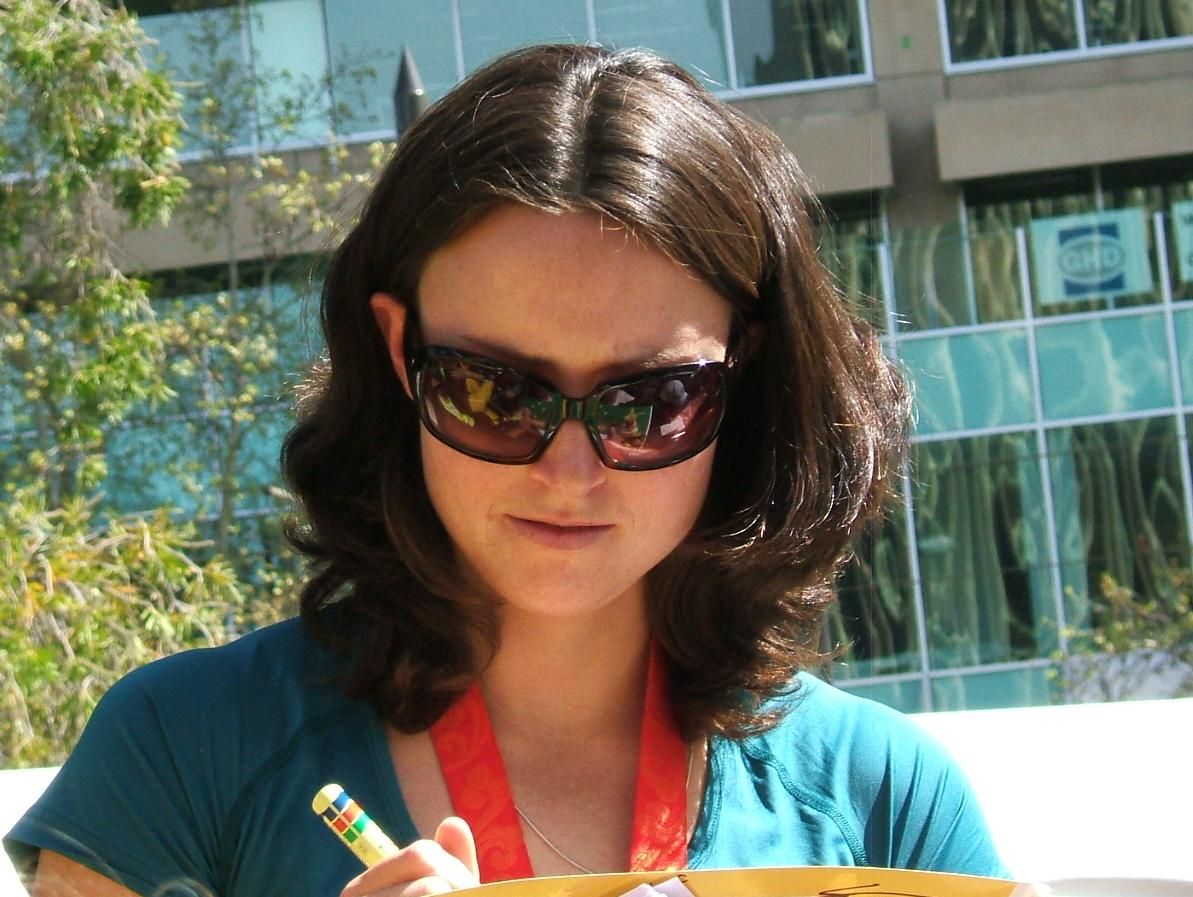
- Lawrence in 2008

Personal information
- Born: 25 April 1982 (age 44) Cooma, New South Wales, Australia
Medal record
Women's canoe slalom
Representing Australia
Olympic Games
Silver medal – second place	2008 Beijing	K1

Jacqueline "Jacqui" Lawrence (born 25 April 1982 in Cooma, New South Wales) is an Australian slalom canoeist and Olympic silver medallist, from Old Bonalbo, New South Wales. She competed at the international level from 2000 to 2008.

At the 2008 Summer Olympics, she won silver in the K1 event at the Shunyi Olympic Rowing-Canoeing Park.

Her younger sisters Katrina and Rosalyn are also slalom canoeists and in the Olympic trials, Jacqui had to defeat Kate for a place on the Australian team.

Jacqui went to the University of New England in Armidale and was part of Drummond and Smith College.

== World Cup individual podiums ==
Season	Date	Venue	Position	Event
2005	30 Jan 2005	Mangahao	2nd	K1^{1}
2006	26 Feb 2006	Mangahao	2nd	K1^{2}

^{1} Continental Cup Oceania counting for World Cup points
^{2} Oceania Championship counting for World Cup points
