= Yabbra National Park =

National park in Australia

- IUCN category II (national park)
- Location within New South Wales
- Location: New South Wales
- Coordinates: 29°56′39″S 152°30′39″E
- Area: 88.9 km^{2} (34.3 sq mi)
- Established: 1999
- Governing body: NSW National Parks & Wildlife Service
- Website: Official website

Yabbra is a national park in New South Wales, Australia, 598 km north of Sydney.

The average elevation of the terrain is 387 metres.

== See also ==
- Protected areas of New South Wales
