= Woodenbong =

- Town
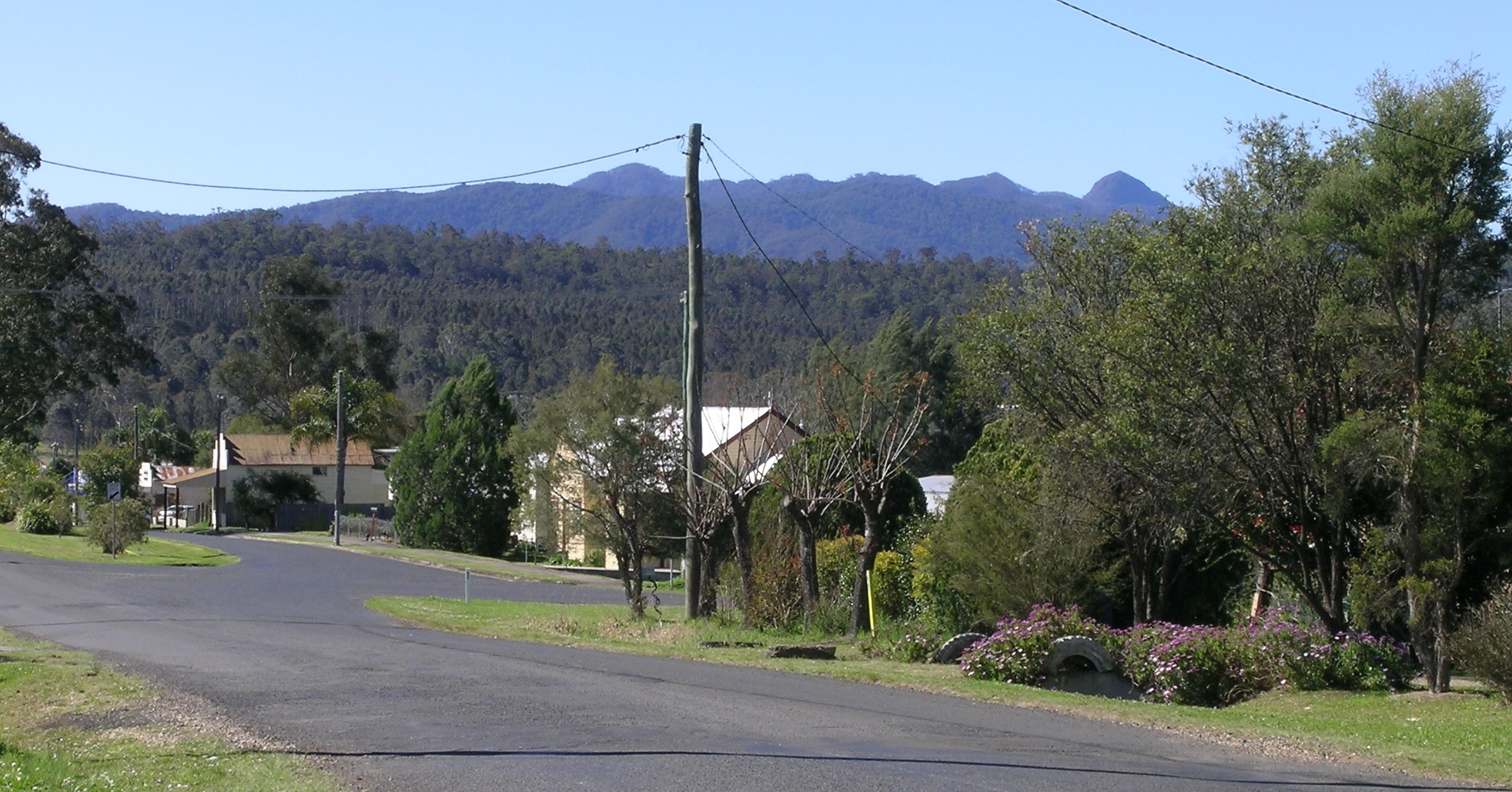
- Woodenbong

- Coordinates: 28°23′0″S 152°36′0″E
- Country: Australia
- State: New South Wales
- LGA: Kyogle Council
- Location: 798 km (496 mi) N of Sydney; 145 km (90 mi) SW of Brisbane; 89 km (55 mi) E of Warwick (Qld); 90 km (56 mi) NW of Casino; 60 km (37 mi) NW of Kyogle

Government
  - State electorate: Lismore
  - Federal divisions: New England; Page
- Elevation: 402 m (1,319 ft)

Population
  - Total: 390 (2021 census)
- Postcode: 2476

Woodenbong is a rural village in the Kyogle Shire of northern New South Wales. It is situated 10 kilometres (6.2 mi) south of the Queensland border and 5 kilometres (3.1 mi) south of the junction of the Summerland Way and the Mount Lindesay Road, which leads to Legume and eventually Tenterfield. At the 2021 census Woodenbong had a population of 390.

It is 798 kilometres (496 mi) north-east of Sydney, 148 kilometres (92 mi) from Brisbane and 60 kilometres (37 mi) north-west of Kyogle.

== Education ==
Woodenbong is home to Woodenbong Central School, a Kindergarten – Year 12 central school, that serves as the common education centre for Woodenbong, as well as surrounding towns, Urbenville and Muli Muli. Woodenbong Central School has played host on numerous occasions to sporting events held between other rural New South Wales towns.

== Origin of place name ==
The name is derived from a Githabul word meaning wood ducks on a lagoon. The Githabal (also known as Gidabal, Kitabal) language region includes the landscape within the local government boundaries in Queensland of the Southern Downs Regional Council, particularly Warwick, Killarney, and Woodenbong extending into New South Wales.

== Agriculture ==
Dairy farming and cattle grazing are the two main industries.

== National Parks ==
A number of National Parks are close to Woodenbong, some of which are declared World Heritage areas.

- Border Ranges National Park
- Koreelah National Park
- Toonumbar National Park
- Mount Warning National Park
- Lamington National Park
- Mount Barney National Park
- Springbrook National Park
