= Urbenville, New South Wales =

Urbenville
- Town
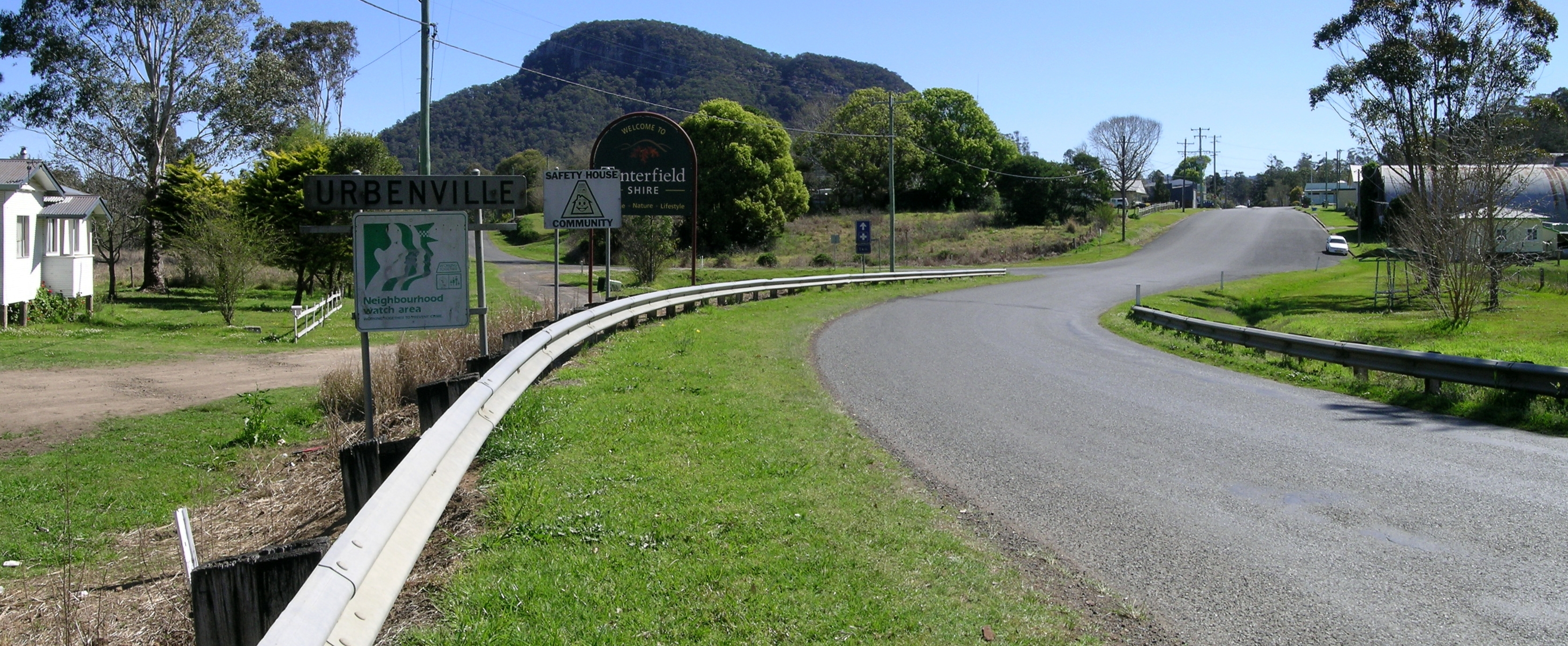
- Urbenville with Crown Mountain in the background.

- Coordinates: 28°28′0″S 152°32′0″E
- Country: Australia
- State: New South Wales
- LGAs: Tenterfield Shire; Kyogle Concil
- Location: 822 km (511 mi) N of Sydney; 150 km (93 mi) SW of Brisbane; 86 km (53 mi) SW of Beaudesert (Qld); 73 km (45 mi) WNW of Kyogle; 13 km (8.1 mi) SW of Woodenbong

Government
  - State electorate: Lismore
  - Federal division: New England
- Elevation: 370 m (1,210 ft)

Population
  - Total: 446 (2011 census)
- Postcode: 2475
- Mean max temp: 23.6 °C (74.5 °F)
- Mean min temp: 10.2 °C (50.4 °F)
- Annual rainfall: 1,028.5 mm (40.49 in)

Urbenville is a rural village in northern New South Wales, Australia. The village is located in the Tenterfield Shire local government area, 822 kilometres (511 mi) north of the state capital, Sydney, and 150 kilometres (93 mi) south west of Brisbane. At the 2006 census, Urbenville had a population of 245 and at the 2011 census, Urbenville had a population of 446.

Urbenville has a new hospital which services the region along with an aged care nursing home.

The bank in the small town is heritage listed. Land surrounding the area is being planted with trees to be cut down for furniture. The town was established around 1860 when there was a gold rush nearby. Urbenville Post Office opened on 1 April, 1910.

Forestry, corn and soya crops and cattle raising are the main industries in the area. Four-wheel drive and both on & off-road motorcycle enthusiasts are users of the many nearby state forests and national parks.

== Media ==
Urbenville is served by the Border Districts Community Radio Station 89.7 Ten FM which is transmitted from a 4 kW transmitter located on Mount Mackenzie, Tenterfield.
