= Tooloom National Park =

National park in Australia

- IUCN category II (national park)
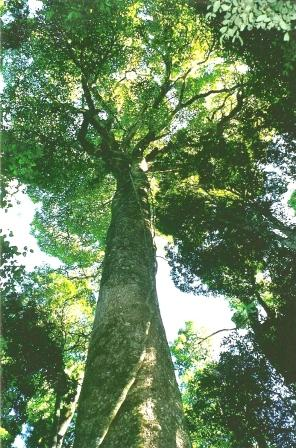
- Giant white beech at Tooloom Scrub

- Location within New South Wales
- Location: New South Wales
- Nearest city: Urbenville
- Coordinates: 28°26′47″S 152°27′13″E
- Area: 43.80 km^{2} (16.91 sq mi)
- Established: 22 December 1995
- Governing body: NSW National Parks & Wildlife Service
- Website: Official website

The Tooloom National Park is a protected national park located in the Northern Rivers region of New South Wales, Australia. The 4,380-hectare (10,800-acre) part is situated approximately 616 kilometres (383 mi) north of Sydney and 20 kilometres (12 mi) from the border town of Urbenville.

The park is part of the Focal Peak Group World Heritage Site Gondwana Rainforests of Australia inscribed in 1986 and added to the Australian National Heritage List in 2007.

The name Tooloom is derived from Bundjalung word Duluhm meaning headlice, referring to the Tooloom Falls.

The average summer temperature in the park ranges from 16 °C and 28 °C, and the winter temperature ranges from 3.5 °C and 18 °C.

== Fauna ==
The endangered species of long-nosed potoroo lives in the park, and there are also ten species of wallabies and kangaroos.

== Gallery ==
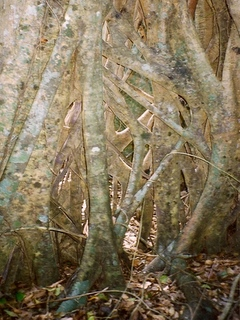
Hollow base of a strangler fig, Tooloom Scrub

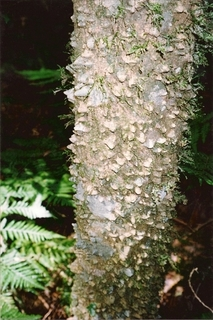
Thorny yellowwood at Tooloom Scrub

== See also ==
- Protected areas of New South Wales
