= Kyogle Council =

- Local government area
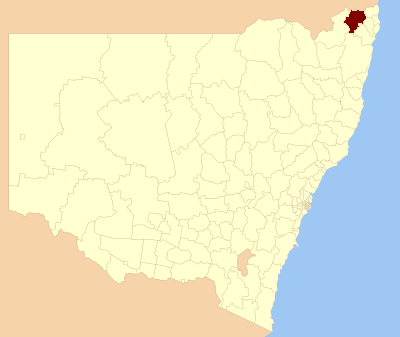
- Location in New South Wales

- Interactive map of Kyogle Council
- Country: Australia
- State: New South Wales
- Region: Northern Rivers
- Council seat: Kyogle

Government
  - Mayor: Danielle Mulholland, (Independent)
  - State electorate: Lismore
  - Federal division: Page

Area
  - Total: 3,589 km^{2} (1,386 sq mi)

Population
  - Totals: 8,940 (2016 census); 8,870 (2018 est.)
  - Density: 2.4909/km^{2} (6.452/sq mi)
- Website: Kyogle Council
LGAs around Kyogle Council
Scenic Rim (Qld)	Scenic Rim (Qld)	Tweed Shire
Tenterfield	Kyogle Council	Lismore
Tenterfield	Clarence Valley	Richmond Valley

Kyogle Council is a local government area in the Northern Rivers region of New South Wales, Australia.

The council services an area of 3,589 square kilometres (1,386 sq mi) and is located adjacent to the Summerland Way and the North Coast railway line, within two hours drive from Brisbane and one hour from the Queensland Gold Coast and the NSW coastal communities of Byron Bay, Ballina and Tweed Heads. Kyogle Council comprises a large and diverse region with natural attributes, including the Border Ranges National Park and other world heritage listed areas, and cultural features.

The mayor of Kyogle Council is Danielle Mulholland.

In 2015, Kyogle Council was deemed 'not fit for future' by the New South Wales government's Independent Pricing and Regulatory Tribunal and was urged to merge with a nearby council, although the NSW government backflipped later in 2015 and allowed the council to continue in its current form.

== Towns and localities ==
- Afterlee
- Babyl Creek
- Barkers Vale
- Bean Creek
- Bentley
- Bingeebeebra Creek
- Bonalbo
- Boomi Creek
- Boorabee Park
- Bottle Creek
- Brumby Plains
- Capeen Creek
- Cawongla
- Cedar Point
- Collins Creek
- Cougal
- Culmaran Creek
- Dairy Flat
- Deep Creek (Kyogle)
- Dobies Bight
- Doubtful Creek
- Duck Creek
- Dyraaba
- Eden Creek
- Edenville
- Ettrick
- Fawcetts Plain
- Findon Creek
- Geneva
- Ghinni Ghi
- Gorge Creek
- Gradys Creek
- Green Pigeon
- Grevillia
- Haystack
- Homeleigh
- Horse Station Creek
- Horseshoe Creek
- Iron Pot Creek
- Jacksons Flat
- Joes Box
- Kilgra
- Kyogle
- Larnook
- Lillian Rock
- Lindesay Creek
- Little Back Creek
- Loadstone
- Lower Bottle Creek
- Lower Duck Creek
- Lower Dyraaba
- Lower Peacock
- Lynchs Creek
- Mallanganee
- Mummulgum
- New Park
- Old Bonalbo
- Old Grevillia
- Paddys Flat
- Pagans Flat
- Peacock Creek
- Piora
- Roseberry Creek
- Rukenvale
- Sandilands
- Sawpit Creek
- Sextonville
- Sherwood
- Simpkins Creek
- Smiths Creek
- Tabulam
- Terrace Creek
- The Glen
- The Risk
- Theresa Creek
- Tooloom
- Toonumbar
- Tunglebung
- Unumgar
- Upper Duck Creek
- Upper Eden Creek
- Upper Horseshoe Creek
- Urbenville
- Wadeville
- Warrazambil Creek
- West Wiangaree
- Wiangaree
- Woodenbong
- Woolners Arm
- Wyneden
- Yabbra

== Heritage listings ==
The Kyogle Council has a number of heritage-listed sites, including:

- High Conservation Value Old Growth forest
- Cougal, 871.00 km Border Loop, North Coast railway: Cougal Spiral

== Election results ==
=== 2024 ===
2024 New South Wales local elections: Kyogle
Party	Votes	%	Swing	Seats	Change
Independents					
Independent Labor					
Formal votes					
Informal votes					
Total					
Registered voters / turnout					

=== 2021 ===
2021 New South Wales local elections: Kyogle
Party	Votes	%	Swing	Seats	Change
Independent	3,419	100.0	+0.0	9	Steady
Formal votes	3,419	95.2			
Informal votes	172	4.8			
Total	3,591	100.0			
Registered voters / turnout	6,688	53.7			

== Demographics ==
At the 2011 census, there were 9,228 people in the Kyogle local government area, of these 50.3 per cent were male and 49.7 per cent were female. Aboriginal and Torres Strait Islander people made up 5.3 per cent of the population, which was significantly higher than the national and state averages of 2.5 per cent. The median age of people in the Kyogle Council area was 45 years, which was significantly higher than the national median of 37 years. Children aged 0–14 years made up 19.1 per cent of the population and people aged 65 years and over made up 17.3 per cent of the population. Of people in the area aged 15 years and over, 46.6 per cent were married and 15.1 per cent were either divorced or separated.

Population growth in the Kyogle Council area between the 2001 census and the 2006 census was 1.06 per cent; and in the subsequent five years to the 2011 census, the population declined 0.3 per cent. When compared with total population growth of Australia for the same periods, being 5.78 per cent and 8.32 per cent respectively, population growth in the Kyogle local government area was significantly lower than the national average. The median weekly income for residents within the Kyogle Council area was significantly lower than the national average.

At the 2011 census, the proportion of residents in the Kyogle local government area who stated their ancestry as Australian or Anglo-Saxon exceeded 85 per cent of all residents (national average was 65.2 per cent). In excess of 23 per cent of all residents in the Kyogle Council at the 2011 census nominated no religious affiliation, compared to the national average of 22.3 per cent. Meanwhile, affiliation with Christianity was 55 per cent, which was slightly higher than the national average of 50.2 per cent. As at the census date, compared to the national average, households in the Kyogle local government area had a significantly lower than average proportion (3.5 per cent) where two or more languages are spoken (national average was 20.4 per cent); and a significantly higher proportion (92.9 per cent) where English only was spoken at home (national average was 76.8 per cent).

Selected historical census data for the Kyogle Council local government area
Census year		2001	2006	2011
Population	Estimated residents on Census night	9,159	9,256	9,228
Population	LGA rank in terms of size within New South Wales			92
Population	% of New South Wales population			0.13%
Population	% of Australian population	0.05%	0.05%	▼0.04%
Cultural and language diversity				
Ancestry, top responses	Australian			32.3%
Ancestry, top responses	English			31.6%
Ancestry, top responses	Irish			10.2%
Ancestry, top responses	Scottish			7.7%
Ancestry, top responses	German			3.4%
Language, top responses (other than English)	German	0.6%	0.6%	▼0.5%
Language, top responses (other than English)	Italian	0.2%	▲0.3%	▼0.2%
Language, top responses (other than English)	Swedish	n/c	▲0.1%	▲0.2%
Language, top responses (other than English)	French	0.1%	0.1%	▲0.2%
Language, top responses (other than English)	Telugu	n/c	n/c	▲0.1%
Religious affiliation				
Religious affiliation, top responses	No Religion	15.1%	▲18.4%	▲23.4%
Religious affiliation, top responses	Anglican	23.9%	▼23.4%	▼21.4%
Religious affiliation, top responses	Catholic	21.0%	▼20.7%	▼19.6%
Religious affiliation, top responses	Uniting Church	11.0%	▼9.3%	▼8.0%
Religious affiliation, top responses	Presbyterian and Reformed	7.0%	▼6.1%	▼6.0%
Median weekly incomes				
Personal income	Median weekly personal income		A$305	A$376
Personal income	% of Australian median income		65.5%	▼65.2%
Family income	Median weekly family income		A$705	A$883
Family income	% of Australian median income		60.2%	▼59.66%
Household income	Median weekly household income		A$599	A$714
Household income	% of Australian median income		58.3%	▼57.9%
