= Toonumbar National Park =

National park in New South Wales, Australia

- IUCN category II (national park)
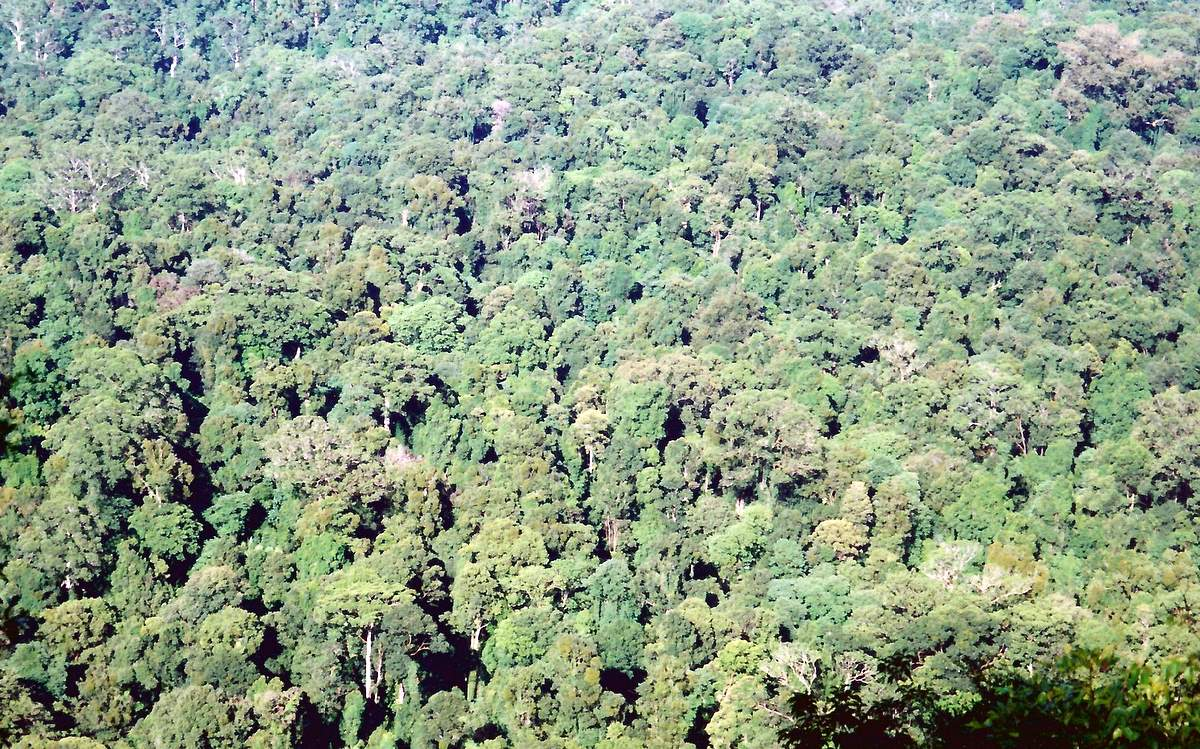
- Tall sub tropical rainforest at Toonumbar National Park

- Location within New South Wales
- Location: New South Wales
- Nearest city: Woodenbong
- Coordinates: 28°29′16″S 152°43′33″E
- Area: 149.1 km^{2} (57.6 sq mi)
- Established: 22 December 1995
- Governing body: NSW National Parks & Wildlife Service
- Website: Official website

The Toonumbar National Park is a protected national park located in the Northern Rivers region of New South Wales, Australia. The 14,910-hectare (36,800-acre) park is situated approximately 620 kilometres (390 mi) north of Sydney, near the town of Woodenbong.

The park is part of the Focal Peak Group World Heritage Site Gondwana Rainforests of Australia inscribed in 1986 and added to the Australian National Heritage List in 2007.

== Description ==
The park features subtropical rainforests protecting threatened plants and animals, such as the sooty owl, red-legged pademelon and yellow-bellied glider. The rainforests on Dome Mountain and the Murray Scrub are part of the World Heritage listed Gondwana Rainforests of Australia. The rugged landscape of Mount Lindesay, Dome Mountain and Edinburgh Castle have provided the inspiration for many local Aboriginal legends.

The Murray Scrub and the Dome Mountain Forest contain significant areas of subtropical and temperate rainforest and are listed as part of the World Heritage Gondwana Rainforests of Australia. There are also drier and cooler places in the park and this has resulted in incredible diversity of flora, from eucalypt woodlands and tall gum forests, to forests of bangalow palms.

Animals in the park include marbled frogmouth, koala, Albert lyrebird and rainforest reptiles and frogs. The rainforest area is an important refuge for a number of fruit-eating pigeons and insectivorous bats. Pademelons also live there.

Focal Peak Volcano situated in Mt Barney National Park was active 23 million years ago and was responsible for the eroded volcanic remains of Mount Lindesay, Dome Mountain and Edinburgh Castle that dominate the landscape today. The high rainfall combined with fertile soil have created lush rainforests.

On average, the park receives 1,035.8 millimetres (40.78 in) of rain each year. Its highest recorded rainfall was 449.4 millimetres (17.69 in) in one day.

== Native title claim ==
Toonumbar National Park was part of the successful Githabul Nation native title claim. The Native title claimant Trevor Close an Aboriginal lawyer fought the NSW Government fifteen years probono to win the historic Native Title claim in memory of his grandfather Rory Close and his children Nea Close, Marnie Close Sera Close, Issiah Close and Tomika Close, Yartha Close and Kory Close. Trevor Close Githabul Tribal name is Mudargun which means lawman.

Inside Toonumbar National Park there are a number of jurabihls (increase sites) which were recorded with the assistance of the late Auntie Millie Boyd in 1974 by Howard Creamer. These types of sites (involving a complex set of religious and ritualistic beliefs) are of National significance due to their rarity in Australia and the rest of the world. Dome Mountain is the Githabul sacred site for the rain ceremony. Edinburgh Castle is the Goanna site and owned by the Clara Williams descendants who reside at the Aboriginal Reservation Muli Muli, which is 10 km (6 mi) west of the town of Woodenbong.

== Gallery ==
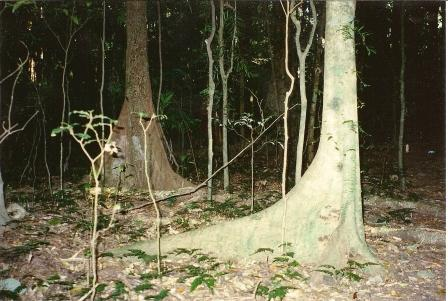
Black & white booyong - Argyrodendron actinophyllum and Argyrodendron trifoliolatum - Toonumbar National Park

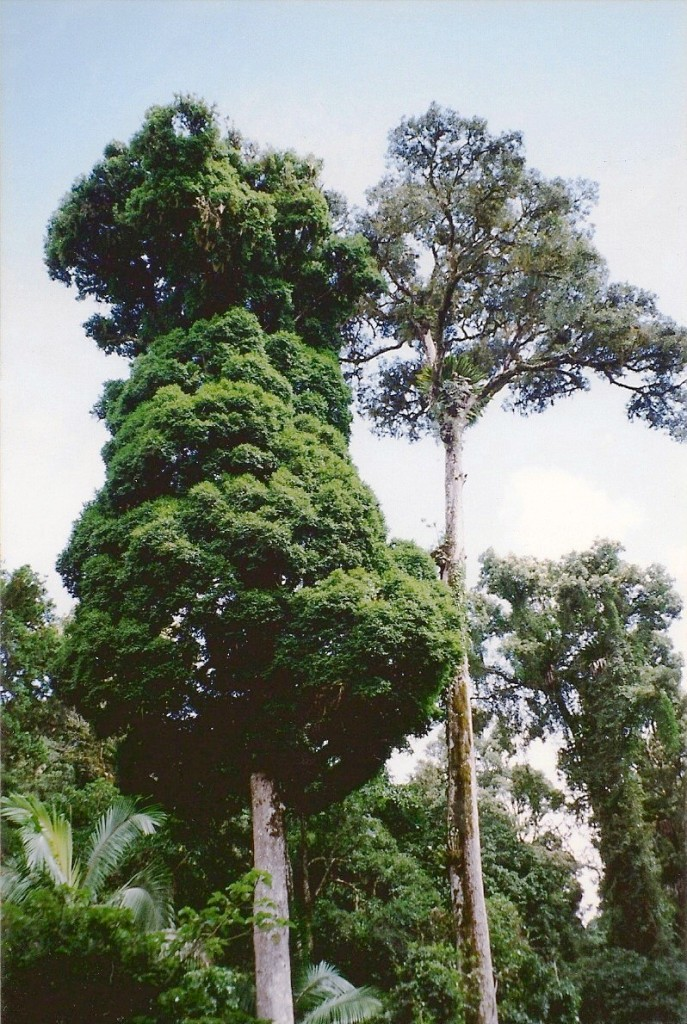
Syzygium francisii (left) and Argyrodendron trifoliolatum (right), 40 metres tall - Toonumbar National Park

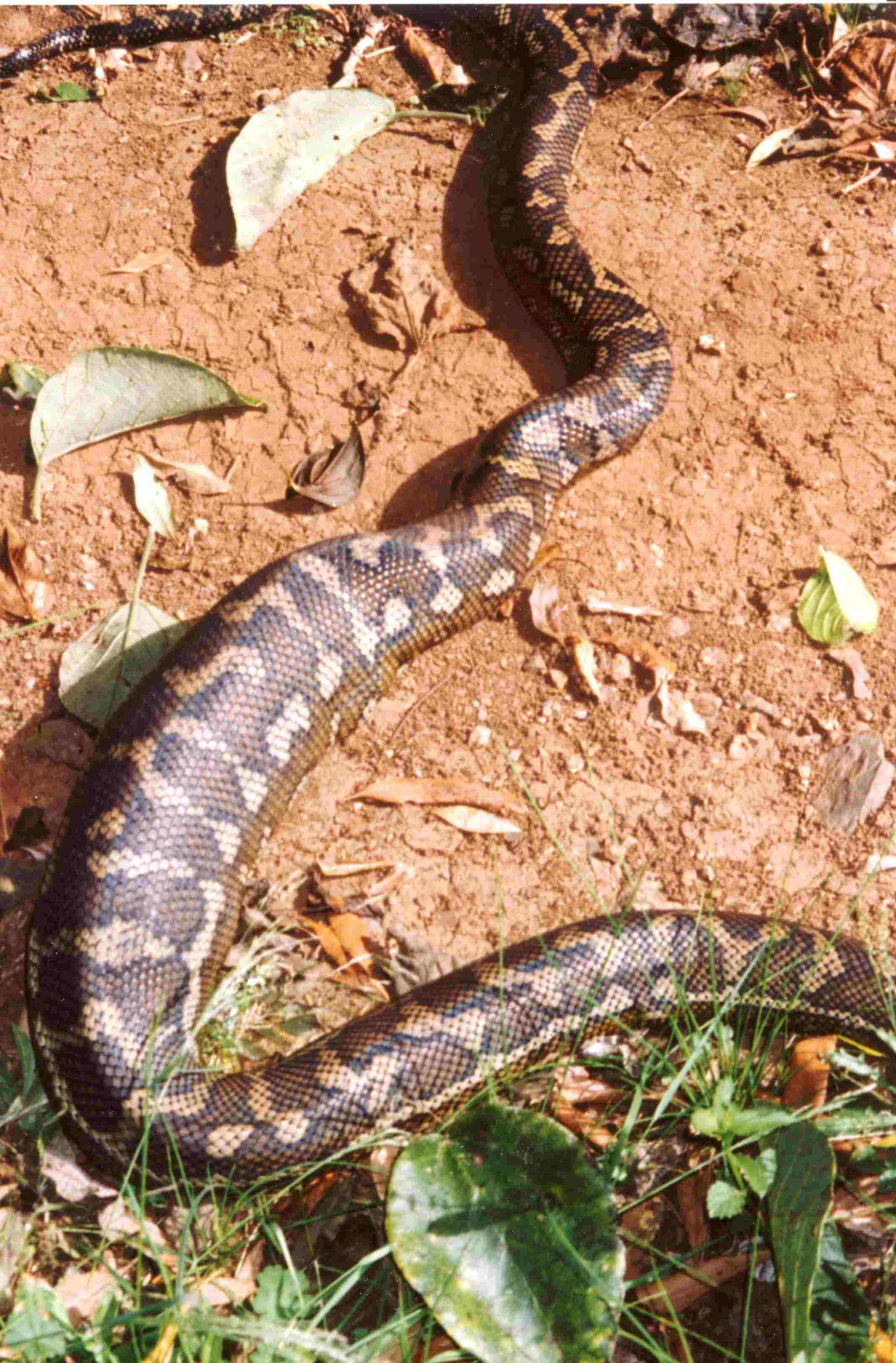
Carpet python (Morelia spilota mcdowelli) digesting a meal at Toonumbar National Park

== See also ==
- Protected areas of New South Wales
