= Western Bundjalung people =

The Western Bundjalung or Bundjalung people are an aggregation of tribes of Australian Aboriginal people who inhabit north-east NSW along the Clarence River, now within the Clarence Valley, Glen Innes Severn Shire, Kyogle, Richmond Valley, and Tenterfield Shire Council areas.

== Country ==
Descendants of the Western Bundjalung claim a land extending over 5,000 square kilometres (1,900 mi^{2}) extending from the Hogarth Range westwards as far as Bald Rock National Park and taking in the Clarence River at Moleville, north of Grafton, to Carpet Snake Creek, north of Tabulam.

== Language ==
The Western Bundjalung a range of dialects, known as the Middle Clarence dialects, belonging to the Bandjalangic languages. It comprised several dialects:

- Waalulbal
- Baryulgil/Wirribi versions of Wehlubal
- Casino, a Galibal dialect.

== History of contact ==
Squatters began taking up tracts of West Bundjalung land in the 1840s. The first grant of land was made to one, Stapleton, in 1840. One of the colonials, a Scottish squatter Peter Cunningham Pagan from Dumfries, who had come up with his companion William Evans with a large flock of sheep from the Hunter Valley, was speared on 22 April 1841. Various contemporary reports survive, but the exact sequence of events which led to a revenge massacre are not clear. Pagan had observed blacks entering and leaving his hut while he was working outside. He waited for them to move on, fetched his gun and followed them to a river nearby, suspecting them of theft. He was speared and died immediately. A posse of white vigilantes organized a night raid on the aborigines camped at Yulgilbar. In the initial 3 a.m. assault, several aborigines were shot, and a New Zealander felled many others, 'tomahawk(ing) all he could get at-young or old.' Failing to find any trace of Pagan's good, the posse moved on, and a policeman brandishing a shotgun blasted his way through another camp where, after the massacre, Pagan's hat, nothing else, was found. A native tradition of the incident was retrieved in an interview with the Western Bundjalung man Mundi, who managed to escape as a child, carrying a bullet hole in his ear for the rest of his life. According to Bundjalung oral history, at least 17 members of the tribe were cut down in these incidents.

== Native title ==
On 29 August 2017 the Federal court justice Jayne Jagot ruled in favour of the Western Bundjalung granting recognition of their claim to native title, while severely criticising the New South Wales government for its bureaucratic foot-dragging in settling a claim that had been made six years earlier, in 2011. This determination covered more than 800 areas of land and was the 10th in NSW.

== People ==
- Archie Roach (father's family)

== Sources ==
- Crowley, Terry (1978). The middle Clarence dialects of Bandjalang. Australian Institute of Aboriginal Studies.
- Elley, Samantha (19 August 2017). "Hat theft deteriorates into murder and massacre". The Northern Star.
- Knaus, Christopher (31 August 2017). "Native title claims: federal court delivers stinging criticism of NSW government". The Guardian.
- MacKenzie, Bruce; Marciniak, Catherine; Turnbull, Samantha (13 September 2017). "Western Bundjalung Native Title granted as Federal Court judge criticises process as too slow". ABC News.
- "NCD2017/002 - Western Bundjalung People". National Native Title Tribunal. 2017.
- Sharpe, Margaret C. (1985). "Bundjalung settlement and migration" (PDF). Aboriginal History. 9 (1): 101–124.
- "Tabulam". The Sydney Morning Herald. 8 February 2004.
