= Gidhabal =

Indigenous Australian tribe

The Gidhabal, also known as Kitabal and Githabul, are an Aboriginal Australian people of southern Queensland, who inhabited an area in south-east Queensland and north-east New South Wales, now within the Southern Downs, Tenterfield and Kyogle local government regions.

== Language ==
The Gidhabal people's language is called Gidhabal. It is variety of the Condamine-Upper Clarence language, a dialect cluster of the wider Bundjalungic branch of Pama–Nyungan language family, though the Githabul dislike calling their language Bundjalung as a descriptor of their speech.

== Country ==
According to Norman Tindale, the Githabul people owned over some 440,000 hectares (1,700 mi^{2}) of territory, which lay around the headwaters of the Clarence, Richmond, and Logan rivers on the Great Dividing Range. He added that it extended from Killarney to Urbenville, Woodenbong, Unumgar (Nganamgah), and Tooloom. at Rathdowney and about Spicer Gap. Tindale placed its southern reaches near the vicinity of Tabulam and Drake.

== Social organisation ==
R. H. Mathews stayed with the Githabul in 1898 and picked up the following information concerning their social divisions, which were fourfold.

Cycle	Mother	Father	Son	Daughter
Karrpiyan (Note: Updating Mathews' Karpeun.)	Barrangan	Dyerwain	Bandyoor	Bandyooran
Karrpiyan	Bandyooran	Bunda	Barrang	Barrangan
Tiyatyi (Note: Updating Mathews' Deeadyee.)	Dyerwaingan	Barrang	Bunda	Bundagan
Tiyatyi	Bundagan	Bandyoor	Dyerwain	Dyerwaingan

== Native title ==
In September 1995 Githabul legal scholar Trevor Close, on behalf of his people, lodged a native title claim for 140,600 hectares (347,000 acres) in the Kyogle, Woodenbong and Tenterfield areas in northeast New South Wales and in Queensland, south of Rathdowney. Justice Catherine Branson of the Federal Court of Australia, on 29 November 2007, made a consent determination recognising their non-exclusive native title rights and interests over 112,000 hectares (430 mi^{2}) in nine national parks and 13 state forests in northern New South Wales.

In May 2021 the Githabul peoples lodged a Native Title claim (Waringh Waringh) over much of the former Warwick Shire within the Southern Downs Regional Council area of Queensland.

== Alternative names ==
- Kidabal, Kidjabal, Kit(t)a-bool, Kittabool, Kitabool, Kitapul
- Gidabul, Gidjoobal
- Kuttibul
- Noowidal

== Notable people ==
- Frank Roberts (1945–2011), boxer, one of three first Indigenous Australians to participate in the Olympics, in the 1964 Tokyo Olympics

== Sources ==
- "AIATSIS map of Indigenous Australia". AIATSIS. 28 July 2023.
- Crowley, Terry (1978). The middle Clarence dialects of Bandjalang. Australian Institute of Aboriginal Studies. pp. 142–171. ISBN 0855750650.
- "Githabul People's native title determination North-eastern New South Wales" (PDF). National Native Title Tribunal. 29 November 2009.
- "Githabul People's native title recognised in NSW". National Native Title Tribunal. 29 November 2007.
- Mathews, R. H. (1898a). "Initiation ceremonies of some Queensland tribes". Proceedings of the American Philosophical Society. 37 (157): 54–73. JSTOR 983694.
- Mathews, R. H. (1898b). "Divisions of Queensland aborigines". Proceedings of the American Philosophical Society. 37: 327–336.
- Mathews, R. H. (1907). "Notes on the aborigines of the Northern Territory, Western Australia, and Queensland" (PDF). Queensland Geographical Journal. 22: 74–86.
- Meade, Kevin (11 September 2007). "Tribe on a high as heartland won back". The Australian.
- Mercer, Phil (2 January 2007). "Aborigines in big land claim win". BBC News.
- Sharpe, Margaret C. (1985). "Bundjalung Settlement and Migration" (PDF). Aboriginal History. 9 (1): 101–124.
- Sharpe, Margaret C. (2005). An Introduction to the Yugambeh-Bundjalung Language and its Dialects (4th ed.). Armidale: University of New England.
- Tindale, Norman Barnett (1974). "Kitabal (NSW)". Aboriginal Tribes of Australia: Their Terrain, Environmental Controls, Distribution, Limits, and Proper Names. Australian National University Press.
