= Kyogle =

Town in New South Wales, Australia

- Town
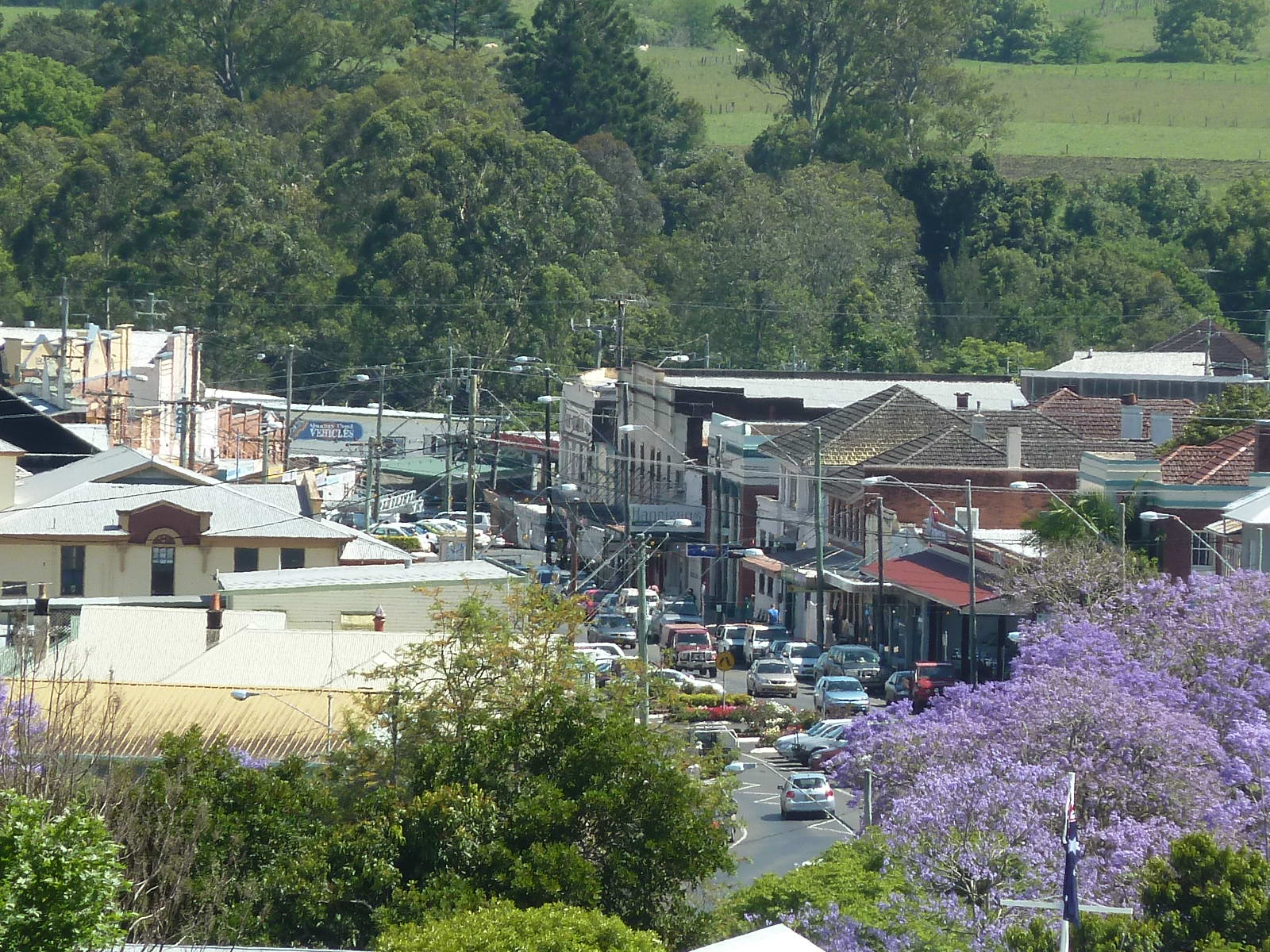
- Main street

- Coordinates: 28°37′S 153°0′E
- Country: Australia
- State: New South Wales
- Region: Northern Rivers
- LGA: Kyogle Council
- Location: 746 km (464 mi) NNE of Sydney; 163 km (101 mi) S of Brisbane; 31 km (19 mi) N of Casino; 44 km (27 mi) NW of Lismore; 131 km (81 mi) N of Grafton
- Established: 1830s

Government
  - State electorate: Lismore
  - Federal division: Page
- Elevation: 72 m (236 ft)

Population
  - Total: 2,804 (2021 census)
- Postcode: 2474

Historical population
Year	Pop.	±%
1921		—
1933		—
1947		—
1954	2,929	—
1961	2,985	+1.9%
1966	2,846	−4.7%
1971	2,966	+4.2%
1976	2,959	−0.2%
1981	3,070	+3.8%
1986	2,983	−2.8%
1991	2,912	−2.4%
1996	2,866	−1.6%
2001	2,729	−4.8%
2006	2,731	+0.1%
2011	2,739	+0.3%
2016	2,751	+0.4%
2021	2,804	+1.9%
Source: Australian Bureau of Statistics data.

Kyogle (/kaɪoʊɡəl/) is a town in the Northern Rivers region of northern New South Wales, Australia. It falls within the local government area of Kyogle Council. At the 2021 census, Kyogle had a population of 2,804. Kyogle is known as a "gateway" to many national parks including Border Ranges National Park and Toonumbar National Park.

== History ==
It was founded in the 1830s as a lumber camp, and is located 758 kilometres (471 mi) north of Sydney, 32 kilometres (20 mi) north of Casino on the Summerland Way close to the Queensland border. It also lies on the banks of the Richmond River. It is the seat of its own shire.

The origin of the name of Kyogle is contested with two main theories as to its origin. The primary theory is that the name is adapted from the Bundjalung word gayugul meaning ‘native companion/brolga' and that this reflects the prevalence of them in the area. The second theory is that the name is derived from the Bundjalung word kaiou-gal which has two alternative definitions proposed; one is the ‘place of the bush turkey' and the other is 'turkey's egg'.

It is due to this that the bush turkey is a common theme in Kyogle and this is reflected in the construction of the "Big Bush Turkey" and that the Kyogle Rugby League Football Club is known as the Kyogle Turkeys.

=== Flooding ===
In early January 2008, parts of Kyogle were subject to major flooding, when the Richmond River burst its banks after heavy rainfall around Kyogle and upstream, reaching heights of 18.1 metres (59 ft). This was the second worst flood in Kyogle on record, after the flood of 1954. The January 2008 event was approximately a 1 in 50 year event. The State Emergency Service evacuated 30 people from a caravan park in Kyogle and responded to two landslide incidents.

== Transport ==
Kyogle station is served by the main North Coast railway line between Sydney and Brisbane. A train from Sydney to Brisbane stops at 2:46am and a train from Brisbane to Sydney stops at 7:53am (only stops if there are booked passengers getting on or off at Kyogle). A short crossing loop used to be located at the passenger station, but when the loop was extended for 1,500-metre (4,900 ft)-long trains, the crossing loop was relocated to a more suitable – straighter – site outside town.

Further north along the railway line towards Brisbane, located at Cougal, is the Border Loop spiral, where the track loops 360 degrees and eventually passes over itself. This loop was constructed for trains to climb from the low side (NSW) to the high side (QLD) of the McPherson Range.

In 2012, Kyogle Council made a submission for a twice-daily train service, between Kyogle and Brisbane, which would benefit both the South East Queensland and the Kyogle regions, especially in tourism.

The nearest airports are Ballina Byron Gateway Airport, located 79 km (49 mi) south east and Gold Coast Airport, located 99 km (62 mi) north east of the town.

== Media ==
Radio stations that cover the town are ABC North Coast, River FM, Triple Z FM, and Richmond Valley Radio, a community based station.

Kyogle receives TV channels from SBS and ABC and the regional stations of Seven, Nine and 10 Northern NSW.

Local newspaper is served by The Northern Star.

== Demographics ==
According to the 2021 census of Population, there were 2,804 people in Kyogle.

- Aboriginal and Torres Strait Islander people made up 5.6% of the population.
- 82.5% of people were born in Australia and 85.8% of people spoke only English at home.
- The most common responses for religion were No Religion 34.7%, Catholic 19.3% and Anglican 14.1%.

According to the 2016 census of Population, there were 2,751 people in Kyogle.

- Aboriginal and Torres Strait Islander people made up 4.0% of the population.
- 82.4% of people were born in Australia and 87.4% of people spoke only English at home.
- The most common responses for religion were No Religion 24.1%, Catholic 22.3% and Anglican 19.1%.

== The Big Bush Turkey ==
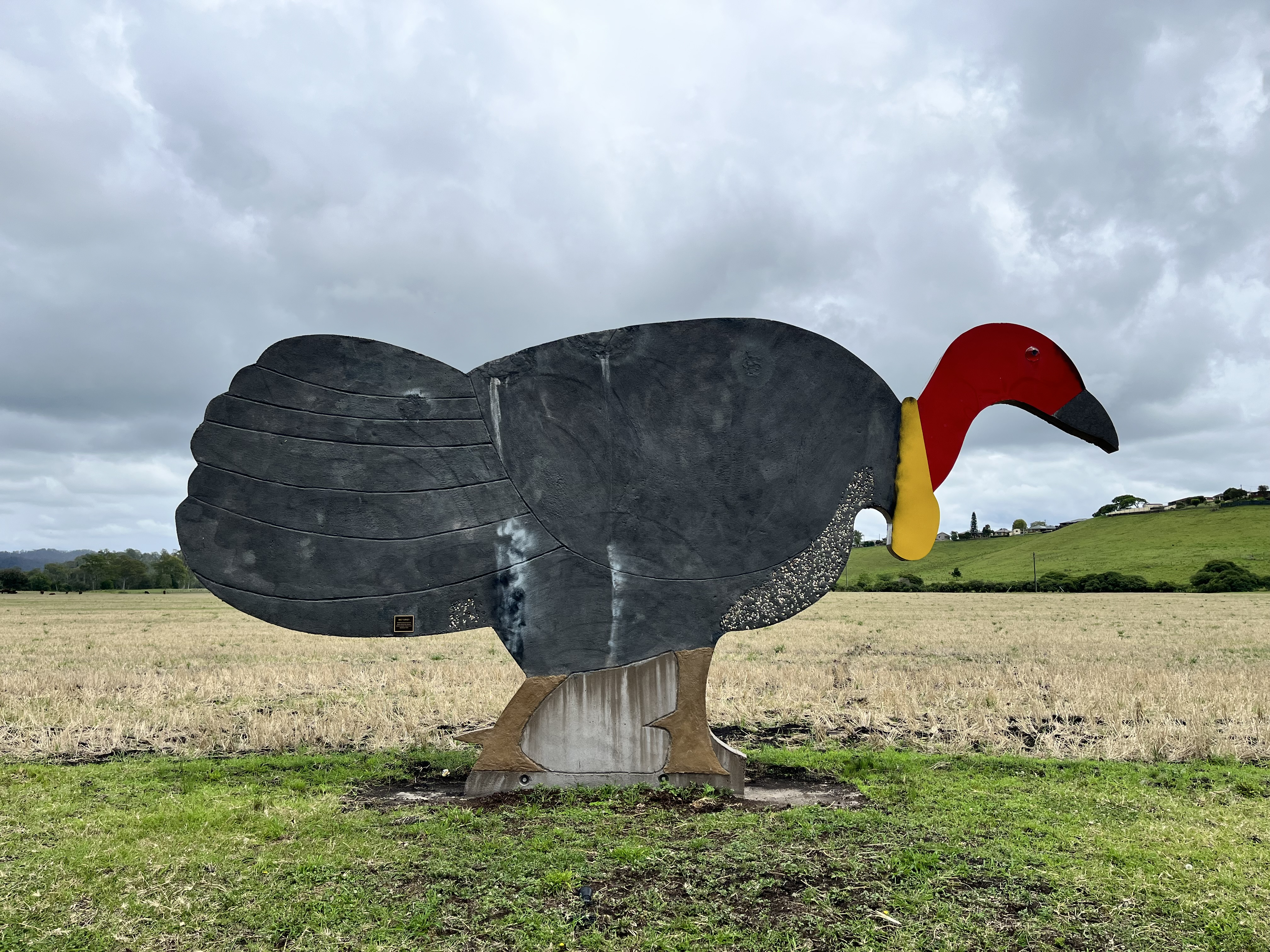
The Big Bush Turkey in Kyogle, NSW

Kyogle is home to one of Australia's big things in the form of the Big Bush Turkey. This is located at the southern end of the town on Summerland Way.

It was constructed by a Kyogle couple, John and Chrystine Graham, in 2018 and weighs 16 tonnes. It is 8.5 metres wide, 4 metres high and 20 centimetres thick.

It is sometimes called the Big Brush Turkey or the Big Scrub Turkey.

== NSW Tidy Towns winner ==
Kyogle won the "Young Legends" category award at the 2012 Australian Tidy Town Awards. One of the judges, Dick Olesinski, described how Kyogle's community encompasses a diverse range of projects that demonstrate the community's commitment to Tidy Towns and other related environmental and beautification programs, saying "Kyogle's Tidy Towns Committee continues to deliver active and enthusiastic promotion of the town, providing infrastructure and support of community activities."

== Notable people ==
- Terry Butler – rugby league player
- Susan Coyle – army officer
- Joyce Dennys – English painter
- Bob Dollin – politician
- Maxwell Dunlop – politician
- John Felton – canoeist
- Ian Fleming – Australian rules footballer
- Keith Fleming – Australian rules footballer
- Harold Frith – ornithologist
- Will Matthews – rugby league player
- Les McKeand – triple jumper and javelin thrower
- Athol McQueen – boxer
- Rod Milgate – painter and playwright
- Stan Munro - drag performer, actor, author and comedian
- Ken Nagas – rugby league player
- Bill Rixon – politician
- Nigel Roy – rugby league player
- Jack Scholes – New Zealand sailor
- Harold Stapleton – cricketer
- Shannon Walker – Former Australian rugby sevens and rugby league player

== Sporting clubs ==
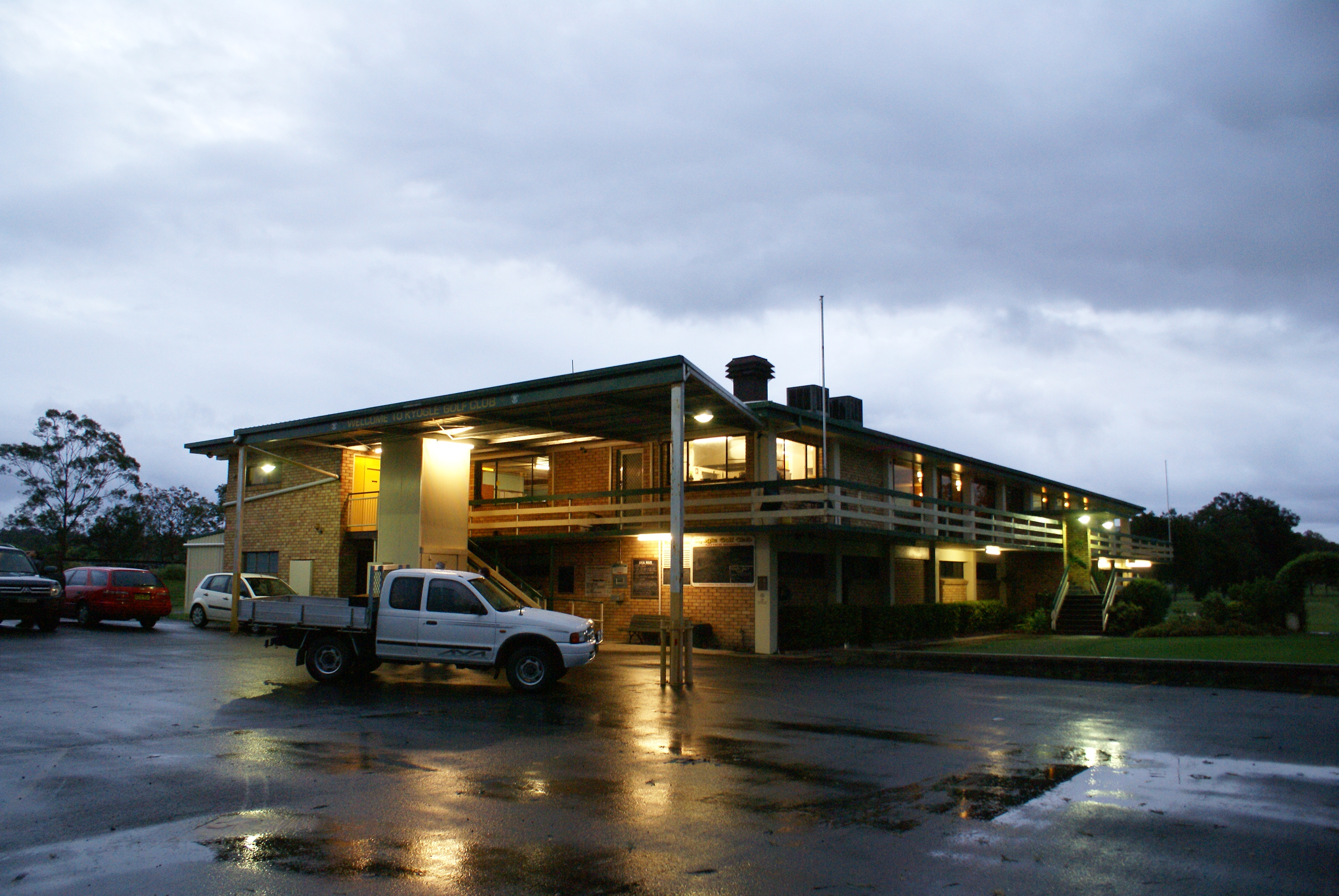
Kyogle Golf Club House

- Kyogle Bowling Club
- Kyogle Golf Club
- Kyogle Cockies Rugby Union Club
- Kyogle Netball Association
- Kyogle Pony Club
- Kyogle Turkeys Rugby League Club (Junior & Senior teams)
- Kyogle Little Athletics
- Kyogle Turkeys Touch Football Club
- Kyogle Soccer Club
- Kyogle Swimming club
- Kyogle Tennis Club
- Kyogle District Cricket Association.

== World Rally Championship ==
The 2009 World Rally Championship, also known as the 2009 Rally Australia, passed through the Kyogle area in 2009.
