= Bundjalung =

Bundjalung may refer to:

- Bundjalung people, an Aboriginal-Australian group
- Western Bundjalung people, an Aboriginal-Australian group
  - Wahlubal, their language
- Yugambeh-Bandjalangic peoples, a cultural bloc / polity of Aboriginal-Australians
  - Yugambeh-Bundjalung languages, their language family
