= Boondelbah Island =

Protected area in New South Wales, Australia

Boondelbah Nature Reserve
- IUCN category Ia (strict nature reserve)
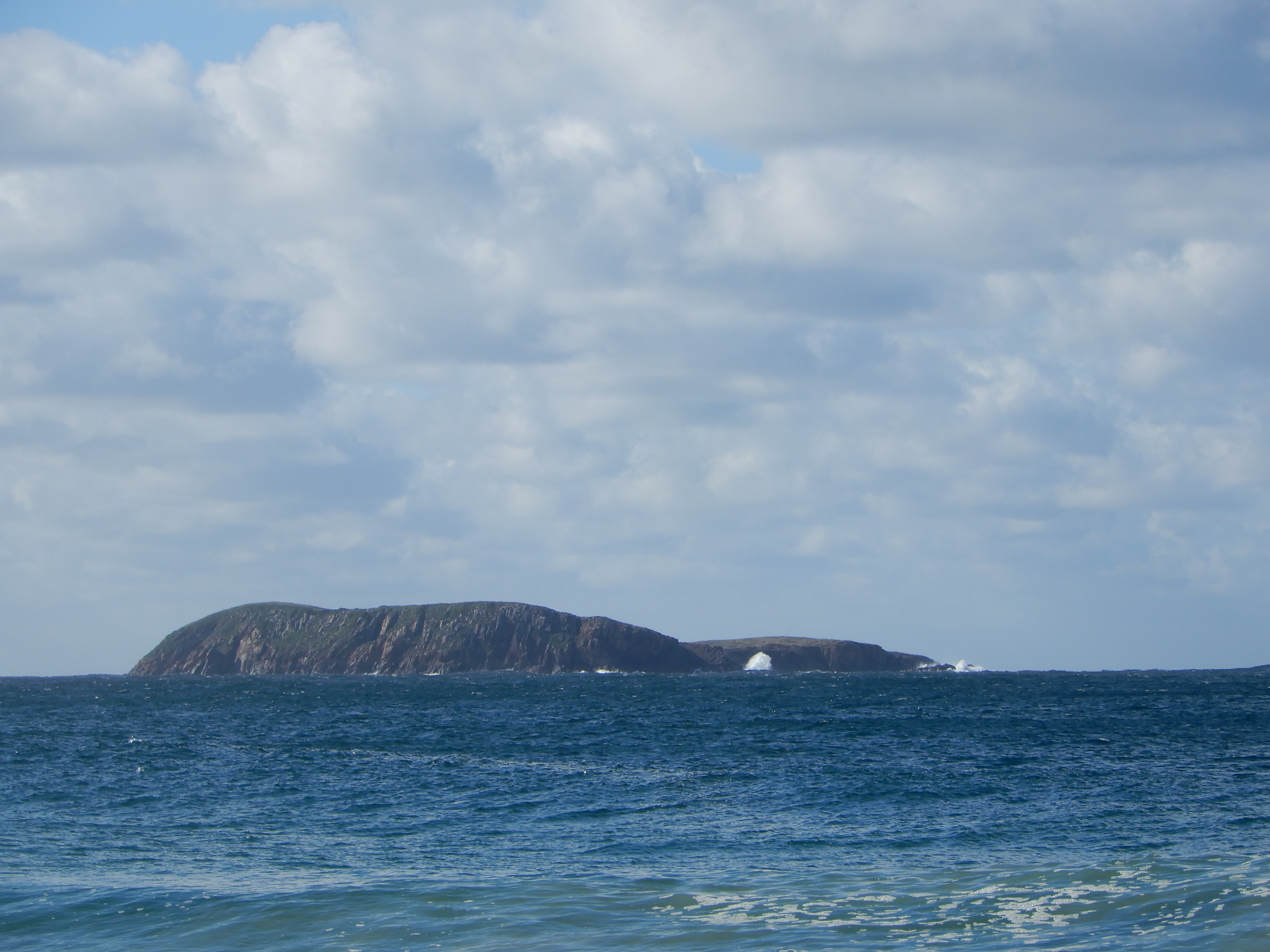
- Boondelbah Island, in 2024

- Location within New South Wales
- Location: New South Wales
- Nearest city: Shoal Bay
- Coordinates: 32°42′54″S 152°14′04″E
- Area: 14 ha (35 acres)
- Governing body: NSW National Parks & Wildlife Service

Boondelbah Island, also known as the Boondelbah Nature Reserve, is a protected nature reserve and uninhabited island lying 2 kilometres (1.2 mi) off the mouth of Port Stephens on the coast of New South Wales, Australia. The 14-hectare (35-acre) reserve and island is one of two breeding sites of the nominate subspecies of the threatened Gould's petrel and, with the nearby Cabbage Tree Island which hosts the principal colony, has been classified by BirdLife International as an Important Bird Area.

== Description ==
Boondelbah Island is a small, flat-topped, V-shaped island, surrounded by cliffs, about 600 by 400 metres (2,000 ft × 1,300 ft), with a maximum height of about 40 metres (130 ft). In contrast to rainforest-covered Cabbage Tree, Boondelbah is virtually treeless with the vegetation dominated by mat rush and coastal rosemary, with tussocks of paroo lily and knobby club rush. Prickly pear covers much of the cliff tops.

== Conservation ==
Both Boondelbah and Cabbage Tree Islands are gazetted nature reserves under the National Parks and Wildlife Act, 1974 (NSW), so protecting the islands' habitat from land uses incompatible with nature conservation. Access is only permitted for scientific and conservation purposes.

=== Fauna ===
Little penguins breed on Boondelbah Island and shearwaters also roost there.

==== Gould's petrel conservation management ====
Although the larger Cabbage Tree Island had been known for its breeding colony of Gould's petrels for many years, it was only in 1995 that a few breeding birds were found on Boondelbah. In order to establish a second colony, in February 1999 a hundred Gould's petrel chicks were translocated from Cabbage Tree to Boondelbah and placed in artificial nest boxes, with a further hundred being translocated in March 2000. Almost all the chicks fledged successfully.

== See also ==
- List of islands of New South Wales
- Protected areas of New South Wales
