= Yugambeh–Bandjalangic peoples =

Aboriginal Australian ethnolinguistic group

The Yugambeh–Bandjalangic peoples are an Aboriginal Australian ethnolinguistic group identified by their use of one of more of the Yugambeh–Bundjalung languages and shared cultural practices and histories. There are roughly 15 individual groups, who together form a wider cultural bloc or polity often described as Bundjalung or "Three Brothers Mob".

== Languages ==
The Yugambeh–Bandjalangic people speak is a branch of the Pama–Nyungan family.

=== Branches ===
The Yugambeh–Bandjalangic family is made of four branches:

  - Tweed–Albert language, also known as the Yugambeh language:
    - Yugambeh
    - Nganduwal
    - Ngarangwal
  - Condamine-Upper Clarence, also known as the Githabul language
    - Galibal
    - Dinggabal
    - Gidabal
    - Geynan
  - Lower Richmond, also known as the (Eastern) Bundjalung/Bandjalang language
    - Ngangbal
    - Bandjalang
    - Wiyabal
    - Minyangbal
  - Middle Clarence, also known as the (Western) Bundjalung language
    - Wahlubal
    - Bundjalung
    - Birihn
    - Wehlubal

== History ==
=== Land claims ===
Descendants of two tribes within the modern Bundjalung federation, namely the Githabul and the Western Bundjalung people have had their native title rights recognized, respectively in 2007 and 2017.

== Religious beliefs ==
The Yugambeh–Bandjalangic peoples believe the spirits of wounded warriors are present within the mountains, their injuries having manifested themselves as scars on the mountainside, and thunderstorms in the mountains recall the sounds of those warriors' battles. Wollumbin itself is the site at which one of the chief warriors lies, and it is said his face can still be seen in the mountain's rocks when viewed from the north.

== Notable people ==
Notable Bundjalung people include:

- Bronwyn Bancroft (born 1958) is an Australian artist, notable for being amongst the first Australian fashion designers invited to show her work in Paris. Born in Tenterfield, New South Wales, and trained in Canberra and Sydney, Bancroft worked as a fashion designer, and is an artist, illustrator, and arts administrator.
- Troy Cassar-Daley – born at Grafton to an Aboriginal mother and a Maltese–Australian father.
- Joyce Clague - political activist
- Ruby Langford Ginibi – author, lecturer in Aboriginal history, culture and politics, whose grandfather "Sam" Anderson, in a game of cricket in 1928 at Lismore, became one of only two Aboriginal cricketers to ever get Donald Bradman out, for a duck.
- Anthony Mundine – professional boxer and multiple-time world champion. He is also a former New South Wales State of Origin representative footballer who played for St. George Illawarra Dragons and Brisbane Broncos in the Australian NRL. Before his move to boxing he was the highest paid player in the NRL.
- Warren Mundine – a former national president of the Australian Labor Party and also a director of the Australian Indigenous Education Foundation.
- Mark Olive – also known as the "Black Olive" & "Bush food crusader", a Wollongong born chef who trained in Europe, with over twenty years cooking experience, and he has his own pay TV indigenous cooking show, The Outback Cafe and is also the author of cookbooks such as Olive's Outback Cafe: A Taste of Australia.
- Johnny Jarrett (Patten) – former Australian Bantamweight boxing champion (1958–1962).
- Wes Patten – actor, television host, and former NRL player with the South Sydney Rabbitohs, St.George Dragons, Balmain Tigers and Gold Coast Chargers. Roles in television and film include playing opposite Cate Blanchett in Heartland (1994) and Hugo Weaving in Dirt Water Dynasty (1988). Other roles include stints on A Country Practice, Wills & Burke, and G.P.
- Albert Torrens – a former international rugby league footballer who played for the Manly-Warringah Sea Eagles, Northern Eagles and St. George Illawarra Dragons in the Australian NRL and for the Huddersfield Giants in the Super League.

== Sources ==
- Langford Ginibi, Ruby (15 November 1995). "Australian Biography: Ruby Langford Ginibi" (Interview). Interviewed by Robin Hughes. National Film and Sound Archive.
- Steele, John Gladstone (1984). Aboriginal Pathways: in Southeast Queensland and the Richmond River. University of Queensland Press. ISBN 978-0-702-25742-1.
- "Githabul People's native title determination: North-eastern New South Wales" (PDF). National Native Title Tribunal. 29 November 2007. Archived from the original (PDF) on 1 June 2011.
- "Troy Cassar-Daley". Talking Heads. Australian Broadcasting Corporation. 4 May 2009. Archived from the original on 18 October 2010.
