= Digby Moran =

Australian Aboriginal artist (1948–2020)

- Born: Albert Digby Moran; 1948; Cabbage Tree Island, New South Wales, Australia
- Died: January 14, 2020 (aged 71–72); Lismore, New South Wales, Australia
- Education: New South Wales TAFE
- Known for: Painting
- Notable work: Berlin Aboriginal Art Gallery (2001/2); Vienna New Media Gallery (2003); Museum Hamelyn, Germany: Energy of the Earth (2004); Duisburg, Germany (2009); Emmerich, Germany (2009); Memories of the Island (2006); I Saw The Sun - East Coast (2007); New South Wales Parliament Exhibition (2016); Growing Up on the Island (2018)
- Movement: Australian Aboriginal Art

Albert Digby Moran (1948–2020) was an Australian Aboriginal artist. His work derived inspiration from his Bundjalung ancestors in the north of New South Wales, Australia, where he remains one of the Northern Rivers' most recognised artists.

== Life ==
Digby Moran grew up on Cabbage Tree Island on the Richmond River in New South Wales, Australia. His father was a member of the Dunghutti race and his mother a Bundjalung. His grandfather, Robert Moran, was a wood carver and from an early age Digby worked with him, making boomerangs and walking sticks. In his early adult years he worked as an agricultural cane cutter and also as a boxer with Jimmy Sharman's touring troupe. Eventually Moran returned to that first love of his people's art and completed a TAFE arts course in 1991. After a nationally and internationally recognised career as a visual artist, Moran died in Lismore in January 2020.

== Work ==
An early work, 'Lizard and Snake' was made for the Lismore branch of the Aboriginal and Torres Strait Islander Commission, depicting the creation story of the Goanna headland at Evans Head. In 2006, Moran held an exhibition Memories of the island exhibited at the Tweed River Art Gallery. Moran's work was represented in the I saw the sun - east coast exhibition at the Lismore Regional Gallery in 2007 together with Jenny Fraser, Frances Belle Parker, Fiona Foley, Ian Abdulla and Vincent Serico.

Most of Moran's work was lost in the Lismore floods of 2017. However in 2018 the Lismore Art Gallery presented an exhibition of his work, 'Growing Up on the Island' which enhanced his reputation as one of Australia's foremost Indigenous artists. He was commissioned to paint murals by Woolworths in River Street, Ballina, in 2014; and at St Joseph's School, Woodburn, in 2019. He was granted a solo exhibition at the New South Wales Parliament in 2010.

Internationally, Digby Moran exhibited at:

- Berlin Aboriginal Art Gallery (2001/2)
- Vienna New Media Gallery (2003)
- Museum Hamelyn, Germany: 'Energy of the Earth' (2004)
- Duisburg, Germany (2009)
- Emmerich, Germany (2009)

Digby was a frequent guest at schools, working with children in art education. In later years he worked in a support role at the Namatjira Haven, a drug and alcohol rehabilitation centre.

== Awards ==
- People's Choice Award, National Aboriginal and Islander Telstra Art Award, Northern Territory Art Gallery, Darwin (2000)
- Finalist, The New South Wales Parliament Aboriginal Art Prize 2011 and 2012
