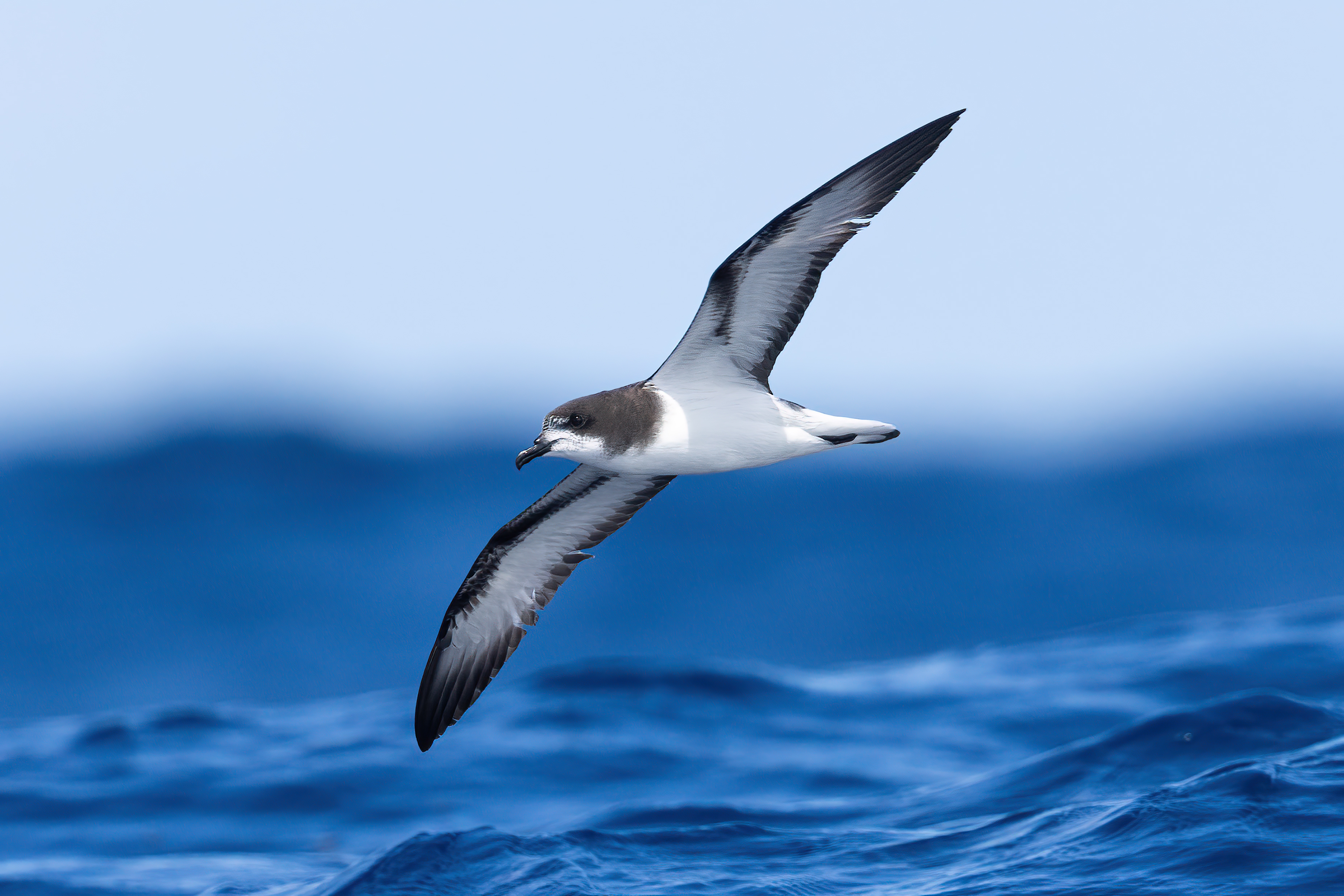

Conservation status
- Vulnerable (IUCN 3.1)

Scientific classification
- Kingdom: Animalia
- Phylum: Chordata
- Class: Aves
- Order: Procellariiformes
- Family: Procellariidae
- Genus: Pterodroma
- Species: P. leucoptera

Binomial name
- Pterodroma leucoptera (Gould, 1844)

Synonyms
- Procellaria leucoptera Gould, 1844 Rhantistes velox Bonaparte, 1856 (nomen novum) Cookilaria cookii byroni Mathews, 1916 Pterodroma cookii masafuerae Lönnberg, 1920

= Gould's petrel =

Species of bird

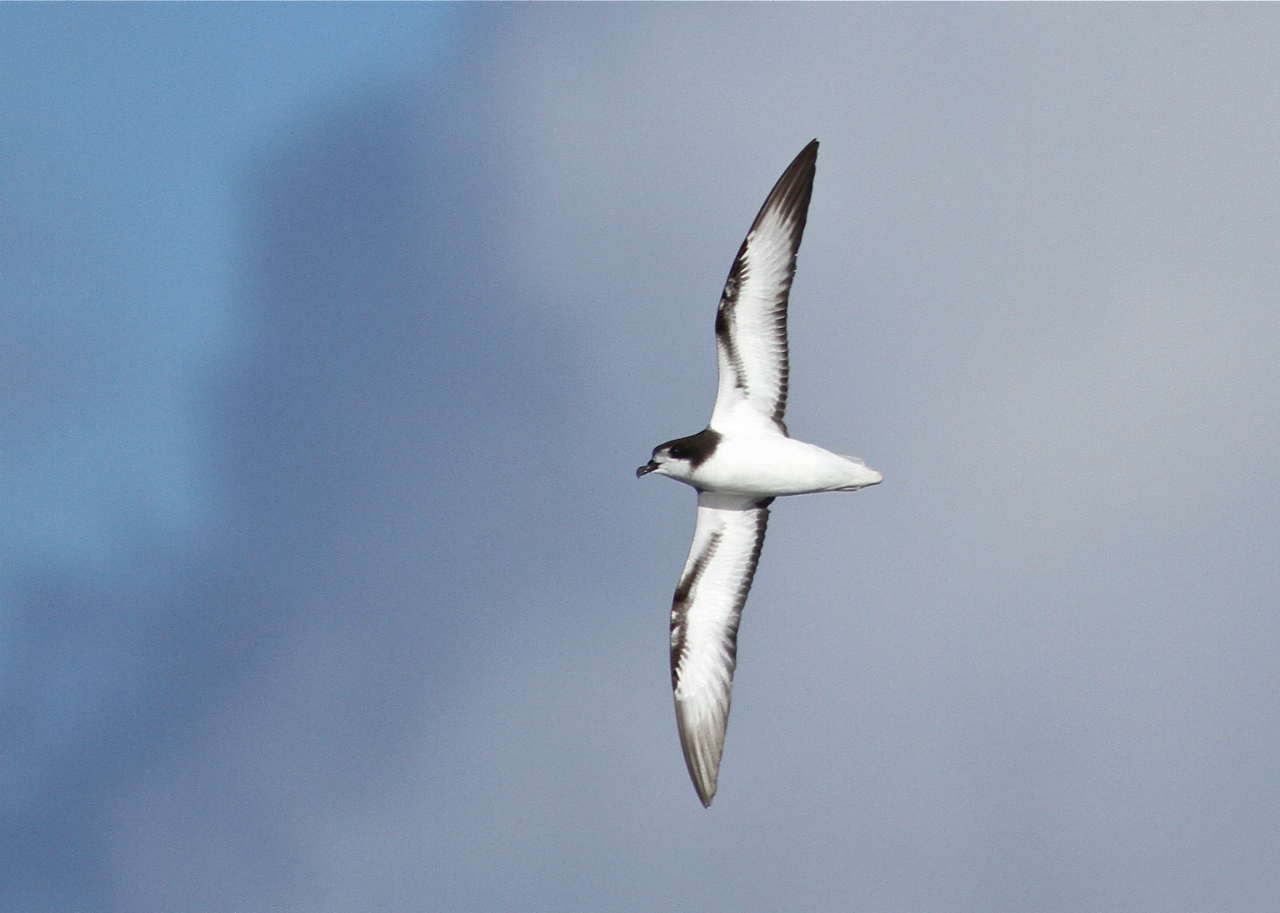

Gould's petrel (Pterodroma leucoptera) is a species of seabird in the family Procellariidae. The common name commemorates the English ornithologist and bird artist John Gould (1804–1881).

== Description ==
Gould's petrel is a small gadfly petrel, white below and dark brown and grey above. The species is classified within the subgenus Cookilaria, all members of which have a dark M pattern across the upper wings. Gould's petrel has long narrow wings, a short rounded tail and the head is noticeably dark, with a white forehead and face. Gould's petrel is 30 cm in length with a wingspan of 70 cm and weighs 180–200 g. Males are slightly larger than females.

== Taxonomy ==
There are two subspecies of Gould's petrel. The nominate subspecies (Pterodroma leucoptera leucoptera) breeds on several small islands off the New South Wales coast in Australia, but primarily on Cabbage Tree Island (John Gould Nature Reserve). The other subspecies (P. l. caledonica) breeds on New Caledonia and differs from the nominate subspecies in being slightly larger in morphological measurements, and having a more robust bill, paler back and sides of the breast, reduced pigmentation on the underside of the wing, and a white or mainly white inner vane of the outer rectrix.

Some authorities regard the collared petrel (P. brevipes) as another subspecies of Gould's petrel and some raise the New Caledonian petrel to species status and regard the three taxa as a superspecies.

== Name ==
Gould's petrel is sometimes known as the white-winged petrel, but as other closely related gadfly petrels have considerably more white on the underwing, the former name is preferred. Gould's petrel is the name chosen by W.B. Alexander in his classic work Birds of the Ocean.

Gould described this bird in 1844, naming it Cook's petrel (Procellaria cookii) after James Cook. In his 1865 Handbook he changed the name to white-winged petrel (Aestrelata leucoptera).

Today it is known as Gould's petrel (Pterodroma leucoptera).

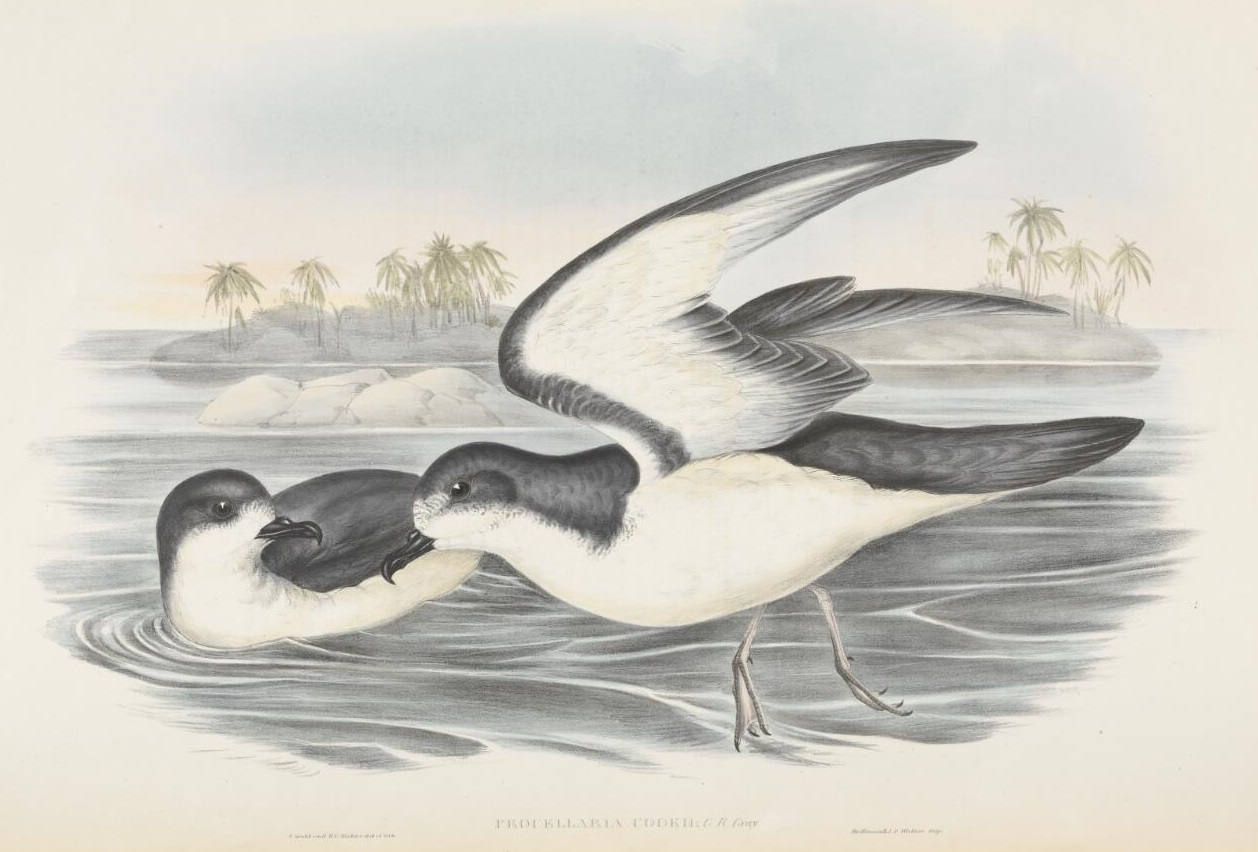
Gould's petrel illustrated by John Gould with Cabbage Tree Island in the background

== Distribution ==
Gould's petrels spend most of their life at sea and come ashore only to breed.

Prior to the 1990s, it was thought that the Australian subspecies of Gould's petrel bred only on Cabbage Tree Island off Port Stephens in New South Wales. After the discovery of breeding pairs on neighbouring Boondelbah Island, translocation of 200 chicks in 1999 and 2000 has established a small satellite colony which breeds in artificial nest boxes that were installed prior to the first translocation. In December 2009, just one month after it had been confirmed that rabbits had been eliminated from Cabbage Tree Island, one single Gould's petrel was found incubating an egg on another nearby island, Broughton Island.

Today, the nominate subspecies breeds on at least five islands off New South Wales (Cabbage Tree Island, Boondelbah Island, Broughton Island, Little Broughton Island, and Montague Island). The New Caledonian subspecies breeds on New Caledonia in steep forested valleys on the central mountain chain, from 350 to 500 metres above sea level between Mountains Dzumac and Poya. There is also a small colony on Raivavae in French Polynesia.

Both subspecies forage in the Tasman Sea during the breeding season and may venture as far west as the Indian Ocean south of south-western Western Australia before lying. After breeding, Gould's petrel migrates to the central (P. l. leucoptera) and eastern (P. l. caledonica) Pacific Ocean.

Gould's petrels (of unknown subspecies) were sighted in December 1994 in waters south of Western Australia. It is deduced that these were not breeding birds, because in December breeding birds are incubating (see Life history below), and these waters are too far from the breeding colonies for a foraging trip.

== Diet ==
Little is known about the diet or feeding behaviour of Gould's petrels. We do know that they eat small cephalopods and fish, and that variation in foraging success is substantial.

Procellariiforms go without food during often lengthy incubation shifts.

== Life history ==
Gadfly petrels have relatively long breeding seasons. They are generally monogamous and form long-term pair bonds.

While most petrels nest in burrows, as do the Gould's petrels on New Caledonia, the Australian subspecies of Gould's petrel does not. On Cabbage Tree Island, they nest amongst rocks and boulders, under fallen palm fronds, in hollow trunks of fallen palms and between buttresses of fig trees.

On Cabbage Tree Island, birds arrive in mid-October to secure their nest site and reunite with their mate. In November, they return to sea for 2–3 weeks (the 'pre-laying exodus'). The single egg (which is not replaced if lost) is laid between 18 November and 10 December. Incubation is undertaken by both parents and takes 6–7 weeks. Males undertake the first shift, which can be as long as 17 days. Females then take over for a shorter shift. Finally, males take the final shift until the egg hatches, usually in January. The chick reaches a maximum body mass that is often more than 130% of adult body mass. The young fledge from April to May at 80–100 days of age and a body mass of 160–180 g.

The age at which Gould's petrels commence breeding is unknown. The youngest bird of the Australian subspecies known to breed was 12 years of age. Young birds are thought to spend the first 5–6 years at sea before starting to breed. However, during this time, they do return to their natal breeding colony to establish pair bonds and to learn courtship and breeding skills.

The longevity of Gould's petrel is unknown. The oldest known member of the Australian subspecies was at least 23 years old.

== Population decline ==
In the early 1990s the breeding population of the Australian subspecies was fewer than 250 pairs. Breeding success was less than 20% and fewer than 50 young fledged each year. Each year, more adults died than chicks fledged successfully. In 1992, scientists estimated that the population had declined by 26% over the previous 22 years.

Research revealed that the major problems threatening processes were:

- sticky fruit of the birdlime tree (Pisonia umbellifera) which immobilised birds;
- predation by pied currawongs (Strepera graculina);
- habitat degradation caused by grazing of European rabbits (Oryctolagus cuniculus). Rabbits had eaten the undergrowth, allowing sticky birdlime fruit to fall to the ground, so birds, both adults and chicks, were exposed to fruit which would otherwise have been entangled in shrubbery.

== Management on Cabbage Tree Island ==
Population decline was unsustainable and intervention was required. In 1993, birdlime trees in the nesting colony were removed and pied currawongs were culled. Rabbits were eradicated from the island in 1997. Fledging success increased from fewer than 50 to more than 450 per annum and the number of breeding adults increased to over 1,000 pairs.

Removal of Ceodes umbellifera, (syn. Pisonia umbellifera) seedlings within the breeding colonies and culling of pied currawongs is undertaken periodically. Annual surveys estimate the size of the breeding population, breeding success and the number of fledglings produced. Because birds were monitored closely, there was concern that ornithologists' intrusion could upset the birds and affect breeding success. However, this does not appear to be the case. In one study conducted in 2000/01, the breeding success of birds handled regularly during incubation was higher than for the colony as a whole.

Having just one population was deemed an unacceptable risk, so nest boxes were developed and chicks were translocated to nearby Boondelbah Island. Most seabirds are strongly philopatric, so translocating chicks is difficult. Young must be moved before fledging. They are taken away from parental care and fed artificially. Gould's petrels breed less synchronously than many other seabirds: each stage of egg-laying, hatching and fledging takes place over a period of 6–7 weeks. Scientists had to determine the optimum time to translocate chicks: young enough so that they had not yet imprinted on their natal site but old enough to maximise survival in the absence of parental care.

== Conservation status ==
Active conservation management for the Australian subspecies of Gould's petrel has removed all land-based threats to the subspecies and the number of islands occupied has increased. However, since 2015, the number of breeding pairs and breeding success at Cabbage Tree Island, where 90% of the population breeds, have declined by 20%.

At the same time, the population of the New Caledonian subspecies was estimated at 10,000 individuals and decreasing. However, this number is no more than an estimate and scientists do not have high confidence that it is correct.

The New Caledonian subspecies is also classified as vulnerable because of its restricted geographic breeding range.

== Threats ==
The main threats to the nominate subspecies are the introduction of feral predators (cats (Felis catus), black rats (Rattus rattus), foxes (Vulpes vulpes) or dogs (Canis familiaris)) or wildfire, particularly in December when birds are incubating. Because of their chosen precarious nesting habits, accidental egg breakage is not unusual.

The major threat to the New Caledonian subspecies is introduced predators within the breeding colonies. Introduced pigs (Sus scrofa) dig up burrows and black rats prey on birds and eggs. In addition, adults are killed at night when they fly into lights on Nouméa.

Threats to Gould's petrels at sea are unknown, though they are not known to be affected directly by long-line fishing operations.
