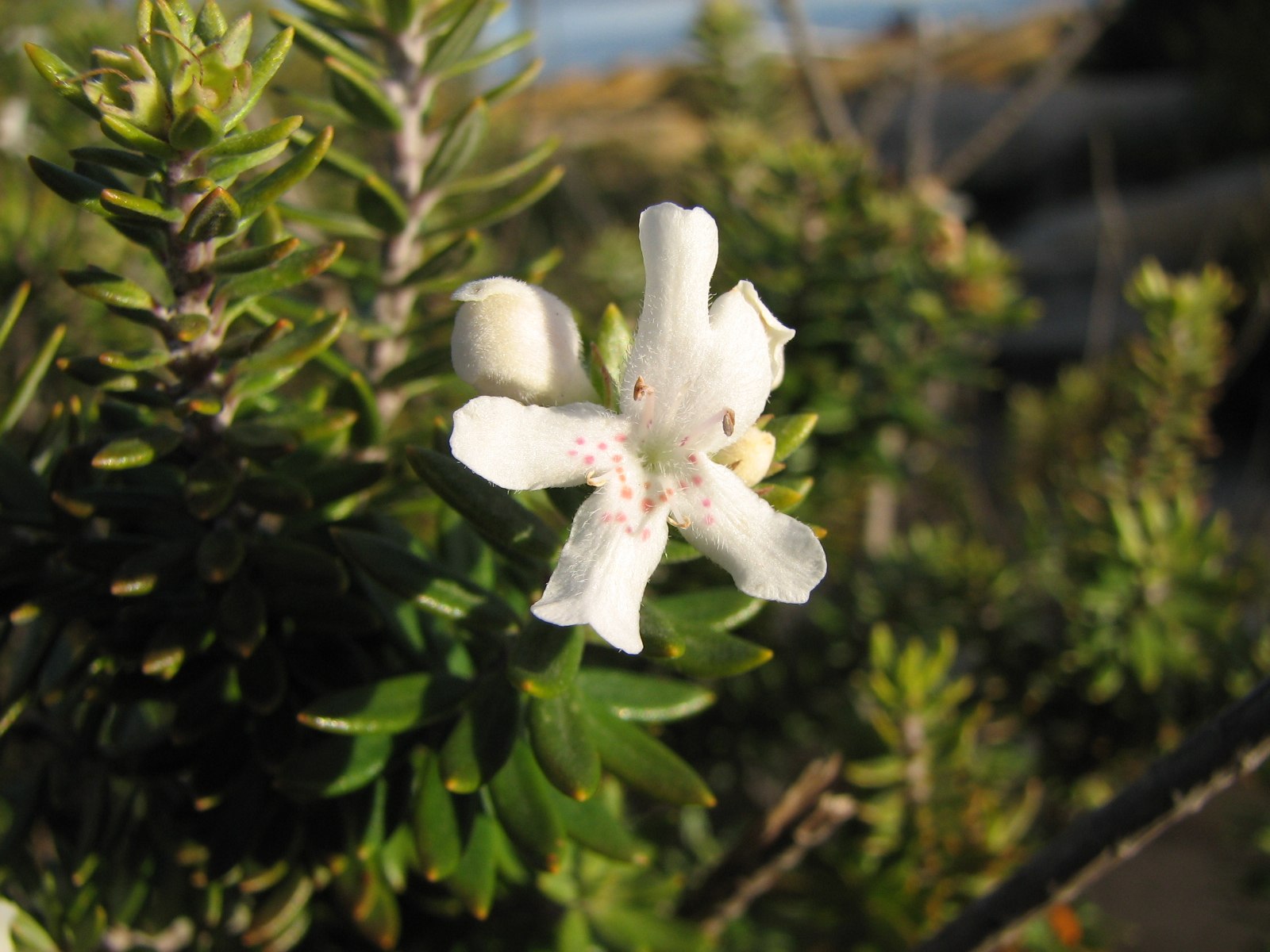

Scientific classification
- Kingdom: Plantae
- Clade: Tracheophytes
- Clade: Angiosperms
- Clade: Eudicots
- Clade: Asterids
- Order: Lamiales
- Family: Lamiaceae
- Genus: Westringia
- Species: W. fruticosa

Binomial name
- Westringia fruticosa (Willd.) Druce

= Westringia fruticosa =

Species of shrub

Westringia fruticosa, the coastal rosemary or coastal westringia, is a shrub that grows near the coast in eastern Australia.

== Description ==
The flowers are white, hairy and have the upper petal divided into two lobes. They also have orange-to-purply spots on their bottom half. This shrub is very tough and grows on cliffs right next to the ocean.

== Cultivation ==
The plant's tolerance to a variety of soils, the neatly whorled leaves and all-year flowering make it very popular in cultivation. It (or its cultivar(s)) is a recipient of the Royal Horticultural Society's Award of Garden Merit.

== Gallery ==
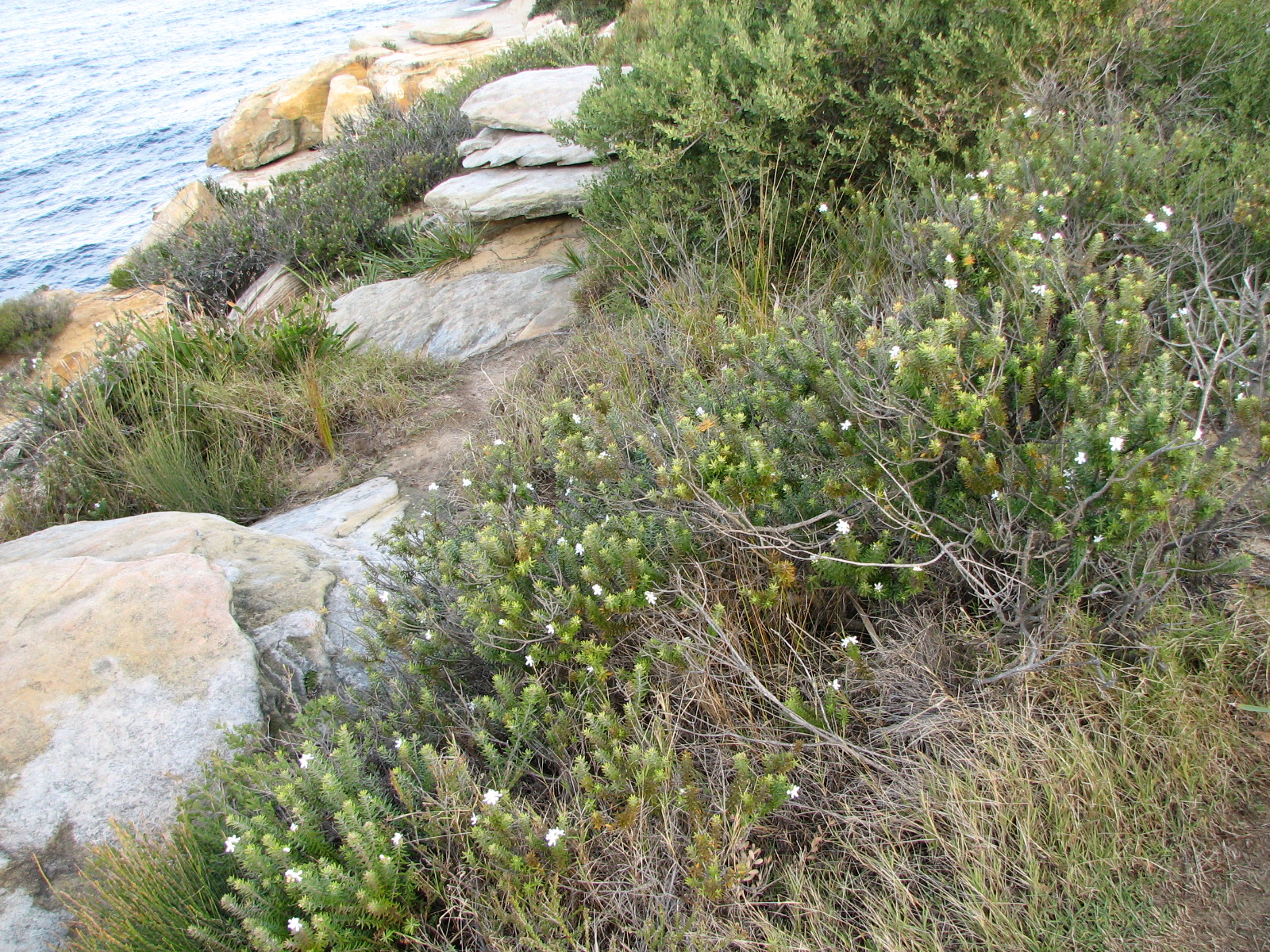
Growing on exposed cliffs in Coogee, Sydney

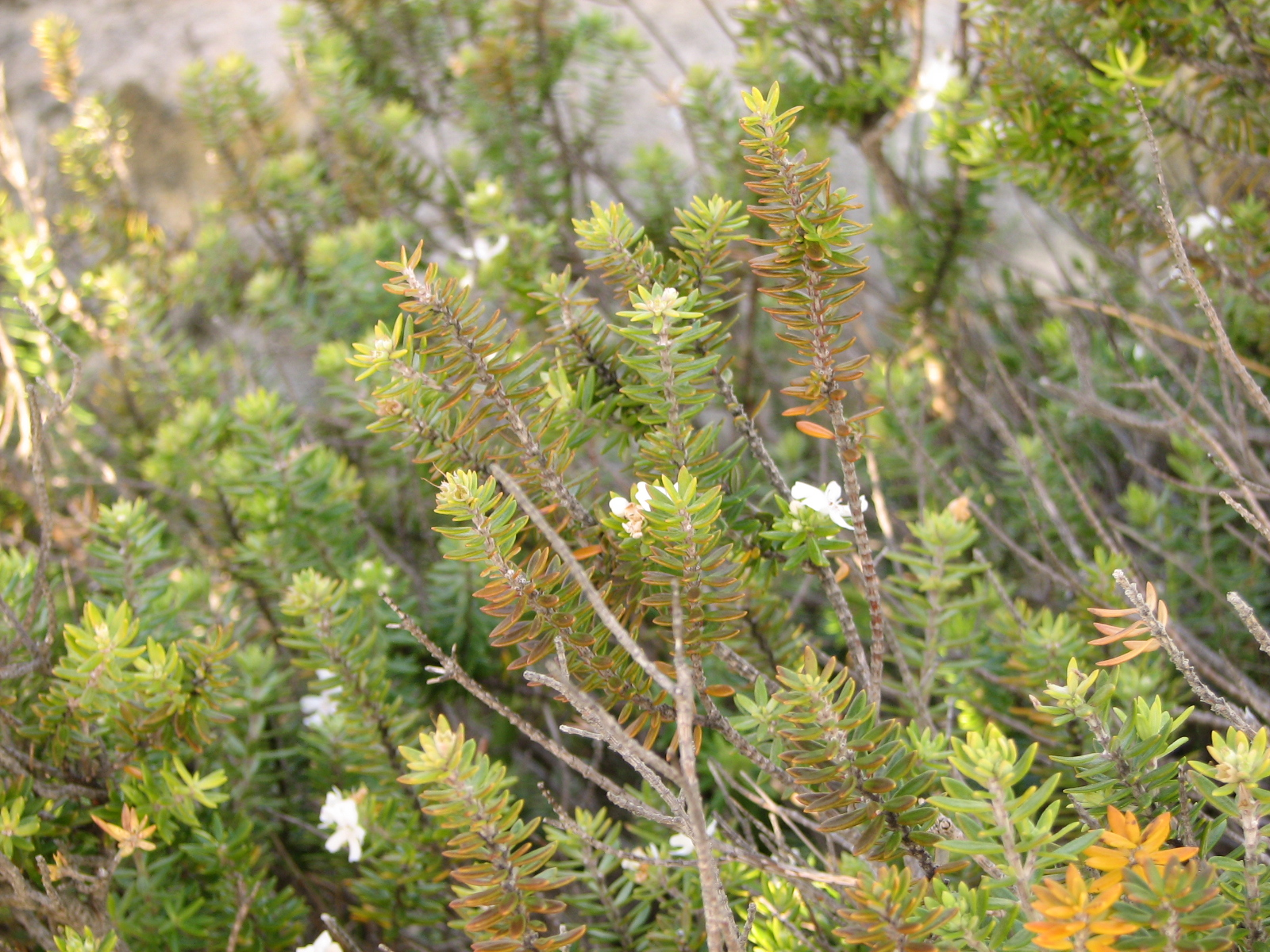

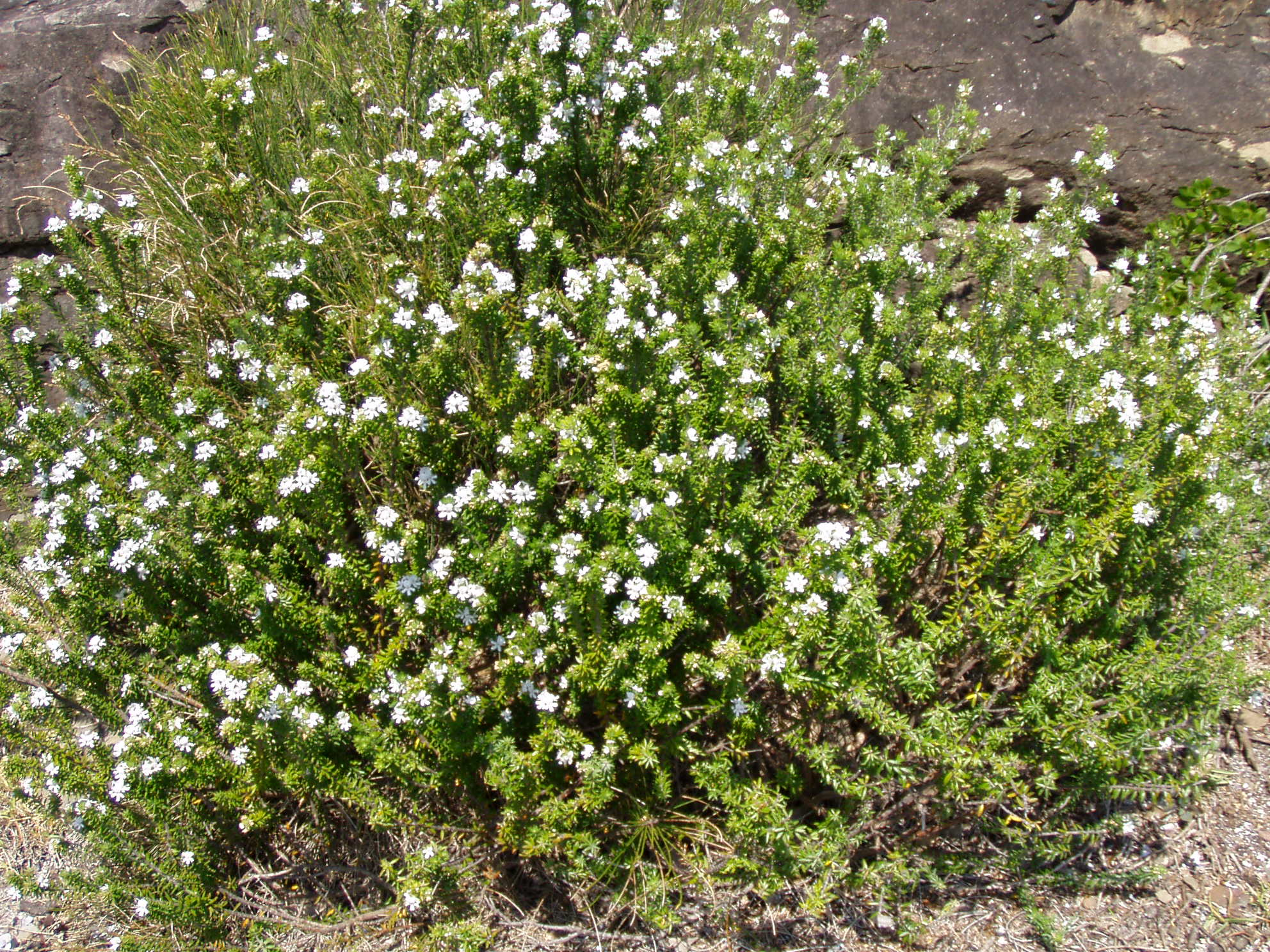
