= Tabulam =

- Town
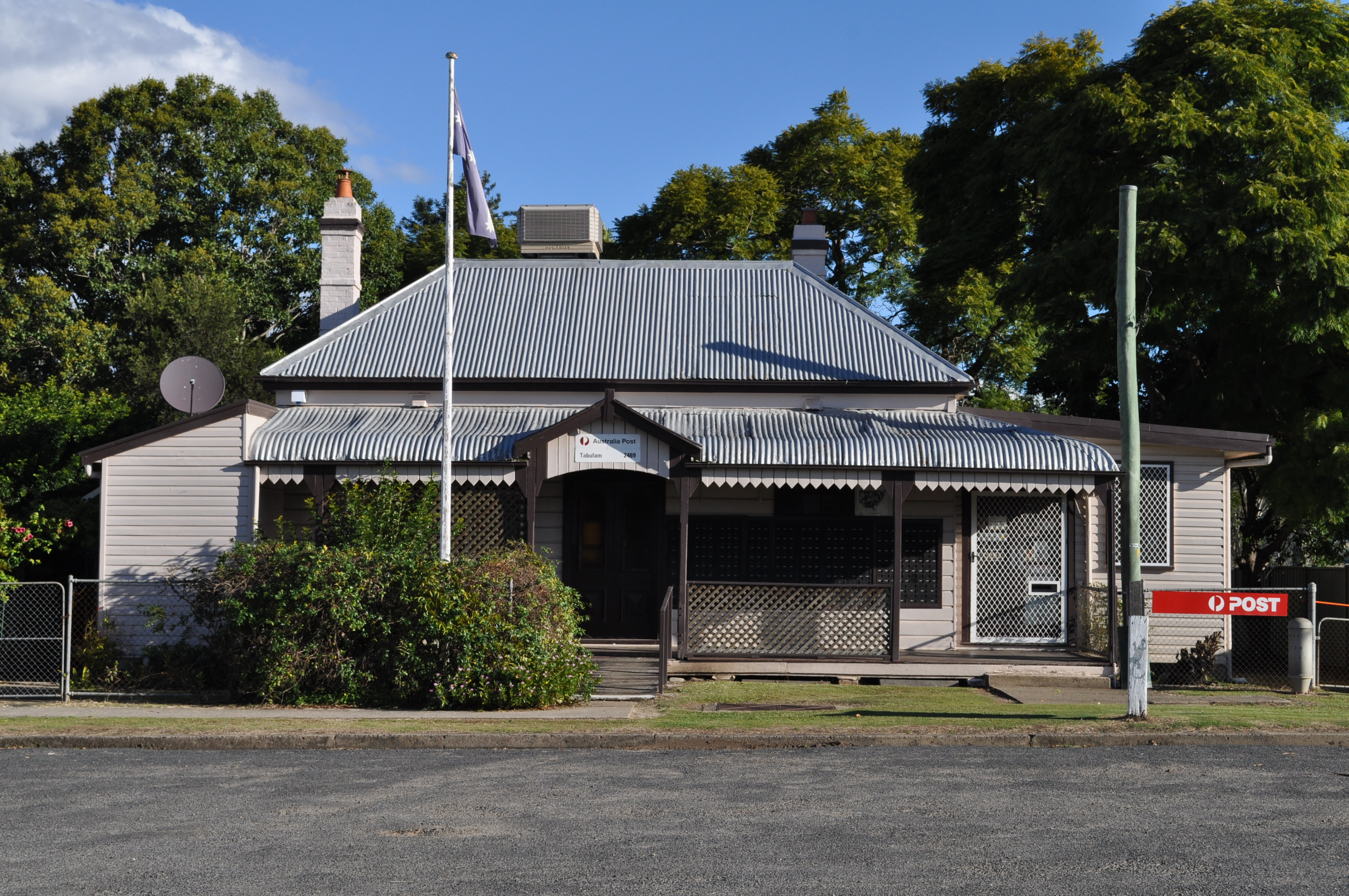
- Tabulam Post Office, Court Street

- Coordinates: 28°53′00″S 152°34′00″E
- Country: Australia
- State: New South Wales
- LGAs: Kyogle Council; Tenterfield Shire

Government
  - State electorate: Lismore
  - Federal divisions: New England; Page
- Elevation: 130 m (430 ft)

Population
  - Total: 470 (2016 census)
- Postcode: 2469
- County: Drake
- Parish: Tabulam

Tabulam is a rural village in the far north-east of New South Wales, Australia, 800 kilometres from the state capital, Sydney. Tabulam is located on the Bruxner Highway (Highway 44) between Tenterfield and Casino and on the Clarence River. According to the 2016 census, there were 470 people living in Tabulam. The main village is administered by Kyogle Council, while the section of Tabulam west of the Clarence River is part of Tenterfield Shire.

== Etymology ==
The name Tabulam is derived from Bundjalung Dahbalam.

== History ==
Originally, Tabulam and the surrounding farm and bushland were inhabited by Bundjalung people of which many still inhabit the town and surrounding area.

British colonisation of the land first occurred in 1840 when pastoral squatters Peter Cunningham Pagan and his brother-in-law William Tucker Evans chose the site for a sheep station. The forced displacement of the local Bundjalung from their lands led to a period of frontier conflict. On 24 April 1841, Pagan was speared through the heart from the other side of the river, by a Wahlabul Tribe warrior who had waited in ambush, after a failed attempt by Pagan to shoot a group of Bundjalung people who had taken items from his homestead shack. The killing of this well-known pastoralist prompted a lengthy series of reprisals against the local Bundjalung clans led by Henry Oakes, the regional crown lands commissioner. With his Border Police troopers and several armed volunteers including local squatters Edward Ogilvie and John Mylne, Oakes set out on a three-stage punitive expedition which resulted in the killing of at least 15 Bundjalung people and the destruction of five Aboriginal camp-sites. During these raids Ogilvie and Oakes also kidnapped six children. Conflict in the upper reaches of the Clarence River continued up until at least the late 1860s; but around Tabulam was not an issue of serious consequence after the arrival of the Chauvels in 1848. The Chauvels and the Wahlabul people of the Bundjalung Nation lived in harmony, and Harry Chauvel of Light Horse fame in WWI was mentored by the tribe's future King, Harry Mundine, all his young life. Mundine taught the Chauvel boys to love and respect the lands and all creatures upon it; how to read the rugged lands and to negotiate them safely. Harry and his siblings spoke the Wahlabul dialect and became great horsemen under Mundine's mentoring around 'Tabulam Station' and on the long journeys to school (they had to ride to the coast with Mundine, camping along the way for two nights, as they made their way to catch the steamboat from Grafton to Sydney to get to school - Primary School in Goulburn was followed by Secondary Schooling at Sydney Grammar, then Toowoomba Grammar). Learning Aboriginal folk lore and laws was part of those journeys.

Tabulam is the birthplace in 1865 of Lieutenant General Sir Harry Chauvel of the Australian Light Horse.

During World War II, tank traps were built in the area near Paddys Flat, to repel a potential armoured attack. More of the tank traps became visible after flooding of the Clarence River in 2011.

== Climate ==
Climate data for Tabulam (1991–2020 normals, extremes 1970–present)
| Month | Jan | Feb | Mar | Apr | May | Jun | Jul | Aug | Sep | Oct | Nov | Dec | Year |
|---|---|---|---|---|---|---|---|---|---|---|---|---|---|
| Record high °C (°F) | 39.8 (103.6) | 39.7 (103.5) | 37.3 (99.1) | 31.1 (88.0) | 28.4 (83.1) | 25.3 (77.5) | 24.2 (75.6) | 32.2 (90.0) | 34.9 (94.8) | 37.0 (98.6) | 39.2 (102.6) | 38.3 (100.9) | 39.8 (103.6) |
| Mean daily maximum °C (°F) | 27.8 (82.0) | 26.5 (79.7) | 25.0 (77.0) | 22.5 (72.5) | 19.4 (66.9) | 16.9 (62.4) | 16.9 (62.4) | 18.8 (65.8) | 22.3 (72.1) | 24.4 (75.9) | 26.1 (79.0) | 27.2 (81.0) | 22.8 (73.0) |
| Daily mean °C (°F) | 22.6 (72.7) | 21.9 (71.4) | 20.5 (68.9) | 18.0 (64.4) | 15.1 (59.2) | 12.7 (54.9) | 12.3 (54.1) | 13.6 (56.5) | 16.6 (61.9) | 18.6 (65.5) | 20.4 (68.7) | 21.7 (71.1) | 17.8 (64.0) |
| Mean daily minimum °C (°F) | 17.4 (63.3) | 17.2 (63.0) | 16.0 (60.8) | 13.6 (56.5) | 10.8 (51.4) | 8.5 (47.3) | 7.6 (45.7) | 8.3 (46.9) | 10.9 (51.6) | 12.8 (55.0) | 14.7 (58.5) | 16.3 (61.3) | 12.8 (55.0) |
| Record low °C (°F) | 11.6 (52.9) | 10.4 (50.7) | 8.6 (47.5) | 5.2 (41.4) | 1.4 (34.5) | 0.2 (32.4) | 0.0 (32.0) | 0.0 (32.0) | 2.3 (36.1) | 3.5 (38.3) | 5.5 (41.9) | 6.8 (44.2) | 0.0 (32.0) |
| Average precipitation mm (inches) | 178.4 (7.02) | 179.6 (7.07) | 156.5 (6.16) | 69.7 (2.74) | 82.7 (3.26) | 63.7 (2.51) | 34.5 (1.36) | 40.5 (1.59) | 34.6 (1.36) | 93.8 (3.69) | 114.8 (4.52) | 146.2 (5.76) | 1,194.9 (47.04) |
| Average precipitation days (≥ 1 mm) | 12.6 | 13.2 | 13.7 | 9.1 | 7.9 | 7.0 | 5.5 | 4.5 | 5.2 | 8.5 | 9.8 | 11.9 | 108.9 |
| Average dew point °C (°F) | 17.7 (63.9) | 17.8 (64.0) | 16.6 (61.9) | 14.0 (57.2) | 10.6 (51.1) | 8.3 (46.9) | 6.7 (44.1) | 6.7 (44.1) | 9.5 (49.1) | 12.1 (53.8) | 14.4 (57.9) | 16.2 (61.2) | 12.6 (54.7) |
Source 1: National Oceanic and Atmospheric Administration
Source 2: Bureau of Meteorology

== Culture ==
Tabulam has a large Indigenous population with a number of Indigenous villages surrounding the local area. The main one being Jubullum Village which is the home to the Tabulum Turtle Divers rugby team. This village is located on the Rocky River and has around 130-150 people. Local cultural leaders and artists live in this village and a team of locals maintains the lawns and houses.

== Recreation ==
Tabulam has a number of recreational activities.

Tabulam Golf Course is located near the Clarence river at Tabulam. It is a 9-hole bush-land course. The course is maintained by volunteers. It is open to the public.

Tabulam has an active CWA Branch who participates in many community events.

Local Markets are held in Tabulam on the 2nd Sunday of each month, with an 'open mike' music, stalls with locally made products and produce. The September Market will be transforming into the Blueberry Festival, which was first held in May 2017 and Oct 2019. During the year 'special' themed markets have jumping castles, puppet shows and more for free for children.

Tabulam hosts an annual Spring Racing Carnival, occurring each year on the Saturday of the October long weekend. The Tabulam racecourse is managed by the Tabulam Jockey Club. The Tabulam Races are held at the local racetrack, located approximately 1 km south of the township, on the bank of the Clarence River. The 5 race carnival culminates with the Tabulam Cup, a 2220m race.

White-water rafting, camping, fishing, bushwalking and other nature activities are available at the town. A local company offers weekend or single day river adventures, with guides and the opportunity to spot a platypus or wedge-tailed eagle.
