= Bundjalung people =

Aboriginal Australian people of northern New South Wales and South-east Queensland

- Aka: Badjalang (Tindale)(Horton); Bandjalang (SIL)
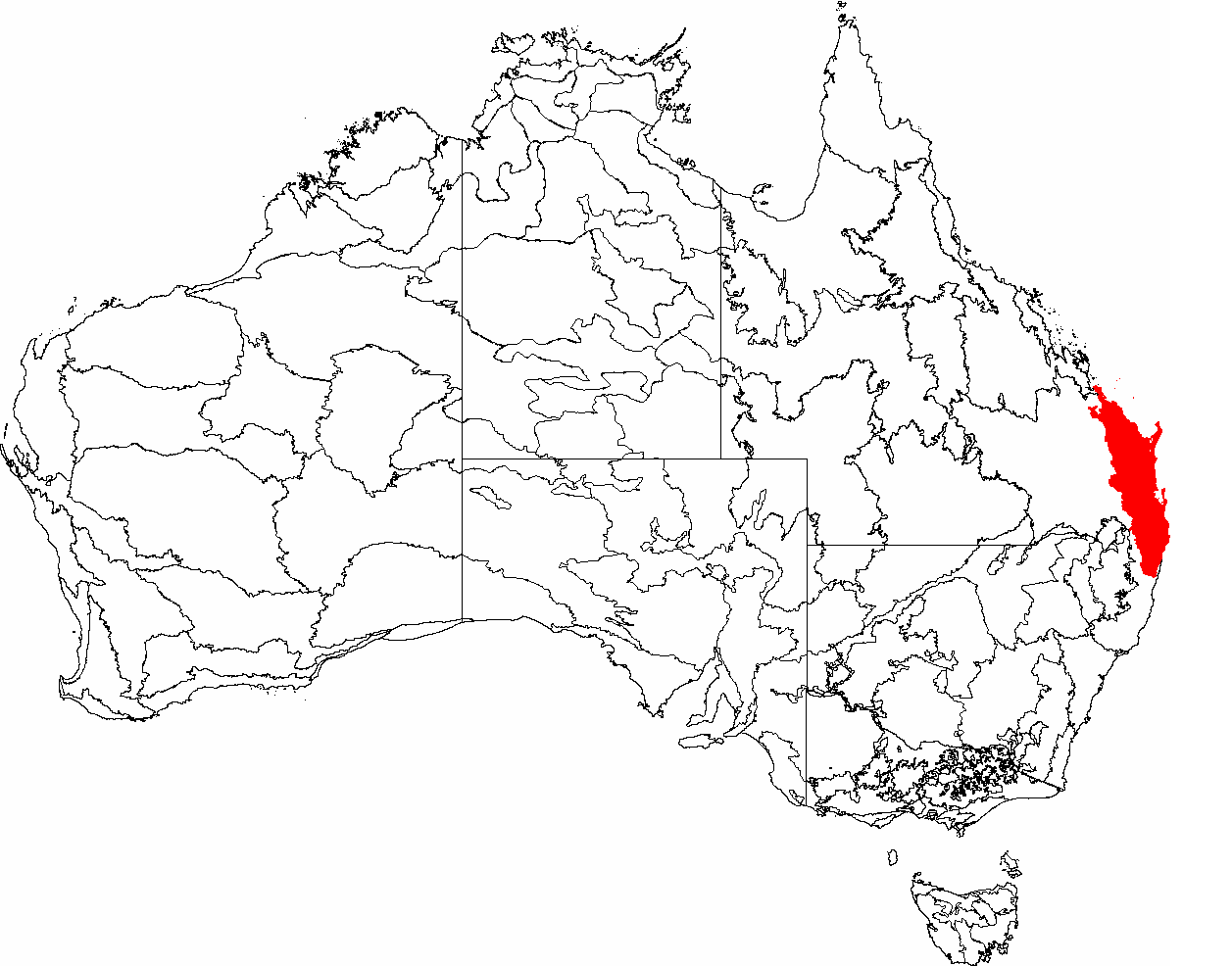
- South Eastern Queensland bioregion

Hierarchy
- Language family: Pama–Nyungan
- Language branch: Bandjalangic
- Language group: Bundjalung
- Group dialects: Arakwal; Baryulgal; Dinggabal; Githabul; Minyungbal; Nganduwal; Njangbal; Waalulbal; Wiyabal(a.k.a. Widje); Wudjeebal.; Yugumbir

Area (approx. 6,000 sq. km)
- Location: North-eastern; New South Wales
- Coordinates: 29°15′S 152°55′E
- Mountains: McPherson Range; Mount Warning (a.k.a. Wollumbin)
- Rivers: Lower reaches of: Clarence River a.k.a. Breimba; Tweed River; Richmond River
- Other geological: Cape Byron
- Urban areas: Ballina; Beaudesert; Casino; Gold Coast; Grafton; Lismore; Tabulam; Tweed Heads; Logan, Queensland; Warwick; Woodenbong

The Bundjalung people, also spelled Bunjalung, Badjalang and Bandjalang, are Aboriginal Australians who are the original custodians of a region from around Grafton in northern coastal New South Wales to Beaudesert in south-east Queensland. The region is located approximately 550 kilometres (340 mi) northeast of Sydney and 100 kilometres (62 mi) south of Brisbane that now includes the Bundjalung National Park.

In the north, the Bundjalung nation shares a border with the Yuggera and Barrunggam nations; to the east is the Tasman Sea (Pacific Ocean); to the south the Gumbaynggirr (also known as the Kumbainggar) nation; and to the west it borders the Ngarabal nation.

The languages of the Bundjalung people are dialects of the Lower-Richmond branch of the Yugambeh-Bundjalung language family.

The names of the 15 tribal groups comprising the Bundjalung nation are Arakwal, Banbai, Birbai, Galiabal, Gidabal, Gumbainggeri, Jigara, Jugambal, Jugumbir (Yugembeh), Jungai, Minjungbal, Ngacu, Ngamba, Nyangbal and Widjabal/Wiyabal.

== History ==
Before European colonisation, the Bundjalung nation encompassed some of the richest hunting and fishing grounds anywhere on the Australian continent. According to the oral traditions of the Bundjalung People, the area was first settled by the Three Brothers and their descendants.

The Bundjalung people inhabit the far-north coast of New South Wales and south-east Queensland. Some Dreamtime stories describe their ancestors arriving in Australia from other lands following a significant environmental event. Additionally, some Indigenous groups in the Perth region hold spiritual beliefs regarding their origins being linked to the stars and the Solar System.

People of the Bundjalung nation have lived on and visited Goanna Headland for at least 12,000 years. The Aboriginal tribes were not united before the 18th century, and comprised more than 20 main groups, known collectively as the "Bundjalung nation". Certain deities and religious practices were specific to certain localities.

Goanna Headland is also significant as the site where the ancestors of the Bundjalung people arrived by sea and populated the surrounding country. This event is related through the legend of "The Three Brothers (Bundjalung nation)".

=== European arrival ===
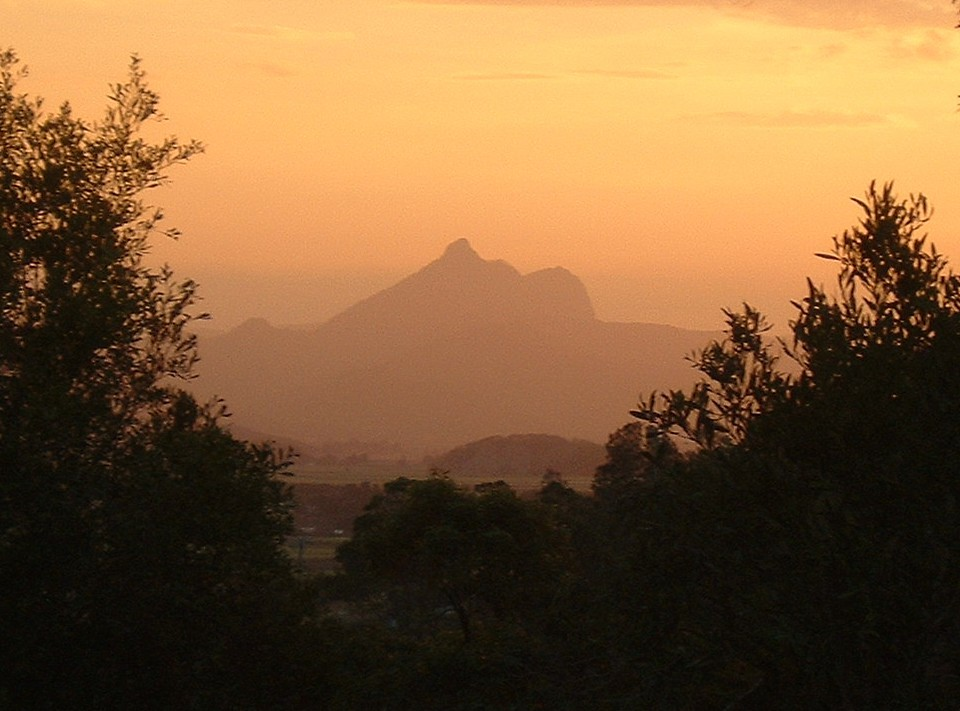
Wollumbin, a range to the north of Mt Warning

On 15 May 1770, the coast in the vicinity of Evans Head was first mapped and described by Lieutenant James Cook on the Royal Navy barque HMS Endeavour, during Cook's first voyage to what became known as New Zealand and Australia. Cook did not land but, the next day, he saw and named Cape Byron and Mount Warning, known to the Bundjalung people as Wollumbin. He named Mount Warning as a result of encountering nearby offshore reefs.

Cook did not see the entrance to the Richmond River, but noted the presence of about 20 Bundjalung people on what is now Seven Mile Beach, just to the south of Broken Head. Sir Joseph Banks also noted the people and remarked that they completely ignored the presence of HMS Endeavour. That might indicate that Endeavour was not the first ship that they had seen (Richmond River Historical Society {RRHS}, 1997).

On 20 August 1828, Captain Henry John Rous, on the frigate HMS Rainbow, dropped anchor at Byron Bay. His mission was to discover a navigable river and safe anchorage site. On 26 August 1828, Rous discovered the entrance to the Richmond River (the longest navigable river on the coast of New South Wales) and explored 32 kilometers (20 mi) upstream, as far as Tuckean Swamp, with two lieutenants in a pinnace. Rous subsequently named the river Richmond after his brother's best friend, Charles Gordon-Lennox, 5th Duke of Richmond.

=== European settlement ===
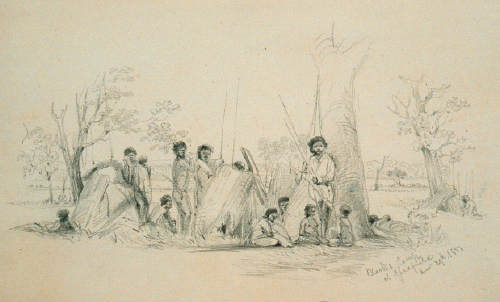
Camp at Gladfield, a pencil drawing by Conrad Martens dated 29 December 1851, held in the Mitchell Library, SLNSW

The beginning of European settlement into the Richmond River area was the result of early explorations of the region by red cedar cutters and farmers, who arrived around 1842, after hearing stories from "stray natives" of the great wudgie-wudgie (red cedar) in the Richmond river area to the north of the Clarence river. Red cedar getters, as obsessed by 'red gold' as those who later suffered 'gold fever', brooked no interference in their quest for the magnificent old trees.

To legally cut red cedar, loggers were required to obtain a cedar cutter's license from Grafton (and later Casino), issued by Commissioner Oliver Fry for the North Creek and Emigrant Creek scrubs in 1851, and costing £6. The license did not provide ownership to land, but did allow the cedar-getter to build a hut and cut cedar on unsettled land. Word rapidly spread about the wonderful red cedar timber which made small fortunes for the men of the Richmond River.

=== Timeline ===
Date	Events
10,000 BC	Goanna Headland at Evans Head, New South Wales, Australia. (2009). Aboriginal ancestors of the people who make up the Bundjalung nation first arrived on the North Coast of NSW thousands of years ago. The minimum time by which this migration had taken place is confirmed at 12,000 years ago, with the upper bound (or earliest period) remaining a matter of some unresolved contention. This Bundjalung historical event, is verbally told by Aborigines, in their culture in the Dreamtime legend of "The Three Brothers (Bundjalung nation)."
4000 BC	Goanna Headland meets the Sea. As the ice caps melted at the end of the Pleistocene Epoch about 12,000 years ago (10,000 BC), sea levels rose and covered a strip of land off the east coast of Australia, leaving high relief terrain exposed as a coastal promontory. The coastal campsites (of the Bundjalung nation Aboriginal's ancestors), that were used before the sea stabilized, around 6,000 years ago (4000 BC), now lie beneath the sea.
1650 AD	The Marriage Tree (Western Kurrajong Tree) given as a gift during an Aboriginal Marriage at Evans Head, New South Wales, Australia. (2010). In Bundjalung National Park at an Aboriginal midden on the banks of the Evans River, is a Western Kurrajong tree that is estimated to be more than 360 years old. The Marriage Tree as it is called by Bundjalung Aboriginals, was a gift from the Wahlubal tribe at Tabulam, when a wedding took place at Gummigurrah between a man and a woman. Gummigurrah was the winter campsite for Bundjalung people. The midden site is close to a camping ground.
May 1770 AD	Victoria Park Nature Reserve is a 17.5-hectare (43-acre) sub tropical jungle remnant of the Big Scrub which once covered most of the district, situated 16 kilometres south-east of Lismore, it features the remnants of a gigantic Moreton Bay fig tree, which was seen by Lieutenant James Cook FRS RN as he sailed up the east coast of Australia on HMS Endeavour. The tree was struck by lightning in the early 1980s, but today people can walk around its base and marvel at its size.
15 May 1770 AD	Endeavour replica crossing the Endeavour River at Cooktown, near where its namesake was beached for seven weeks in 1770 The coast in the vicinity of Evans Head was first mapped and described by Lieutenant James Cook FRS RN of the United Kingdom on HMS Endeavour.
15 May 1770 AD	Lieutenant James Cook FRS RN (1775). Lieutenant James Cook FRS RN noted the presence of about 20 Bundjalung Arakwal people on what is now known as 'Seven Mile Beach', north of Lennox Head and just to the south of Broken Head.
15 May 1770 AD	Caricature of 'Sir Joseph Banks' wearing the Order of the Bath as a result of his expedition to the South Seas. Sir Joseph Banks also noted the same 20 Bundjalung Arakwal people as Lieutenant James Cook FRS RN, and he noted that: '... not one was once observed to stop and look toward the ship; they pursued their way in all appearance entirely unmoved by the neighbourhood of so remarkable an object as a ship must necessarily be to people who have never seen one.' This would seem to indicate that HMS Endeavour was not the first ship that they had seen (Richmond River Historical Society {RRHS}, 1997).
16 May 1770 AD	John Byron, by Joshua Reynolds, 1759 Lieutenant James Cook FRS RN on the Endeavour names Cape Byron, in honour of Vice-Admiral The Hon. John 'Foulweather Jack' Byron RN (8 November 1723 – 10 April 1786), another British navigator, and grandfather of Lord Byron (22 January 1788 – 19 April 1824). Cook also noted a pair of small islands, naming the two main peaks Julian Rocks after his nephew and niece, Juan and Julia. Lieutenant James Cook FRS RN, was the first European to record in his diary of seeing "... a remarkable sharp peaked Mountain lying inland..." from a point of land he named Cape Byron. Five hours later while sailing north, Cook was forced to change course to the east after encountering the dangerous reefs that run 3 miles (4.8 km) to the east from Fingal Head, now named Danger Reefs (comprising Inner, South, and Outer reefs).
17 May 1770 AD	Mount Warning at sunset. Mount Warning (Wulambiny Momoli) was named by Lieutenant James Cook FRS RN as a warning to other seafarers, of the numerous treacherous reefs along the New South Wales north coast, after seeing the mountain from the sea while sailing past. Lieutenant James Cook FRS RN, did not know that the Bundjalung people for many miles around called the mountain 'Wulambiny Momoli', and that it was an important sacred site, as their lives and religion were strongly linked to the land. Lieutenant James Cook FRS RN on the Endeavour recorded in his diary in the morning: "…We now saw the breakers [reefs] again within us which we past at the distance of 1 League, they lay in the Lat de of 38°..8' [later changed to 28°..8'] & stretch off East two Leagues from a point under which is a small Island. There situation may always be found by the peaked mountain before mentioned which bears SWBW from them this and on this account I have named Mount Warning it lies 7 or 8 Leagues inland in the latitude of 28°..22" S° the land is high and hilly about it but it is conspicuous enough to be distinguished from everything else. The point off which these shoals lay I have named Point Danger to the northward of it the land which is low trends NWBN but we soon found that it did not keep that direction long before it turned again to the northward."
20 August 1828 AD	Portrait of 'Henry John Rous' with George Payne, by G. Thompson Captain Henry John Rous, also known as Admiral Henry John Rous (23 January 1795 – 19 June 1877), on the frigate HMS Rainbow dropped anchor at Byron Bay. His mission was to discover a navigable river and safe anchorage site. Rous identified the mouth of the Richmond river as he sailed along the coast from Sydney Town to Moreton Bay.
26 August 1828 AD	His Grace The Duke of Richmond KG, PC Captain Henry John Rous on the frigate HMS Rainbow discovers the entrance to the Richmond River (the longest navigable river on the coast of NSW) and explores 32 kilometres up the river with two lieutenants in a Pinnace, as far as Tuckean Swamp. Captain Henry John Rous subsequently named the river Richmond after his brother's best friend, Charles Gordon-Lennox, 5th Duke of Richmond.
1839 AD	Queen Victoria (Alexandrina Victoria; 24 May 1819 – 22 January 1901) was the Queen of the United Kingdom of Great Britain and Ireland from 20 June 1837, and the first Empress of India of the British Raj. Queen Victoria's Ordinance on the rights of Aborigines as subjects; 2 Vic. 27 1839; "where there is a violent death in consequence of a collision with white men, an Inquest or Inquiry is to be held in the same way as if the Deceased had been of European origin".
1839 AD	Originally, Tabulam and the surrounding farm and bushland was inhabited by Bundjalung people. The land was first settled by Europeans in 1839.
1840 AD	Walker Street shopping precinct in Casino. Squatters Henry Clay and George Stapleton cut a path through the bush from Glen Innes down to Tabulam, there they purchased cattle and drove their cattle herds over the Richmond Range and settled on the Richmond River. To their 30,720-acre (124.3 km^{2}) grazing run they claimed, they gave the name "Cassino" (Now known as the town of Casino) which was named after the beautiful town of Monte Cassino in Italy. Prior to European settlement the Casino district was part of the lands inhabited by the Bundjalung Aborigines. It is unclear how many of the group lived around Casino although one report, dating from 1840, talks about a gathering of a 'mob of wild blacks numbering five hundred or upwards'. The Bundjalung spread across the area and their territory reached as far north as Toowoomba and included the modern-day towns of Tenterfield and Warwick. One of the annual rituals of the Bundjalung people was the movement to the coast during the winter months when the mullet were plentiful. The inland peoples from around Casino brought black bean seeds with them to trade for the fish. The seeds are poisonous, but become edible when carefully prepared by pounding into flour, leaching with water, and roasting. The timber, which somewhat resembles walnut, is moderately hard, takes a good polish, and is highly durable. The black bean or Moreton Bay chestnut (Castanospermum australe) has proved valuable to Europeans as a timber species, its seeds have been utilised – following extensive preparation as a food by Aborigines and it contains alkaloids which have been shown to have anti-HIV and anti-cancer properties.
1841 AD	On 11 August 1841 Oliver Fry was appointed the first commissioner of Crown Lands for the Clarence Squatting District, incorporating the Clarence, Richmond and Tweed Valleys. It was his decision not to officially record Aboriginal culture of the region. Fry was instructed to 'gain confidence and goodwill' of the Bundjalung people in the 'pursuit of civilised life', and he was involved in at least one known massacre of Dangaddi or Gumbainggari aboriginal people in 1845, in the Boyd River Region of Oxley Wild Rivers National Park, along the Old Glen Innes to Grafton Highway in North East NSW. It is said that the Clarence River Aboriginals in their primitive state were remarkably moral, and most rigid in the observance of their marriage and other laws.
1842 AD	The beginning of European settlement into the Richmond River area by red cedar cutters (lumbermen) and farmers (pastoralists). Tea Tree Oil (Melaleuca Oil) This initial establishment of European settlement and associated industries in this harsh environment was foreign to early European settlers. High rainfall and humid conditions, injuries and insect attack was a major health hazard causing serious infection that may result in death. Supplies of mild European antiseptics were scarce and had limited effect on serious infections and fungal diseases. The Bundjalung people of eastern Australia exposed to the same harsh conditions with little or no protection were observed crushing tea tree leaf and binding it over wounds and infections with paper bark strapping. The results were staggering, infection was controlled and wounds healed rapidly. Botanists soon identified this unique medicinal tree and created the botanical species Melaleuca alternifolia. In addition, the Bundjalung people used "tea trees" as a traditional medicine by inhaling the oils from the crushed leaves to treat coughs and colds. Furthermore, tea tree leaves are soaked to make an infusion to treat sore throats or skin ailments. Historically ‘Bungawalbyn Valley Basin' is the birthplace of the 'TEA TREE INDUSTRY' and over a period of time world populations were introduced to this unique 'natural' antiseptic. Still to this day, modern science has failed to provide a safe effective medication for the treatment of topical infections and fungal diseases compared to ‘Australian Native Tea Tree Oil'.
1842 AD	Pelican Creek massacre: In 1842, five European men were killed at Pelican Creek which is a few kilometres north of Coraki, which led to 100 Bundjalung people being massacred by way of reprisal at Evans Head.
1842 AD	The Evans Head Massacre which led to the deaths of approximately 100 Bundjalung people by Europeans at Evans Head, was said by Aboriginals to have been in retaliation for the killing of 'a few sheep', or was said by Europeans to have been for the killing of 'five European men' from the 1842 'Pelican Creek Tragedy'.
1843 AD	Surveyor James Burnett named the new settlement at the mouth of the Richmond River 'Deptford' (Now known as the town of Ballina).
1843 AD	The Rainbow Train in Heritage Park in Lismore. European history of Lismore begins in c.1843. The original sheep run in what is now the Lismore area was located on the north arm of the Richmond River, and the station covered 23,000 acres (93 km^{2}), taken up by Captain Dumaresq around 1843. The sheep which were herded down from New England found the wetter sub-tropical climate not to their liking, and the losses caused by fluke, foot rot and other diseases led to the abandonment of the run. In January 1845, William and Jane Wilson took over the run, and named it Lismore, after a small island in a loch in the Scottish Highlands. They built a house at the far northern corner of the run within twelve months of arrival, and a second house by 1851 near the corner of the present Ballina and Molesworth Streets, which was known as Lismore House. Unfortunately, neither house survives. The Wilsons, however, were commemorated in 1976 by the renaming of the north arm of the Richmond River as Wilson River.
1849 AD	Welcome sign on the outskirts of Coraki. The village of Coraki was founded by William Yabsley.
1853/4 AD	East Ballina massacre: The Native Mounted Police were formed in 1848 in New South Wales. The Mounted Police members were from subdued Aboriginal tribes and were under the command of European Officers. The Native Mounted Police enforced European law on Aboriginal tribes with which they had no bonds. In 1853–4, at an area close to the present day East Ballina Golf Course, the Native Police slaughtered at least 30 – 40 Bundjalung Nyangbal people while they slept. It was believed by Native Mounted Police that some Aborigines from north of the Tweed River had murdered some Europeans and that the murderers had fled south towards the Richmond River. On the night prior to the raid, the Mounted Police stayed at James Ainsworth's father's Public House, 'The Sailor's Home'. That is, the European troopers stayed in the hotel while the native Aboriginal trackers stayed outside the hotel. The Native Mounted Police patrol neither disclosed the purpose of their mission nor made any inquiries about the incident. At 3 am the next morning the Native Mounted Police patrol rode out to where between 200 and 300 Bundjalung Nyangbal people lay asleep in camp. The Nyangbal East Ballina clan had a camping ground on the slope of the hill facing the valley near Black Head. The troopers and trackers surrounded the Bundjalung Nyangbal camp and opened fire at close range. Aboriginal men, women and children of the Bundjalung Nyangbal East Ballina clan were slaughtered. After the carnage, the Native Mounted Police patrol then headed north towards the Tweed River. The European settlers of East Ballina were disturbed by the unprovoked attack on the friendly natives. They reported the massacre to the NSW Government and urged it to take action. The NSW Government took no action against the perpetrators and told the Europeans settlers 'to mind their own business and warned that persistence in the matter might lead to trouble for them', hence there are no official records of the massacres. When the Aboriginal survivors eventually returned to the camp, they sought no reprisals and took no revenge against the Native Mounted Police involved in the massacre. There is also strong oral tradition amongst the Bundjalung Aboriginal community that a massacre occurred in the 1850s at an old campsite at East Ballina. The oral tradition includes stories of escape, of people who were shot and were laid to rest in the forests north of the camp, and of those who were driven off the cliff at Black Head. There is a belief that some victims of the massacre were never buried, their bodies being either dumped off the cliff at Black Head or abandoned on Angels Beach.
1860s AD	South Ballina poisoning: The South Ballina clan of the Nyangbal people were a tribe, sub-group or estate group of the Bundjalung nation, numbering about 200 people during the early development of Ballina township. During the early 1860s a mass poison attempt was made. Poisoned flour was given to the Bundjalung Nyangbal people to make damper. The Nyangbal Aboriginal people took it to their camp at South Ballina for preparation & cooking. The old people and children of the Nyangbal tribe refused to eat the damper as it was a new food. Upon waking the next morning, survivors of the Nyangbal tribe found nearly 150 adults dead.
1882 AD	New Italy Settlement: Perhaps the most interesting of all the developments around the town of Rocky Mouth (now called Woodburn by European Settlers and was known by Bundjalung Aboriginals as 'Maniworkan') occurred in 1882 when a number of Italians settled near Woodburn. 'In 1880, the ill-fated Marquis de Rays expedition of 340 hopeful migrants from Veneto, Italy, sailed to make a new home in New Ireland (now part of Papua New Guinea). 'Here they struggled against fever, starvation and the jungle, and many died. After four months the survivors made their way to Nouméa and sought aid from the Government of New South Wales. The Premier, Sir Henry Parkes, arranged their safe transport. They reached Sydney on 7 April 1881. A number of them came to this place and built a happy and prosperous settlement, which was called "New Italy". Nothing now remains of their homes. But the quiet pride, the courage and strength of these Italian pioneers will always be remembered in the Woodburn district with respect and gratitude.'
1877 AD	Discovery of gold at Evans Head.
1928 AD	The Southern Cross at a RAAF base near Canberra in 1943. Sir Charles Edward Kingsford Smith in his plane, the "Southern Cross", was the first person in an aircraft to cross the Pacific from Oakland California to Brisbane QLD, via Honolulu, Suva and Ballina. Charles Kingsford Smith and Charles Ulm covered the 7,200 miles (11,600 km) in 83 hours 50 minutes flying time from 31 May – 9 Jun 1928.
1954 AD	Her Australian Majesty Queen Elizabeth II (2007). Her Australian Majesty Queen Elizabeth II visited Evans Head during her Royal visit to Australia.
1968 AD	Before 1968 it was illegal to pay an indigenous worker more than a specified amount in goods or money. They were not allowed to own land and any currency or money they earned was administered on their behalf by whites. In many cases, the government benefits for which Indigenous employees were eligible were paid into pastoral companies' accounts, rather than to the individuals. Aboriginals were stopped from raising their own children, from freedom of movement, having access to education, receiving award wages, marrying without permission, eating in restaurants, entering a pub, swimming in a public pool or having the right to vote.
1976 AD	The Aboriginal culture in the Bundjalung nation is evident in many aspects, including many bora rings. Casino was an important aboriginal meeting place. A bora ring more than twice the diameter of the average ring was found just north of the town. However, the site was illegally destroyed by Pedrini for landfill at the Casino Hospital site in 1976.
1983 AD	The NSW Aboriginal Land Rights Act 1983 was another important milestone. The dispossession of Aboriginal people from their land is acknowledged in the Act's preamble, which states; 1. Land in the State of New South Wales was traditionally owned and occupied by Aborigines.; 2. Land is of spiritual, social, cultural and economic importance to Aborigines; 3. It is fitting to acknowledge the importance which land has for Aborigines and the need for Aborigines of land.; 4. It is accepted that as a result of past government decisions the amount of land set aside for Aborigines has been progressively reduced without compensation.
1985 AD	Mouth of the Evans River at Evans Head, New South Wales, Australia. (2005). A 16-hectare (40-acre) section of the southern part of Goanna Headland at Evans Head became the first aboriginal land grant in New South Wales.

== Language ==
Bundjalung is a Pama-Nyungan language. It has two unusual features: certain syllables are strongly stressed while others are "slurred", and it classifies gender into four classes: (a) masculine (b) feminine (c) arboreal and (d) neuter.

== Country ==
Norman Tindale estimated the Bundjalung People lived over an area approximately 2,300 square miles (6,000 km^{2}), from north of the Clarence River to the Richmond River including the site of Ballina and inland to Tabulam and Baryugil. The coastal Widje clan ventured no further than Rappville. The area underwent significant change with sea level rise 18,000 to 7,500 years ago which completely displaced inhabitants of previous coastal areas and resulted in dramatic changes in distributions of peoples.

== Alternative names ==
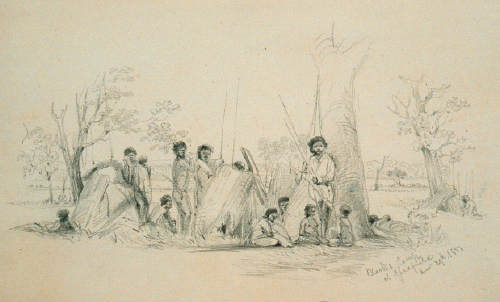
Camp at Gladfield, A Pencil drawing by Martens, Conrad (1801–78) dated Dec. 29th 1851 - 19.1 x 31.1cm held in the Mitchell Library, State Library of New South Wales

According to Norman Tindale, various spellings and other names were used for the Bundjalung people:

- Badjelang (paidjal/badjal means "man")
- Bandjalang, Bandjalong
- Budulung
- Buggul
- Bundela, Bundel
- Bunjellung
- Paikalyung, Paikalyug
- Watchee
- Widje (clan or clans at Evans Head)
- Woomargou

== Culture ==
=== Initiation ceremony ===
According to R. H. Mathews, the Bundjalung rite of transition into manhood began with a cleared space called a walloonggurra some distance from the main camp. On the evening the novices are taken from their mothers around dusk, the men sing their way to this bora ground where a small bullroarer (dhalguñgwn) is whirled.

=== Musical instruments ===
The Bundjalung used a variety of instruments, including blowing on a eucalyptus leaf, creating a bird-like sound. Clapsticks were used to establish a drumbeat rhythm on ceremonial dancing occasions. Emu callers (short didgeridoos about 30 centimetres (12 in) long) were traditionally used by the Bundjalung when hunting (Eastern Australia Coastal Emus). When striking the emu-caller at one end with the open palm it sounds like an emu. This decoy attracts the bird out of the bush making it an easy prey.

== Native title ==
In late April 2021, the Federal Court of Australia convened at Evans Head, where a native title determination was made over 7.2 square kilometres (2.8 sq mi) of land, consisting of 52 separate areas of land. The application had been launched in 1996, and the first determination made in 2013. Included in the land is a bora ring of great cultural significance near Coraki.

== Notable people ==
- Evelyn Araluen, poet
- Bob Bellear, judge of the District Court of New South Wales, the first Indigenous person to be appointed to any court in Australia
- Troy Cassar-Daley, country singer, winner of ARIA and Deadly awards, among others
- Melissa Lucashenko, author, winner of 2013 Walkley Award for non-fiction and 2019 Miles Franklin Award
- Madeleine and Miah Madden, actresses, half-sisters with Bundjalung heritage through their father
- Lambert McBride, activist for Aboriginal citizenship rights during the 1960s
- Digby Moran, artist
- Anthony Mundine, former boxer, rugby league star
- Djon Mundine, artist
- Warren Mundine, businessman, former politician
- Mark Olive, Aboriginal Australian chef
- Nikita Ridgeway, tattoo artist and graphic designer
- Rhoda Roberts, journalist, arts advisor and artistic director; Wiyabal clan
- Budjerah Julum Slabb, singer-songwriter
- Clive Andrew Williams, aboriginal cultural activist

== See also ==
- Dirawong

== Sources ==
- "About". Troy Cassar-Daley.
- "ATNS - Agreements, Treaties and Negotiated Settlements project". Agreements, Treaties and Negotiated Settlements (ATNS) project.
- Bundock, M. (1889). "Note on the aborigines of Casino, N.S.W". Archiv für Ethnologie. 2: 52–53 – via Internet Archive.
- "Bunjalung of Byron Bay (Arakwal) Indigenous Land Use Agreement". Agreements, Treaties and Negotiated Settlements (ATNS) project. 28 August 2001. Archived from the original on 29 February 2020.
- Farrow-Smith, Eloise (14 January 2020). "Digby Moran, internationally acclaimed First Nations artist, dies". ABC News.
- "Githabul People's native title determination: North-eastern New South Wales" (PDF). National Native Title Tribunal. 29 November 2007. Archived from the original (PDF) on 1 June 2011.
- Hoff, Jennifer (2006). Bunjalung Jugun [Bunjalung Country]. Richmond River Historical Society. ISBN 1-875474-24-2. citing Yamba Yesterday, Howland and Lee, Yamba Centenary Committee.
- Langford Ginibi, Ruby (15 November 1995). "Australian Biography: Ruby Langford Ginibi" (Interview). Interviewed by Robin Hughes. National Film and Sound Archive.
- Mathews, R. H. (1897a). "Totemic divisions of the Australian tribes". Proceedings of Royal Society of New South Wales. 31: 154–176 – via BHL.
- Mathews, R. H. (1897b). "Wandarral of the Richmond and Clarence River tribes". Proceedings of the Royal Society of Victoria. 10: 29–42 – via BHL.
- Mathews, R. H. (1898). "Initiation ceremonies of Australian tribes. Appendix Nguttan initiation ceremony". Proceedings of the American Philosophical Society. 37: 54–73 – via BHL.
- Mathews, R. H. (1900). "Walloonggurra ceremony" (PDF). Queensland Geographical Journal. 15: 67–74 – via Internet Archive.
- Ross, Hannah (30 April 2021). "NSW Bandjalang people victorious after 25-year native title fight". ABC News.
- Sharpe, Margaret C. (1985). "Bundjalung Settlement and Migration" (PDF). Aboriginal History. 9 (1): 101–124.
- Sharpe, Margaret C. (1993). "Bunjalung: Teaching a Disappearing Language". In Walsh, Michael; Yallop, Colin (eds.). Language and Culture in Aboriginal Australia. Aboriginal Studies Press. ISBN 978-0-855-75241-5.
- Sharpe, Margaret C. (1994). An all-dialect dictionary of Banjalang, an Australian language no longer in general use. Linguistic Society of the Philippines Special Monograph Issue. pp. 35–48.
- Steele, John Gladstone (1984). Aboriginal Pathways: in Southeast Queensland and the Richmond River. University of Queensland Press. ISBN 978-0-702-25742-1.
- Threlkeld, Lancelot; Fraser, John (1892). An Australian language as spoken by the Awabakal (PDF). Sydney: Government printer.
- Tindale, Norman Barnett (1974). Aboriginal Tribes of Australia: Their Terrain, Environmental Controls, Distribution, Limits, and Proper Names. Australian National University Press. ISBN 978-0-708-10741-6.
- "Troy Cassar-Daley". Talking Heads. Australian Broadcasting Corporation. 4 May 2009. Archived from the original on 18 October 2010.
