= Waalubal dialect =

Australian Aboriginal language

Waalubal
- Baryulgil
- Wahlubal
- Native to: Australia
- Region: New South Wales
- Ethnicity: Wahlubal (Western Bundjalung)
- Language family: Pama-Nyungan: Southeastern; North Coast; Bandjalangic; Waalubal
- Dialects: Wahlubal; Birihn; Baryulgil (Wehlubal / Wirribi); Casino

Language codes
- ISO 639-3: –
- Glottolog: midd1357
- AIATSIS: E16.2 Waalubal, E72 Birihn, E73 Casino language, E80 Wehlubal

Waalubal (Wahlubal), also known as Western Bundjalung, Baryulgil, and Middle Clarence Bandjalang, is an Australian Aboriginal language spoken by the Western Bundjalung living in North-East New South Wales.

== Nomenclature ==
In the Waalubal language, Wahlubal means "those who say Wahlu", Wahlu being the form of the second person nominative 'you' used in this variety. Wahlubal was spoken in the Tabulam area, further downstream at Baryulgil the Wehlubal dialect was spoken, Wehlu being this dialects form of Wahlu.

To the east across the range, at Rappville along Bungawalbin creek the Birihn dialect was spoken, Birihn meaning 'southern', slightly the north was the very similar but distinct Casino dialect, known only as Bundjalung.

These are all common exonyms and endonyms for the people and their languages. The generic term Bundjalung or Western bundjalung is also commonly used.

== Geographic distribution ==
Wahlubal is spoken along the Clarence river upstream from the Yagir language.

== Grammar ==
=== Demonstratives ===
Western Bundjalung possesses a complicated set of demonstratives that make a three-way distinction, with proximal, medial, and distal sets, there is a further distinguishing of demonstrative adjectives and location demonstratives. The adjective set can be additionally suffixed to create demonstrative pronouns, the adjective set has three forms for "things in sight", "things hidden or not in sight" and "things not there anymore", while the location set has forms to indicate the general area and definite area, and whether in sight or not in sight.

==== Adjective set ====
Demonstrative Adjectives
Demonstratives	Proximal (this)	Medial (that)	Distal (that over there)
In sight (sg)*	Gala	Mala	Gila
In sight (plrl)	Gahnyu	Mahnyu	Gahmu
Not in sight (sg)	Gunah	Munah	Gahba
Not in sight (plrl)	Gunahmir	Munahmir	Gahbamir

The above set can be suffixed with order 7 noun suffixes to form demonstrative pronouns that function like ordinary independent nouns. e.g. Yanindeh galani wangahbaya! 'Take this with you!

The 'not in sight' and 'not here anymore' forms can take the order 2 noun suffix -gan to form time words. E.g. gunahgan 'recently'.

==== Location set ====
Demonstratives	Proximal (here)	Medial (there)	Distal (over there)
In sight (definite area)	Gaji	Maji	Gah
In sight (general area)	Gunu	Munu	Gundeh
Not in sight (present)	Gayu	Mayu	Guhyu
