= Yugambeh–Bundjalung languages =

Language branch spoken in Australia

Yugambeh–Bandjalangic
- Geographic distribution: Queensland and New South Wales, Australia
- Ethnicity: Bundjalung people (Minyungbal, Widjabal), Western Bundjalung people, Githabul, Yugambeh people
- Native speakers: 670 (2021 census)
- Linguistic classification: Pama–Nyungan: Southeastern; North Coast; Yugambeh–Bandjalangic
- Subdivisions: Wahlubal; Yugambeh; Bundjalung proper (Lower Richmond); Githabul

Language codes
- ISO 639-3: bdy
- Glottolog: band1339
- ELP: Bandjalang
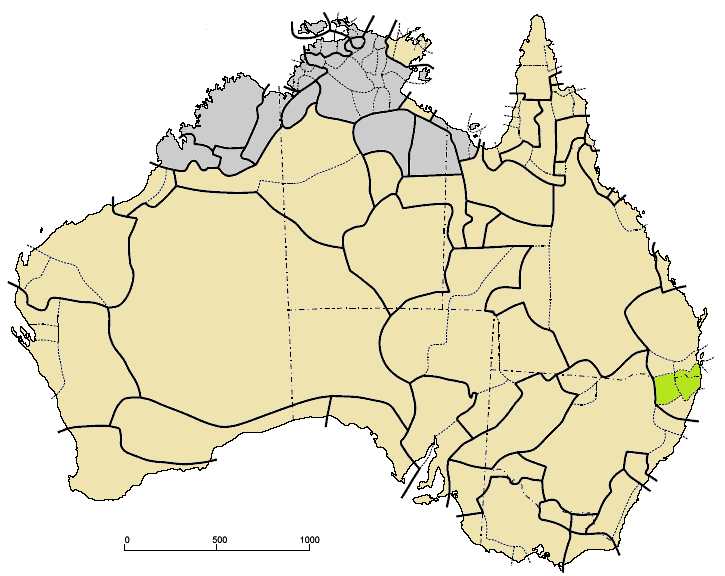
- Bandjalangic languages (green) among other Pama–Nyungan (tan)

- Bundjalung is classified as Severely Endangered by the UNESCO Atlas of the World's Languages in Danger.

Yugambeh–Bundjalung, also known as Bandjalangic, is a branch of the Pama–Nyungan language family that is spoken in north-eastern New South Wales and South-East Queensland.

Yugambeh–Bundjalung was historically a dialect continuum consisting of a number of varieties including Yugambeh, Nganduwal, Minjangbal, Njangbal (Nyangbal), Biriin, Baryulgil, Waalubal, Dinggabal, Wiyabal, Gidabal, Galibal, and Wudjeebal. Language varieties in the group vary in degree of mutual intelligibility, with varieties at different ends of the continuum being mostly unintelligible. These dialects formed four clusters:

- Tweed-Albert language (Yugambeh)
- Condamine-Upper Clarence (Githabul)
- Lower Richmond (Eastern Bundjalung – Nyangbal, Minyangbal and Bandjalang proper)
- Middle Clarence (Western Bundjalung)

Bowern (2011) lists Yugambeh, Githabul, Minyangbal, and Bandjalang as separate Bandjalangic languages. All Yugambeh–Bundjalung languages are nearly extinct. As of 2016, Bandjalang proper had the greatest number of speakers, with 113, while the other dialects had a total of 26 speakers.

Gowar (Guwar) and Pimpama may be more closely related to the Bandjalangic languages rather than to Durubalic.

== Nomenclature ==
The Yugambeh–Bundjalung language chain is spoken by numerous social/cultural groups, some of whom have historically preferred to identify with their particular dialect name, e.g. Githabul or Yugambeh, especially as some groups do not see particular varieties as being 'the same language'.

W. E. Smythe, a doctor in Casino, knew the Bundjalung quite well, noting in his time that the language was spoken widely. He compiled a grammar of the Casino dialect in the 1940s, mistakenly believing he was writing a grammar for the whole language group. When speaking of the name of the language he noted:

'For the linguistic group as a whole I have used the term 'Bandjalang', with which some may disagree. Among the people themselves there is a good deal of confusion. Some say the tribal name should be 'Beigal[Baygal]' (man, people), others that there never was any collective name, while others again state that 'Bandjalang', besides being the specific name of one of the local groups, was also in use as a covering term for all. For convenience I am doing the same.'

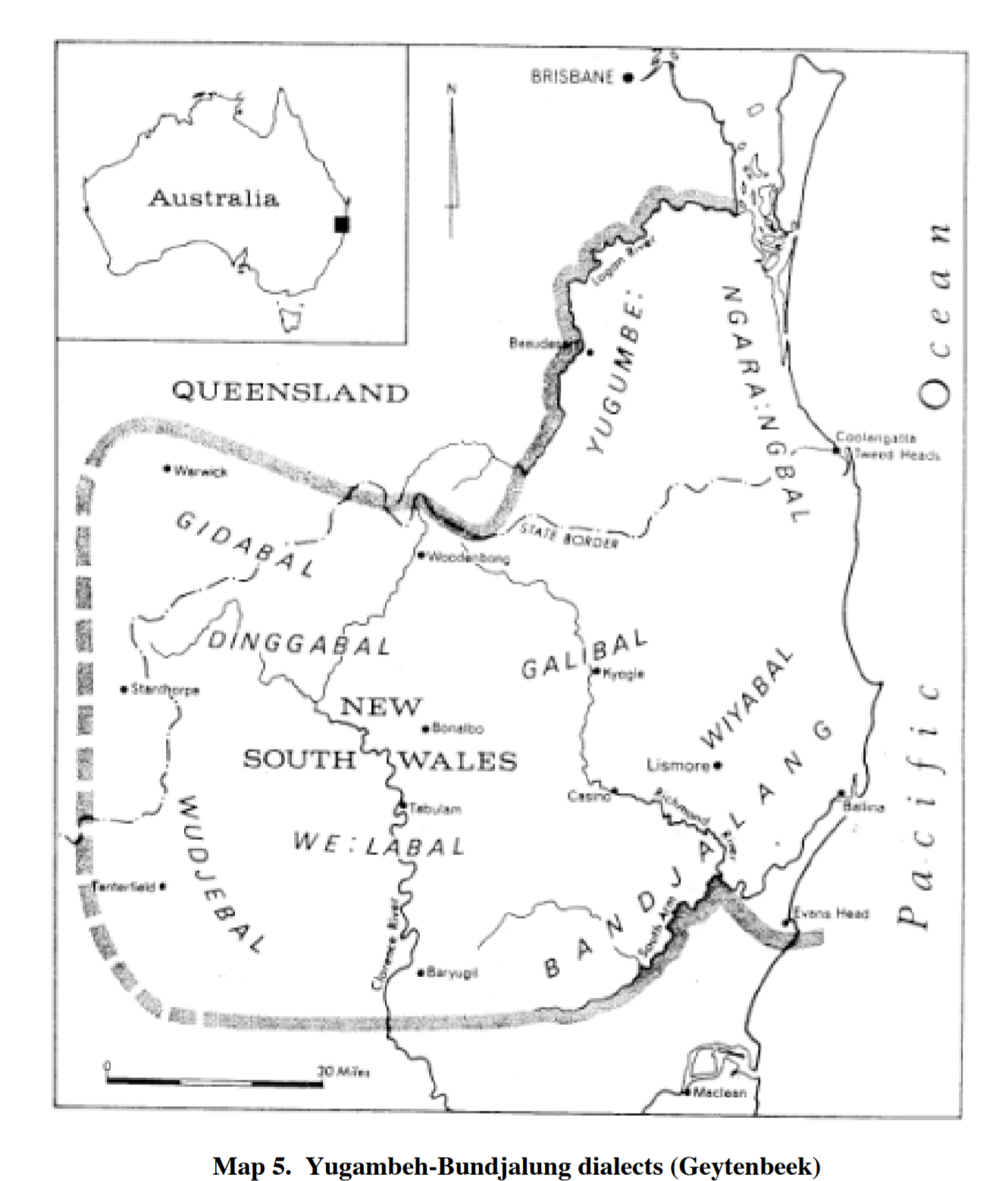
Dialects as described by the Githabul at Woodenbong (Geyteenbeek)

Adding to the confusion is the use of multiple names by different groups, i.e. what one group calls another may not be what it calls itself, or the name of a dialect may change, e.g. Terry Crowley was originally told Wehlubal for the Baryulgil dialect, while a later researcher was given Wirribi.

The earliest sources of anthropological work, which date from the mid to late 1800s, do not give a name for the entire language chain; however, it is clear from sources that particular writers were aware of it, in most instances referring to it by their local variety name or with a descriptor like 'this language with slight variation'. It was not until the early 1900s, with the advent of Aboriginal Protection Boards, that non-Indigenous sources begin overtly naming wider language groups; this naming, however, was instead of local dialect and clan names, which were subsumed under the board's chosen name. Yugambeh–Bundjalung's position at the Queensland–NSW border led to two standard terms: Yugambeh/Yugumbir on the Queensland side and Bundjalung/Bandjalang on the NSW side. It was for this reason that Margaret Sharpe named the chain Yugambeh–Bundjalung, the terms being the most northerly and southerly respectively as well.

Modern Yugambeh–Bundjalung-speaking peoples are often aware of and use the overarching terms Yugambeh and Bundjalung, some groups in conjunction with their own name e.g. Byron Bay Bundjalung– Arakwal. As these words also refer to individual dialects some groups object to their usage, Crowley and Sharpe both agree that Yugambeh referred to the Beaudesert dialect, also known by the clan name Mununjali, and Bundjalung originally referred to the Bungawalbin Creek/Coraki dialect, though the Tabulam people claim they are the original Bundjalung, and use Bandjalang in opposition.

== Geographic distribution ==
Yugambeh–Bandjalang is spoken over a wide geographic area, from the Pacific Ocean to the east and the Logan River catchment as the northern boundary, the Clarence River forming the south and south-western boundaries, and the Northern Tablelands marking the western boundary.

Many of the dialects and branches are confined by natural features such as river basins, mountain ranges, and dense bushland.

== Dialects ==
Yugambeh–Bundjalung or just Bundjalung is used as a cover term for the dialect chain as well as to refer to certain individual dialects. At the time of the first European settlement in the mid-1800s, the Yugambeh–Bundjalung peoples on the north coast of New South Wales and southeast of Queensland spoke up to twenty related dialects. Today only about nine remain. All were mutually intelligible with neighbouring dialects. The dialects form recognisable clusters that share phonological and morphological features, as well as having higher degrees of mutual intelligibility.

=== Clusters ===
Language cluster	Area spoken	Dialects
Condamine-Upper Clarence	Between the Upper Condamine and Upper Clarence River catchments	Galibal, Warwick Dialect, Gidabal, Dinggabal
Lower Richmond	Between the Lower Richmond and Lower Clarence River Catchments	Nyangbal, Bandjalang, Wiyabal, Minyangbal
Middle Clarence	Middle Clarence catchment	Wahlubal, Casino Dialect, Birihn, Baryugil
Tweed-Albert	Between the Logan and Tweed River catchments.	Yugambeh, Ngarangwal, Nganduwal

==== Dialects ====
===== Condamine – Upper Clarence =====
#	Co-ordinates	Dialect	Areas spoken	Alternate names
1.		Kalibal	Kyogle area	Dinggabal, Galibal, Gullybul
2.		Dinggabal	Tabulam area	Dingabal, Dingga, Gidabal
3.		Gidabal	Woodenbong and Tenterfield area	Githabul
4.		Geynan	Warwick area	Warwick dialect

===== Middle Clarence =====
#	Co-ordinates	Dialect	Area spoken	Alternate names
1.		Wahlubal	South of Tabulam to Drake	Bandjalang, Western Bandjalang
2.		Wudjehbal/ Djanangmum	Casino area	Bandjalang
3.		Birihn	Rappville area	Bandjalang
4.		Baryulgil	Baryulgil area	Bandjalang

===== Lower Richmond =====
#	Co-ordinates	Dialect	Area spoken	Alternate names
1.		Nyangbal	Ballina area	Bandjalang
2.		Bandjalang Proper	Bungwalbin Creek and Casino area	Bandjalang
3.		Wiyabal	Lismore area	Wudjehbal, Bandjalang
4.		Minyangbal	Byron Bay area	Bandjalang, Arakwal

===== Tweed–Albert =====
#	Co-ordinates	Dialect	Area spoken	Alternate names
1.		Yugambeh	Logan and Albert River basins	Yugam, Yugambah, Minyangbal
2.		Ngarangwal	Coomera and Nerang River basins	Nerang, Nerangbal, Yugambeh, Yugam, Minyangbal
3.		Nganduwal	Tweed River basins	Yugambeh, Yugam, Ngandu, Minyangbal

== Dialectal differences ==
Until the 1970s all language and linguistic work to date had been undertaken on individual varieties, with major work on grammar undertaken on Githabul, Minyangbal, Yugambeh, and the Casino dialect. Terry Crowley was the first to publish a study of the wider Bandjalangic language group, titled "The middle Clarence dialects of Bandjalang"; it included previously unpublished research on the Casino dialect as an appendix. Crowley analysed not only the vocabulary but also the grammar of the varieties, including comparative cognate figures and examples from various dialects.

== Phonology ==
=== Vowel ===
Varieties of Yugambeh-Bundjalung may have a vowel system of either three or four vowels that also contrast in length, resulting in either six or eight phonemic vowels in total.

In practical orthography and some descriptions of the language, the letter ⟨h⟩ is often used after the vowel to indicate a long vowel.

	Front	Back
High	i iː	u uː
Mid	(e eː)	u uː
Low	a aː	

Vowel alternations

/a/ and /e/ are neutralised as [ɛ] before /j/.

The low central vowel /a/ can be fronted and raised following a palatal consonant, and backed following a velar consonant.

Unstressed short vowels can be reduced to the neutral central vowel schwa [ə] in a similar way to English.

=== Consonants ===
Yugambeh–Bundjalung has a smaller inventory of consonant phonemes than is typical of most Australian languages, having only four contrastive places of articulation and only one lateral and one rhotic phoneme.

	Peripheral		Laminal	Apical
	Bilabial	Velar	Palatal	Alveolar
Nasal	m ⟨m⟩	ŋ ⟨g⟩	ɲ ⟨ň⟩	n ⟨n⟩
Obstruent	b ⟨p⟩	ɡ ⟨k⟩	ɟ ⟨ť⟩	d ⟨t⟩
Lateral				l ⟨l⟩
Rhotic				ɾ ⟨r⟩
Semivowel	w ⟨w⟩		j ⟨j⟩	

Obstruents

Although the standard IPA symbols used in transcription of the language are the voiced stop symbols, these segments are better characterised as obstruents because they are realised more often as fricatives or affricates than actual stops. There is no contrast in Yugambeh-Bundjalung between these manners of articulation.

Yugambeh–Bundjalung varieties do not have voicing contrasts for their obstruent sequences, and so phonological literature varies in its representation of these consonants- some linguists have chosen the symbols /p/, /k/, /c/, /t/, and others have decided upon /b/, /g/, /ɟ/, /d/. Generally, these consonants are phonetically voiceless, except when following a homorganic nasal segment.

Nasals

When nasal stops occur syllable-finally, they are often produced with a stop onset as a free variant.

Lateral

The lateral phoneme can appear as a flap rather than an approximant, and sometimes occurs prestopped as a free variant in the same way as nasals.

Rhotic

The rhotic phoneme has several surface realisations in Yugambeh–Bundjalung. Between vowels, it tends to be a flap, although it can sometimes be an approximant, and it is usually a trill at the end of syllables.

Semi-vowels

The existence of semi-vowels in Yugambeh–Bundjalung can be disputed, as in many Australian languages. Some linguists posit their existence in order to avoid an analysis that involves onset-less syllables. Some phonologists have found that semi-vowels can be replaced with glottal stops in some varieties of Yugambeh–Bundjalung.

=== Stress ===
Yugambeh–Bundjalung is a stress-timed language and is quantity-sensitive, with stress being assigned to syllables with long vowels. Short unstressed vowels tend to be reduced to the neutral vowel schwa.

=== Syllable structure ===
Like many Australian languages, Yugambeh–Bundjalung is thought to have a constraint that states that all syllables must have a consonant onset. Only vowels are permitted as the syllable nucleus, and these may be long or short. Syllable codas are also permitted, with long or short vowels in the nucleus. However, long vowels are not permitted to occur in adjacent syllables.

=== Phonotactics ===
Consonant clusters

Yugambeh–Bundjalung does not permit clusters of the same consonant, or clusters that begin with an obstruent phoneme or end with an approximant, except the labio-velar glide. All homorganic nasal-obstruent clusters occur in the language. Clusters usually only involve two segments, but clusters of three may occur if an intervening vowel is deleted by some process.

=== Vocabulary ===
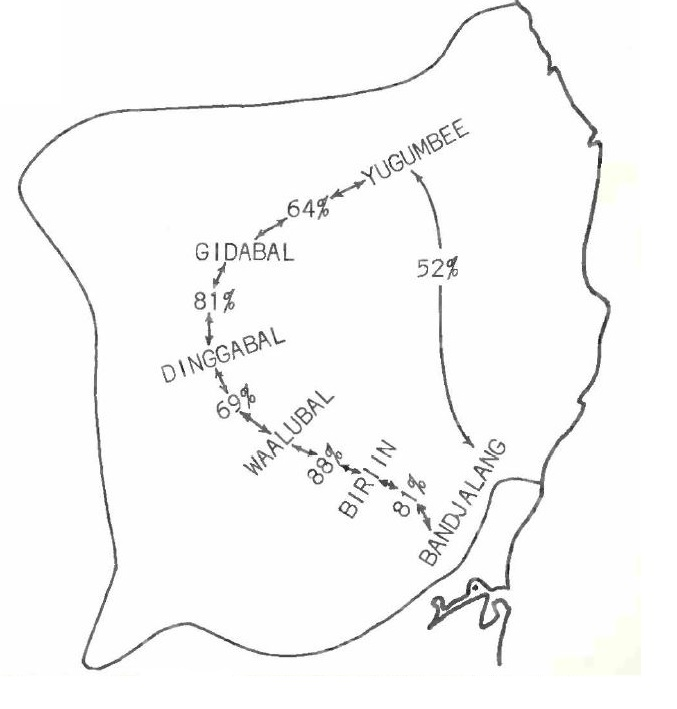
Cognate analysis percentages provided by Crowley

Cognate comparison between the most southern and northern dialects, Bandjalang (Proper) and Yugambeh (Proper), shows 52% similarity. Cognate similarity is highest between dialects within branches, typically being ~80%, these percentages are even higher amongst the Tweed–Albert dialects at ~90%. Between branches of the family this rate falls to ~60–70% between neighbouring clusters.

==== Isogloss ====
Some vocabulary differences in common vocabulary are present:

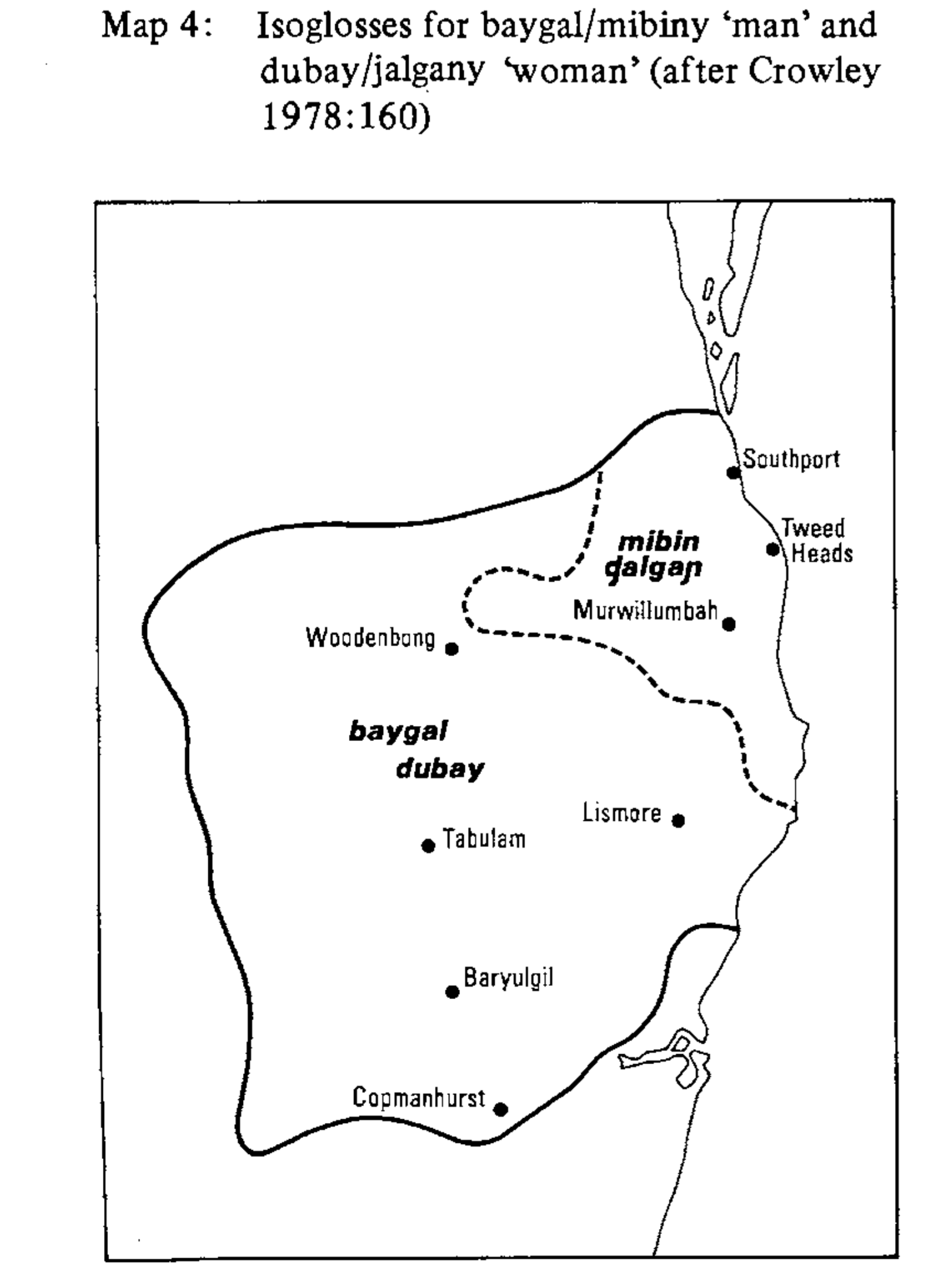
Isogloss for 'man' (mibiny/baygal) and 'woman' (jalgan/dubay)

'What/something' – nyang in southern varieties contrasts with minyang in northern varieties. (Both were used in the centrally located Lismore dialect).

The northern Tweed-Albert language have mibin for 'man' and jalgany for 'woman', compared to the use of baygal and dubay by other varieties respectively. The difference in words for men is significant as groups often use it for identification as well as a language name (Mibinah = language lit. 'of man', Baygalnah = language lit. 'of man').

Another vocabulary isogloss is jabu ('boy') and mih ('eye') used in all branches, except the Middle-Clarence language which uses janagan and jiyaw respectively.

==== Vowel shifts ====
A north to south shift of /a/ to /e/ (with an intermittent /i/ present in some varieties) in some common vocabulary.

'Who': ngahn/ngihn/ngehn
'You': wahlu/wihlu/wehlu

A north to south shift of /i/ to /a/ (with an intermittent/e/ present in some varieties) occurring on the demonstrative set.

'This': gali/gale/gala
'That': mali/male/mala

A shift of /a/ to /u/ in the Tweed-Albert dialects.

'No': yugam/yagam
'Vegetable': nungany/nangany

== Grammar ==
Crowley's research found a number of grammar differences between the varieties and clusters. Further research by Dr. Margaret Sharpe detailed these finer differences.

=== Noun declensions ===
All varieties within the family use suffixes to decline nouns. Most are universal; however, there are a few poignant differences. A complex system exists whereby suffixes are categorised into orders, with the order and use governed by universal rules.

=== Locative ===
A past and non-past form of the locative exists in Githabul, Yugambeh and Minyangbal.

=== Abessive ===
The abessive -djam is present in Yugambeh and Githabul, being used on nouns and verbs (use on verbs does not occur further south).

=== Gender ===
A system of marking four grammatical genders (two animate – human and animal, and two inanimate – arboreal and neuter) with the use of suffixes is present in three of the clusters. The morphological forms and usage of these gender suffixes vary between the clusters, with some dialects marking both demonstratives and adjectives, others marking solely adjectives.

=== Verbal morphology ===
The extensive use of suffixes extends to verbs as well; the suffix system is the same throughout the language group with a few minor differences.

The imminent aspect (used in other varieties for most instances that use the English future tense) has shifted in the Tweed-Albert Language to an irrealis mode, now denoting the potential mood, while the continuous aspect in conjunction with a time word is now used for future tense situations.

Example of differences in -hny suffix usage:

Ngayu yagahny ngumbin
I-ERG build-IMM house
'I will build a house'

Ngayu yagahny ngumbin guh
I-ERG build-POT house {over there}
'I might build a house over there'

Ngayu yagahla ngumbin guh ngulungmay
I-ERG build-CONT house {over there} shortly
'I will build a house over there shortly'

The purposive suffix is -yah in the Tweed–Albert and Condamine–Upper Clarence languages, while it is -gu in the other two branches.

Nyule yangehn ngumbin yagayah guh
he-ERG went-PST house build-PURP {over there}
'He went to build a house over there.'

Nyula yangahn ngumbin yagagu gah
he-ERG went-PST house build-PURP {over there}
'He went to build a house over there'

== Vocabulary ==
Place names
#
#	Name/word	Pronounced	Synonyms	Dialect	Meaning
1
1	Ballina			English	Accidental or deliberate corruption of the Aboriginal words bullinah and boolinah and/or balloona, balloonah, balluna, bullenah, bullina and bulluna. Alternatively, derived from the Irish town of the same name.
2
2	Bullenah		Balluna, bullina, bulluna, balloona, balloonah		'Blood running from the wounded' or 'the place of dying' or 'the place of the wounded after a fight' or 'place where a battle was fought and people were found dying'.
3
3	Bullen-bullen	"Bul-na"			'A fight'.
4
4	Bulun				'River'.
5
5	Bullinah		Boolinah		'Place of many oysters'.
6
6	Cooriki		Gurigay, hooraki, kurrachee		'The meeting of the waters'.
7
7	Coraki			English	Accidental or deliberate corruption of the Aboriginal words kurrachee, gurigay, hooraki and cooriki
8
8	Dahbalam		Tabulam	Galibal	
9
9	Gunya				'A traditional native home, made from wood and bark'.
10
10	Gum			Ngarakwal	Crossing
11
11	Gummin				'Father's mother'.
12
12	Gummingarr				'Winter camping grounds'.
13
13	Jurbihls		Djuribil	Githabul	'Refers to both a site and the spirit that resides there'.
14
14	Maniworkan				'The place where the town of Woodburn is located'.
15
15	Nguthungali-garda			Githabul	'Spirits of our grandfathers'.
16
16	Uki	"Yoo-k-eye"			'A water fern with edible roots'.
17
17	Wollumbin			Ngarakwal	'Patriarch of mountains', 'Fighting Chief', 'Place of Death and Dying', 'Site at which one of the chief warriors lies' or 'Cloud Catcher'.
18
18	Woodenbong				'Wood ducks on water'.
19
19	Wulambiny Momoli		Mount Warning	Ngarakwal	'Turkey Nest'.

Language, mythology and ceremony
#
#	Name/word	Pronounced	Synonyms	Dialect	Meaning
1
1	Dirawong	Dira-wong	Dirawonga, Goanna		Creator Being spirit that looked like a Goanna but behaved just like humans.

Human classifications
#
#	Name/word	Pronounced	Synonyms	Dialect	Meaning
1
1	Weeum	Wee-um			'Clever Man' also known as 'Man of high degree of initiation'.
2
2	Wuyun Gali	Wu-yun Ga-li			'Clever Man' also known as 'Doctor'
3
3	Cooradgi			Gidhabal and Dinggabal	'Clever Men of the tribe' who could cast spells of sleep or sleeping sickness (Hoop Pine curse) as a reprisal against offenders of tribal law, tribal codes, enemies or bad spiritual influences. The ritual coincided with the bone pointing procedure common among Aboriginal tribes throughout Australia.

Flora and fauna
#
#	Name/word	Pronounced	Synonyms	Dialect	Meaning
1
1	Jullum	Jul-lum	Jellum		Fish.
2
2	Ngumagal	Ngu-ma-gal			Goanna.
3
3	Yabbra	Yab-bra			Bird.
4
4	Wudgie-Wudgie	Wud-gie-Wud-gie			Red Cedar.

== See also ==
- Bundjalung people
- Bundjalung Nation Timeline
- Dirawong
- List of Aboriginal languages of New South Wales

== Bibliography ==
- Crowley, Terry (1978). The middle Clarence dialects of Bandjalang. Smythe, W. E. Canberra: Australian Institute of Aboriginal Studies. ISBN 0855750650. OCLC 6041138.
- Cunningham, Margaret C. (1969). "A description of the Yugumbir dialect of Bundjalung". University of Queensland Papers, Faculty of Arts. 1 (8).
- Geytenbeek, Brain B. (1964). "Morphology of the regular verbs of Gidabul". Papers on the Languages of the Australian Aborigines.
- Geytenbeek, Brian B.; Getenbeek, Helen (1971). Gidabal grammar and dictionary. Canberra: Australian Institute of Aboriginal Studies. ISBN 9780855750190.
- Geytenbeek, Helen (1964). "Personal pronouns of Gidabul". Papers on the languages of the Australian Aborigines. Occasional Papers in Aboriginal Studies. Vol. 3. Sydney: Australian Institute for Aboriginal Studies. pp. 91–100.
- Holmer, Nils M. (1971). Notes on the Bundjalung Dialect. Canberra: Australian Institute of Aboriginal Studies. ISBN 0855750219.
- Sharpe, Margaret C. (1994). An all-dialect dictionary of Bunjalung, an Australian language no longer in general use.
- Sharpe, Margaret C. (2005). "Yugambeh–Bundjalung Dialects". Grammar and texts of the Yugambeh–Bundjalung dialect chain in eastern Australia. Muenchen: Lincom Europa. ISBN 3895867845. OCLC 62185149.
