= Cabbage Tree Island (John Gould Nature Reserve) =

Island nature reserve in New South Wales, Australia

John Gould Nature Reserve
- IUCN category IV (habitat/species management area)
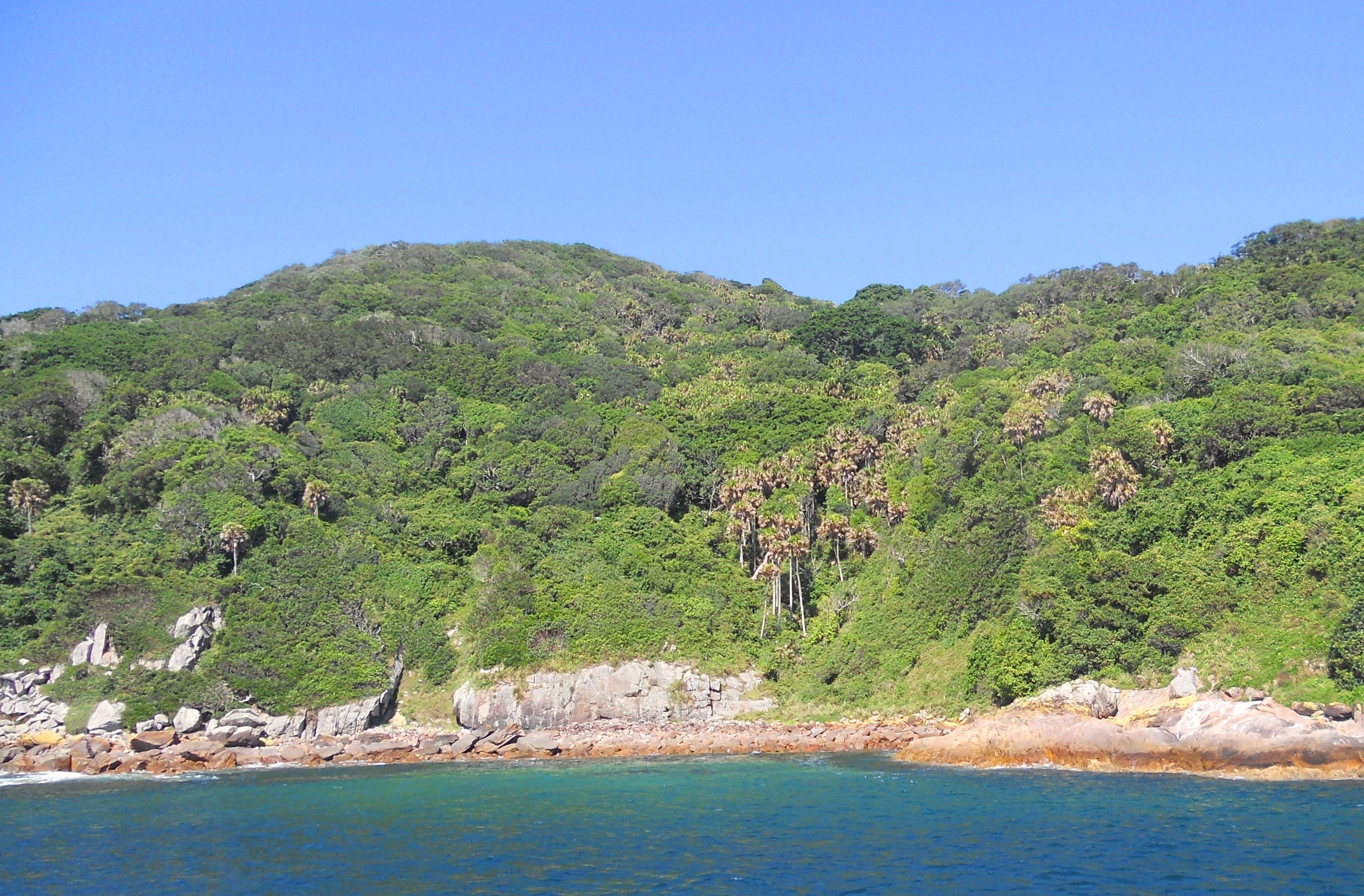
- Cabbage Tree Island, NSW, west side

- Location within New South Wales
- Location: New South Wales
- Nearest city: Shoal Bay
- Coordinates: 32°40′54″S 152°14′04″E
- Area: 30 ha (74 acres)
- Governing body: NSW National Parks and Wildlife Service

Cabbage Tree Island, also known as the John Gould Nature Reserve, is a protected nature reserve and uninhabited continental island lying 1.4 km (0.87 mi) off the mouth of Port Stephens on the coast of New South Wales, Australia.

== Description ==
Cabbage Tree Island is a small and rugged island, about 1 km (1 mi) long, on a north–south alignment, by 480 m (1,570 ft) wide. It rises abruptly to a height of 123 m (404 ft). The tree vegetation includes, as well as the cabbage-tree palms, deciduous and sandpaper figs, native plums, and bird-lime trees.

== History ==
In 1911, a penguin chick was captured on Cabbage Tree Island and taken to Maitland where an attempt was made to raise it as a pet.

=== Conservation ===
Both Cabbage Tree and Boondelbah Islands are gazetted nature reserves under the New South Wales National Parks and Wildlife Act, so protecting the island's habitat from land uses incompatible with nature conservation. Access is only permitted for scientific and conservation purposes.

=== Gould's petrel conservation management ===
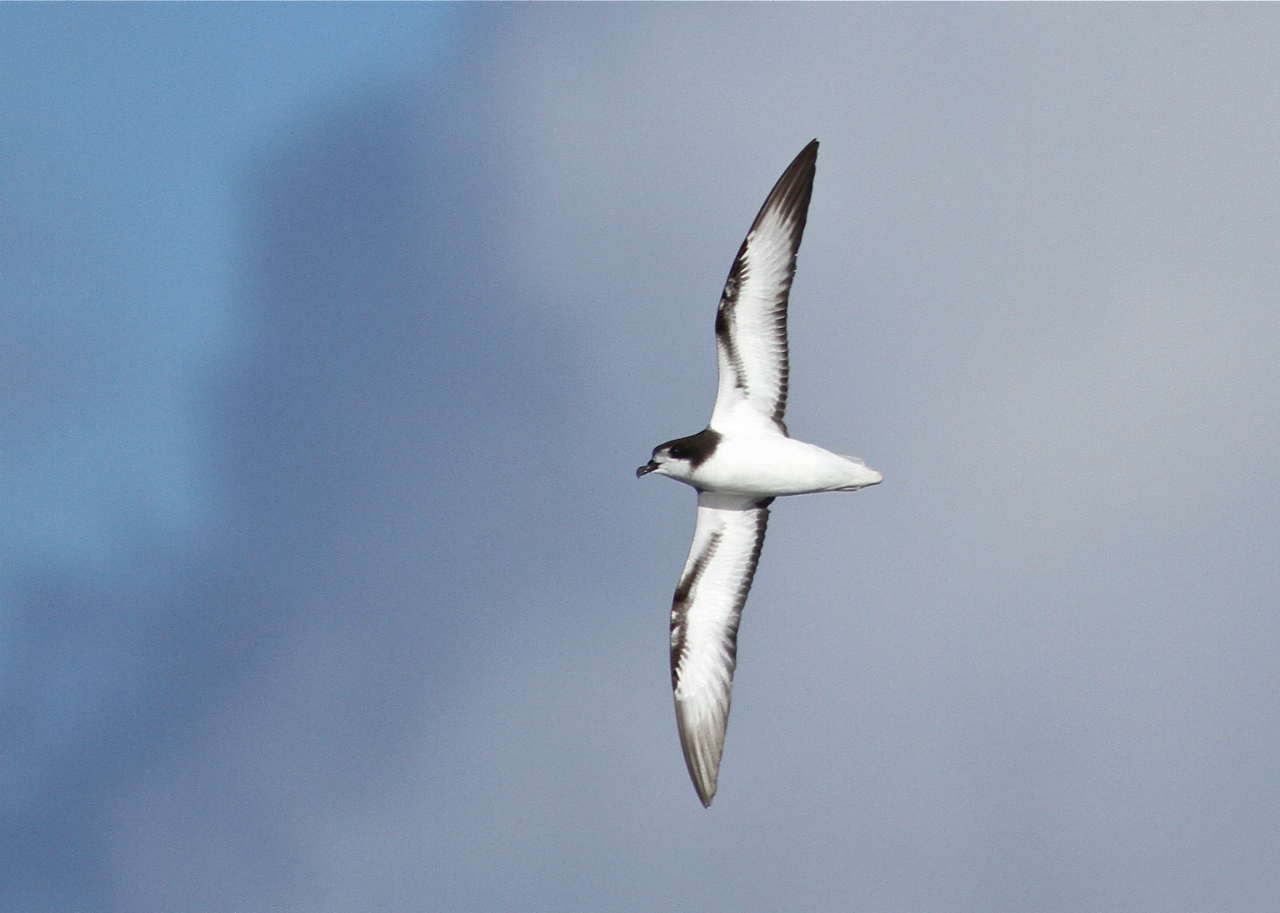
Gould's petrel in flight

The petrels nest mainly in natural rock crevices among the rock scree of two gullies on the western side of the island, but also in hollow fallen palm trunks, beneath mats of fallen palm fronds and in cavities among fig tree buttresses. They breed in colonies with the nests often less than 1 m (3 ft) apart. Before significant active management of the island commenced, the breeding population was in decline. One major contributing factor was the presence of rabbits which largely destroyed the understorey vegetation of the island and prevented its regeneration.

The removal of the sheltering understorey vegetation by rabbits led to increased exposure of the ground-nesting petrels and predation by pied currawongs and Australian ravens. It also led to increased mortality following entanglement of the birds with the sticky fruits of the bird-lime trees which fell to the ground rather than being caught in the understorey. By 1992 there were fewer than 250 breeding pairs of Gould's petrel nesting on the Island, fewer than 20% of the pairs were producing fledglings, fewer than 50 young were being produced each year, and adult mortality exceeded 50 birds each year.

Remedial management from 1992 onwards has included the eradication of rabbits on the island in 1997/98 and the removal of bird-lime trees from petrel nesting habitat, as well as the culling of currawongs and ravens. After a few pairs of Gould's petrels were discovered on Boondelbah Island in 1995, 1.5 km (1 mi) to the south, a translocation program was implemented to supplement the new breeding site with fledglings from Cabbage Tree. By 2004/05 it was estimated that the breeding colony on Cabbage Tree Island had increased to 2,500 individuals comprising 1,000 breeding pairs, that an average of 300 fledglings are produced annually, that 50% of pairs are producing fledged young, and average adult mortality is less than ten birds a year.

== See also ==
- List of islands of New South Wales
- Protected areas of New South Wales
