= Local Government (Shires) Act 1905 =

Act of the Parliament of New South Wales

Parliament of New South Wales
- Long title: An Act for the local government of rural districts, and for the amendment, extension, and partial repeal of certain Acts to effect the same; and for purposes consequent thereon or incidental thereto
- Citation: 1905 No. 33
- Enacted by: Parliament of New South Wales
- Assented to by: Governor Admiral Sir Harry Rawson
- Assented to: 9 December 1905
- Commenced: 7 March 1906
- Administered by: Department of Local Government

Related legislation
- Local Government Act 1919; Local Government Act 1993
- Status: Repealed

Local Government (Shires) Act 1905 was a landmark New South Wales statute notable for the compulsory incorporation of local government areas for around 40% of the area of New South Wales. The Act created 134 rural shires, many surrounding a small urban area separately and voluntarily incorporated under the Municipalities Act 1858 and the following Municipalities Act 1867 and Municipalities Act 1897 As well as the compulsory incorporation of rural areas, the Local Government (Shires) Act repealed the Municipalities Act - bringing local government under one legislative framework.

The Act provided the newly constituted Shires with a limited set of powers; to act as a roads board and to provide other necessary local functions such as nightsoil collection and building control. Rates were charged on what has been described as a "benefit related" basis based on the unimproved capital value of the land on the "assumption ... that land values should reflect the benefits accrued from public expenditure, such as road building and maintenance". This rating methodology encouraged development as property that had been developed and improved paid no more in rates than unimproved properties.

In the development of the Act, a Local Government Commission was established to determine the nature of the compulsory incorporation. The commission's initial report was released in March 1905, before the Act was proclaimed. It recommended the establishment of 131 areas, 15 additions to existing municipalities and 2 new municipalities. After considering objections, the Commission recommended 134 areas, to be called "Shires" and 32 additions to existing municipalities. The commission also provided the name for each Shire, avoiding where possible the use of the names of existing municipalities and usually using the name of some local, natural feature.

The design has been arranged so as to comply as far as possible with the community of interests, lines of communication, and physical features, attention being also given to the necessity of grouping each shire round a town which is about its natural centre, and from which existing roads radiate. Another consideration of a rather conflicting character was the necessity for making the shires large enough to yield sufficient revenue to defray the cost of works and administration. Boundary lines have been fixed where practicable at rivers or mountain ranges. All incorporated areas have been excluded

— The Sydney Morning Herald,

The Act was repealed with the passing of the Local Government Act 1906.

== Shires established under the Act ==
The following are the original 134 Shires proclaimed on 7 March 1906 per the Act. Over time most of these Shires were amalgamated either with each other or with its associated municipality.

Shire	Status	Notes
Abercrombie Shire	Abolished	Along with City of Bathurst and Turon Shire divided into City of Bathurst and Evans Shire on 1 October 1977.
Adjungbilly Shire	Abolished	Merged with Municipality of Gundagai to form Gundagai Shire on 1 January 1924.
Amaroo Shire	Abolished	Merged with the Municipality of Molong to form Molong Shire on 1 January 1951.
Apsley Shire	Abolished	Merged with the Municipality of Walcha to form Walcha Shire on 1 June 1955
Ashford Shire	Abolished	Merged with the Municipality of Inverell and Macintyre Shire to form Inverell Shire on 1 July 1979.
Bannockburn Shire	Abolished	Absorbed into Macintyre Shire on 15 November 1940.
Barraba Shire	Abolished	Municipality of Barraba was excised from the Shire on 23 May 1906. The Municipality was re-absorbed on 1 November 1953. Split on 17 March 2004; part merged with Yallaroi Shire and Bingara Shire to form Gwydir Shire and part merged with City of Tamworth, Manilla Shire, Nundle Shire and part of Parry Shire to form Tamworth Regional Council.
Baulkham Hills Shire	Still in existence.	Renamed The Hills Shire in 2008. Part transferred to City of Parramatta on 12 May 2016 per the Local Government (Council Amalgamations) Proclamation 2016.
Bellingen Shire	Still in existence	Divided to form Nambucca Shire on 15 December 1915. Reconstituted on 1 January 1957, gaining part of Dorrigo Shire and losing the Sawtell region to the newly constituted Coff's Harbour Shire.
Berrigan Shire	Still in existence	
Bibbenluke Shire	Abolished	Merged with the Municipality of Bombala to form Bombala Shire on 1 October 1977.
Blacktown Shire	Still in existence.	Reconstituted as a Municipality in 1961. Proclaimed a City in 1979.
Bland Shire	Still in existence.	Absorbed the Municipality of Wyalong on 1 October 1935.
Blaxland Shire	Abolished	Absorbed into City of Lithgow on 1 April 1977.
Bogan Shire	Still in existence.	Absorbed the Municipality of Nyngan on 1 January 1972.
Bolwarra Shire	Abolished	Merged with Tarro Shire and part of Kearsley Shire to form Lower Hunter Shire on 6 July 1944.
Boolooroo Shire	Abolished	Merged with Boomi Shire and Municipality of Moree to form Moree Plains Shire on 1 January 1981 per the Local Government Areas Amalgamation Act 1980
Boomi Shire	Abolished	Merged with Boolooroo Shire and Municipality of Moree to form Moree Plains Shire on 1 January 1981 per the Local Government Areas Amalgamation Act 1980
Boree Shire	Abolished	Absorbed Municipality of Cudal on 24 December 1912. Merged with Canobolas Shire, Molong Shire and part of Lyndhurst Shire to form Cabonne Shire on 1 October 1977.
Bulli Shire	Abolished	Merged with City of Wollongong, Municipality of North Illawarra and Municipality of Central Illawarra to form Municipality of Greater Wollongong on 24 September 1947.
Burrangong Shire	Abolished	Merged with Municipality of Young to form Young Shire on 1 July 1980.
Byron Shire	Still in existence.	The Municipality of Mullumbimby was excised from Byron Shire on 1 July 1908. The municipality was absorbed back into the shire on 1 October 1980.
Cambewarra Shire	Abolished	Merged with Municipality of Berry, Municipality of South Shoalhaven, Municipality of Broughton Vale, Municipality of Ulladulla, Municipality of Nowra and Clyde Shire to form Shoalhaven Shire on 1 July 1948.
Canobolas Shire	Abolished	Merged with Boree Shire, Molong Shire and part of Lyndhurst Shire to form Cabonne Shire on 1 October 1977.
Cessnock Shire	Abolished	The Municipality of Cessnock was excised from the Shire on 1 November 1926. The balance of the Shire was renamed Kearsley Shire. Absorbed Municipality of Greta on 1 January 1934. Part merged with Tarro Shire and Bolwarra Shire to form Lower Hunter Shire, part merged with the Municipality of East Maitland, Municipality of West Maitland and Municipality of Morpeth to form the Municipality of Maitland. Balance reconstituted as Kearsley Shire on 6 July 1944. Merged with Municipality of Cessnock to form Municipality of Greater Cessnock on 1 January 1957.
Clyde Shire	Abolished	Merged with Municipality of Berry, Municipality of South Shoalhaven, Municipality of Broughton Vale, Municipality of Ulladulla, Municipality of Nowra and Cambewarra Shire to form Shoalhaven Shire on 1 July 1948.
Cobborah Shire	Abolished	Renamed as Cobbora Shire on 23 April 1907 Split on 1 January 1950; part merged with Municipality of Wellington and Macquarie Shire to form Wellington Shire, part absorbed into Gulgong Shire.
Cockburn Shire	Abolished	Split on 1 January 1976; part absorbed into City of Tamworth; part merged with part of Peel Shire to form Parry Shire.
Colo Shire	Abolished	Merged with Municipality of Windsor to form Hawkesbury Shire on 1 January 1981 per the Local Government Areas Amalgamation Act 1980
Conargo Shire	Abolished	Absorbed Windouran Shire on 1 July 2001. Merged with Deniliquin Council to form Edward River Council on 12 May 2016 per the Local Government (Council Amalgamations) Proclamation 2016.
Coolah Shire	Abolished	Acquired part of Gulgong Shire on 1 January 1957. Part merged with Mudgee Shire and parts of Rylstone Shire and Merriwa Shire to form Mid-Western Regional Council on 26 May 2004. The balance of the Shire was merged with Coonabarabran Shire to form Warrumbungle Shire on 25 August 2004.
Coolamon Shire	Still in existence	
Coonabarabran Shire	Abolished	Merged with Coolah Shire to form Warrumbungle Shire on 25 August 2004.
Copmanhurst Shire	Abolished	Split on 25 February 2004; part merged with Maclean Shire, City of Grafton and Pristine Waters Shire to create Clarence Valley Council, balance merged with Richmond River Council.
Coreen Shire	Abolished	Merged with Municipality of Corowa to form Corowa Shire on 1 July 1955.
Cowcumballa Shire	Abolished	Renamed Jindalee Shire on 13 March 1907. Absorbed part of Municipality of Wallendbeen on 17 September 1935. Merged with Municipality of Cootamundra to form Cootamundra Shire on 1 April 1975.
Crookwell Shire	Abolished	Merged with parts of Gunning Shire, Mulwaree Shire and Yass Shire to form Upper Lachlan Shire on 11 February 2004.
Culcairn Shire	Abolished	Merged with Holbrook Shire and part of Hume Shire to form Greater Hume Shire on 26 May 2004.
Dalgety Shire	Abolished	Renamed Snowy River Shire on 16 August 1939. Merged with Cooma-Monaro Shire and Bombala Shire to form Snowy Monaro Regional Council per the Local Government (Council Amalgamations) Proclamation 2016.
Demondrille Shire	Abolished	Absorbed part of Municipality of Wallendbeen on 17 September 1935. Merged with Municipality of Murrumburrah to form Harden Shire on 1 January 1975.
Dorrigo Shire	Abolished	Divided to form Nymboida Shire on 5 August 1913. Split between Bellingen Shire and the newly created Coff's Harbour Shire on 1 January 1957.
Dumaresq Shire	Abolished	Merged with City of Armidale to form Armidale Dumaresq Council on 21 February 2000.
Erina Shire	Abolished	Absorbed Municipality of Gosford on 23 January 1908. Divided to form Woy Woy Shire on 1 August 1928. Divided again to re-form Municipality of Gosford on 24 October 1936. Split on 1 January 1947; part merged with Woy Woy Shire to form Wyong Shire, part merged with Municipality of Gosford to form Gosford Shire.
Eurobodalla Shire	Still in existence.	Part transferred to Monaro Shire on 20 July 1910. Absorbed Municipality of Moruya on 17 December 1913.
Germanton Shire	Abolished	Renamed Holbrook Shire. Split on 26 May 2004, part absorbed by Tumbarumba Shire, balance merged with Culcairn Shire and part of Hume Shire to form Greater Hume Shire.
Gilgandra Shire	Still in existence	
Gloucester Shire	Abolished	Merged with Great Lakes Council and City of Greater Taree to form Mid-Coast Council on 12 May 2016 per the Local Government (Council Amalgamations) Proclamation 2016.
Goobang Shire	Abolished	Absorbed Municipality of Peak Hill on 1 November 1971 Merged with Municipality of Parkes to form Parkes Shire on 1 January 1981 per the Local Government Areas Amalgamation Act 1980
Goodradigbee Shire	Abolished	Merged with Municipality of Yass to form Yass Shire on 1 January 1980.
Gostwyck Shire	Abolished	Merged with the Municipality of Uralla to form Uralla Shire on 1 January 1948.
Gundurimba Shire	Abolished	Merged along with part of Terania Shire into the City of Lismore on 1 January 1977.
Gunning Shire	Abolished	Split on 11 February 2004; part merged with Tallaganda Shire and parts of Mulwaree Shire, Yarrowlumla Shire and Gunning Shire to form Palerang Council, part merged with Crookwell Shire and parts of Mulwaree Shire and Yass Shire to form Upper Lachlan Shire part merged with Tallaganda Shire and parts of Yarrowlumla Shire and Mulwaree Shire to form Palerang Council.
Guyra Shire	Abolished	Merged with Armidale Dumaresq Council to form Armidale Regional Council on 12 May 2016 per the Local Government (Council Amalgamations) Proclamation 2016.
Gwydir Shire	Abolished	Merged with the Municipality of Bingara to form Bingara Shire on 1 January 1944.
Harwood Shire	Abolished	Merged with Municipality of Maclean to form Maclean Shire on 1 January 1957.
Hastings Shire	Abolished	Merged with the Municipality of Port Macquarie to form Municipality of Hastings on 1 January 1981 per the Local Government Areas Amalgamation Act 1980
Hornsby Shire	Still in existence.	Lost part to City of Parramatta on 12 May 2016 per the Local Government (City of Parramatta and Cumberland) Proclamation 2016.
Hume Shire	Abolished	Split on 26 May 2004; part absorbed by City of Albury, part absorbed by Corowa Shire, balance merged with Culcairn Shire and Holbrook Shire to form Greater Hume Shire.
Illabo Shire	Abolished	Merged with Municipality of Junee to form Junee Shire on 1 January 1981 per the Local Government Areas Amalgamation Act 1980
Imlay Shire	Abolished	Merged with Mumbulla Shire and the Municipality of Bega to form Bega Valley Shire on 1 January 1981 per the Local Government Areas Amalgamation Act 1980
Jemalong Shire	Abolished	Merged with Municipality of Forbes to form Forbes Shire on 1 January 1981 per the Local Government Areas Amalgamation Act 1980
Kanimbla Shire	Still in existence	Renamed Blue Mountains Shire on 22 January 1907. Municipality of Blackheath was excised from the Shire on 12 December 1919. Merged with Municipality of Blackheath and City of Katoomba to form City of Blue Mountains on 1 October 1947.
Koreelah Shire	Still in existence.	Renamed Tenterfield Shire on 13 February 1907. Absorbed the Municipality of Tenterfield on 1 January 1975.
Ku-ring-gai Shire	Still in existence.	
Kurri Kurri Shire	Abolished	Renamed Tarro Shire on 8 January 1907. Merged with Bolwarra Shire and part of Kearsley Shire to form Lower Hunter Shire on 6 July 1944.
Kyeamba Shire	Abolished	Absorbed along with Mitchell Shire into the City of Wagga Wagga on 1 January 1981 per the Local Government Areas Amalgamation Act 1980
Kyogle Shire	Still in existence.	Absorbed part of Terania Shire on 1 January 1977.
Lachlan Shire	Still in existence.	Absorbed Municipality of Condobolin on 1 April 1977
Lake Macquarie Shire	Still in existence.	Lost part to City of Newcastle per Greater Newcastle Act 1937. Proclaimed a municipality on 1 January 1977.
Liverpool Plains Shire	Abolished	Merged with Municipality of Gunnedah to form Gunnedah Shire on 1 January 1980.
Lockhart Shire	Still in existence.	
Lyndhurst Shire	Abolished	Absorbed Municipality of Blayney and Municipality of Carcoar on 12 November 1935. Split on 1 October 1977; part absorbed by City of Orange, part merged with Boree Shire, Canobolas Shire and Molong Shire to form Cabonne Shire, the balance constituted as Blayney Shire.
Macintyre Shire	Abolished	Absorbed Bannockburn Shire on 15 November 1940. Merged with the Municipality of Inverell and Ashford Shire to form Inverell Shire on 1 July 1979.
Macleay Shire	Abolished	Merged with Municipality of Kempsey to form Kempsey Shire on 1 October 1975.
Macquarie Shire	Abolished	Merged with Municipality of Wellington and part of Cobbora Shire on 1 January 1950 to form Wellington Shire
Mandowa Shire	Abolished	Merged with the Municipality of Manilla to form Manilla Shire on 1 January 1960.
Manning Shire	Abolished	Split on 1 January 1981 per the Local Government Areas Amalgamation Act 1980; part merged with Municipality of Taree and Municipality of Wingham to form City of Greater Taree, balance absorbed by Great Lakes Shire.
Marthaguy Shire	Abolished	Merged with the Municipality of Warren to form Warren Shire on 1 January 1957.
Meroo Shire	Abolished	Merged with the Municipality of Cudgegong to form Cudgegong Shire on 2 May 1924.
Merriwa Shire	Abolished	Split on 26 May 2004; part merged with parts of Coolah Shire, Mudgee Shire and Rylstone Shire to form Mid-Western Regional Council, part absorbed by Upper Hunter Shire.
Mitchell Shire	Abolished	Absorbed along with Kyeamba Shire into the City of Wagga Wagga on 1 January 1981 per the Local Government Areas Amalgamation Act 1980
Monaro Shire	Abolished	Merged with Municipality of Cooma to form Cooma-Monaro Shire on 1 January 1981 per the Local Government Areas Amalgamation Act 1980
Mulwaree Shire	Abolished	Split on 11 February 2004; part merged with City of Goulburn to form Goulburn Mulwaree Council, part merged with Tallaganda Shire and parts of Yarrowlumla Shire and Gunning Shire to form Palerang Council, part merged with Crookwell Shire and parts of Gunning Shire and Yass Shire to form Upper Lachlan Shire.
Mumbulla Shire	Abolished	Merged with Imlay Shire and the Municipality of Bega to form Bega Valley Shire on 1 January 1981 per the Local Government Areas Amalgamation Act 1980
Murrungal Shire	Abolished	Merged with the Municipality of Burrowa to form Boorowa Shire on 1 September 1944.
Murray Shire	Abolished	Absorbed Municipality of Moama on 1 January 1953. Merged with Wakool Shire to form Murray River Council on 12 May 2016 per the Local Government (Council Amalgamations) Proclamation 2016.
Murrumbidgee Shire	Abolished	Merged with Jerilderie Shire to form Murrumbidgee Council on 12 May 2016 per the Local Government (Council Amalgamations) Proclamation 2016.
Namoi Shire	Abolished	Absorbed the Municipality of West Narrabri on 9 June 1937. Merged with Municipality of Narrabri to form Narrabri Shire on 1 January 1981 per the Local Government Areas Amalgamation Act 1980
Narraburra Shire	Abolished	Merged with Municipality of Temora to form Temora Shire on 1 January 1981 per the Local Government Areas Amalgamation Act 1980
Nattai Shire	Abolished	Absorbed Municipality of Mittagong on 1 January 1939. Renamed Mittagong Shire in 1949 Along with Municipality of Bowral absorbed into Wingecarribee Shire on 1 January 1981 per the Local Government Areas Amalgamation Act 1980
Nepean Shire	Abolished	Absorbed Municipality of Mulgoa on 1 July 1913. Split on 1 January 1949 per the Local Government (Areas) Act 1948; Riding A was absorbed along with Municipality of St Mary's and Municipality of Castlereagh into the Municipality of Penrith, Riding B was absorbed into the Municipality of Liverpool, Riding C was absorbed into the Municipality of Camden.
Nundle Shire	Abolished	Merged with City of Tamworth, Manilla Shire and parts of Parry Shire and Barraba Shire to form Tamworth Regional Council on 17 March 2004.
Oberon Shire	Still in existence	Absorbed part of the abolished Evans Shire on 26 May 2004.
Orara Shire	Abolished	Split on 1 January 1957; part absorbed along with the Municipality of South Grafton and parts of Copmanhurst Shire into the City of Grafton, part merged with the Municipality of Maclean to form Maclean Shire, part merged with Municipality of Ulmurra to form Ulmurra Shire.
Patrick Plains Shire	Abolished	Merged with Municipality of Singleton to form Singleton Shire on 1 January 1976.
Peel Shire	Abolished	Split on 1 January 1976; part absorbed into City of Tamworth; part merged with part of Cockburn Shire to form Parry Shire.
Port Stephens Shire	Still in existence.	Absorbed Municipality of Raymond Terrace on 4 June 1937.
Rylstone Shire	Abolished	Split on 26 May 2004; part merged with parts of Coolah Shire, Mudgee Shire and Merriwa Shire to form Mid-Western Regional Council, part absorbed by City of Lithgow.
Severn Shire	Abolished	Split on 15 September 2004; part absorbed by Tenterfield Shire, balance merged with Municipality of Glen Innes to form Glen Innes Severn Council.
Stroud Shire	Abolished	Renamed Great Lakes Shire on 25 September 1971. Abolished and merged with Gloucester Shire and City of Greater Taree to form Mid-Coast Council on 12 May 2016 per the Local Government (Council Amalgamations) Proclamation 2016.
Sutherland Shire	Still in existence	
Talbragar Shire	Abolished	Absorbed into the City of Dubbo on 1 March 1980.
Tallaganda Shire	Abolished	Merged with parts of Yarrowlumla Shire, Mulwaree Shire and Gunning Shire to form Palerang Council on 11 February 2004.
Tamarang Shire	Abolished	Merged with Municipality of Quirindi to form Quirindi Shire on 1 January 1981 per the Local Government Areas Amalgamation Act 1980
Terania Shire	Abolished	Split on 1 January 1977; part merged with part of Gundurimba Shire into the City of Lismore, part absorbed into Kyogle Shire.
Timbrebongie Shire	Abolished	Merged with Municipality of Narromine to form Narromine Shire on 1 January 1981 per the Local Government Areas Amalgamation Act 1980
Tintenbar Shire	Abolished	Merged with Municipality of Ballina to form Ballina Shire on 1 January 1977.
Tomki Shire	Abolished	Split on 1 January 1976; part absorbed by the Municipality of Casino and part merged with Woodburn Shire to form Richmond River Shire.
Tumbarumba Shire	Abolished	Absorbed part of Holbrook Shire on 26 May 2004. Merged with Tumut Shire to form Snowy Valleys Council on 12 May 2016 per the Local Government (Council Amalgamations) Proclamation 2016.
Turon Shire	Abolished	Absorbed Municipality of Hill End on 17 June 1908. Along with City of Bathurst and Abercrombie Shire divided into City of Bathurst and Evans Shire on 1 October 1977.
Tweed Shire	Still in existence.	Absorbed Municipality of Murwillumbah on 1 January 1947.
Urana Shire	Abolished	Merged with Corowa Shire to form Federation Council on 12 May 2016 per the Local Government (Council Amalgamations) Proclamation 2016.
Wakool Shire	Abolished	Merged with Murray Shire to form Murray River Council on 12 May 2016 per the Local Government (Council Amalgamations) Proclamation 2016.
Walgett Shire	Still in existence.	The previously unincorporated area containing the town of Lightning Ridge was added to the Shire on 1 April 1957.
Wallarobba Shire	Abolished	Merged with Municipality of Dungog to form Dungog Shire on 1 July 1958.
Waradgery Shire	Abolished	Merged with Municipality of Hay to form Hay Shire on 1 January 1965.
Warrah Shire	Abolished	Merged with Municipality of Murrurundi to form Murrurundi Shire on 1 October 1948.
Warringah Shire	Abolished	Merged with Manly Council and Pittwater Council to form Northern Beaches Council on 12 May 2016 per the Local Government (Council Amalgamations) Proclamation 2016.
Waugoola Shire	Abolished	Merged with Municipality of Cowra to form Cowra Shire on 1 January 1981 per the Local Government Areas Amalgamation Act 1980.
Weddin Shire	Still in existence.	Absorbed Municipality of Grenfell on 1 July 1975
Willandra Shire	Still in existence.	Renamed Carrathool Shire on 13 February 1907. Absorbed Municipality of Hillston on 15 November 1943. Wade Shire was excised from its territory on 6 January 1928 per the provisions of the Irrigation Act 1912.
Windouran Shire	Abolished	Absorbed into Conargo Shire on 1 July 2001.
Wingadee Shire	Abolished	Merged with Municipality of Coonamble to form Coonamble Shire on 1 May 1952.
Wingecarribee Shire	Still in existence.	Absorbed Municipality of Moss Vale on 10 February 1933. Absorbed Municipality of Bowral and Mittagong Shire on 1 January 1981 per the Local Government Areas Amalgamation Act 1980
Wollondilly Shire	Still in existence.	Absorbed Municipality of Picton on 1 May 1940.
Woodburn Shire	Abolished	Absorbed Municipality of Coraki on 1 January 1934. Merged with part of Tomki Shire to form Richmond River Shire on 1 January 1976.
Wooluma Shire	Abolished	Renamed Woolooma Shire on 13 February 1907. Renamed Upper Hunter Shire on 11 April 1917. Absorbed Municipality of Aberdeen on 7 October 1937. Merged with the Municipality of Scone to form Scone Shire on 1 January 1958.
Wunnamurra Shire	Abolished	Merged with Municipality of Jerilderie to form Jerilderie Shire on 13 December 1918.
Wyaldra Shire	Abolished	Merged with Municipality of Gulgong to form Gulgong Shire on 1 January 1941.
Wybong Shire	Abolished	Renamed Muswellbrook Shire on 6 March 1907. Renamed Denman Shire on 10 April 1968. Abolished and merged with the Municipality of Muswellbrook to form Muswellbrook Shire on 1 July 1979.
Yallaroi Shire	Abolished	Absorbed Municipality of Warialda on 1 January 1925. Merged with Bingara Shire and part of Barraba Shire to form Gwydir Shire on 17 March 2004.
Yanko Shire	Abolished	Willimbong Shire was excised from its territory on 6 January 1928 per the provisions of the Irrigation Act 1912. Merged with Municipality of Narrandera to form Narrandera Shire on 1 January 1960.
Yarrangobilly Shire	Abolished	Renamed Gadara Shire on 12 February 1907. Merged with Municipality of Tumut to form Tumut Shire on 1 July 1928.
Yarrowlumla Shire	Abolished	Lost part to create Australian Capital Territory in 1909 per the Seat of Government Surrender Act 1909. Split between Palerang Council, Yass Valley Council, City of Queanbeyan, Tumut Shire and Cooma-Monaro Shire on 11 February 2004.
