= Local government in New South Wales =

New South Wales LGAs by largest council faction as of December 2022

Map of Local Government Areas in New South Wales

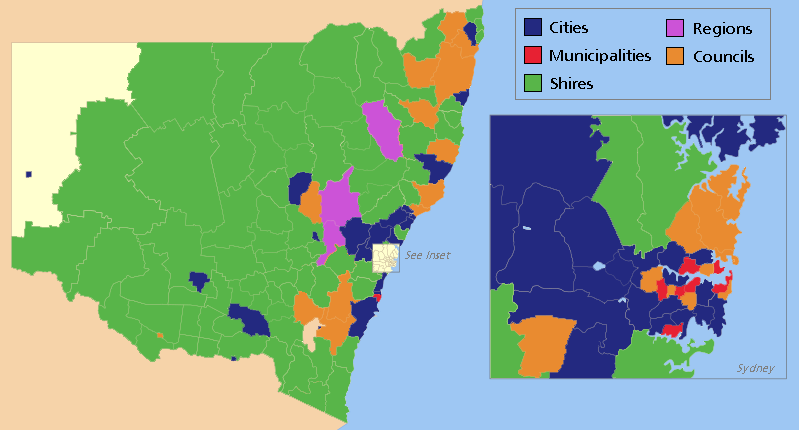
Types and titles of LGAs in New South Wales

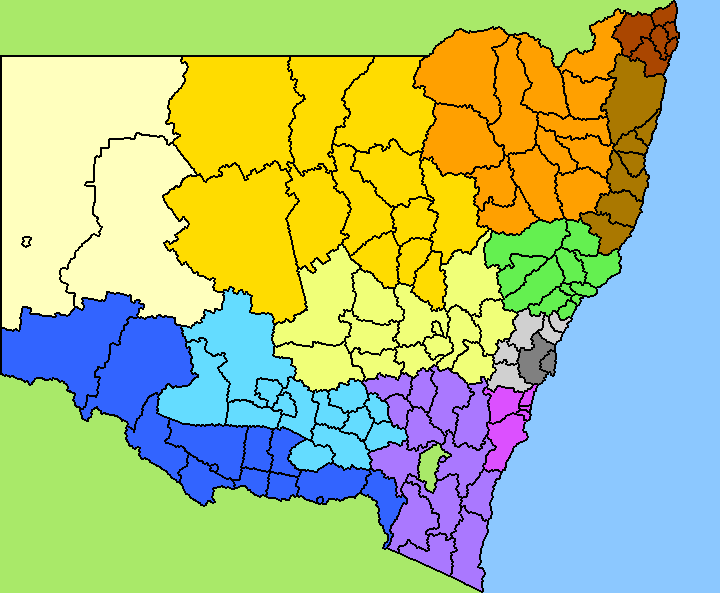
LGA Regions in New South Wales

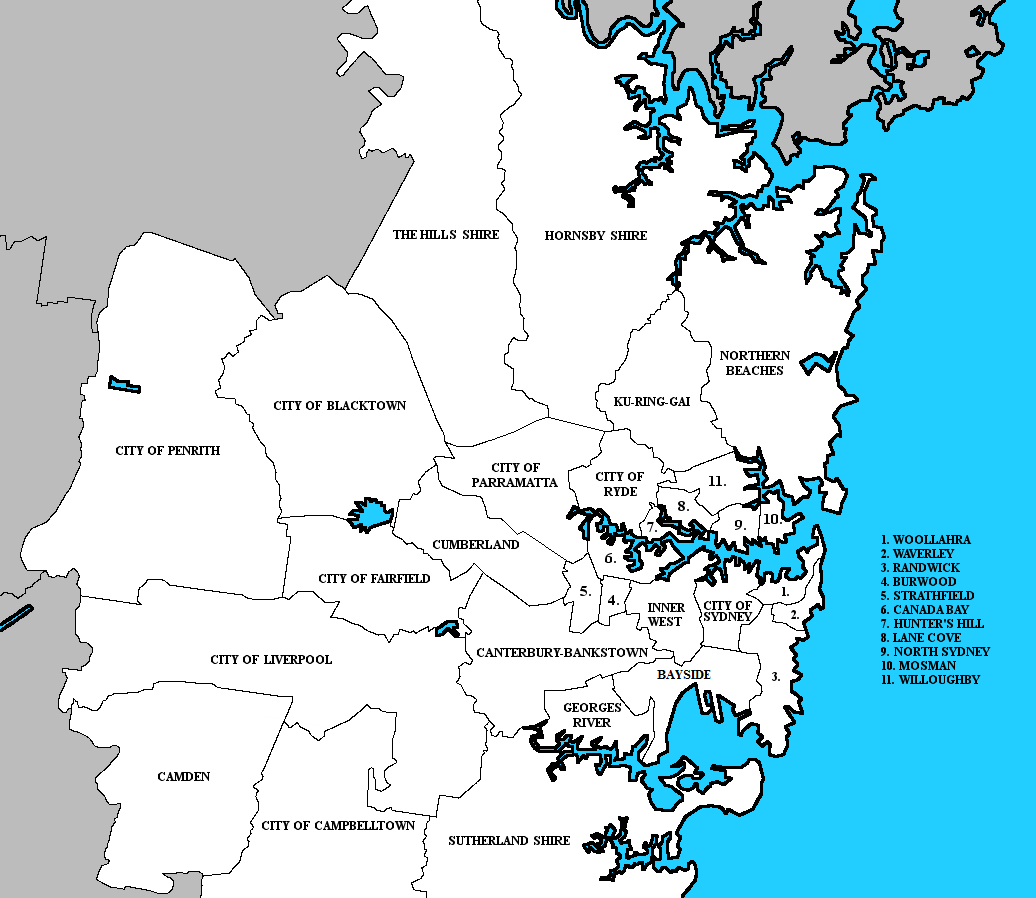
Local government areas in Sydney

The local government areas (LGA) of New South Wales are the third tier of government in the Australian state. Under the Australian Constitution there are only two tiers of government in Australia, state and federal, LGAs exist as a result of state government legislation. Under the Local Government Act 1993 they can manage their own affairs to the extent permitted by the legislation. They may be designated as cities or otherwise as areas, though the latter units may choose to use titles that had distinctions under older forms of the act. The smallest local government by area in the state is the Municipality of Hunter's Hill 5.7 km^{2} (2.2 sq mi) and the largest by area is Central Darling Shire Council 53,492 km^{2} (20,653 sq mi). There are 129 local government areas in the state as of December 2022.

Local government authorities provide a wide range of services. The most important of these are the general services of administration, health, community amenities, recreation and culture, roads and debt servicing throughout the area controlled by the council. Councils also provide a range of trading activities, mainly in country areas of NSW. These trading activities include water supply, sewerage services, gas services and abattoir facilities.

Administered by the state government and subject to periodic restructuring involving voluntary and involuntary amalgamation of areas, local government areas are considered a city when an area has received city status by proclamation of the governor. Some areas retain designations they held under prior legislation, even though these titles no longer indicate a legal status. These may be towns, municipalities, regions, or shires. Many councils now choose not to use any area title, and simply refer to themselves as councils, e.g. Northern Beaches Council, Burwood Council.

== History ==
=== Legislation ===
The formation of local government in New South Wales predates the formation of responsible government in the state. The Sydney Corporation was formed in 1842, an elected body to manage primary services such as street lighting and drainage. The Municipalities Act 1858 introduced a system of local government. Municipalities were compulsorily incorporated by legislation in 1876, the third Municipalities Act 1897 consolidated municipal law, and in 1905 the Local Government (Shires) Act 1905 was enacted to establish shires. The Local Government Act 1906 reformed the municipal system, replaced by the Local Government Act 1919, which lasted until the most recent 1993 act.

The core principles of the 1993 legislative reforms were:

1. greater accountability by councils to their communities through better reporting, management plans, consultation on key issues, and access to information;
2. changes to the relationship between councillors and staff, whereby the elected council held all powers given under the Act, but could delegate most powers and appoint General Managers to have responsibility for “day-to-day” management, council staff and financial resources; and
3. a better distinction between service provision and regulatory activity was drawn. Maximum flexibility was given in respect to service provision, with some constraints, and accountability was increased. In regard to regulatory functions, proper attention had to be given to due process and procedural correctness.

=== Reviews of local government areas ===
NSW LGAs over time
Year	Number of LGAs	Ref.
1906	327	
1910	324	
1991	176	
1992	177	
2001	173	
2004	152	
2016	132	

The NSW Government has undertaken periodic reviews of local government since the early 1900s. Reforms included providing enfranchisement for women and for residents who did not own property in the LGA, standardising land valuation systems, and the introduction of ordinances.

==== 1930s ====
The Greater Newcastle Act 1937 amalgamated 10 municipalities with the City of Newcastle to form Greater Newcastle.

==== 1940s ====
In the post-war period, the Labor Party government of James McGirr, led by Joseph Cahill as Minister for Local Government, decided, following the recommendations of the 1945–46 Royal Commission John Clancy led by on Local Government Boundaries, that Local Government reform would assist the process of improving state infrastructure and community facilities. This vision for a local government reform agenda, including large-scale amalgamations, was largely implemented in the Sydney basin through the Local Government (Areas) Act 1948.

==== 1970s ====
The Barnett Committee Review of Local Government Areas, conducted during 1973–74, sought to create stronger economic LGAs through a substantial reduction in council numbers. The Barnett Report recommended the forced merging of the then 223 existing local government entities into 97 districts; a proposal that was initially rejected by the Robert Askin–led coalition government. However, by 1980 and after several references to the NSW Local Government Boundaries Commission, the Neville Wran-led Labor government amalgamated 38 councils into 17 entities.

The Bains Review of 1978 influenced the adoption of corporate management in councils whereby council affairs were dealt with as a whole and with co-ordinated forward planning, comprehensive distribution of resources and proper performance monitoring. Bains' review had major influence on the engagement of more powerful general managers, councillors becoming policy makers, and staff free from administrative councillor interference.

==== 1980s ====
Completed by the NSW Local Government Boundaries Commission, this review focused on the efficiencies in the mergers of rural and regional councils and the anticipated economies of scale in service provision. The Local Government Areas Amalgamation Act 1980 saw the amalgamation of many municipalities with the shires that neighboured — and in some instances, surrounded them.

==== 1990s ====
The Bob Carr-led Labor government initiated the Local Government Reform Task Force of 1995–97, the principal outcome of which was to promote resource sharing through the various regional organisations of councils. Triggered by a paper issued by the NSW Local Government and Shires Association, twenty-one councils reviewed their own position and explored three options including the status quo, models for resource sharing and a merger. However, only four councils entered into voluntary mergers in order to avoid potential forced amalgamations.

==== 2000s ====
The Sproats Inquiry into the structure of local government in eight council areas of the Inner City and Eastern Suburbs of Sydney was commissioned by the state government in October 2000. Despite recommendations for mergers, with the Carr government maintaining a no-forced amalgamation policy, no mergers transpired until late 2008 when Sproats was invited to review his earlier paper, including revisiting the controversial proposal to amalgamate the City of Sydney Council with the South Sydney City Council.

The Carr government abandoned its policy of no forced mergers after the 2003 state election. Within a year, regional "super" councils were legislated for Inner Sydney, surrounding Canberra, Goulburn and Tamworth; four general purpose and two county councils were merged in Clarence Valley, as well as a number of other smaller-scale rural council amalgamations.

==== 2010s ====
In October 2013, the NSW Government released the findings of an independent review of local government in New South Wales. The review findings, entitled Revitalising Local Government, examined historical and projected demographic data, financial sustainability, and other measures and projected the long-term viability of all local government bodies in the state. Included in the report were 65 recommendations to the government.

The government released its response to the review findings in September 2014 and then facilitated discussions with certain local government authorities with a view towards merger or amalgamation. In April 2015, the NSW Government referred the review findings and its responses to the NSW Independent Pricing and Regulatory Tribunal (IPART) to act as the Expert Advisory Panel and to review local council Fit for the Future proposals. Releasing its final report in October 2015, the IPART reviewed submissions from local government authorities and others with a view towards establishing authorities that have the scale and capacity to engage effectively across community, industry and government, are sustainable and efficient, and that effectively manage infrastructure and deliver services for local communities. The IPART found that:

- 71 per cent of councils in metropolitan Sydney were 'not fit', primarily because councils did not propose a merger despite clear benefits; and
- 56 per cent of councils in regional NSW were 'not fit', due to not proposing a merger despite clear benefits, ongoing deficits or both.

The IPART proposed a series of council mergers and amalgamation in both metropolitan and regional areas which proposed a reduction in the number of councils from 152 to 112. The NSW Government invited local government authorities to respond by 20 November 2015. Public response to the proposed amalgamations was mixed. Following consideration of the submissions, the Minister for Local Government referred merger proposals to the Chief Executive of the Office of Local Government (OLG) for examination and report under the Local Government Act 1993. The OLG Chief Executive delegated the examination and reporting functions to Delegates who conducted public inquiries and invited further written submissions by 28 February 2016. On 12 May 2016, following a further review by the Minister for Local Government and the independent Local Government Boundaries Commission, Premier Mike Baird announced the creation of 19 new councils, through amalgamations and mergers, with immediate effect. The Minister indicated in principle support to create a further nine new councils, subject to the decision of the courts. On the same day, the Governor of New South Wales acted on the advice of the Minister, and proclaimed the 19 new local government areas.

On 9 May 2016, Strathfield Council challenged the proposed merger between Strathfield, Burwood and Canada Bay councils and commenced proceedings in the New South Wales Land and Environment Court. After the Court heard that there were legal flaws in the report from the State Government-appointed delegate who examined the proposal for merging the councils, on 31 May, the NSW Government withdrew from the case and the merger proposal stalled. Mosman, Hunters Hill, North Sydney, Ku-ring-gai, Woollahra, Oberon and Walcha councils also challenged the Government's amalgamations. The proclamation of the new Bayside Council occurred on 9 September 2016, following the conclusion of legal action by Botany Bay City Council in the Court of Appeal. In December, the NSW Court of Appeal unanimously dismissed Woollahra Council's appeal, finding no merit in its arguments that the proposed merger with its neighbouring councils was invalid. In July 2017, the Berejiklian government decided to abandon the forced merger of the Sydney local government areas, following an earlier move to abandon proposed forced mergers in rural and regional NSW.

==== 2021 iVote failures ====
During the 2021 local elections, the online voting system "iVote" had technical issues that caused some access problems for some voters. Analysis done of these failures indicated a significant chance of having impacted on the electoral results for the final councillors. In Kempsey, where the margin between the last elected and first non-elected candidate was only 69 votes, the electoral commission determined that the outage caused a 60% chance that the wrong final candidate was elected, Singleton was a 40% chance the wrong councillor, Shellharbour was a 7% chance and two other races impacted by a potential sub-1% chance of having elected the wrong candidate. The NSW Supreme Court ordered re-run elections in Kempsey, Singleton and Shellharbour Ward A. In Kempsey, the highest placed non-elected candidate from 2021, Dean Saul, was instead one the first councillors elected. This failure caused the NSW Government to suspend the iVote system from use in the 2023 New South Wales state election.

== County councils ==
County councils are established by groups of local government areas which wish to cooperate in the provision of certain services. Under the Local Government Act 1993, county councils can only exist for specific purposes, which must be identified by the proclamation of the Governor which establishes them; but, it is possible for a single county council to perform two or more unrelated functions (e.g. both water supply and weed management), provided all those functions are specifically enumerated in the proclamation which established it. Each county council has its own budget, assets and liabilities, general manager and staff; the council is not directly elected, but rather composed of delegates of the member local government areas. Although historically county councils existed even in metropolitan areas, where they once played a major role in electricity distribution, by the 2020s only nine remained, all in regional areas.

== Political composition ==
The most recent local government elections were held on 14 September 2024.

=== Council totals ===
LGA	Seats (excluding directly elected mayors)					
LGA	Labor	Liberal	Greens	Libertarian	Independents (Note: Including local groups (not to be confused with locally-registered political parties).)	Others (Note: Including other registered political parties and independents aligned with, but not endorsed by, political parties.)
Albury	1	Did not contest	1	Did not contest	7	Did not contest
Armidale	1	Did not contest	1	Did not contest	7	Did not contest
Ballina	0	0	3	Did not contest	6	0
Balranald	Did not contest	Did not contest	Did not contest	Did not contest	8	Did not contest
Bathurst	Did not contest	Did not contest	1	Did not contest	1	7
Bayside	6	5	1	Did not contest	1	2
Bega Valley	2	Did not contest	1	Did not contest	6	0
Bellingen	Did not contest	Did not contest	2	Did not contest	3	1
Berrigan	Did not contest	Did not contest	Did not contest	Did not contest	7	Did not contest
Blacktown	8	6	1	Did not contest	0	0
Bland	1	Did not contest	Did not contest	Did not contest	7	1
Blayney	Did not contest	Did not contest	Did not contest	Did not contest	6	1
Blue Mountains	9	Did not contest	2	0	1	0
Bogan	Did not contest	Did not contest	Did not contest	Did not contest	9	Did not contest
Bourke	Did not contest	Did not contest	Did not contest	Did not contest	9	Did not contest
Brewarrina	Did not contest	Did not contest	1	Did not contest	8	Did not contest
Broken Hill	2	Did not contest	Did not contest	Did not contest	7	Did not contest
Burwood	4	2	Did not contest	Did not contest	Did not contest	0
Byron	2	0	3	Did not contest	0	3
Cabonne	Did not contest	Did not contest	Did not contest	Did not contest	8	1
Camden	3	1	0	2	3	0
Campbelltown	6	Did not contest	2	Did not contest	1	6
Canada Bay	3	4	1	Did not contest	0	0
Canterbury-Bankstown	8	3	1	0	1	2
Carrathool	Did not contest	Did not contest	Did not contest	Did not contest	10	Did not contest
Central Coast	5	5	0	Did not contest	5	0
Central Darling	No election					
Cessnock	7	0	0	0	6	0
Clarence Valley	Did not contest	Did not contest	1	Did not contest	6	2
Cobar	Did not contest	1	Did not contest	Did not contest	11	Did not contest
Coffs Harbour	1	Did not contest	1	Did not contest	Did not contest	6
Coolamon	Did not contest	Did not contest	Did not contest	Did not contest	8	1
Coonamble	Did not contest	Did not contest	Did not contest	Did not contest	9	Did not contest
Cootamundra-Gundagai	1	Did not contest	Did not contest	Did not contest	7	1
Cowra	Did not contest	Did not contest	Did not contest	Did not contest	7	2 (Note: 1 Independent National and 1 Independent Labor)
Cumberland	5	4	1	0	2	3
Dubbo	3	Did not contest	Did not contest	Did not contest	6	2
Dungog	1	Did not contest	Did not contest	Did not contest	6	Did not contest
Edward River	Did not contest	2	Did not contest	Did not contest	7	0
Eurobodalla	1	Did not contest	1	0	0	7
Fairfield	2	Did not contest	Did not contest	Did not contest	1	10
Federation	Did not contest	Did not contest	Did not contest	Did not contest	7	2
Forbes	Did not contest	Did not contest	Did not contest	Did not contest	8	1
Georges River	6	3	0	0	1	5
Gilgandra	Did not contest	Did not contest	Did not contest	Did not contest	7	2
Glen Innes Severn	Did not contest	Did not contest	1	Did not contest	5	1
Goulburn Mulwaree	2	Did not contest	Did not contest	Did not contest	4	3
Greater Hume	Did not contest	0	Did not contest	Did not contest	9	Did not contest
Griffith	Did not contest	1	Did not contest	Did not contest	8	Did not contest
Gunnedah	1	Did not contest	Did not contest	Did not contest	4	3 (Note: 2 Independent National and 1 Independent Labor)
Gwydir	Did not contest	Did not contest	Did not contest	Did not contest	9	0
Hawkesbury	1	4	1	0	4	2
Hay	Did not contest	Did not contest	Did not contest	Did not contest	8	Did not contest
Hilltops	Did not contest	Did not contest	Did not contest	Did not contest	11	Did not contest
Hornsby	2	4	2	0	1	0
Hunter's Hill	Did not contest	4	Did not contest	Did not contest	2	Did not contest
Inner West	7	1	5	0	1	0
Inverell	Did not contest	Did not contest	Did not contest	Did not contest	9	Did not contest
Junee	Did not contest	Did not contest	Did not contest	Did not contest	5	3
Kempsey	Did not contest	Did not contest	1	Did not contest	7	Did not contest
Kiama	2	Did not contest	1	Did not contest	Did not contest	6
Ku-ring-gai	Did not contest	4	Did not contest	Did not contest	6	Did not contest
Kyogle	Did not contest	Did not contest	Did not contest	Did not contest	9	0
Lachlan	Did not contest	Did not contest	Did not contest	Did not contest	9	Did not contest
Lake Macquarie	5	3	0	Did not contest	1	3
Lane Cove	2	0	1	0	6	0
Leeton	Did not contest	Did not contest	Did not contest	Did not contest	7	2 (Note: 1 Independent Labor and 1 Independent Liberal)
Lismore	2	Did not contest	2	0	1	5
Lithgow	Did not contest	Did not contest	Did not contest	Did not contest	9	Did not contest
Liverpool	4	5	Did not contest			
Liverpool Plains	Did not contest	Did not contest	Did not contest	Did not contest	7	0
Lockhart	Did not contest	Did not contest	Did not contest	Did not contest	9	Did not contest
Maitland	4	1	0	Did not contest	7	0
Mid-Coast	2	Did not contest	2	3	5	Did not contest
Mid-Western	1	Did not contest	0	Did not contest	8	0
Moree Plains	Did not contest	Did not contest	Did not contest	Did not contest	9	Did not contest
Mosman	0	Did not contest	1	Did not contest	1	4
Murray River	Did not contest	0	Did not contest	Did not contest	9	Did not contest
Murrumbidgee	Did not contest	Did not contest	Did not contest	Did not contest	9	Did not contest
Muswellbrook	Did not contest	Did not contest	Did not contest	Did not contest	11	1 (Note: 1 Independent Labor)
Nambucca Valley	1	Did not contest	1	Did not contest	6	Did not contest
Narrabri	Did not contest	Did not contest	Did not contest	Did not contest	9	Did not contest
Narrandera	Did not contest	Did not contest	Did not contest	Did not contest	9	Did not contest
Narromine	Did not contest	Did not contest	Did not contest	Did not contest	7	2
Newcastle	5	2	3	Did not contest	2	1
North Sydney	2	2	1	Did not contest	5	0
Northern Beaches	0	1	4	Did not contest	2	8
Oberon	Did not contest	Did not contest	Did not contest	Did not contest	9	0
Orange	1	Did not contest	1	Did not contest	9	Did not contest
Parkes	Did not contest	Did not contest	Did not contest	0	10	0
Parramatta	6	6	1	0	0	2
Penrith	9	2	0	1	3	Did not contest
Port Macquarie-Hastings	1	1	1	1	0	4
Port Stephens	4	2	0	0	4	0
Queanbeyan-Palerang	3	3	1	Did not contest	1	3
Randwick	6	5	3	Did not contest	1	Did not contest
Richmond Valley	Did not contest	Did not contest	Did not contest	Did not contest	2	4
Ryde	3	7	1	Did not contest	1	Did not contest
Shellharbour	3	Did not contest	Did not contest	Did not contest	5	Did not contest
Shoalhaven	3	Did not contest	0	Did not contest	3	6
Singleton	2	Did not contest	0	1	6	Did not contest
Snowy Monaro	2	1	0	Did not contest	6	2
Snowy Valleys	Did not contest	1	Did not contest	1	7	0
Strathfield	2	3	0	Did not contest	2	0
Sutherland	5	6	0	0	4	0
Sydney	2	1	2	0	1	3
Tamworth	1	Did not contest	1	Did not contest	7	Did not contest
Temora	Did not contest	Did not contest	Did not contest	Did not contest	7	2
Tenterfield	Did not contest	Did not contest	Did not contest	Did not contest	10	Did not contest
The Hills	3	8	1	Did not contest	0	Did not contest
Tweed	1	2	1	Did not contest	1	2
Upper Hunter	Did not contest	Did not contest	Did not contest	Did not contest	7	2
Upper Lachlan	Did not contest	Did not contest	Did not contest	1	7	1
Uralla	Did not contest	Did not contest	Did not contest	Did not contest	8	Did not contest
Wagga Wagga	1	Did not contest	1	Did not contest	0	7
Walcha	Did not contest	Did not contest	Did not contest	Did not contest	8	Did not contest
Walgett	Did not contest	Did not contest	Did not contest	Did not contest	9	Did not contest
Warren	Did not contest	Did not contest	Did not contest	Did not contest	11	1
Warrumbungle	Did not contest	Did not contest	Did not contest	Did not contest	9	Did not contest
Waverley	3	6	2	Did not contest	1	0
Weddin	Did not contest	Did not contest	Did not contest	Did not contest	8	1
Wentworth	Did not contest	Did not contest	Did not contest	Did not contest	6	3
Willoughby	Did not contest	Did not contest	Did not contest	Did not contest	12	Did not contest
Wingecarribee	1	0	1	0	Did not contest	7
Wollondilly	Did not contest	0	Did not contest	Did not contest	8	Did not contest
Wollongong	7	Did not contest	3	Did not contest	2	Did not contest
Woollahra	Did not contest	9	1	Did not contest	Did not contest	5
Yass Valley	Did not contest	Did not contest	1	Did not contest	7	1

== See also ==
- Local government in Australia
- Local government areas of New South Wales
- Counties of New South Wales
