= Mulwaree Shire =

Former local government area in New South Wales, Australia

Mulwaree Shire New South Wales
- Established: 7 March 1906
- Abolished: 11 February 2004
- Council seat: Goulburn
- Region: Southern Tablelands

Mulwaree Shire was a local government area in the Southern Tablelands region of New South Wales, Australia.

Mulwaree Shire was proclaimed on 7 March 1906, one of 134 shires created after the passing of the Local Government (Shires) Act 1905.

The shire office was in Goulburn but the shire did not include Goulburn. Towns and villages in the shire included Bungonia, Marulan, Tarago and Taralga.

Mulwaree Shire was abolished and split on 11 February 2004 with part merged with the City of Goulburn to form Goulburn Mulwaree Council, part merged with Tallaganda Shire and parts of Yarrowlumla Shire and Gunning Shire to form Palerang Council and part merged with Crookwell Shire and parts of Gunning Shire and Yass Shire to form Upper Lachlan Shire.
