= Local Government Areas Amalgamation Act 1980 =

Act of the Parliament of New South Wales

Parliament of New South Wales
- Long title: An Act to amend the Local Government Act 1919 to unite certain areas, within the meaning of that Act, with other areas or parts thereof; and for other purposes
- Citation: Act No. 110, 1980
- Territorial extent: New South Wales
- Royal assent: 17 September 1980
- Commenced: 1 January 1981
- Administered by: Department of Local Government

Amends
- Local Government Act 1919

Repealed by
- Statute Law (Miscellaneous Provisions) Act 2011
- Status: Repealed

The Local Government Areas Amalgamation Act 1980 (NSW) was an Act of the Parliament of New South Wales, which amended the Local Government Act 1919, with the purpose of amalgamating a series of local government areas in New South Wales. The amalgamations took effect from 1 January 1981.

== The Act ==
Schedule 1 of the Act lists the areas to be amalgamated and the status of the new area (i.e. Shire or Municipality). The only area to be split by the Act was the Manning Shire, divided between the Shire of Great Lakes and the newly created Municipality of Greater Taree.

== Councils amalgamated ==
=== Municipalities ===
Constituent areas	United area
Municipality of Port Macquarie, Hastings Shire	Municipality of Port-Macquarie-Hastings
City of Wagga Wagga, Kyeamba Shire, Mitchell Shire	City of Wagga Wagga
Municipality of Taree, Municipality of Wingham, part of Manning Shire	Municipality of Greater Taree

=== Shires ===
Constituent areas	United area
Municipality of Bega, Mumbulla Shire, Imlay Shire	Bega Valley Shire
Municipality of Moree, Boomi Shire, Boolooroo Shire	Moree Plains Shire
Municipality of Narrabri, Namoi Shire	Narrabri Shire
Municipality of Quirindi, Tamarang Shire	Quirindi Shire
Municipality of Cowra, Waugoola Shire	Cowra Shire
Municipality of Forbes, Jemalong Shire	Forbes Shire
Municipality of Parkes, Goobang Shire	Parkes Shire
Municipality of Narromine, Timbregongie Shire	Narromine Shire
Municipality of Temora, Narraburra Shire	Temora Shire
Municipality of Junee, Illabo Shire	Junee Shire
Municipality of Cooma, Monaro Shire	Cooma-Monaro Shire
Municipality of Bowral, Mittagong Shire, Wingecarribee Shire	Wingecarribee Shire
Municipality of Windsor, Colo Shire	Hawkesbury Shire
Great Lakes Shire, part of Manning Shire	Great Lakes Shire

== Repeal ==
The Act was repealed by the Statute Law (Miscellaneous Provisions) Act 2011.

== See also ==
- List of local government areas in New South Wales
- List of former local government areas in New South Wales
