= Canobolas Shire =

Former local government area in New South Wales, Australia

Canobolas Shire New South Wales
- Established: 7 March 1906
- Abolished: 1 October 1977
- Council seat: Orange
- Region: Central West

Canobolas Shire was a local government area in the Central West region of New South Wales, Australia.

Canobolas Shire was proclaimed on 7 March 1906, one of 134 shires created after the passing of the Local Government (Shires) Act 1905.

The shire offices were based in Orange.

Urban areas in the shire included Lucknow and Spring Hill.

The shire was amalgamated with Boree Shire, Molong Shire and part of Lyndhurst Shire to form Cabonne Shire on 1 October 1977.
