= Amaroo =

Amaroo may refer to:

- In Australia:
  - Amaroo, Australian Capital Territory
  - Amaroo Shire, New South Wales
  - Amaroo, Queensland
  - Amaroo Park, a motorsport racetrack in Annangrove, New South Wales
