= Kerrs Creek, New South Wales =

Locality in New South Wales, Australia

Kerrs Creek
- Town
- Coordinates: 33°02′48.5″S 149°05′43.0″E
- Country: Australia
- State: New South Wales
- Region: Central West
- LGA: Cabonne Council
- Location: 291 km (181 mi) WNW of Sydney; 68 km (42 mi) S of Wellington; 33 km (21 mi) N of Orange

Government
  - State electorate: Orange
  - Federal division: Calare
- Elevation: 784 m (2,572 ft)

Population
  - Total: 58 (2021 census)
- Postcode: 2800
- County: Wellington
- Parish: Larras Lake, March, Warne
Localities around Kerrs Creek
Boomey	Euchareena	Euchareena
Molong	Kerrs Creek	Mullion Creek
Belgravia	Mullion Creek	Ophir

Kerrs Creek is a locality in the Central West region of New South Wales, Australia. There is a small settlement of the same name, within the locality. The locality was once associated with gold mining, but is now mainly agricultural. There is a watercourse, Kerrs Creek—a tributary of Bell River—that forms a part of the northern boundary of the locality.

The area now known as Kerrs Creek lies on the traditional lands of Wiradjuri people.

The first significant European settlement within the locality was by C. F. Warne, at Caleula, in 1838. It lay close to the road between Orange and Wellington, now Burrendong Way. By 1843, there was a steam flour mill at Caleula.

Gold mining was reported in the area in 1860. There was another rush in April 1886. In late 1892, a quartz reef mine in the area raised 100 tons of stone to be sent to England, seeking advice on how best to recover the gold from the ore. However, although there continued to be gold mining in the area, it seems never to have become a significant goldfield.

In 1892, 'pigment earths' suitable for use in paints—with colours, "Yellow chrome, brown, red, pink, purple, puce, and white"—were being mined and shipped by rail.

Marble was quarried in the area. It was used in the former CBC Bank building, 343 George Street, Sydney—on the Barrack St corner at Martin Place—and in Australia House, in London.

The Main Western railway line runs through the locality, and there was a railway station, known as Kerrs Creek, from 1882. A village arose near the railway station; both were located to the north of where Kerrs Creek—also known in earlier times as Larras Lake Creek—flows under the railway line. The village had a store, which was destroyed by fire in 1899.

The village—officially named Kerr—was proclaimed on 8 November 1890. It was better known as Kerrs Creek. A post office, known as Kerrs Creek, was established in 1889. There was a school there, known as Kerrs Creek, from 1883.

In 1926, the school mistress at Kerrs Creek, Miss Dorothy Lovatt, asked the Department of Education to transfer her, and was given a new posting at North Strathfield. She had found that a man, Morris Llewellyn Davies, whom she had understood to be single, was in fact a married man with children. Later, on 3 May 1926 at Maroubra, Davies shot her, but she survived. Davies was found guilty of attempted murder and was sentenced to seven years penal servitude.

Electricity at Kerrs Creek was first switch on for Christmas Day 1959.

The village of Kerr officially became Kerrs Creek only in 1977, and at the same time the watercourse lost its alternative name, Larras Lake Creek, becoming just Kerrs Creek. The name and boundaries of the locality were defined in March 2000.

The population consisted of railway and farm workers, and their families. During the 1950s and 1960s employment on farms and on the railways declined. The school closed in 1969, the railway station in 1975, and the post office in 1985. The former All Saints Anglican church's building was deconsecrated in 2019.

Kerrs Creek is the subject of a book, by Helen Hayes, Kerrs Creek, the village and district, which covers its history.

A significant portion of the locality is included within Mullions Range State Forest, with much of the remainder of the locality being cleared land used for agriculture. The remaining residents of the village mainly now work in the nearest large town, Orange.
