= Crookwell Shire =

Former local government area in New South Wales, Australia

Crookwell Shire New South Wales
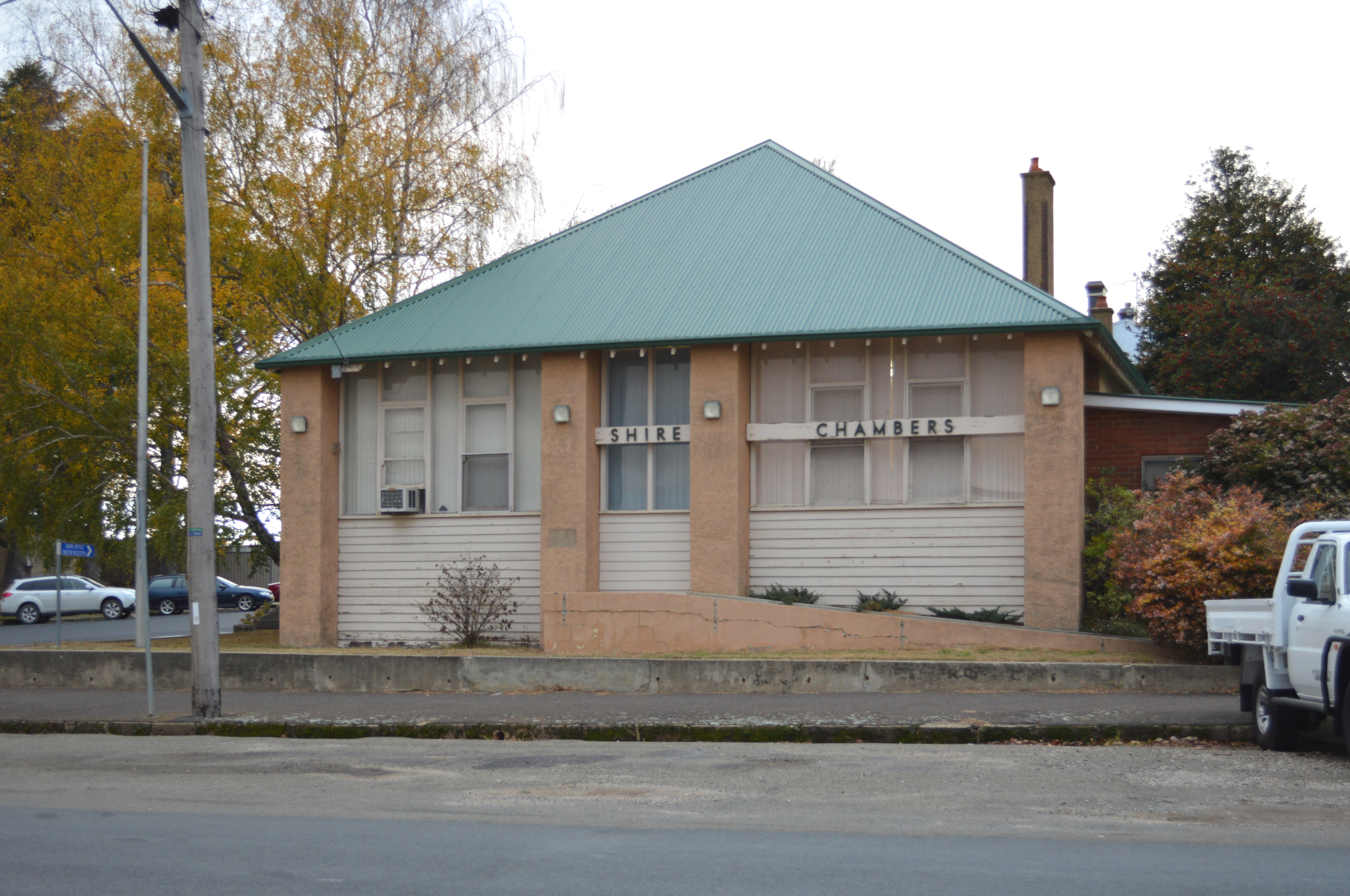
- Former shire chambers, 2013
- Established: 7 March 1906
- Abolished: 11 February 2004
- Council seat: Crookwell
- Region: Southern Tablelands

Crookwell Shire was a local government area in the Southern Tablelands region of New South Wales, Australia.

Crookwell Shire was proclaimed on 7 March 1906, one of 134 shires created after the passing of the Local Government (Shires) Act 1905.

The shire office was in Crookwell. Towns and villages in the shire included Bigga.

Crookwell Shire was amalgamated with parts of Gunning Shire, Mulwaree Shire and Yass Shire to form Upper Lachlan Shire on 11 February 2004.
