= Hume Shire =

Former local government area in New South Wales, Australia

Hume Shire New South Wales
- Established: 7 March 1906
- Abolished: 26 May 2004
- Council seat: Albury
- Region: Riverina

Hume Shire was a local government area in the eastern Riverina region of New South Wales, Australia.

Hume Shire was proclaimed on 7 March 1906, one of 134 shires created after the passing of the Local Government (Shires) Act 1905.

The shire offices were in Albury.

Other towns in the shire included Brocklesby, Burrumbuttock, Gerogery, Howlong and Jindera and the villages of Bowna, Bungowannah, Goombargana and Table Top.

Hume Shire was abolished and split on 26 May 2004 with part absorbed by City of Albury, part absorbed by Corowa Shire and the balance merged with Culcairn Shire and Holbrook Shire to form Greater Hume Shire.
