= Rylstone Shire =

Former local government area in New South Wales, Australia

Rylstone Shire New South Wales
- Established: 7 March 1906
- Abolished: 26 May 2004
- Council seat: Rylstone
- Region: Central West

Rylstone Shire was a local government area in the Central West region of New South Wales, Australia.

Rylstone Shire was proclaimed on 7 March 1906, one of 134 shires created after the passing of the Local Government (Shires) Act 1905.

The shire offices were based in Rylstone. Other urban areas in the shire included Kandos and Charbon.

Rylstone Shire was abolished and its area split on 26 May 2004 with part merged with parts of Coolah Shire, Mudgee Shire and Merriwa Shire to form Mid-Western Regional Council and the balance absorbed by the City of Lithgow.
