= Bannockburn Shire =

Former local government area in New South Wales, Australia

Bannockburn Shire New South Wales
- Established: 7 March 1906
- Abolished: 15 November 1940
- Council seat: Inverell
- Region: North West Slopes

Bannockburn Shire was a local government area in the North West Slopes region of New South Wales, Australia.

Bannockburn Shire was proclaimed on 7 March 1906, one of 134 shires created after the passing of the Local Government (Shires) Act 1905.

The shire offices were based in Inverell. Towns and villages in the shire included Delungra.

Bannockburn Shire was abolished and its area absorbed into Macintyre Shire on 15 November 1940.
