= Boree Shire =

Former local government area in New South Wales, Australia

Boree Shire New South Wales
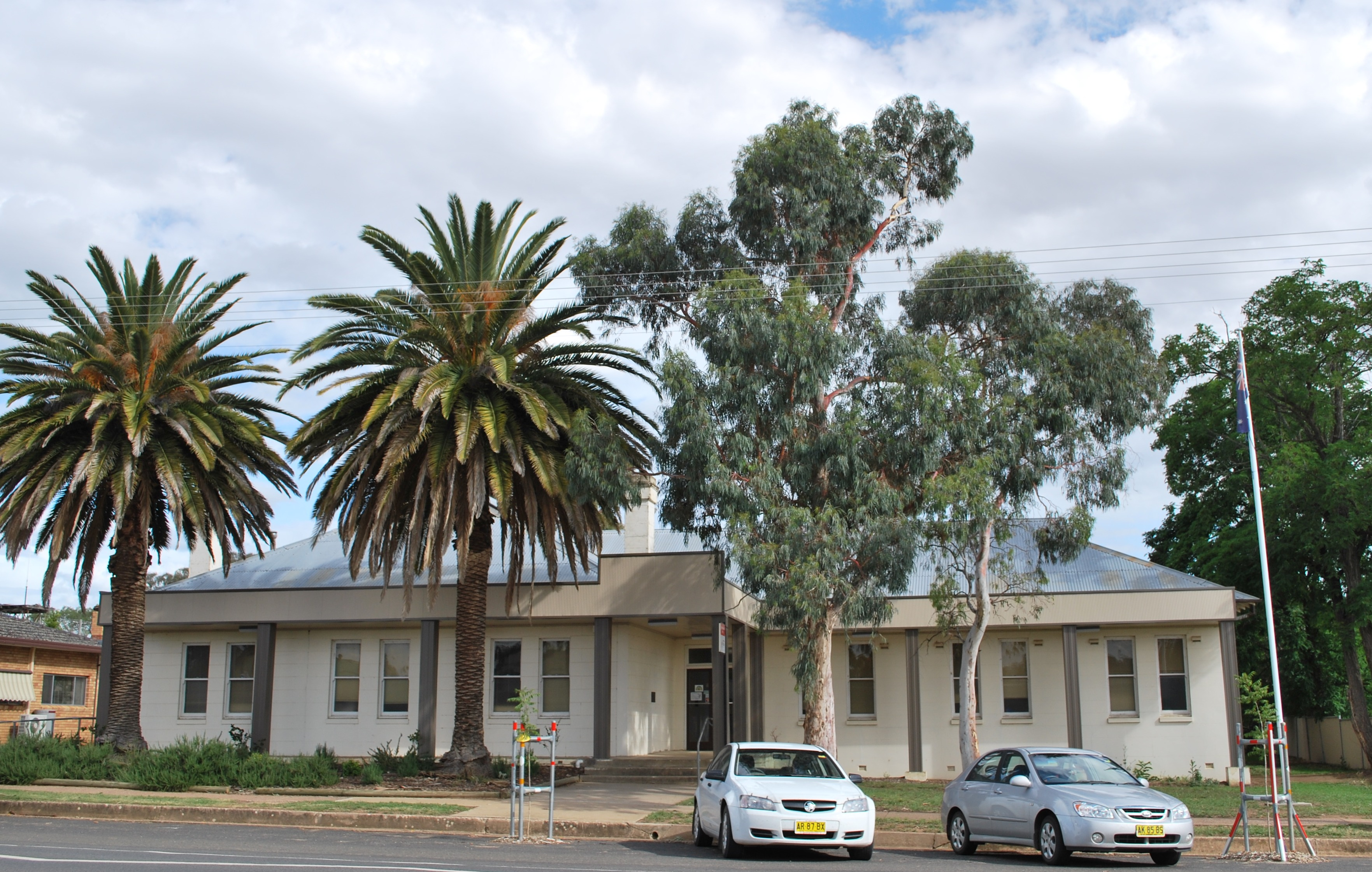
- Boree Shire chambers, 2010
- Established: 7 March 1906
- Abolished: 1 October 1977
- Council seat: Cudal
- Region: Central West

Boree Shire was a local government area in the Central West region of New South Wales, Australia.

Boree Shire was proclaimed on 7 March 1906, one of 134 shires created after the passing of the Local Government (Shires) Act 1905. It absorbed the Municipality of Cudal on 24 December 1912.

The shire offices were based in Cudal. Urban areas in the shire included Cudal, Canowindra, Eugowra and Manildra and the village of Toogong.

The shire was amalgamated with Canobolas Shire, Molong Shire and part of Lyndhurst Shire to form Cabonne Shire on 1 October 1977.
