= Abercrombie Shire =

Former local government area in New South Wales, Australia

Abercrombie Shire New South Wales
- Established: 7 March 1906
- Abolished: 1 October 1977
- Council seat: Perthville
- Region: Central West

Abercrombie Shire was a local government area in the Central West region of New South Wales, Australia.

Abercrombie Shire was proclaimed on 7 March 1906, one of 134 shires created after the passing of the Local Government (Shires) Act 1905.

The shire offices were originally in Rockley and later moved to Perthville.

Abercrombie Shire was abolished on 1 October 1977 and along with the City of Bathurst and Turon Shire was divided into a reconstituted City of Bathurst and a new Evans Shire
