= Culcairn Shire =

Former local government area in New South Wales, Australia

Culcairn Shire New South Wales
- Established: 7 March 1906
- Abolished: 26 May 2004
- Council seat: Culcairn
- Region: Riverina

Culcairn Shire was a local government area in the eastern Riverina region of New South Wales, Australia.

Culcairn Shire was proclaimed on 7 March 1906, one of 134 shires created after the passing of the Local Government (Shires) Act 1905.

The shire offices were in Culcairn. Other towns in the shire included Henty and Walla Walla and the villages of Alma Park, Bulgandry, Cookardinia, Morven and Walbundrie.

Culcairn Shire was amalgamated with Holbrook Shire and part of Hume Shire to form Greater Hume Shire on 26 May 2004.
