= Tarro Shire =

Former local government area in New South Wales, Australia

Tarro Shire New South Wales
- Established: 7 March 1906
- Abolished: 6 June 1944
- Council seat: East Maitland
- Region: Hunter

Tarro Shire was a local government area in the Hunter region of New South Wales, Australia.

Tarro Shire was proclaimed (as Kurri Kurri Shire) on 7 March 1906, one of 134 shires created after the passing of the Local Government (Shires) Act 1905. It was renamed Tarro Shire on 8 January 1907.

The shire office was in East Maitland. Other towns and villages in the shire included Hexham, Mulbring, Tarro and Sandgate.

On 2 April 1938, the Greater Newcastle Act 1937 saw part of Tarro Shire was excised and merged with part of Lake Macquarie Shire and 10 suburban municipalities to form the City of Greater Newcastle.

Tarro Shire amalgamated with Bolwarra Shire and part of Kearsley Shire on 6 June 1944 to form Lower Hunter Shire.
