= Coonabarabran Shire =

Former local government area in New South Wales, Australia

- Local government area
- Country: Australia
- State: New South Wales
- Region: Orana
- Established: 7 March 1906
- Abolished: 25 August 2004
- Council seat: Council Chambers
- County: Pottinger, Gowen, Baradine, Napier

The Coonabarabran Shire was a local government area in the Orana region of New South Wales, Australia. The Shire was proclaimed on 7 March 1906 with the enactment of the Local Government (Shires) Act 1905 and was centred on the town of Coonabarabran, but also covered a wide area extending to smaller towns, such as Baradine and Binnaway. On 25 August 2004, the Shire voluntarily amalgamated with the adjoining Coolah Shire to form the Warrumbungle Shire.

== Council history ==
Proclaimed on 7 March 1906 with the enactment of the Local Government (Shires) Act 1905, the first temporary Coonabarabran Shire Council of five councillors was appointed on 15 May 1906 until elections were held:

Councillor	Notes
Alfred Brown	Bomera, Tambar Springs
Thomas Deans	Maderty, Coonabarabran
Frederick George Failes	Coonabarabran
William Nash	Lynburn, Bugaldi
John James Treasure	Baradine

The first meeting of the temporary Council was held at the Court House on 14 May 1906, with Alfred Brown elected the first Shire President. The first elections were held on 24 November 1906 for six Councillors elected to three two-member ridings (A, B, C), with William Nash being the only returning Councillor.

Although first incorporated in 1906, much of the growth and development in the Shire was due to two First World War-era State Government projects: the construction of the railway line through Binnaway to Coonabarabran in 1917 (extended to Baradine and Gwabegar in 1923) and the establishment of the Forestry Commission in 1916, both of which facilitated the growth of agriculture and forestry as the primary industries of the region.

As electricity generation and supply was the responsibility of local councils before 1950, in 1929 the Coonabarabran Shire Council voted to purchase land at 15 Castlereagh Street for a power station with diesel generators and supply infrastructure for the town of Coonabarabran. Power was supplied to the town by 1930, with the network extended to Baradine and Binnaway by 1937, and ever-increasing demand led to the purchase of another power plant in 1938. In September 1942, the 1929 Power Station at Coonabarabran was destroyed by fire caused by a faulty switch.

However, even though the Power Station was rebuilt by 1943, increasing demand and concerns over the reliability of supply led Council in 1948 to investigate the creation of a County Council to facilitate an expansion of supply and lowering of costs. As a result, the Ulan County Council was proclaimed on 23 July 1948, covering the area of the Coonabarabran Shire, the Municipality of Mudgee, Coolah Shire, Cudgegong Shire, Gulgong Shire, "A" Riding of Cobbora Shire, and the "C" Riding of Merriwa Shire. With the establishment of the County Council on 1 January 1949, all of Coonabarabran's electricity generation and supply assets were transferred over, with the County Council continuing the expansion of supply to the rest of the Shire.

== Shire Presidents/Mayors ==
Term	Name	Notes
14 May 1906 – 24 November 1906	Alfred Brown	
December 1906 – February 1908	David Innes Watt	
February 1908 – February 1911	Dr Frederick George Failes	
February 1911 – February 1913	David Innes Watt	
February 1913 – February 1914	Claude W. L. Murchison	
February 1914 – 1 March 1915	Thomas J. C. Hutchinson	
1 March 1915 – 4 February 1916	Alfred H. Pope	
4 February 1916 – February 1917	E. J. Douglas	
February 1917 – February 1918	Alexander Deans	
February 1918 – December 1920	James Bede Brennan	
December 1920 – December 1921	E. J. Douglas	
December 1921 – December 1922	James Bede Brennan	
December 1922 – December 1923	E. J. Douglas	
December 1923 – December 1924	Thomas John Wark	
December 1924 – December 1927	William Thomas Neilson	
December 1927 – December 1929	Albert James Sullivan (ALP)	
December 1929 – December 1930	William Thomas Neilson	
December 1930 – December 1931	David Hagan	
December 1931 – December 1932	Albert James Sullivan (ALP)	
December 1932 – December 1934	William Thomas Neilson	
December 1934 – December 1935	Albert James Sullivan (ALP)	
December 1935 – December 1937	William Thomas Neilson	
December 1937 – December 1938	Albert James Sullivan (ALP)	
December 1938 – 14 December 1939	William Thomas Neilson	
14 December 1939 – 15 May 1941	Jack Renshaw (ALP)	
May 1941 – December 1941	S. H. Regan	

== See also ==
- Roger Wotton – Member of Parliament (1968–1991), Councillor (1963–1968) and Deputy Shire President (1965).
