= Bolwarra Shire =

Former local government area in New South Wales, Australia

Bolwarra Shire New South Wales
- Established: 7 March 1906
- Abolished: 6 July 1944
- Council seat: North Maitland
- Region: Hunter

Bolwarra Shire was a local government area in the Hunter region of New South Wales, Australia.

Bolwarra Shire was proclaimed on 7 March 1906, one of 134 shires created after the passing of the Local Government (Shires) Act 1905.

The shire offices were originally based in Largs. They later moved to Lorn and again to North Maitland. Other urban areas in the shire included Paterson and Vacy.

The shire was amalgamated with Tarro Shire and part of Kearsley Shire to form Lower Hunter Shire on 6 July 1944.
