= Holbrook Shire =

Former local government area in New South Wales, Australia

Holbrook Shire New South Wales
- Established: 7 March 1906
- Abolished: 26 May 2004
- Council seat: Holbrook
- Region: Riverina

Holbrook Shire was a local government area in the eastern Riverina region of New South Wales, Australia.

Holbrook Shire was proclaimed on 7 March 1906 as Germanton Shire, one of 134 shires created after the passing of the Local Government (Shires) Act 1905. The shire was renamed Holbrook Shire on 6 August 1915. The renaming was a demonstration of patriotism during World War I and the name was taken in honour of Norman Douglas Holbrook, a British submarine captain awarded the Victoria Cross earlier in the war.

The shire offices were in Holbrook.

Holbrook Shire was amalgamated with Culcairn Shire and part of Hume Shire to form Greater Hume Shire on 26 May 2004.
