= Ashford Shire =

Former local government area in New South Wales, Australia

Ashford Shire New South Wales
- Established: 7 March 1906
- Abolished: 1 July 1979
- Council seat: Ashford
- Region: North West Slopes

Ashford Shire was a local government area in the North West Slopes region of New South Wales, Australia.

Ashford Shire was proclaimed on 7 March 1906, one of 134 shires created after the passing of the Local Government (Shires) Act 1905.

The shire offices were based in Ashford. Other towns and villages in the shire included Bonshaw, Bukkulla, Wallangra and Yetman.

The Shire was amalgamated with the Municipality of Inverell and Macintyre Shire to form Inverell Shire on 1 July 1979.
