= Mitchell Shire (New South Wales) =

Former local government area in New South Wales, Australia

Mitchell Shire New South Wales
- Established: 7 March 1906
- Abolished: 1 January 1981
- Council seat: Wagga Wagga
- Region: Riverina

Mitchell Shire was a local government area in the Riverina region of New South Wales, Australia.

Mitchell Shire was proclaimed on 7 March 1906, one of 134 shires created after the passing of the Local Government (Shires) Act 1905.

The shire office was in Wagga Wagga. Towns and villages in the shire include Currawarna, Collingullie and Uranquinty.

Mitchell Shire was abolished on 1 January 1981 and, along with Kyeamba Shire, its area was absorbed into the City of Wagga Wagga per the Local Government Areas Amalgamation Act 1980.
