= Terania Shire =

Former local government area in New South Wales, Australia

Terania Shire New South Wales
- Established: 7 March 1906
- Abolished: 1 January 1977
- Council seat: Lismore
- Region: Northern Rivers

Terania Shire was a local government area in the Northern Rivers region of New South Wales, Australia.

Terania Shire was proclaimed on 7 March 1906, one of 134 shires created after the passing of the Local Government (Shires) Act 1905. Walter Massy-Greene was elected as the inaugural shire president.

The shire offices were in Lismore. Other towns and villages in the shire included Nimbin.

Terania Shire was abolished and split on 1 January 1977 with part of its area absorbed by Kyogle Shire and the balance merged along with Gundurimba Shire into the City of Lismore.
