= Mittagong Shire =

Former local government area in New South Wales, Australia

Colo Shire New South Wales
- Established: 7 March 1906
- Abolished: 1 January 1981
- Council seat: Mittagong
- Region: Southern Highlands

Mittagong Shire was a local government area in the Southern Highlands region of New South Wales, Australia.

Mittagong Shire was proclaimed (as Nattai Shire) on 7 March 1906, one of 134 shires created after the passing of the Local Government (Shires) Act 1905. The shire absorbed the Municipality of Mittagong on 1 January 1939. It was renamed Mittagong Shire in 1949.

The shire offices were in Mittagong. Other towns in the shire included Hill Top, Colo Vale, Yerrinbool, Aylmerton, Willow Vale and Balaclava.

In 1961 the population of Mittagong Shire was 5875.

Mittagong Shire along with the Municipality of Bowral was absorbed into Wingecarribee Shire on 1 January 1981 per the Local Government Areas Amalgamation Act 1980
