= Hastings Shire =

Former local government area in New South Wales, Australia

Hastings Shire New South Wales
- Established: 7 March 1906
- Abolished: 1 January 1981
- Council seat: Port Macquarie
- Region: Mid North Coast

Hastings Shire was a local government area in the Mid North Coast region of New South Wales, Australia.

Hastings Shire was proclaimed on 7 March 1906, one of 134 shires created after the passing of the Local Government (Shires) Act 1905.

The shire offices were originally in Wauchope but by 1975 had moved to Port Macquarie. Other towns in the shire included Camden Haven, Comboyne, Ellenborough, Kendall and Laurieton.

Hastings Shire was amalgamated with the Municipality of Port Macquarie to form Municipality of Hastings on 1 January 1981 per the Local Government Areas Amalgamation Act 1980.
