= Lyndhurst Shire =

Former local government area in New South Wales, Australia

Lyndhurst Shire New South Wales
- Established: 7 March 1906
- Abolished: 1 October 1977
- Council seat: Blayney
- Region: Central West

Lyndhurst Shire was a local government area in the Central West region of New South Wales, Australia.

Lyndhurst Shire was proclaimed on 7 March 1906, one of 134 shires created after the passing of the Local Government (Shires) Act 1905. The shire absorbed the Municipality of Blayney and the Municipality of Carcoar on 12 November 1935.

The shire offices were based in Blayney.

Urban areas in the shire included Blayney, Carcoar, South Carcoar, Mandurama and Millthorpe and the villages of Barry, Lyndhurst, Neville and Newbridge.

The shire was abolished on 1 October 1977 with part amalgamated with Boree Shire and Molong Shire to form Cabonne Shire and the balance reconstituted as Blayney Shire.
