= Colo Shire =

Former local government area in New South Wales, Australia

Colo Shire New South Wales
- Established: 7 March 1906
- Abolished: 1 January 1981
- Council seat: Wilberforce
- Region: Sydney Basin

Colo Shire was a local government area in the Sydney Basin region of New South Wales, Australia.

Colo Shire was proclaimed on 7 March 1906, one of 134 shires created after the passing of the Local Government (Shires) Act 1905.

The shire offices were in Wilberforce. Other towns in the shire included North Richmond, Sackville, Glossodia, Kurrajong, St Albans and Ebenezer.

In 1961 the population of Colo Shire was 5452.

Colo Shire was amalgamated with the Municipality of Windsor to form Hawkesbury Shire on 1 January 1981 per the Local Government Areas Amalgamation Act 1980.
