= Gundurimba Shire =

Former local government area in New South Wales, Australia

Gundurimba Shire New South Wales
- Established: 7 March 1906
- Abolished: 1 January 1977
- Council seat: Lismore
- Region: Northern Rivers

Gundurimba Shire was a local government area in the Northern Rivers region of New South Wales, Australia.

Gundurimba Shire was proclaimed on 7 March 1906, one of 134 shires created after the passing of the Local Government (Shires) Act 1905.

The shire offices were in Lismore.

Gundurimba Shire was abolished on 1 January 1977 and its area merged along with part of Terania Shire into the City of Lismore.
