= Turon Shire =

Former local government area in New South Wales, Australia

Turon Shire New South Wales
- Established: 7 March 1906
- Abolished: 1 October 1977
- Council seat: Kelso
- Region: Central West

Turon Shire was a local government area in the Central West region of New South Wales, Australia.

Turon Shire was proclaimed on 7 March 1906, one of 134 shires created after the passing of the Local Government (Shires) Act 1905. The shire absorbed the Municipality of Hill End on 17 June 1908.

The shire offices were in Kelso. Other towns and villages in the shire included Hill End, Raglan, Sofala, Sunny Corner and Wattle Flat.

Turon Shire was abolished on 1 October 1977 and along with the City of Bathurst and Abercrombie Shire was divided into a reconstituted City of Bathurst and a new Evans Shire.
