= Macintyre Shire =

Former local government area in New South Wales, Australia

Macintyre Shire New South Wales
- Established: 7 March 1906
- Abolished: 1 July 1979
- Council seat: Inverell
- Region: North West Slopes

Macintyre Shire was a local government area in the North West Slopes region of New South Wales, Australia.

Macintyre Shire was proclaimed on 7 March 1906, one of 134 shires created after the passing of the Local Government (Shires) Act 1905. On 15 November 1940, the shire absorbed the neighbouring Bannockburn Shire.

The shire offices were based in Inverell. Other towns and villages in the shire included Delungra, Gilgai, Stannifer and Wandera.

The Shire was amalgamated with the Municipality of Inverell and Ashford Shire to form Inverell Shire on 1 July 1979.
