= Blaxland Shire =

Former local government area in New South Wales, Australia

- Local government area
- Country: Australia
- State: New South Wales
- Region: Central West
- Established: 7 March 1906
- Abolished: 1 April 1977
- Council seat: Wallerawang

Blaxland Shire was a local government area in the Central West region of New South Wales, Australia.

== History ==
Blaxland Shire was proclaimed on 7 March 1906, one of 134 shires created after the passing of the Local Government (Shires) Act 1905.

The shire offices were based in Wallerawang. Other urban areas in the shire included Bowenfels, Capertee, Cullen Bullen, Hampton, Hartley, Portland and Tarana.

The shire was abolished and its area absorbed into the City of Lithgow on 1 April 1977.
