= Quirindi Shire =

Former local government area in New South Wales, Australia

- Local government area
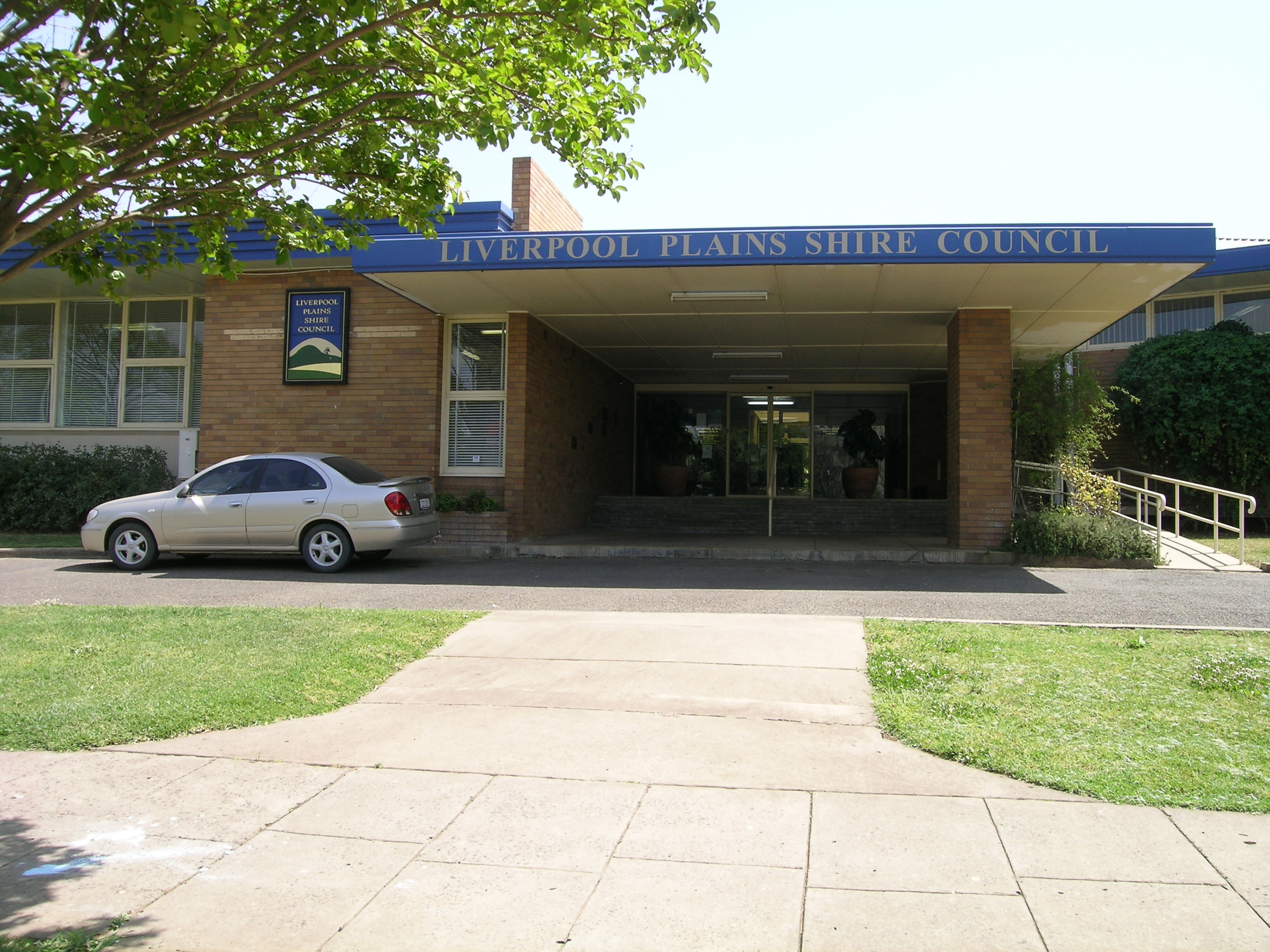
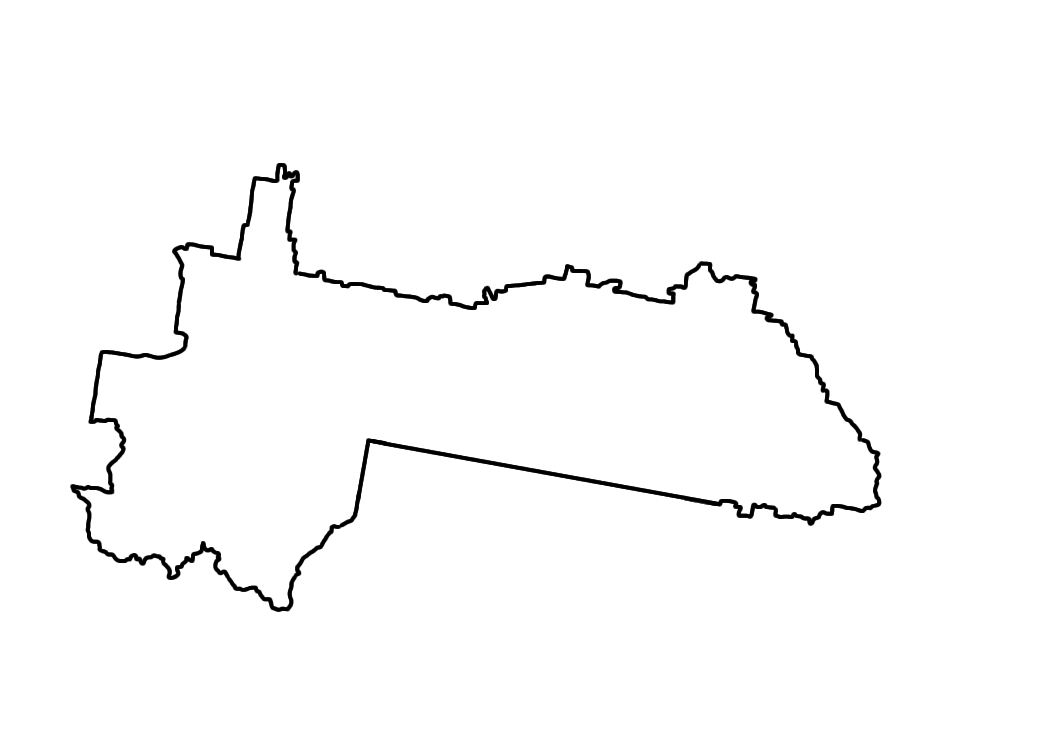
- Former Quirindi Shire offices, 2009. Borders of Quirindi Shire
- Country: Australia
- State: New South Wales
- Region: North West Slopes
- Established: 1 January 1980
- Abolished: 17 March 2004
- Council seat: Quirindi

Quirindi Shire was a local government area in the New England region of New South Wales, Australia.

Quirindi Shire was proclaimed on 1 January 1980, created from the amalgamation of Tamarang Shire and the Municipality of Quirindi as a result of the Local Government Areas Amalgamation Act 1980.

The shire offices were based in Quirindi. Other localities in the Shire included Blackville, Caroona, Colly Blue, Premer and Spring Ridge.

Quirindi Shire amalgamated with parts of Murrurundi Shire, Parry Shire and Gunnedah Shires to form Liverpool Plains Shire on 17 March 2004.
