= Kyeamba Shire =

Former local government area in New South Wales, Australia

Kyeamba Shire New South Wales
- Population: 4,841 (1961)
- Established: 7 March 1906
- Abolished: 1 January 1981
- Council seat: Wagga Wagga
- Region: Riverina

Kyeamba Shire was a local government area in the Riverina region of New South Wales, Australia.

Kyeamba Shire was proclaimed on 7 March 1906, one of 134 shires created after the passing of the Local Government (Shires) Act 1905.

The shire offices were in Wagga Wagga. Other towns and villages in the shire included Book Book, Borambola, Gumly Gumly, Forest Hill, Humula, Ladysmith, Lake Albert, Pulletop, Mangoplah and Tarcutta.

In 1961 the population of Kyeamba Shire was 4841.

Kyeamba Shire was abolished on 1 January 1981 and, along with Mitchell Shire, its area was absorbed into the City of Wagga Wagga per the Local Government Areas Amalgamation Act 1980.
