= Manning Shire =

Former local government area in New South Wales, Australia

Manning Shire New South Wales
- Established: 7 March 1906
- Abolished: 1 January 1981
- Council seat: Taree
- Region: Mid North Coast

Manning Shire was a local government area in the Mid North Coast region of New South Wales, Australia.

Manning Shire was proclaimed on 7 March 1906, one of 134 shires created after the passing of the Local Government (Shires) Act 1905.

The shire offices were in Taree. Other towns in the shire included Diamond Beach, Old Bar, Lansdowne and Nabiac.

In 1961 the population of Manning Shire was 11721.

Manning Shire was abolished on 1 January 1981 per the Local Government Areas Amalgamation Act 1980 with part merged with the Municipality of Taree and the Municipality of Wingham to form City of Greater Taree and the balance absorbed by Great Lakes Shire.
