= Mullion Creek, New South Wales =

Mullion Creek
- Town
- Coordinates: 33°07′33″S 149°07′37″E
- Country: Australia
- State: New South Wales
- LGA: Cabonne Council

Population
  - Total: 561 (SAL 2021)

Mullion Creek is a locality in the central west of New South Wales, Australia, in Cabonne Shire, near Orange.

It is a quiet town with a school, hall and church. The church is going through debate about a cemetery next to the Roman Catholic church. It is also quite famous for sightings of large orange cats that many people have thought to be cougars, which have been accused of killing local livestock.

== School ==
- Mullion Creek Public School

== Church ==
- St Brendan's Catholic Church
