= Namoi Shire =

Former local government area in New South Wales, Australia

Namoi Shire New South Wales
- Established: 7 March 1906
- Abolished: 1 January 1981
- Council seat: Narrabri
- Region: North West Slopes

Namoi Shire was a local government area in the North West Slopes region of New South Wales, Australia.

Namoi Shire was proclaimed on 7 March 1906. Its offices were based in the town of Narrabri.

In 1937, Namoi Shire absorbed the Municipality of West Narrabri.

The Local Government Areas Amalgamation Act 1980 saw the amalgamation of Namoi Shire with the Municipality of Narrabri to form Narrabri Shire on 1 January 1981.
