= Coolah Shire =

Former local government area in New South Wales, Australia

Coolah Shire was a local government area in New South Wales, Australia from 1906 to 1994.

It was established under the Local Government (Shires) Act 1905 with effect from 7 March 1906.

The shire offices were based in the small town of Coolah. The shire also included the towns of Dunedoo, Mendooran and Leadville, as well as the smaller settlements of Cobbora, Merrygoen, Neilrex and Uarbry.

It absorbed part of the abolished Gulgong Shire on 1 January 1957.

It amalgamated with the adjoining Coonabarabran Shire to form Warrumbungle Shire on 25 August 2004.
