= Illabo Shire =

Former local government area in New South Wales, Australia

Illabo Shire New South Wales
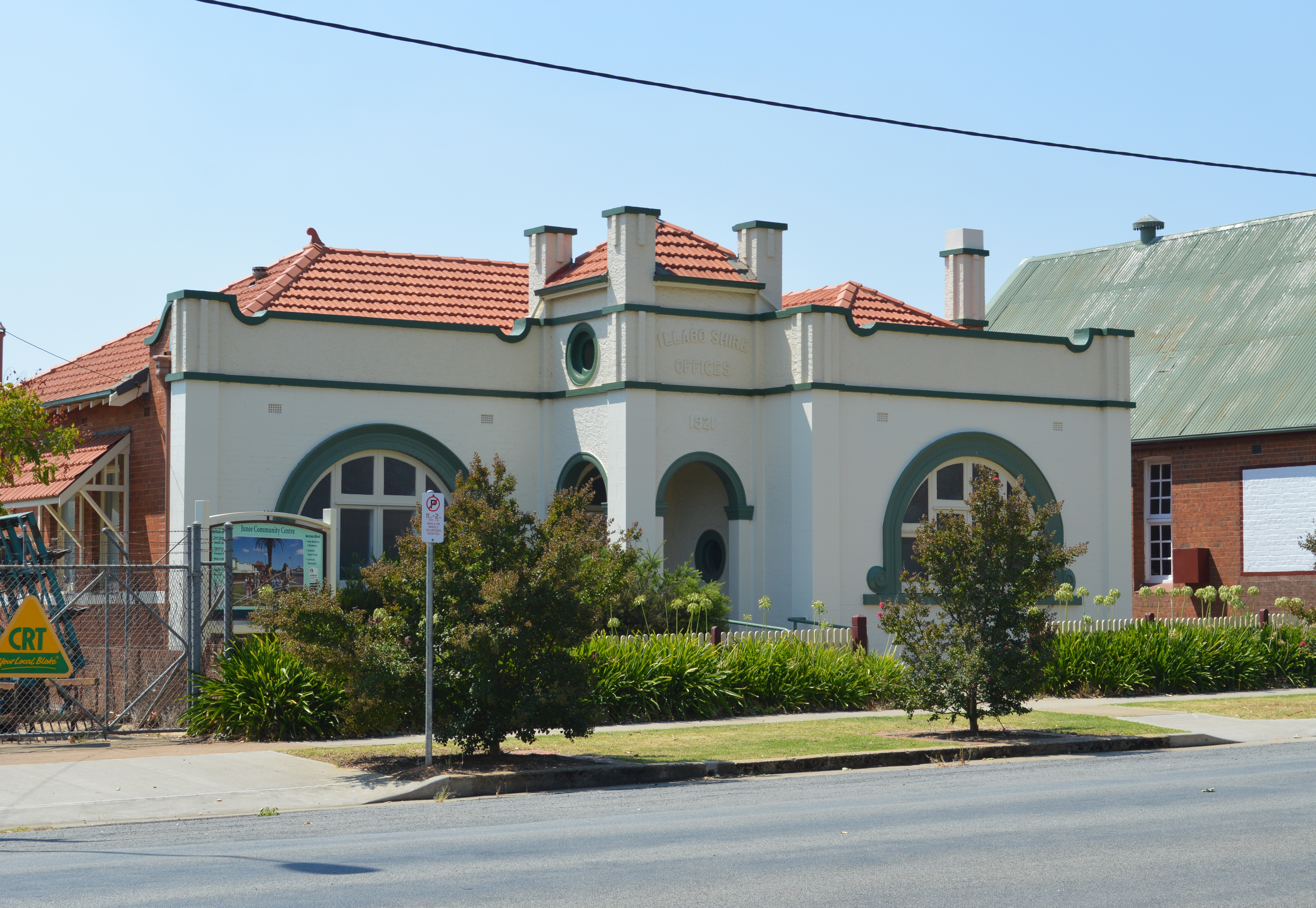
- The Illabo Shire Council chambers in Junee, built in 1921
- Established: 7 March 1906
- Abolished: 1 January 1981
- Council seat: Junee
- Region: Riverina

Illabo Shire was a local government area in the Riverina region of New South Wales, Australia.

Illabo Shire was proclaimed on 7 March 1906. Its offices were based in the town of Junee.

The Local Government Areas Amalgamation Act 1980 saw the amalgamation of Illabo Shire with the Municipality of Junee to form Junee Shire on 1 January 1981.
