= Monaro Shire =

Former local government area in New South Wales, Australia

Monaro Shire New South Wales
- Established: 7 March 1906
- Abolished: 1 January 1981
- Council seat: Cooma
- Region: Monaro

Monaro Shire was a local government area in the Monaro region of New South Wales, Australia. Monaro Shire was proclaimed on 7 March 1906.

The Shire contained the villages of Bredbo and Nimmitabel.

The Local Government Areas Amalgamation Act 1980 saw the amalgamation of Monaro Shire with the Municipality of Cooma to form Cooma-Monaro Shire on 1 January 1981.
