= Waugoola Shire =

Former local government area in New South Wales, Australia

- Local government area
- Country: Australia
- State: New South Wales
- Region: South West Slopes
- Established: 7 March 1906
- Abolished: 1 January 1981
- Council seat: Cowra

Waugoola Shire was a local government area in the South West Slopes region of New South Wales, Australia. Waugoola Shire was established on 7 March 1906.

The Shire was merged with the Municipality of Cowra to form Cowra Shire on 1 January 1981 per the Local Government Areas Amalgamation Act 1980.
