= Timbrebongie Shire =

Former local government area in New South Wales, Australia

Timbrebongie Shire New South Wales
- Established: 7 March 1906
- Abolished: 1 January 1981
- Council seat: Narromine
- Region: Orana

Timbrebongie Shire was a local government area in the Orana region of New South Wales, Australia.

Timbrebongie Shire was proclaimed on 7 March 1906, with offices based in the town of Narromine.

The Local Government Areas Amalgamation Act 1980 saw the amalgamation of Timbrebongie Shire with the Municipality of Narromine to form Narromine Shire on 1 January 1981.
