= Evans Shire =

Former local government area in New South Wales, Australia

Coordinates: 33°25′00.00″S 149°34′00.00″E

- Local government area
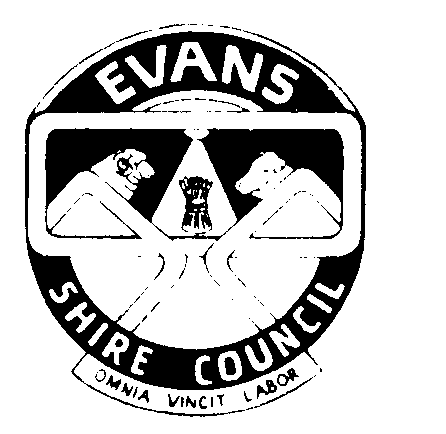
- Country: Australia
- State: New South Wales
- Region: Central West
- Established: 1 October 1977
- Abolished: 26 May 2004

Evans Shire was a local government area which encircled the City of Bathurst in New South Wales, Australia. It was established on 1 October 1977 after the City of Bathurst, Abercrombie Shire and Turon Shire were divided between Bathurst City and Evans Shire. It was dissolved on 26 May 2004.

The shire, when proclaimed was 4277.57 square kilometres and grew slightly to 4284 square kilometres prior to its dissolution. It included the towns of Hill End, Sofala, Sunny Corner, Rockley, Burraga and Trunkey Creek.

== Dissolution and amalgamation ==
Evans Shire Council was placed on the Department of Local Government's financial monitoring watch list in 2002-2003 following concerns that it had become highly reliant on grants and contributions from the state and federal governments. A proposal was put forward by the NSW Local Government Boundaries Commission to amalgamate Evans Shire and the City of Bathurst, with some boundary changes affecting both the proposed LGA and the Oberon Shire area in April 2004.

Evans Shire was dissolved on 26 May 2004, with most of the shire becoming part of the new Bathurst Regional Council. Around 15% of the southeastern portion of the shire (including Mount David and Burraga) became part of the Oberon Shire, with a small parcel of land east of Tarana being allocated to the City of Lithgow.
