= Colly Blue =

Colly Blue New South Wales
- Coordinates: 31°27′19″S 150°08′35″E
- Population: 22 (SAL 2021)
- Postcode(s): 2343
- Location: 409 km (254 mi) NNW of Sydney; 99 km (62 mi) S of Tamworth; 60 km (37 mi) W of Quirindi
- LGA(s): Liverpool Plains Shire
- State electorate(s): Upper Hunter
- Federal division(s): New England

Colly Blue is a locality in the North West Slopes region of New South Wales, Australia. The locality is in the Liverpool Plains Shire, 409 kilometres (254 mi) north west of the state capital, Sydney and 60 kilometres (37 mi) west of Quirindi.

At the 2021 census, Colly Blue had a population of 22.
