= Bungowannah =

- Town
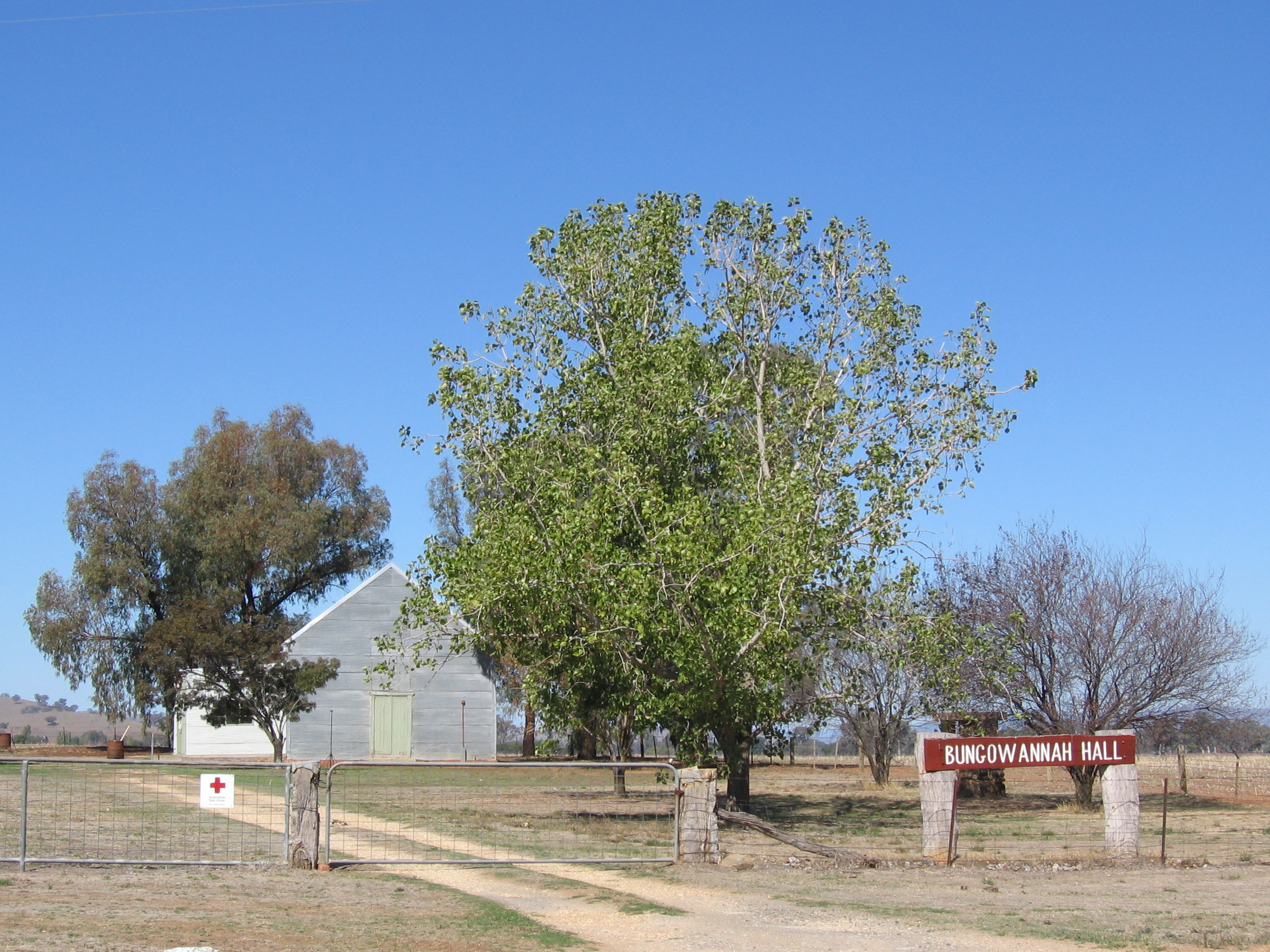
- Community Hall

- Coordinates: 36°01′S 146°46′E
- Country: Australia
- State: New South Wales
- Region: Riverina
- LGA: Greater Hume Shire
- Location: 575 km (357 mi) SW of Sydney; 18 km (11 mi) NW of Albury; 34 km (21 mi) SW of Jindera; 8 km (5.0 mi) SE of Howlong

Government
  - State electorate: Albury
  - Federal division: Farrer

Population
  - Total: 175 (SAL 2021)
- Postcode: 2640
- County: Hume

Bungowannah is a locality in the Riverina region of New South Wales, Australia. The locality is on the Riverina Highway, about 16 kilometres (9.9 mi) north west of Albury and 8 kilometres (5.0 mi) south east of Howlong.

Bungowannah Post Office opened on 1 December 1867, was closed between 1906 and 1918, and finally closed in 1951.

== Climate ==
Climate data for Bungowannah (Lat: 36.02° S Lon: 146.76° E) (precipitation normals 1961-1990)
| Month | Jan | Feb | Mar | Apr | May | Jun | Jul | Aug | Sep | Oct | Nov | Dec | Year |
|---|---|---|---|---|---|---|---|---|---|---|---|---|---|
| Average precipitation mm (inches) | 38.8 (1.53) | 29.1 (1.15) | 32.5 (1.28) | 43.9 (1.73) | 58.7 (2.31) | 44.6 (1.76) | 64.9 (2.56) | 65.2 (2.57) | 52.6 (2.07) | 57.0 (2.24) | 40.6 (1.60) | 40.0 (1.57) | 567.9 (22.37) |
Source: Bureau of Meteorology
