= Snowy River Shire =

Former local government area in New South Wales, Australia

- Local government area
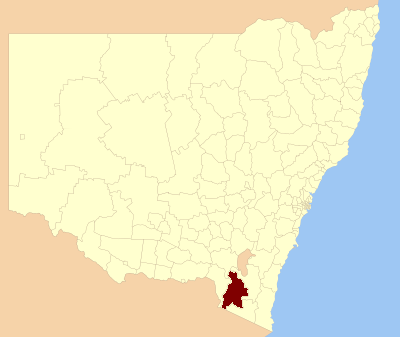
- Location in New South Wales
- Coordinates: 36°22′S 148°49′E
- Country: Australia
- State: New South Wales
- Region: Monaro
- Established: 1906 (as Dalgety Shire)
- Abolished: 12 May 2016
- Council seat: Berridale and Jindabyne

Government
  - Mayor: John Cahill (Independent)
  - State electorate: Monaro
  - Federal division: Eden-Monaro

Area
  - Total: 6,030 km^{2} (2,330 sq mi)

Population
  - Total: 8,087 (2013 est)
  - Density: 1.3411/km^{2} (3.4735/sq mi)
- Website: Snowy River Shire
LGAs around Snowy River Shire
Tumut	Australian Capital Territory	Cooma-Monaro
Tumbarumba	Snowy River Shire	Cooma-Monaro
East Gippsland (Vic)	East Gippsland (Vic)	Bombala

The Snowy River Shire was a local government area in the Australian Alps region of New South Wales, Australia from 1939 until May 2016. It was named after the Snowy River that runs through it. Prior to 1936, it had been named as Dalgety Shire since establishment in 1906.

== History ==
The Dalgety Shire Council changed its name to Snowy River Shire in 1939. The council seat was at Berridale, which caused delays when mail and deliveries were erroneously sent to Dalgety. Dalgety was one of several new shires established in June 1906.

A 2015 review of local government boundaries recommended that the Snowy River Shire merge with the Bombala and Cooma-Monaro shires to form a new council with an area of 15,162 square kilometres (5,854 sq mi) and support a population of approximately 21,000. On 12 May 2016, the Snowy River Shire merged with Bombala and Cooma-Monaro shires to form the Snowy Monaro Regional Council.

The last mayor of the Snowy River Shire was John Cahill, an independent politician.

== Towns and localities ==
The administrative centre of the former Shire was the town of Berridale, with the sub-alpine town of Jindabyne providing the main commercial centre for the southern Snowy Mountains resort area. The town of Adaminaby is the service centre for the northern snowfields resorts and the starting point for most trout fishers eager to test their skills in the rivers and streams or the enormous expanse of Lake Eucumbene. It also includes the village of Dalgety, Anglers Reach, the ghost town of Kiandra, and the ski resorts of Thredbo, Perisher, Smiggin Holes, Guthega and Blue Cow.

== Council ==
=== Final composition and election method ===
Prior to its abolition, Snowy River Shire Council was composed of seven councillors, including the mayor, elected for fixed four-year terms of office. The mayor was directly elected while the six other councillors were elected proportionally as one entire ward. The last election was held on 8 September 2012, and the makeup of the former council, including the mayor, was as follows:

Party	Councillors
Independents and Unaligned	7
Total	7

The last Council, elected in 2012, in order of election, was:

Councillor	Party	Notes
John Cahill	Independent	Mayor
Peter Beer	Independent	
Vickii Wallace	Independent	
John Shumack	Unaligned	
Bob Frost	Independent	
Colin Stewart-Beardsley	Independent	
Bill Smits	Independent	
