= Goobang Shire =

Former local government area in New South Wales, Australia

Goobang Shire New South Wales
- Population: 5,307 (1961)
- Established: 7 March 1906
- Abolished: 1 January 1981
- Council seat: Parkes, New South Wales
- Region: Central West

Goobang Shire was a local government area in the Central West region of New South Wales, Australia.

Goobang Shire was proclaimed on 7 March 1906. Its offices were based in the town of Parkes, New South Wales.

It absorbed the Municipality of Peak Hill on 1 November 1971

In 1961 Goobang Shire had a population of 5307.

The Local Government Areas Amalgamation Act 1980 saw the amalgamation of Goobang Shire with the Municipality of Parkes to form Parkes Shire on 1 January 1981.
