= Jemalong Shire =

Former local government area in New South Wales, Australia

Jemalong Shire New South Wales
- Established: 7 March 1906
- Abolished: 1 January 1981
- Council seat: Forbes, New South Wales
- Region: Central West

Jemalong Shire was a local government area in the Central West region of New South Wales, Australia.

Jemalong Shire was proclaimed on 7 March 1906. Its offices were based in the town of Forbes, New South Wales.

The Local Government Areas Amalgamation Act 1980 saw the amalgamation of Jemalong Shire with the Municipality of Forbes to form Forbes Shire on 1 January 1981.
