= Amaroo Shire =

Former local government area in New South Wales, Australia

Amaroo Shire New South Wales
- Established: 7 March 1906
- Abolished: 1 January 1951
- Council seat: Cumnock
- Region: Central West

Amaroo Shire was a local government area in the Central West region of New South Wales, Australia.

Amaroo Shire was proclaimed on 7 March 1906, one of 134 shires created after the passing of the Local Government (Shires) Act 1905.

The shire offices were based in Cumnock. Urban areas in the shire included Cumnock and Yeoval.

The shire was amalgamated with the Municipality of Molong to form Molong Shire on 1 January 1951.
