= Narraburra Shire =

Former local government area in New South Wales, Australia

- Local government area
- Country: Australia
- State: New South Wales
- Region: Riverina
- Established: 24 November 1906
- Abolished: 1 January 1981
- Council seat: Temora

Narraburra Shire was a local government area in the Riverina region of New South Wales, Australia. It was established on 7 March 1906, incorporating the area around the town of Temora, but did not include Temora.

The grazier, cricketer and politician Geoffrey Keighley was President of Narraburra Shire from 1963 to 1967.

In 1981 Narraburra Shire was merged with the Municipality of Temora to form Temora Shire.
