= Greater Newcastle Act 1937 =

Former law in New South Wales

Parliament of New South Wales
- Long title: An Act to unite the City of Newcastle and certain other areas and parts of areas and to constitute the united area as a city; to provide for the division of the united area into wards; to confer and impose certain powers, authorities, duties and functions upon the Council of the united area; to repeal the Newcastle District Abattoir and Sale-yards Act, 1912, and certain other Acts; to amend the Local Government Act, 1919, and certain other Acts in certain respects; and for purposes connected therewith
- Citation: 1937 No. 20
- Enacted by: Parliament of New South Wales
- Royal assent: 15 December 1937

Legislative history
- First reading: 19 November 1937

Related legislation
- Local Government Act 1919

Greater Newcastle Act 1937 was a New South Wales statute with the purpose of amalgamating a series of local government areas to create the City of Greater Newcastle. The Act also transferred parts of Lake Macquarie Shire and Tarro Shire to the new city. The amalgamations and transfers took effect from 2 April 1938.

The newly created City of Greater Newcastle was subsequently renamed to City of Newcastle on 23 March 1949.

== Background ==
=== Problem and initial amalgamation attempts ===
The area around the City of Newcastle as it existed in the late 19th century was divided into a series of small, physically discrete townships—each with their own sense of local identity, Between 1870 and 1890 each of these townships eventually established their own municipal body to deliver essential services such as roads, drainage and nightsoil collection. This fragmented system of local administration created some problems including the unequal distribution of resources (with rate revenues tied to property values), high administration costs and a poor standard of public administration.

By as early as 1891, the Newcastle Morning Herald was already speculating about the future amalgamation of these townships into a Greater Newcastle, stating " It is possible that, in the near future, similar action will be taken with regard to the Borough of Newcastle and adjacent municipalities; for the open spaces which at one time separated the parent municipality from its children are being quickly built upon, and the indisposition of councils to co-operate for the carrying out of necessary improvements have been often unfavourable to the health and interests of the ratepayers of the municipalities concerned".

Arthur Griffith, the New South Wales Member of Parliament for Waratah, proposed a scheme for the creation of Greater Newcastle in 1901. At a meeting in February 1901, Griffith expressed his surprise at the number of "pocket-handkerchief municipalities" and his concern about their solvency - offering as a solution a £30,000 grant to kick start a newly unified city council. The abortive proposal soon lapsed, the result of a lack of enthusiasm from both the municipalities and the general public.

In 1919, the New South Wales government held a Royal Commission into the question of the Constitution of a Greater Newcastle. The president was Arthur James with 4 commissioners. The Royal Commission made three broad recommendations:

1. It defined boundaries for a future Greater Newcastle - including "essential" and "additional" areas;
2. It recommended a 20-member council elected from five wards and a directly elected mayor. Day-to-day administration was recommended to be vested in a general manager in a council–manager government arrangement.
3. It recommended the new council should be given an extensive range of powers, including utilities such as electricity, gas, water and sewerage as well as services such as transport and slaughter yards.

A change of the New South Wales government and subsequent responsible minister combined with hostility from some of the municipalities and other vested interests saw these recommendations lapse.

=== Amalgamation success ===
The Great Depression had a significant effect on Newcastle and on the finances and operations of its constituent municipalities. In an attempt to address some of the problems of the struggling Councils, in 1933 the Mayor of Newcastle, William Shedden, who had been one of the Royal Commissioners, and Eric Spooner, the Minister for Local Government revived the idea of a Greater Newcastle. Much of the ensuing debate regarding amalgamation related to rating and land values; the City of Newcastle had higher property values and hence a larger and stronger rate base than the suburban municipalities. The push for amalgamation stalled when Premier Bertram Stevens pledged that Greater Newcastle would not happen if it would lead to an increase in rates, followed closely by the death of Shedden, the amalgamation's leading local advocate.

It wasn't until 1937 that Spooner was able to bring the issue of a Greater Newcastle to a head. Spooner introduced the Greater Newcastle Bill in November that year - with minimal consultation with the affected Councils. The Bill had the qualified support of the local Members of Parliament and was passed and given assent in less than a month. The Act set the date for amalgamation as 1 March 1938 or "such later day as may be proclaimed by the Governor." The actual amalgamation date was set by proclamation as 2 April 1938.

== Abolished municipalities ==
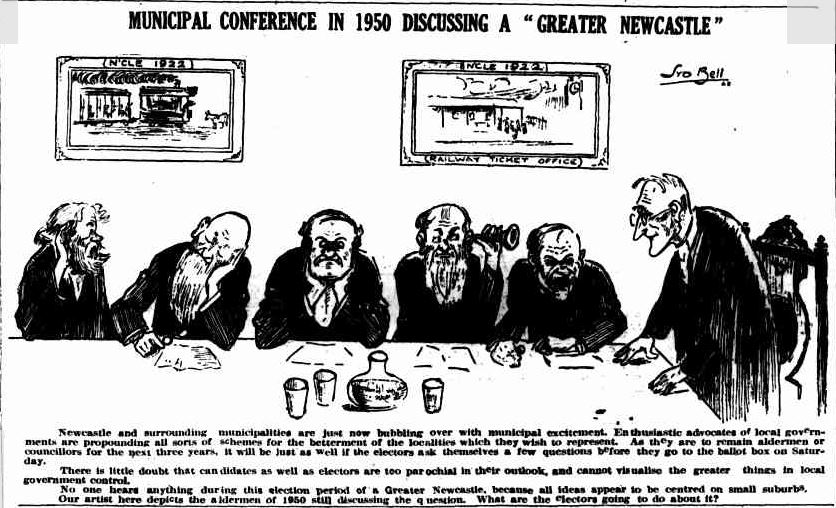
A 1922 cartoon complaining about slow progress towards the unification of Newcastle into one city. It would be another 17 years before unification happened.

Municipality	Date established	Population			
Municipality	Date established	1891	1901	1911	1921
Adamstown	31 December 1885	2,030	2,420	2,660	3,959
Carrington	28 March 1887	2,137	2,547	2,685	3,115
Hamilton	11 December 1871	4,844	6,124	7,908	14,196
Lambton	26 June 1871	3,436	3,159	2,796	3,691
Merewether	20 August 1885	4,399	4,547	4,151	5,908
New Lambton	1 August 1889	1,548	1,578	1,827	3,550
Stockton	12 October 1889	2,417	2,549	2,106	4,598
Wallsend	27 February 1874	6,945	6,997	6,007	6,446
Waratah	23 February 1871	2,718	3,080	4,419	12,192
Wickham	25 February 1871	6,582	7,752	8,434	12,151

== See also ==
- Local Government (Areas) Act 1948
- Greater Perth movement
