= Palerang Council =

Former local government area in New South Wales, Australia

Palerang
- Local government area
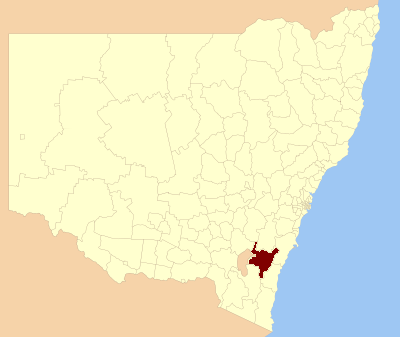
- Location in New South Wales
- Coordinates: 35°15′S 149°27′E
- Country: Australia
- State: New South Wales
- Region: Southern Tablelands
- Established: 11 February 2004
- Abolished: 12 May 2016
- Council seat: Bungendore

Government
  - Last Mayor: Pete Harrison
  - State electorates: Monaro; Goulburn
  - Federal division: Eden-Monaro

Area
  - Total: 5,134 km^{2} (1,982 sq mi)

Population
  - Total: 15,306 (2013 est)
  - Density: 2.9813/km^{2} (7.7215/sq mi)
- Website: Palerang
LGAs around Palerang
Yass Valley	Upper Lachlan	Goulburn Mulwaree
Queanbeyan	Palerang	Shoalhaven
ACT	Cooma-Monaro	Eurobodalla

The Palerang Council was a local government area located in the Southern Tablelands region of New South Wales, Australia. On 12 May 2016 the Minister for Local Government announced dissolution of the Palerang Council with immediate effect. Together with Queanbeyan City the combined council areas were merged to establish the Queanbeyan-Palerang Regional Council. Both councils had opposed the amalgamation. Elections for the new Council area were held in September 2017. The former mayor of Queanbeyan City Council was appointed by the New South Wales Government as administrator until that date.

The last mayor of the Palerang Council was Pete Harrison, an independent politician.

== Municipal history ==
Originally known as the Eastern Capital City Regional Council (Until 8 December), Palerang was proclaimed on 11 February 2004 when Tallaganda Shire was amalgamated with most of Yarrowlumla Shire and small parts of Cooma-Monaro Shire, Gunning Shire and Mulwaree Shire.

A 2015 review of local government boundaries recommended that the Palerang Council merge with adjoining councils. The New South Wales Government considered three options. The first two options were to merge parts of the Palerang Council with the Goulburn Mulwaree Council to form a new council with an area of 4,748 square kilometres (1,833 sq mi) and support a population of approximately 31,000; and to merge the remaining parts of Palerang with the City of Queanbeyan to form a new council with an area of 3,791 square kilometres (1,464 sq mi) and support a population of approximately 55,000. The alternative, proposed by Palerang Council on 29 January 2016, was for an amalgamation of the whole of Palerang with Queanbeyan City Council. On 12 May 2016 the Minister for Local Government announced dissolution of the Palerang Council with immediate effect. Together with Queanbeyan City the combined council areas were merged to establish the Queanbeyan-Palerang Regional Council.

== Towns and localities ==
The former area was named after Mount Palerang, located close to the geographical centre, and one of the highest points in the former council's area. The area that was covered under administration extended to Lake George in the north, the Tallaganda State Forest in the south, Queanbeyan to the west and the Morton and Budawang National Parks to the east. The Kings Highway and the Sydney-Canberra railway pass through the former Palerang Council area.

Predominantly rural in nature, the Palerang Council area comprised the towns of Bungendore, Braidwood and Captains Flat, and the villages of Araluen, Majors Creek, Mongarlowe and Nerriga. It also encompasses the rural residential areas of Wamboin, Bywong, Burra, Urila, Hoskinstown, Rossi and parts of Carwoola, Royalla, and Sutton. Plus, there are additional localities within the area such as: Back Creek, Ballalaba, Bendoura, Berlang, Bombay, Boro, Budawang, Charleys Forest, Corang, Currawang, Durran Durra, Farringdon, Forbes Creek, Harolds Cross, Hereford Hall, Jembaicumbene, Jerrabattgulla, Jinden, Kindervale, Krawarree, Lake George, Larbert, Manar, Marlowe, Mayfield, Monga, Mount Fairy, Mulloon, Neringla, Northangera, Palerang, Primrose Valley, Reidsdale, Rossi, Snowball, Tomboye, Warri, Williamsdale, Wog Wog, Wyanbene, Yarrow, and parts of Oallen, Tarago and Tinderry.

Around two-thirds of the Palerang population was concentrated in Bungendore and the rural residential areas adjacent to the Australian Capital Territory border, with many residents commuting daily to Canberra or Queanbeyan. Cattle grazing is the primary agricultural pursuit in the former area, with more recent development of niche rural industries such as vineyards, olive groves and alpaca breeding. About one quarter of the former Palerang Council area is managed for conservation, with significant areas of national park.

== Council ==
=== Current composition and election method ===
Until its dissolution, Palerang Council was composed of nine councillors elected proportionally as one entire ward. All councillors were elected for a fixed four-year term of office. The mayor was elected by the councillors at the first meeting of the council. The most recent and last election was held on 8 September 2012, and the makeup of the former council was as follows:

Party	Councillors
Independents and Unaligned	8
Country Labor	1
Total	9

The last council, elected in 2012 and dissolved in 2016, in order of election, was:

Councillor	Party	Notes
Pete Harrison	Independent	Mayor
Mark Schweikert	Independent	
Belinda Hogarth-Boyd	Unaligned	Deputy Mayor
Garth Morrison	Country Labor	
Keith France	Independent	
Trevor Hicks	Independent	
Paul Cockram	Independent	
Peter Marshall	Unaligned	Member of The Greens
Richard Graham	Independent	
