= Greater Hume Shire =

Greater Hume
- Local government area
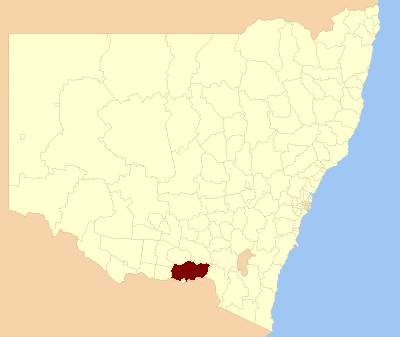
- Location in New South Wales

- Interactive map of Greater Hume
- Coordinates: 35°42′14.94″S 147°9′13.07″E
- Country: Australia
- State: New South Wales
- Region: Riverina
- Established: 2004
- Council seat: Holbrook

Government
  - Mayor: Tony Quinn
  - State electorate: Albury
  - Federal division: Farrer

Area
  - Total: 5,746 km^{2} (2,219 sq mi)

Population
  - Totals: 10,351 (2016); 10,686 (2018 est.)
  - Density: 1.80143/km^{2} (4.6657/sq mi)
- Website: Greater Hume
LGAs around Greater Hume
Lockhart	Wagga Wagga	Snowy Valleys
Federation	Greater Hume	Snowy Valleys
Indigo (Vic)	Albury	Snowy Valleys

Greater Hume Shire is a local government area in the Riverina region of southern New South Wales, Australia. The Shire was formed in 2004 incorporating Culcairn Shire, the majority of Holbrook Shire and part of Hume Shire. The shire had an estimated population of 10,137 as at 2012.

The Shire is located adjacent to the Hume, Olympic and Riverina Highways and the Sydney–Melbourne railway.

The mayor of the Greater Hume Shire Council is Heather Wilton, an independent politician.

== Towns and localities ==
Major towns in the Shire are Holbrook and Culcairn. Other towns are: Brocklesby, Bungowannah, Burrumbuttock, Gerogery and Gerogery West, Henty, Jindera, Morven, Walbundrie and Walla Walla.

Towns such as Howlong were cut off from Hume Shire in the amalgamation. Howlong is now a part of Federation Council.

== Council ==
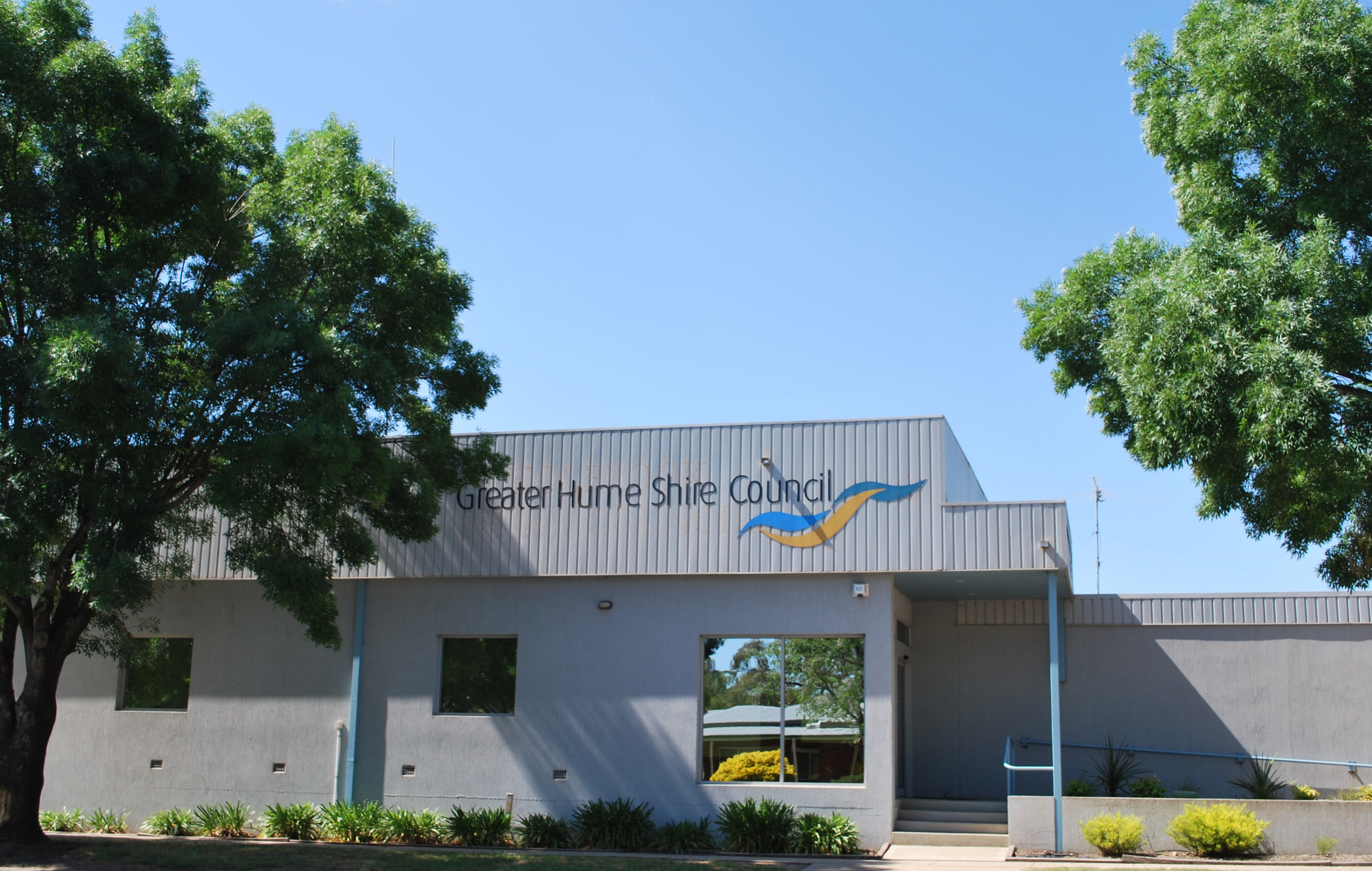
Council offices in Holbrook

=== Current composition and election method ===
Greater Hume Shire Council is composed of nine councillors elected proportionally as three separate wards, each electing three councillors. All councillors are elected for a fixed four-year term of office. The mayor is elected by the councillors at the first meeting of the council.

Party	Councillors
Independents and unaligned	9
Total	9

== Election results ==
=== 2024 ===
2024 New South Wales local elections: Greater Hume
Party	Votes	%	Swing	Seats	Change
Independent					
Independent Liberal					
Formal votes					
Informal votes					
Total				9	

=== 2021 ===
2021 New South Wales local elections: Greater Hume
Party	Votes	%	Swing	Seats	Change
Independent	4,037	100.0		9	Steady
Formal votes	4,037	95.60			
Informal votes	186	4.40			
Total	4,223	100.00		9	

== See also ==
- Riverina Water County Council
