= Tamarang Shire =

Former local government area in New South Wales, Australia

Tamarang Shire is a former local government area in New South Wales, Australia.

Tamarang Shire included a long narrow strip of land stretching across the southern Liverpool Plains, east and west of, but not including Quirindi, New South Wales, which had a separate municipal local government area. There were several villages, but no significant towns, in the shire.

It was merged with Quirindi Municipality in 1981 to form Quirindi Shire, which was subsequently merged with parts of several other shires to form Liverpool Plains Shire, in 2004.
