= Cooma-Monaro Shire =

Former local government area in New South Wales, Australia

Cooma-Monaro
- Local government area
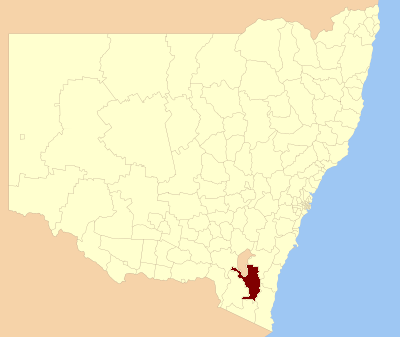
- Location in New South Wales
- Country: Australia
- State: New South Wales
- Region: Monaro
- Established: 1981
- Abolished: 12 May 2016
- Council seat: Cooma

Government
  - Mayor: Dean Lynch
  - State electorate: Monaro
  - Federal division: Eden-Monaro

Area
  - Total: 5,229 km^{2} (2,019 sq mi)

Population
  - Total: 10,073 (2013 est)
  - Density: 1.92637/km^{2} (4.9893/sq mi)
- Website: Cooma-Monaro
LGAs around Cooma-Monaro
Tumut	ACT	Palerang
Snowy River	Cooma-Monaro	Eurobodalla
Snowy River	Bombala	Bega Valley

Cooma-Monaro Shire was a local government area located in the Monaro region of southern New South Wales, Australia. The area was named after the former Cooma Municipality and the former Monaro Shire, that were amalgamated to create it. The Municipality of Cooma was established in 1879, and the Monaro Shire was one of several shires established in 1906. The Monaro Shire and Cooma Municipal Council amalgamated in 1981. On 11 February 2004, Cooma-Monaro Shire absorbed a small part of the former Yarrowlumla Shire, near Michelago.

A 2015 review of local government boundaries recommended that the Cooma-Monaro Shire merge with the Bombala and Snowy River shires to form a new council with an area of 15,162 square kilometres (5,854 sq mi) and support a population of approximately 21,000. On 12 May 2016, the Cooma-Monaro Shire merged with Bombala and Snowy River shires to form the Snowy Monaro Regional Council.

The last mayor of the Cooma-Monaro Shire Council was Dean Lynch, an independent politician. Lynch was appointed as the Administrator of the merged Snowy Monaro Regional Council.

== Towns and localities ==
The Shire developed from the village of Cooma, which was first surveyed in March 1849. It also included the small towns of Nimmitabel, Numeralla, Bredbo and Michelago. Other populated areas included the villages and surrounding districts of Adaminaby, Anglers Reach, Shannons Flat, Yaouk, Old Adaminaby, Peak View, Countegany, Jerangle and Rock Flat.

== Council ==
=== Composition and election method ===
At the time of dissolution Cooma-Monaro Shire Council was composed of nine councillors elected proportionally as one entire ward. All councillors were elected for a fixed four-year term of office. The mayor was elected by the councillors at the first meeting of the council. The last election was held on 8 September 2012, and the makeup of the council was as follows:

Party	Councillors
Independents and Unaligned	9
Total	9

The last Council, elected in 2012 and dissolved in 2016, in order of election, was:

Councillor	Party	Notes
Dean Lynch	Independent	Mayor
Bronnie Taylor	Independent	Deputy Mayor
Rogan Corbett	Unaligned	
Winston Phillips	Independent	
Angela Ingram	Independent	
Martin Hughes	Independent	
Ignazio Mondello	Independent	
Craig Mitchell	Independent	
Tony Kaltoum	Unaligned	
