= Tallaganda Shire =

Former local government area in New South Wales, Australia

Tallaganda Shire, was a local government area in New South Wales centered on Braidwood, New South Wales It lasted from colonial times until February 2004, when the local government organisation was absorbed into newly created Palerang Council.

In 2000 shortly before its absorption into Palerang Council, the Shire of Tallaganda was described as

The Shire has a small population, but is in a favorable location within the Sydney, Canberra, Batemans Bay triangle and its population is not going backwards. Unlike almost all of regional Australia, the Shire does not suffer from a lack of visitors. In fact it has a steady flow of visitors every day of the year, providing great opportunities for suitable business ideas. And also unlike similar small shires in many rural areas, the Shire is not in crisis.
