= Gunning Shire =

Former local government area in New South Wales, Australia

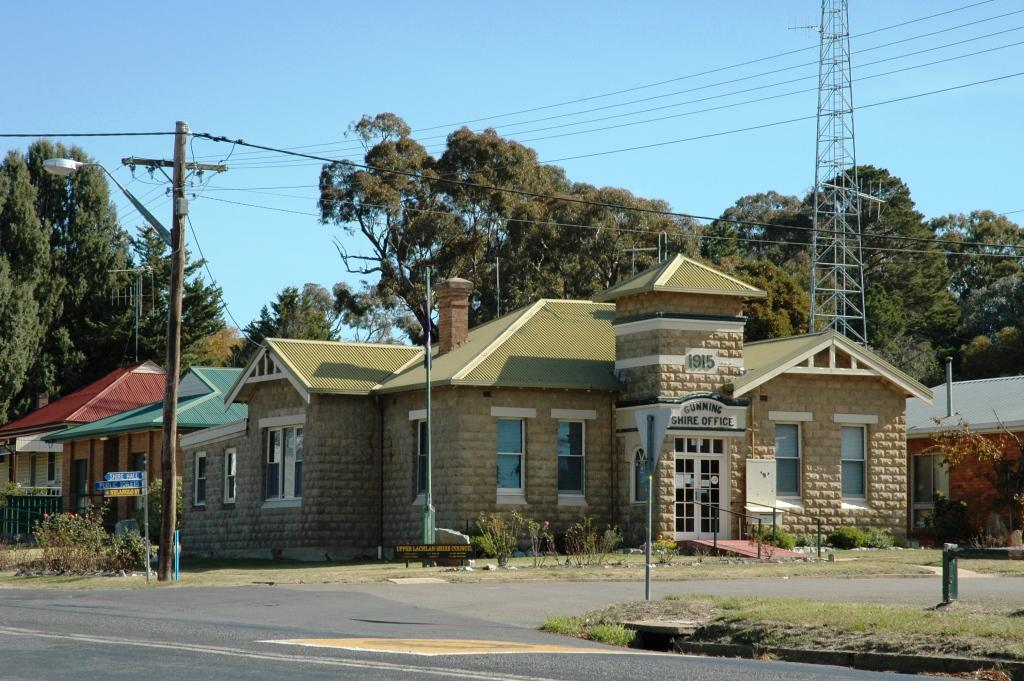
The Shire Council office in the main street of Gunning in 2008

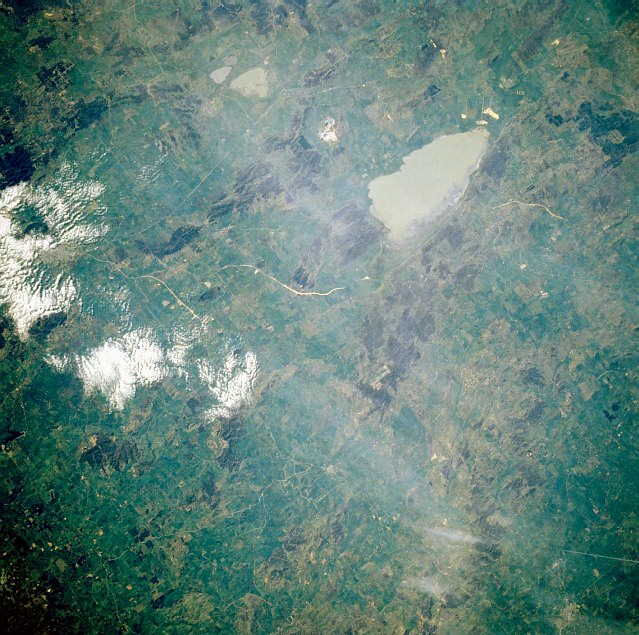
The Shire from Space at bottom of picture

Gunning Shire was a local government area in New South Wales centered on Gunning, New South Wales north of the Australian Capital Territory until February 2004, when the local government organisation was absorbed into newly created Palerang Council and Upper Lachlan Shire.

== History ==
The Gunning region was originally home to two Australian Aboriginal language groups, the Gundungurra people in the north and the Ngunnawal people in the south and was first explored by Europeans in 1820, and settled the next year by Hamilton Hume. In 1824, Hume and William Hovell left here to discover the overland route to Port Phillip Bay where Melbourne is sited. The town of Dalton, is known as the earthquake center of New South Wales. In 2004 the shire was absorbed into Upper Lachlan Shire.
