= Cabonne Council =

- Local government area
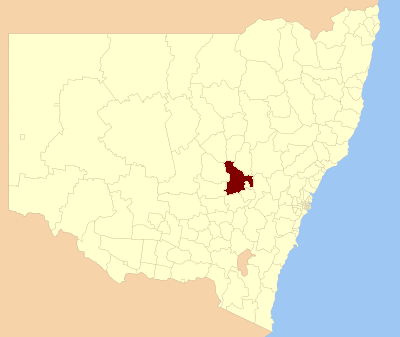
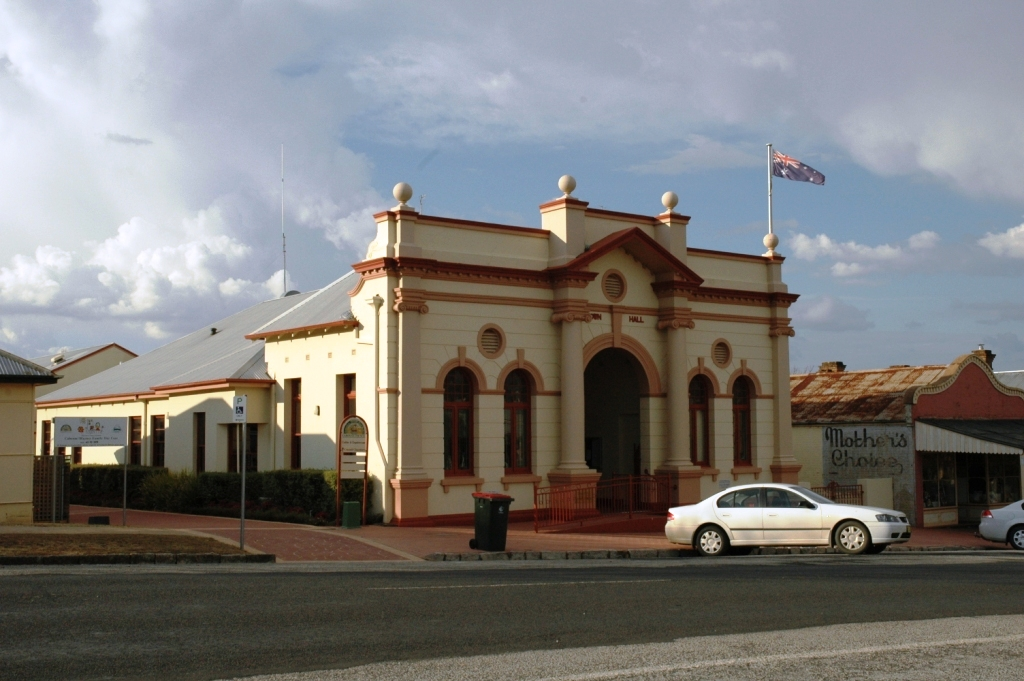
- Location in New South Wales The Cabonne Council chambers in Bank Street, Molong.

- Interactive map of Cabonne Council
- Coordinates: 33°06′S 148°51′E
- Country: Australia
- State: New South Wales
- Region: Central West
- Established: 1978
- Council seat: Molong

Government
  - Mayor: Kevin Beatty (Independent)
  - State electorate: Orange
  - Federal division: Calare

Area
  - Total: 6,026 km^{2} (2,327 sq mi)

Population
  - Totals: 13,386 (2016 census); 13,680 (2018 est.)
  - Density: 2.22137/km^{2} (5.7533/sq mi)
- Website: Cabonne Council
LGAs around Cabonne Council
Parkes	Dubbo	Dubbo
Forbes	Cabonne Council	Orange
Weddin	Cowra	Blayney

Cabonne Council is a local government area in the Central West region of New South Wales, Australia. The Shire is located adjacent to the Mitchell Highway and the Broken Hill railway line, partly surrounding the City of Orange. The administrative centre is located at Molong.

As at the 2016 census, the population of the Shire was estimated to be 13,860. More than half of the businesses in the region, being 858 of 1683, are classified as part of the agricultural sector.

The mayor of the Cabonne Council is Cr. Kevin Beatty, an independent politician.

== Towns and localities ==
The towns and localities in the Cabonne Council area are:

- Boree
- Borenore
- Cadia
- Canowindra (shared with Cowra)
- Cargo
- Cudal
- Cumnock
- Eugowra (shared with Forbes)
- Kerrs Creek
- Manildra
- Molong
- Moorbel
- Mullion Creek
- Murga
- Nashdale
- Toogong
- Windera
- Yeoval

== Demographics ==
Selected historical census data for Cabonne Shire local government area
Census year		2011	2016
Population	Estimated residents on census night	12,821	13,386
Population	% of New South Wales population	0.19%	0.18%
Population	% of Australian population	0.06%	0.06%
Cultural and language diversity			
Ancestry, top responses	English	36.1%	35.8%
Ancestry, top responses	Australian	31.8%	31.7%
Ancestry, top responses	Irish	10.4%	9.5%
Ancestry, top responses	Scottish	7.7%	7.6%
Ancestry, top responses	German	2.8%	2.5%
Language	English only spoken at home	95.6%	91.3%
Religious affiliation			
Religious affiliation, top responses	Catholic	30.3%	27.9%
Religious affiliation, top responses	Anglican	30.1%	26.6%
Religious affiliation, top responses	No Religion	13.1%	17.5%
Religious affiliation, top responses	Uniting Church	9.5%	7.8%
Median weekly incomes			
Personal income	Median weekly personal income	$523	$631
Personal income	% of Australian median income	93.2%	95.0%
Family income	Median weekly family income	$1,293	$1,618
Family income	% of Australian median income	87.5%	90.9%
Household income	Median weekly household income	$1,036	$1,301
Household income	% of Australian median income	83.8%	87.6%

== Council ==
=== Current composition and election method ===
Cabonne Shire Council is composed of nine councillors elected proportionally as a single ward. All councillors are elected for a fixed four-year term of office. The mayor is elected by the councillors at the first meeting of the council. The most recent election was held on 4 December 2021, and the makeup of the council is as follows:

Party	Councillors
Independent	8
Independent National	1
Total	9

The current Council, elected in 2021, in order of election, is:

Councillor	Party	Notes
Marlene Nash	Independent	
Kevin Beatty	Independent	Mayor
Jamie Jones	Independent National	Deputy Mayor
Andrew Pull	Unaligned	
Peter Batten	Independent	
Andrew Rawson	Independent	
Kathryn O'Ryan	Unaligned	
Jenny Weaver	Unaligned	
Libby Oldham	Independent	

== Election results ==
=== 2024 ===
2024 New South Wales local elections: Cabonne
Party	Candidate	Votes	%	±%
Independent	Kevin Beatty (elected)	2,077	26.9	+3.2
Independent National	Jamie Jones (elected)	826	10.7	+2.6
Independent	Marlene Nash (elected)	778	10.1	−3.8
Independent	Aaron Pearson (elected)	711	9.2	+4.4
Independent	Peter Batten (elected)	707	9.2	+2.7
Independent	Andrew Pull (elected)	598	7.8	−1.5
Independent	Andrew Rawson (elected)	587	7.6	−0.6
Independent	Kathryn O'Ryan (elected)	592	7.7	−0.7
Independent	Jennifer Weaver (elected)	465	6.0	+2.8
Independent	Guin Dickie	379	4.9	
Total formal votes		7,720	90.7	
Informal votes		796	9.3	
Turnout		8,516	83.4	

=== 2021 ===
2021 New South Wales local elections: Cabonne
Party	Candidate	Votes	%	±%
Independent	Kevin Beatty (elected)	1,859	23.7	
Independent	Marlene Nash (elected)	1,090	13.9	
Independent	Andrew Pull (elected)	726	9.3	
Independent	Kathryn O'Ryan (elected)	657	8.4	
Independent	Andrew Rawson (elected)	641	8.2	
Independent	Jamie Jones (elected)	638	8.1	
Independent	Peter Batten (elected)	511	6.5	
Independent	Libby Oldham (elected)	378	4.8	
Independent	Aaron Pearson	375	4.8	
Independent	Kevin Walker	293	3.7	
Independent	Jenny Weaver (elected)	250	3.2	
Independent	Paul Mullins	205	2.6	
Total formal votes		7,836	92.7	
Informal votes		618	7.3	
Turnout		8,454	84.0	

=== 2017 ===
2017 New South Wales local elections: Cabonne
Party	Candidate	Votes	%	±%
Independent	Kevin Beatty (elected)	919	12.2	
Independent	Peter Batten (elected)	867	11.5	
Independent	Kevin Walker (elected)	842	11.1	
Independent	Greg Treavors (elected)	705	9.3	
Independent	Marlene Nash (elected)	629	8.3	
Independent	Cheryl Newsom (elected)	624	8.1	
Independent	Jamie Jones (elected)	592	7.8	
Independent	Ian Davison (elected)	545	7.2	
Independent	Libby Oldham (elected)	411	5.4	
Independent	Anthony Durkin (elected)	396	5.2	
Independent	Jenny Waver (elected)	324	4.3	
Independent	Paul Mullins (elected)	301	4.0	
Independent	Duncan Brakell	226	3.0	
Independent	Derek Johnson	184	2.4	
Total formal votes		7,555	89.88	
Informal votes		851	10.12	
Turnout		8,406	84.80	

== History ==
The first Australian gold rush occurred at Ophir within the present shire boundary.

Cabonne Shire was formed in 1978 following the amalgamation of Molong Shire, Boree Shire and the greater part of Canobolas Shire.

=== Proposed amalgamation ===
A 2015 review of local government boundaries recommended that the Cabonne Shire merge with the Orange City and Blayney Shire Councils to form a new council with an area of 7,833 square kilometres (3,024 sq mi) and support a population of approximately 63,000. As a result of the state government's decision to not proceed with proposed council amalgamations, this no longer applies.

=== Boundary Adjustment ===
Previously part of Dubbo Regional Council, from 1 July 2026, the locality known as North Yeoval was included within the boundaries of Cabonne Council.

== Industry ==
The Manildra Group flour mill, one of the ten largest flour mills globally, is located within the shire at Manildra.
