= List of former local government areas in New South Wales =

The local government areas (LGAs) of New South Wales, Australia are the defined areas within which legally constituted local government authorities, known as councils, have responsibilities to provide local services. Determining the size and shape of the local government areas is the sole responsibility of the Government of New South Wales.

In the past, many local government areas have been amalgamated or abolished, either voluntarily or involuntarily. Major changes occurred as a result of the enactment of the Local Government (Areas) Act 1948 and as a result of a review by the NSW Independent Pricing and Regulatory Tribunal (IPART) that commenced in 2013. The IPART proposed a series of council mergers and amalgamation in both metropolitan and regional areas which proposed a reduction in the number of councils from 152 to 112. On 12 May 2016, following a further review by the Minister for Local Government and the independent Local Government Boundaries Commission, Premier Mike Baird announced Stage 1 starting with 19 new councils, through amalgamations and mergers, with immediate effect. The Minister indicated in principle support to create a further nine new councils, subject to the decision of the courts. On the same day, the Governor of New South Wales acted on the advice of the Minister, and proclaimed the 19 new local government areas. Another proclamation occurred a few months later with the amalgamation of City of Botany Bay and City of Rockdale.

== List of former local government areas in New South Wales ==
=== Greater Sydney ===
==== Metropolitan Sydney ====
Former LGA	Type	Council seat	Region	Established	Abolished	Area		Popn. (year)	Notes
Former LGA	Type	Council seat	Region	Established	Abolished	km^{2}	sq mi	Popn. (year)	Notes
Alexandria	Municipality	Alexandria	Sydney	27 August 1868	31 December 1948				Amalgamated with the City of Sydney
Annandale	Municipality	Annandale	Inner West	29 December 1893	31 December 1948				Amalgamated with Balmain and Leichhardt municipalities to form Municipality of Leichhardt
Ashfield	Municipality	Ashfield	Inner West	28 December 1871	12 May 2016	8	3.1	41,214 (2011)	Abolished and merged with Marrickville Council and Municipality of Leichhardt to establish Inner West Council.
Auburn	City	Auburn	Western Sydney	19 February 1892	12 May 2016	32	12	80,892 (2011)	Parts of Auburn City were amalgamated with parts of Parramatta and Holroyd to form Cumberland Council. The remainder parts of Auburn were amalgamated into City of Parramatta Council.
Balmain	Municipality	Balmain	Inner West	21 February 1860	31 December 1948				Amalgamated with Annandale and Leichhardt municipalities to form Municipality of Leichhardt
Bankstown	City	Bankstown	Canterbury-Bankstown	7 September 1895	12 May 2016	76.8	29.7	193,398 (2011)	Abolished and merged with City of Canterbury to establish City of Canterbury-Bankstown.
Baulkham Hills	Shire		Hills District	7 March 1906	14 November 2008				Renamed as The Hills Shire
Bexley	Municipality	Bexley	Southern Sydney	28 June 1900	31 December 1948				Merged with Rockdale Municipality.
Botany Bay	City		Southern Sydney	29 March 1888	9 September 2016				Proclaimed as Borough of Botany. Changed to Municipality in 1906. Proclaimed "City of Botany Bay" in 1996. Merged with City of Rockdale on 9 September 2016 to form Bayside Council
Cabramatta and Canley Vale	Municipality		Western Sydney	8 October 1892	31 December 1948				Originally part of Municipal District of Liverpool from 1872. Amalgamated with Municipality of Fairfield.
Camperdown	Municipality	Camperdown	Sydney	13 November 1862	22 December 1908				Amalgamated with City of Sydney
Canterbury	City	Canterbury	Canterbury-Bankstown	17 March 1879	12 May 2016	34	13	146,314 (2011)	Abolished and merged with City of Bankstown to establish City of Canterbury-Bankstown.
Castlereagh	Municipality	Castlereagh	Western Sydney	7 September 1895	31 December 1948				Amalgamated with Penrith Municipality, St. Mary's Municipality and part of Nepean Shire to form, Municipality of Penrith.
Concord	Municipality	Concord	Inner West	11 August 1883	1 December 2000				Amalgamated with Drummoyne Council to form City of Canada Bay.
Cook	Municipality		Sydney	13 November 1862	19 February 1870				Amalgamated with Municipality of Camperdown
Darlington	Municipality	Darlington	Sydney	16 August 1864	31 December 1948	0.2	0.077		Abolished and merged into City of Sydney. The former Darlington council area subsequently became part of South Sydney Municipality, which was later merged into City of Sydney in 1992.
Drummoyne	Municipality	Drummoyne	Inner West	17 January 1890	1 December 2000				Originally part of Municipal District of Five Dock since 25 July 1871. Amalgamated with Five Dock to form Borough of Drummoyne on 12 March 1902. Amalgamated with Municipality of Concord to form City of Canada Bay.
Dundas	Municipality	Dundas	Western Sydney	23 March 1889	31 December 1948				Amalgamated with Parramatta City, Granville Municipality and Ermington and Rydalmere Municipality, to form City of Parramatta.
East St Leonard's	Municipality			17 August 1860	29 July 1890				Amalgamated with St Leonard's and Victoria boroughs to form North Sydney Borough
Eastwood	Municipality		Northern Suburbs	16 August 1907	31 December 1948				Municipality of Marsfield renamed Eastwood. Amalgamated with Municipality of Ryde.
Enfield	Municipality	Enfield	Inner West	17 January 1889	31 December 1948				Divided between Municipality of Burwood and Municipality of Strathfield.
Ermington and Rydalmere	Municipality	Rydalmere	Western Sydney	18 June 1891	31 December 1948				Originally part of Municipal District of Dundas from 1889. Amalgamated with Parramatta City, Dundas Municipality and Granville Municipality, to form City of Parramatta.
Erskineville	Municipality		Sydney	27 March 1893	31 December 1948				Originally named Macdonald Town. Abolished and merged into City of Sydney.
Five Dock	Municipal District		Inner West	25 July 1871	12 March 1902				Amalgamated with Borough of Drummoyne.
The Glebe	Municipality		Sydney	1 August 1859	31 December 1948				Abolished and merged into City of Sydney.
Granville	Municipality	Granville	Western Sydney	20 January 1885	31 December 1948				Amalgamated with Parramatta City, Dundas Municipality and Ermington and Rydalmere Municipality, to form City of Parramatta. Much of the area this former Municipality, as Woodville Ward of City of Parramatta, was merged with parts of Auburn and Holroyd Cities to form Cumberland Council on 12 May 2016.
Holroyd	City	Merrylands	Western Sydney	10 January 1927	12 May 2016	40	15	99,163 (2011)	Originally named Prospect and Sherwood. Abolished and parts of City of Holroyd, along with parts of Auburn and Parramatta city councils merged to form Cumberland Council, with a smaller minority of City of Holroyd merged to establish City of Parramatta Council.
Homebush	Municipality		Inner West	6 June 1906	22 May 1947				Amalgamated with Municipality of Strathfield.
Hurstville	City	Hurstville	Southern Sydney	25 March 1887	12 May 2016	23	8.9	80,823 (2011)	Abolished and merged with Kogarah City Council to establish Georges River Council.
Ingleburn	Municipality	Ingleburn	South-western Sydney	25 April 1896	31 December 1948				Amalgamated with Municipality of Campbelltown.
Kogarah	City	Kogarah	Southern Sydney	22 December 1885	12 May 2016	19.5	7.5	55,806 (2011)	Abolished and merged with Hurstville City Council to establish Georges River Council.
Leichhardt	Municipality	Leichhardt	Inner West	14 December 1871	12 May 2016	11	4.2	52,198 (2011)	Abolished and merged with Marrickville Council and Municipality of Ashfield to establish Inner West Council.
Lidcombe	Municipality	Lidcombe	Western Sydney	22 October 1913	31 December 1948				Amalgamated with Municipality of Auburn.
Macdonald Town	Municipality	Erskineville		23 May 1872	27 March 1893				Renamed Erskineville Municipality
Manly	Municipality	Manly	Northern Beaches	6 January 1877	12 May 2016	15	5.8	39,747 (2011)	Abolished and merged with Pittwater and Warringah councils to establish Northern Beaches Council.
Marrickville	Municipality	Petersham	Inner West	1 November 1861	12 May 2016	17	6.6	76,500 (2011)	Abolished and merged with Municipalities of Leichhardt and Ashfield to establish Inner West Council.
Marsfield	Municipality		Northern Suburbs	5 June 1894	16 August 1907				Originally part of Municipal District of Ryde from 1870. Renamed Municipality of Eastwood.
Mascot	Municipality		Southern Sydney	31 October 1911	31 December 1948				Named North Botany until 31 October 1911. Merged with Botany Municipality.
Mulgoa	Municipality		Western Sydney	25 July 1893	30 June 1913				Originally part of Municipal District of Penrith from 1871. Amalgamated with Nepean Shire Council.
Nepean	Shire	Bringelly	Western Sydney	7 March 1906	31 December 1948				Split amongst Municipalities of Camden, Liverpool and Penrith.
Newtown	Municipality	Newtown	Sydney	12 December 1862	31 December 1948				Abolished and merged into City of Sydney.
North Botany	Municipality	Mascot		29 March 1888	31 October 1911				Renamed Mascot Municipality
North Willoughby	Municipality			23 October 1865	26 August 1890				Renamed Willoughby Municipality
Northcott	Municipality		Sydney	1 August 1967	1 December 1968				Renamed South Sydney Municipal Council.
Paddington	Municipality	Paddington	Sydney	17 April 1860	31 December 1948				Abolished and merged into City of Sydney.
Petersham	Municipality	Petersham	Inner West	14 December 1871	31 December 1948				Abolished and merged into Marrickville Council.
Pittwater	Municipality	Mona Vale	Northern Beaches	1 May 1992	12 May 2016	91	35	57,155 (2011)	Abolished and merged with Manly and Warringah councils to establish Northern Beaches Council.
Prospect and Sherwood	Municipality	Mays Hill Merrylands	Western Sydney	9 July 1872	10 January 1927				Renamed Municipality of Holroyd.
Redfern	Municipality	Redfern	Sydney	11 August 1859	31 December 1948				Abolished and merged into City of Sydney. The former Redfern municipal area subsequently became part of South Sydney Municipality, which was later merged into City of Sydney in 1992.
Rockdale	City		City	15 August 1888	9 September 2016				Originally named Municipality of West Botany. Merged with City of Botany Bay on 9 September 2016 to form Bayside Council
Rookwood	Municipality	Lidcombe	Western Sydney	8 December 1891	21 October 1913				Renamed Municipality of Lidcombe.
Smithfield and Fairfield	Municipality		Western Sydney	11 December 1888	26 October 1920				Renamed Municipality of Fairfield.
South Sydney	City	Erskineville	Sydney	1 December 1968	1 January 1982				Formed from Northcott Municipal Council and renamed South Sydney Municipal Council, this council was abolished in 1982 and merged into City of Sydney.
South Sydney	City	Erskineville	Sydney	1 January 1989	27 March 2004				Separated from City of Sydney in 1989, later remerged into City of Sydney in 1992.
St Leonard's	Municipality			13 May 1867	29 July 1890				Amalgamated with East St Leonard's and Victoria boroughs to form North Sydney Borough
St. Mary's	Municipality	St Marys	Western Sydney	3 March 1890	31 December 1948				Amalgamated with Penrith and Castlereagh Municipalities and part of Nepean Shire to form, Municipality of Penrith.
St Peters	Municipality	Sydenham	Inner West	13 January 1871	31 December 1948				Abolished and merged into Marrickville Council.
Vaucluse	Municipality	Vaucluse, Watsons Bay	Eastern Suburbs	1 May 1895	31 December 1948				Merged with Municipality of Woollahra.
Victoria	Municipality			20 January 1871	29 July 1890				Amalgamated with East St Leonard's and St Leonard's boroughs to form North Sydney Borough
Warringah	Shire	Dee Why	Northern Beaches	7 March 1906	12 May 2016	150	58	140,741 (2011)	Abolished and merged with Manly and Pittwater councils to establish Northern Beaches Council.
Waterloo	Municipality		Sydney	16 May 1860	31 December 1948				Separated from Municipality of Redfern in 1860. Abolished and merged into City of Sydney.
West Botany	Municipality		Southern Sydney	13 January 1871	15 August 1888				Renamed Rockdale Municipal District

==== Outer Metropolitan Sydney ====
Former LGA	Type	Council seat	Established	Abolished	Area		Popn. (year)	Notes
Former LGA	Type	Council seat	Established	Abolished	km^{2}	sq mi	Popn. (year)	Notes
Blackheath	Municipality	Blackheath	12 December 1919	1 October 1947				Originally part of Kanimbla (later Blue Mountains) Shire from 7 March 1906. Amalgamated with Katoomba City and Blue Mountains Shire to form City of Blue Mountains.
Colo	Shire	Wilberforce	7 March 1906	1 January 1981				Amalgamated with Municipality of Windsor to form Hawkesbury Shire.
Kanimbla	Shire	Katoomba	7 March 1906	23 January 1907				Renamed Blue Mountains Shire on 23 January 1907. Blue Mountains Shire was amalgamated with Katoomba City and Blackheath Municipality to form City of Blue Mountains on 1 October 1947.
Katoomba	City	Katoomba	2 November 1899	1 October 1947				Proclaimed a City on 31 May 1946. Amalgamated with Blackheath Municipality and Blue Mountains Shire to form City of Blue Mountains.
Picton	Municipality	Picton	15 March 1895	30 April 1940				Amalgamated with Wollondilly Shire on 1 May 1940.
Richmond	Municipality	Richmond	18 June 1872	31 December 1948				Amalgamated with Municipality of Windsor to form new Windsor Municipality.
Windsor	Municipality	Windsor	4 March 1871	1 January 1981				Amalgamated with Colo Shire to form Hawkesbury Shire.

=== Rural and Regional areas ===
==== Central Coast ====
Former LGA	Type	Council seat	Established	Abolished	Area		Popn. (year)	Notes
Former LGA	Type	Council seat	Established	Abolished	km^{2}	sq mi	Popn. (year)	Notes
Erina	Shire	Gosford	7 March 1906	1 January 1947				Amalgamated with Gosford Municipality and Woy Woy Shire to form Gosford Shire and Wyong Shire.
Gosford	Municipality	Gosford	10 November 1886	23 January 1908				Amalgamated with Erina Shire.
Gosford	City	Gosford	24 October 1936	12 May 2016	940	360	162,440 (2011)	Gosford Municipality separated from Erina Shire on 24 October 1936. Gosford Municipality, Erina Shire and Woy Woy Shire merged and form Gosford Shire and Wyong Shire from 1 January 1947. Gosford proclaimed a City on 1 January 1980. Abolished and merged with Wyong Shire to form Central Coast Council.
Woy Woy	Shire	Woy Woy	1 August 1928	1 January 1947				Originally part of Erina Shire from 7 March 1906. Amalgamated with Gosford Municipality and Erina Shire to form Gosford Shire and Wyong Shire.
Wyong	Shire	Wyong	1 January 1947	12 May 2016	827	319	149,746 (2011)	Abolished and merged with City of Gosford to form Central Coast Council.

==== Hunter ====
Former LGA	Type	Council seat	Established	Abolished	Area		Popn. (year)	Notes
Former LGA	Type	Council seat	Established	Abolished	km^{2}	sq mi	Popn. (year)	Notes
Adamstown	Municipality	Adamstown	31 December 1885	2 April 1938				Abolished and merged with City of Newcastle per Greater Newcastle Act 1937
Bolwarra	Shire	Largs, Lorn, North Maitland	7 March 1906	6 July 1944				Merged with Tarro Shire and part of Kearsley Shire to form Lower Hunter Shire
Carrington	Municipality	Carrington	28 March 1887	2 April 1938				Abolished and merged with City of Newcastle per Greater Newcastle Act 1937
Cessnock	Shire	Cessnock	7 March 1906	1 November 1926				Split into Cessnock Municipality and Kearsley Shire
Cessnock	Municipality	Cessnock	1 November 1926	1 January 1957				Merged with Kearsley Shire to form Municipality of Greater Cessnock
Denman	Shire	Muswellbrook	7 March 1906	1 July 1979				Named Muswellbrook Shire until 10 April 1968. Abolished and merged with the Municipality of Muswellbrook to form Muswellbrook Shire.
Dungog	Municipality	Dungog	15 May 1893	1 July 1958				Merged with Wallarobba Shire to form Dungog Shire
East Maitland	Municipality	East Maitland	10 March 1862	6 July 1944				Abolished and merged with Municipality of Morpeth and Municipality of West Maitland to create Municipality of Maitland
Greta	Municipality	Greta	2 May 1890	1 January 1934				Absorbed by Kearsley Shire
Hamilton	Municipality	Hamilton	11 December 1871	2 April 1938				Abolished and merged with City of Newcastle per Greater Newcastle Act 1937
Lambton	Municipality	Lambton	26 June 1871	2 April 1938				Abolished and merged with City of Newcastle per Greater Newcastle Act 1937
Lower Hunter	Shire		6 July 1944	1 August 1958				Abolished and split between City of Cessnock, City of Newcastle and City of Maitland
Kearsley	Shire	Cessnock	1 November 1926	1 January 1957				Merged with Municipality of Cessnock to form Municipality of Greater Cessnock
Kurri Kurri	Shire	East Maitland	7 March 1906	8 January 1907				Renamed Tarro Shire
Morpeth	Municipality	Morpeth	1 December 1865	6 July 1944				Abolished and merged with Municipality of East Maitland and Municipality of West Maitland to create Municipality of Maitland
Merewether	Municipality	Merewether	20 August 1885	2 April 1938				Abolished and merged with City of Newcastle per Greater Newcastle Act 1937
Muswellbrook	Municipality	Muswellbrook	13 April 1870	1 July 1979				Formed as Municipality of Musclebrook. Abolished and merged with Denman Shire to form Muswellbrook Shire.
New Lambton	Municipality	New Lambton	1 August 1889	2 April 1938				Abolished and merged with City of Newcastle per Greater Newcastle Act 1937
Patrick Plains	Shire	Singleton	7 March 1906	1 January 1976				Merged with Municipality of Singleton to form Singleton Shire.
Plattsburg	Municipality		27 December 1876	20 October 1915				Absorbed by Municipality of Wallsend
Raymond Terrace	Municipality	Raymond Terrace	7 July 1884	4 June 1937				Abolished and merged into Port Stephens Shire
Singleton	Municipality	Singleton	30 January 1866	1 January 1976				Merged with Patrick Plains Shire to form Singleton Shire.
South Singleton	Municipal District	Singleton	10 December 1884	13 June 1906				Amalgamated with Singleton Municipality
Stockton	Municipality	Stockton	12 October 1889	2 April 1938				Abolished and merged with City of Newcastle per Greater Newcastle Act 1937
Tarro	Shire	East Maitland	8 January 1907	6 July 1944				Originally Kurri Kurri Shire. Merged with Bolwarra Shire and part of Kearsley Shire to form Lower Hunter Shire
Wallarobba	Shire	Dungog	7 March 1906	1 July 1958				Merged with Municipality of Dungog to form Dungog Shire.
Wallsend	Municipality	Wallsend	27 February 1874	2 April 1938				Abolished and merged with City of Newcastle per Greater Newcastle Act 1937
Waratah	Municipality	Waratah	23 February 1871	2 April 1938				Abolished and merged with City of Newcastle per Greater Newcastle Act 1937
West Maitland	Municipality	West Maitland	13 November 1863	6 July 1944				Abolished and merged with Municipality of East Maitland and Municipality of Morpeth to create Municipality of Maitland
Wickham	Municipality	Wickham	25 February 1871	2 April 1938				Abolished and merged with City of Newcastle per Greater Newcastle Act 1937
Wybong	Shire	Muswellbrook	7 March 1906	6 March 1907				Renamed Muswellbrook Shire.

==== Illawarra and South Coast ====
Former LGA	Type	Council seat	Established	Abolished	Area		Popn. (year)	Notes
Former LGA	Type	Council seat	Established	Abolished	km^{2}	sq mi	Popn. (year)	Notes
Bega	Municipality	Bega	12 November 1883	1 January 1981				Abolished and merged with Mumbulla Shire and Imlay Shire to establish the Bega Shire per Local Government Areas Amalgamation Act 1980.
Berry	Municipality	Berry	4 December 1890	1 July 1948				Merged with Shire of Cambewarra, Municipality of South Shoalhaven, Municipality of Broughton's Vale, Municipality of Ulladulla, Municipality of Nowra and Clyde Shire Council to form Shoalhaven Shire
Broughton Creek and Bomaderry	Municipality	Berry	24 October 1868	4 December 1890				Renamed Berry Municipality
Broughton's Vale	Municipality		22 April 1871	1 July 1948				Merged with Shire of Cambewarra, Municipality of South Shoalhaven, Municipality of Berry, Municipality of Ulladulla, Municipality of Nowra and Clyde Shire Council to form Shoalhaven Shire
Bulli	Shire	Bulli	7 March 1906	24 September 1947				Merged with City of Wollongong, Municipality of North Illawarra and Municipality of Central Illawarra to form Municipality of Greater Wollongong
Cambewarra	Shire	Kangaroo Valley	7 March 1906	1 July 1948				Merged with Municipality of Berry, Municipality of South Shoalhaven, Municipality of Broughton Vale, Municipality of Ulladulla, Municipality of Nowra and Clyde Shire Council to form Shoalhaven Shire
Central Illawarra	Municipality	Unanderra	15 August 1859	24 September 1947				Converted to a Shire on 14 September 1934. Merged with City of Wollongong, Municipality of North Illawarra and Bulli Shire to form Municipality of Greater Wollongong
Central Shoalhaven	Municipality		7 November 1878	14 December 1895				Abolished and merged with Municipality of Numba to form Municipality of South Shoalhaven
Clyde	Shire	Tomerong	7 March 1906	1 July 1948				Merged with Municipality of Berry, Municipality of South Shoalhaven, Municipality of Broughton Vale, Municipality of Ulladulla, Municipality of Nowra and Cambewarra Shire Council to form Shoalhaven Shire
East Kiama	Municipality	Kiama	30 October 1890	16 March 1892				Renamed Kiama Borough
Gerringong	Municipality	Gerringong	24 April 1871	1 July 1954				Along with Municipality of Jamberoo, absorbed into the Municipality of Kiama
Imlay	Shire	Eden	7 March 1906	1 January 1981				Abolished and merged with Municipality of Bega and Mumbulla Shire to form Bega Valley Shire per Local Government Areas Amalgamation Act 1980.
Jamberoo	Municipality	Jamberoo	13 October 1890	1 July 1954				Originally proclaimed as Borough of Kiama. Renamed Municipality of Jamberoo on 31 March 1892 with the Borough of East Kiama renamed Municipality of Kiama on the same day. Along with Municipality of Gerringong absorbed into Municipality of Kiama
Moruya	Municipality	Moruya	17 March 1891	17 December 1913				Absorbed by Eurobodalla Shire.
Mumbulla	Shire	Bega	7 March 1906	1 January 1981				Abolished and merged with Municipality of Bega and Imlay Shire to form Bega Valley Shire per Local Government Areas Amalgamation Act 1980.
Nowra	Municipality	Nowra	29 December 1871	1 July 1948				Merged with Municipality of Berry, Municipality of South Shoalhaven, Municipality of Broughton's Vale, Municipality of Ulladulla, Cambewarra Shire and Clyde Shire to form Shoalhaven Shire
North Illawarra	Municipality		24 October 1868	24 September 1947				Merged with City of Wollongong, Shire of Central Illawarra and Bulli Shire to form Municipality of Greater Wollongong
Numba	Municipality		24 October 1868	14 December 1895				Abolished and merged with Municipality of Central Shoalhaven to form Municipality of South Shoalhaven
Shoalhaven	Municipality		21 September 1859	NK				History unknown
South Shoalhaven	Municipality		14 December 1895	1 July 1948				Merged with Municipality of Berry, Municipality of Nowra, Municipality of Broughton Vale, Municipality of Ulladulla, Cambewarra Shire and Clyde Shire to form Shoalhaven Shire
Ulladulla	Municipality	Ulladulla	14 April 1874	1 July 1948				Abolished and merged with municipalities of Berry, Nowra, Broughton's Vale, South Shoalhaven and shires of Cambewarra and Clyde to form Shoalhaven Shire (now City of Shoalhaven).

==== Mid North Coast ====
Former LGA	Type	Council seat	Established	Abolished	Area		Popn. (year)	Notes
Former LGA	Type	Council seat	Established	Abolished	km^{2}	sq mi	Popn. (year)	Notes
Coffs Harbour	Shire	Coffs Harbour	1 January 1957	1 September 1987				Abolished to create City of Coffs Harbour.
Dorrigo	Shire	Dorrigo	7 March 1906	1 January 1957				Split between Bellingen Shire and the newly created Coff's Harbour Shire
Gloucester	Shire	Gloucester	7 March 1906	12 May 2016	2,952	1,140	4,877 (2011)	Abolished and merged with City of Greater Taree and Great Lakes Council to establish Mid-Coast Council.
Great Lakes	Municipality	Forster	25 July 1971	12 May 2016	3,376	1,303	34,430 (2011)	Abolished and merged with City of Greater Taree and Gloucester Shire to establish Mid-Coast Council.
Hastings	Shire	Wauchope	7 March 1906	1 January 1981				Merged with Municipality of Port Macquarie to form Municipality of Hastings per Local Government Areas Amalgamation Act 1980
Hastings	Municipality	Port Macquarie	1 January 1981	22 July 2005				Renamed Port Macquarie-Hastings Council
Kempsey	Municipality	Kempsey	11 June 1886	1 October 1975				Merged with Macleay Shire to form Kempsey Shire.
Macleay	Shire	Kempsey	7 March 1906	1 October 1975				Merged with Municipality of Kempsey to form Kempsey Shire.
Manning	Shire	Taree	7 March 1906	1 January 1981				Split per Local Government Areas Amalgamation Act 1980; part merged with Municipality of Taree and Municipality of Wingham to form City of Greater Taree, balance absorbed by Great Lakes Shire.
Nambucca	Shire	Bowraville	15 December 1915	6 December 2019				Renamed Nambucca Valley Council
Port Macquarie	Municipality	Port Macquarie	14 March 1887	1 January 1981				Merged with Hastings Shire to form Hastings Municipality
Stroud	Shire	Stroud	7 March 1906	25 July 1971				Renamed Great Lakes Shire
Taree	City	Taree	26 March 1885	12 May 2016	3,730	1,440	46,541 (2011)	Taree Municipality created 26 March 1885. Abolished and merged with Great Lakes Council and Gloucester Shire to establish Mid-Coast Council.
Wingham	Municipality	Wingham	26 June 1889	1 January 1981				Merged with Taree Municipality and part of Manning Shire to form Greater Taree City

==== Northern Rivers ====
Former LGA	Type	Council seat	Established	Abolished	Area		Popn. (year)	Notes
Former LGA	Type	Council seat	Established	Abolished	km^{2}	sq mi	Popn. (year)	Notes
Ballina	Municipality	Ballina	4 June 1883	1 January 1977				Merged with Tintenbar Shire to form Ballina Shire.
Casino	Municipality	Casino	14 January 1880	21 February 2000				Abolished and merged with Richmond River Shire to form Richmond Valley Council
Copmanhurst	Shire	Grafton	7 March 1906	24 August 2004				Split; part merged with Maclean Shire, City of Grafton and Pristine Waters Shire to form Clarence Valley Council, balance merged with Richmond River Council.
Coraki	Municipality	Coraki	2 April 1891	1 January 1934				Absorbed by Woodburn Shire.
Grafton	Municipality	Grafton	19 July 1859	25 February 2004				Proclaimed a city per the Crown Lands Act 1884. Merged with Maclean Shire, Copmanhurst Shire and Pristine Waters Shire to form Clarence Valley Council
Gundurimba	Shire	Lismore	7 March 1906	1 January1977				Abolished and merged with Terania Shire into City of Lismore.
Harwood	Shire	Maclean	7 March 1906	1 January 1957				Merged with Municipality of Maclean to form Maclean Shire.
Maclean	Municipality	Maclean	28 December 1887	1 January 1957				Merged with Harwood Shire and part of Orara Shire to form Maclean Shire.
Maclean	Shire	Maclean	1 January 1957	25 February 2004				Merged with Copmanhurst Shire, City of Grafton and Pristine Waters Shire to form Clarence Valley Council.
Mullumbimby	Municipality	Mullumbimby	1 July 1908	1 January 1980				Absorbed by Byron Shire.
Murwillumbah	Municipality	Murwillumbah	25 May 1902	1 January 1947				Abolished and merged with Shire of Tweed to establish Tweed Shire.
Nymboida	Shire	South Grafton	6 August 1913	1 July 2000				Merged with Ulmarra Shire to form Pristine Waters Shire
Orara	Shire	South Grafton	7 March 1906	1 January 1959				Split; part absorbed along with Municipality of South Grafton and parts of Copmanhurst Shire into City of Grafton, part merged with Municipality of Maclean to form Maclean Shire, part merged with Municipality of Ulmarra to form Ulmarra Shire.
Pristine Waters	Shire		1 July 2000	25 February 2004				Split; part merged with Copmanhurst Shire, Maclean Shire and City of Grafton to create Clarence Valley Council, balance merged with Coffs Harbour City.
Richmond River	Shire	Casino	1 January 1976	21 February 2000				Abolished and merged with Municipality of Casino to form Richmond Valley Council.
South Grafton	Municipality	South Grafton	11 November 1896	1 January 1957				Absorbed into City of Grafton
Terania	Shire	Lismore	7 March 1906	1 January 1977				Abolished and merged with Gundurimba Shire into City of Lismore.
Tintenbar	Shire	Alstonville	7 March 1906	1 January 1977				Merged with Municipality of Ballina to form Ballina Shire.
Tomki	Shire	Casino	7 March 1906	1 January 1976				Split; part absorbed by Municipality of Casino and part merged with Woodburn Shire to form Richmond River Shire.
Ulmarra	Municipality	Ulmarra	16 November 1871	1 January 1957				Merged with part of Orara Shire to form Ulmarra Shire
Ulmarra	Shire	Ulmarra	1 January 1957	1 July 2000				Merged with Nymboida Shire to form Pristine Waters Shire
Woodburn	Shire	Coraki	7 March 1906	1 January 1976				Merged with part of Tomki Shire to form Richmond River Shire.

==== Upper Hunter ====
Former LGA	Former type	Former council seat	Established	Abolished	Area		Popn. (year)	Notes
Former LGA	Former type	Former council seat	Established	Abolished	km^{2}	sq mi	Popn. (year)	Notes
Aberdeen	Municipality	Aberdeen	18 December 1894	7 October 1937				Abolished and merged into Upper Hunter Shire.
Merriwa	Shire	Merriwa	7 March 1906	26 May 2004				Abolished and merged with the recently created Upper Hunter Shire, with a small part of the former shire added to Mid-Western Regional Council.
Murrurundi	Municipality	Murrurundi	5 March 1890	1 October 1948				Merged with Warrah Shire to form Murrurundi Shire
Murrurundi	Shire	Murrurundi	1 October 1948	17 March 2004				Abolished and split between Upper Hunter and Liverpool Plains Shires.
Scone	Municipality	Scone	10 July 1888	1 January 1958				Merged with Woolooma Shire to form Scone Shire.
Scone	Shire	Scone	1 January 1958	17 March 2004				Abolished and merged with part of Murrurundi Shire to form Upper Hunter Shire
Upper Hunter	Shire	Scone	11 April 1917	1 January 1958				Previously named Woolooma Shire. Merged with Scone Municipality to form Scone Shire
Warrah	Shire	Murrurundi	7 March 1906	1 October 1948				Merged with Municipality of Murrurundi to form Murrurundi Shire
Woolooma	Shire	Scone	7 March 1906	11 April 1917				Spelling changed from Wooluma on 13 February 1907. Renamed Upper Hunter Shire

==== New England ====
Former LGA	Type	Council seat	Established	Abolished	Area		Popn. (year)	Notes
Former LGA	Type	Council seat	Established	Abolished	km^{2}	sq mi	Popn. (year)	Notes
Apsley	Shire	Walcha	7 March 1906	1 June 1955				Abolished and merged with Municipality of Walcha to form Walcha Shire
Armidale	City	Armidale	13 November 1863	21 February 2000				Merged with Dumaresq Shire to form Armidale Dumaresq Council.
Armidale Dumaresq	Shire	Armidale	21 February 2000	12 May 2016	4,235	1,635	24,105 (2011)	Abolished and merged with Guyra Shire to establish Armidale Regional Council.
Barraba	Municipality	Barraba	23 May 1906	1 November 1953				Absorbed by Barraba Shire.
Barraba	Shire	Barraba	19 May 1906	17 March 2004	3,069	1,185	2,185 (2004)	Abolished and split between Guyra Shire and Tamworth Regional Council.
Bingara	Municipality	Bingara	27 March 1889	1 January 1944				Merged with Gwydir Shire to form Bingara Shire.
Bingara	Shire	Bingara	1 January 1944	17 March 2004	2,854	1,102	2,029 (2004)	Abolished and split between Guyra and Yallaroi Shires.
Cockburn	Shire	Tamworth	7 March 1906	1 January 1976				Abolished and merged with Peel Shire to establish Parry Shire.
Dumaresq	Shire		7 March 1906	21 February 2000				Merged with City of Armidale to form Armidale Dumaresq Council.
Glen Innes	Municipality	Glen Innes	17 June 1872	15 September 2004				Merged with Severn Shire to form Glen Innes Severn Council
Gostwyck	Shire	Uralla	7 March 1906	1 January 1948				Merged with Municipality of Uralla to form Uralla Shire
Guyra	Shire	Guyra	7 March 1906	12 May 2016	4,395	1,697	4,397 (2011)	Abolished and merged with Armidale Dumaresq Shire to establish Armidale Regional Council.
Gwydir	Shire	Bingara	7 March 1906	1 January 1944				Merged with Municipality of Bingara to form Bingara Shire.
Hillgrove	Municipality	Hillgrove	13 February 1900	1 January 1924				Absorbed by Dumaresq Shire
Koreelah	Shire	Tenterfield	7 March 1906	13 February 1907				Renamed Tenterfield Shire
Mandowa	Shire	Manilla	7 March 1906	1 January 1960				Merged with Municipality of Manilla to form Manilla Shire.
Manilla	Municipality	Manilla	11 June 1901	1 January 1960				Merged with Mandowa Shire to form Manilla Shire.
Manilla	Shire	Manilla	1 January 1960	17 March 2004				Merged with City of Tamworth, Nundle Shire and parts of Parry Shire and Barraba Shire to form Tamworth Regional Council.
Nundle	Shire	Nundle	7 March 1906	17 March 2004				Merged with City of Tamworth, Manilla Shire and parts of Parry Shire and Barraba Shire to form Tamworth Regional Council.
Parry	Shire	Tamworth	1 January 1976	17 March 2004				Abolished and split between Tamworth Regional Council and the Liverpool Plains Shire.
Peel	Shire	Tamworth	7 March 1906	1 January 1976				Abolished and merged with Cockburn Shire to establish Parry Shire.
Peel	Regional Council	Tamworth	17 March 2004	2 April 2004				Renamed Tamworth Regional Council
Severn	Shire	Glen Innes	7 March 1906	15 September 2004				Split; part absorbed by Tenterfield Shire, balance merged with Municipality of Glen Innes to form Glen Innes Severn Council.
Tamworth	City	Tamworth	17 March 1876	17 March 2004				Merged with Manilla Shire and parts of Nundle and Parry Shires to form Peel Regional Council
Tenterfield	Municipality	Tenterfield	22 November 1871	1 January 1975				Abolished and merged into Tenterfield Shire
Uralla	Municipality	Uralla	24 April 1882	1 January 1948				Merged with Gostwyck Shire to form Uralla Shire
Walcha	Municipality	Walcha	12 March 1889	1 June 1955				Abolished and merged with Apsley Shire to form Walcha Shire
Yallaroi	Shire	Warialda	7 March 1906	17 March 2004	5,340	2,060	4,279 (2004)	Abolished and merged with Bingara and part of Barraba Shires to establish Guyra Shire.

==== North West ====
Former LGA	Type	Council seat	Established	Abolished	Area		Popn. (year)	Notes
Former LGA	Type	Council seat	Established	Abolished	km^{2}	sq mi	Popn. (year)	Notes
Ashford	Shire	Ashford	7 March 1906	1 July 1979				Abolished and merged with Municipality of Inverell and Macintyre Shire to form Inverell Shire
Bannockburn	Shire	Inverell	7 March 1906	15 November 1940				Abolished and absorbed into Macintyre Shire.
Boolooroo	Shire	Moree	7 March 1906	1 January 1981				Abolished and merged with Boomi Shire and Moree Council to establish Moree Plains Shire per Local Government Areas Amalgamation Act 1980.
Boomi	Shire	Moree	7 March 1906	1 January 1981				Abolished and merged with Boolooroo Shire and Moree Council to establish Moree Plains Shire per Local Government Areas Amalgamation Act 1980.
Brewarrina	Municipality	Brewarrina	12 January 1901	1 January 1955				Boundaries extended and converted into Brewarrina Shire
Coonamble	Municipality	Coonamble	3 May 1880	1 May 1952				Merged with Wingadee Shire to form Coonamble Shire.
Gunnedah	Municipality	Gunnedah	17 September 1885	1 January 1980				Merged with Liverpool Plains Shire to form Gunnedah Shire.
Inverell	Municipality	Inverell	5 March 1872	1 July 1979				Abolished and merged with Ashford Shire and Macintyre Shire to form Inverell Shire.
Liverpool Plains	Shire	Gunnedah	7 March 1906	1 January 1980				Merged with Municipality of Gunnedah to form Gunnedah Shire.
Macintyre	Shire	Inverell	7 March 1906	1 July 1979				Merged with Municipality of Inverell and Ashford Shire to form Inverell Shire.
Marthaguy	Shire	Warren	7 March 1906	1 January 1957				Merged with the Municipality of Warren to form Warren Shire.
Moree	Municipality	Moree	3 December 1890	1 January 1981				Abolished and merged with Boomi Shire and Boolooroo Shire to establish Moree Plains Shire per Local Government Areas Amalgamation Act 1980.
Namoi	Shire	Narrabri	7 March 1906	1 January 1981				Abolished and merged with Municipality of Narrabri to form Narrabri Shire per Local Government Areas Amalgamation Act 1980.
Narrabri	Municipality	Narrabri	5 September 1883	1 January 1981				Abolished and merged with Namoi Shire to establish Narrabri Shire per Local Government Areas Amalgamation Act 1980.
Nyngan	Municipality	Nyngan	16 February 1891	1 January 1972				Absorbed by Bogan Shire
Quirindi	Municipality	Quirindi	24 December 1890	1 January 1981				Abolished and merged with Tamarang Shire to establish Quirindi Shire per Local Government Areas Amalgamation Act 1980.
Quirindi	Shire	Quirindi	1 January 1981	17 March 2004				Abolished and merged with parts of Murrurundi, Nundle and Parry shires to form Liverpool Plains Council
Tamarang	Shire	Quirindi	7 March 1906	1 January 1981				Abolished and merged with Quirindi Municipality to establish Quirindi Shire per Local Government Areas Amalgamation Act 1980.
Warren	Municipality	Warren	24 April 1895	1 January 1957				Merged with the Municipality of Warren to form Warren Shire.
Warialda	Municipality	Warialda	13 March 1900	1 January 1925				Absorbed by Yallaroi Shire.
West Narrabri	Municipality	West Narrabri	28 September 1895	13 July 1937				Abolished and merged into Namoi Shire
Wingadee	Shire	Coonamble	7 March 1906	1 May 1952				Merged with Municipality of Coonamble to form Coonamble Shire.

==== Central West / Orana ====
Former LGA	Type	Council seat	Established	Abolished	Area		Popn. (year)	Notes
Former LGA	Type	Council seat	Established	Abolished	km^{2}	sq mi	Popn. (year)	Notes
Abercrombie	Shire	Perthville, Rockley	7 March 1906	1 October 1977				Abolished and along with City of Bathurst and Turon Shire divided into City of Bathurst and Evans Shire.
Amaroo	Shire	Molong	7 March 1906	1 January 1951				Abolished and merged with Municipality of Molong to form Molong Shire.
Bathurst	City	Bathurst	13 November 1862	26 May 2004				Merged with most of Evans Shire to form Bathurst Regional Council
Blaxland	Shire	Lithgow, Wallerawang	7 March 1906	1 April 1977				Merged with Lithgow City to from Greater Lithgow City
Blayney	Municipality	Blayney	31 October 1882	12 November 1935				Absorbed along with Municipality of Carcoar into Lyndhurst Shire.
Boree	Shire	Cudal	7 March 1906	1 October 1977				Merged with Canobolas Shire, Molong Shire and part of Lyndhurst Shire to form Cabonne Shire
Canobolas	Shire	Orange	7 March 1906	1 October 1977				Merged with Boree Shire, Molong Shire and part of Lyndhurst Shire to form Cabonne Shire
Carcoar	Municipality	Carcoar	11 November 1878	12 November 1935				Absorbed along with Municipality of Blayney into Lyndhurst Shire.
Cobbora	Shire	Geurie	7 March 1906	1 January 1950				Split; part merged with Municipality of Wellington and Macquarie Shire to form Wellington Shire, part absorbed into Gulgong Shire
Coolah	Shire	Coolah	7 March 1906	25 August 2004				Abolished and merged with Coonabarabran Shire to establish Warrumbungle Shire.
Coonabarabran	Shire	Coonabarabran	7 March 1906	25 August 2004				Abolished and merged with Coolah Shire to establish Warrumbungle Shire.
Cowra	Municipality	Cowra	8 May 1888	1 January 1981				Abolished and merged with Waugoola Shire to establish Cowra Shire per Local Government Areas Amalgamation Act 1980.
Cudal	Municipality	Cudal	20 October 1890	24 December 1912				Absorbed by Boree Shire.
Cudgegong	Municipality	Cudgegong	20 July 1860	2 May 1924				Merged with Meroo Shire to form Cudgegong Shire.
Cudgegong	Shire	Cudgegong	2 May 1924	1 July 1975				Absorbed by Mudgee Shire
Dubbo	City	Dubbo	19 February 1872	12 May 2016	3,425	1,322	41,211 (2011)	Abolished and merged with Wellington Council to establish Western Plains Regional Council, which was renamed Dubbo Regional Council.
East Orange	Municipality	Orange	29 March 1888	24 December 1912				Merged into Orange Municipality
Evans	Shire	Kelso	1 October 1977	26 May 2004	4,284	1,654		Abolished and split between Bathurst Regional, Oberon and Lithgow councils.
Forbes	Municipality	Forbes	27 April 1870	1 January1981				Abolished and merged with Jemalong Shire to establish Forbes Shire per Local Government Areas Amalgamation Act 1980.
Goobang	Shire	Parkes	7 March 1906	1 January 1981				Abolished and merged with Municipality of Parkes to form Parkes Shire per Local Government Areas Amalgamation Act 1980.
Grenfell	Municipality	Grenfell	3 May 1883	1 July 1975				Absorbed by Weddin Shire.
Gulgong	Municipality	Gulgong	5 February 1876	1 January 1941				Merged with Wyaldra Shire to form Gulgong Shire .
Gulgong	Shire	Gulgong	1 January 1941	1 January 1957				Absorbed by Cudgegong and Coolah shires
Hill End	Municipality	Hill End	6 August 1873	17 June 1908				Absorbed by Turon Shire.
Jemalong	Shire	Forbes	7 March 1906	1 January 1981				Abolished and merged with Municipality of Forbes to form Forbes Shire per Local Government Areas Amalgamation Act 1980.
Lyndhurst	Shire	Blayney	7 March 1906	1 October 1977				Split; part absorbed by City of Orange, part merged with Boree Shire, Canobolas Shire and Molong Shire to form Cabonne Shire, the balance constituted as Blayney Shire.
Macquarie	Shire	Wellington	7 March 1906	1 January 1950				Merged with Municipality of Wellington and part of Cobbora Shire to form Wellington Shire
Meroo	Shire	Mudgee	7 March 1906	2 May 1924				Merged with Municipality of Cudgegong to form Cudgegong Shire.
Molong	Municipality	Molong	13 November 1878	1 January 1951				Abolished and merged with Amaroo Shire to form Molong Shire.
Molong	Shire	Molong	1 January 1951	1 January 1977				Merged with Canobolas Shire, Boree Shire and part of Lyndhurst Shire to form Cabonne Shire
Mudgee	Municipality	Mudgee	21 February 1860	1 July 1975				Merged with Cudgegong Shire to form Mudgee Shire
Mudgee	Shire	Mudgee	1 July 1975	26 May 2004				Merged with parts of Coolah Shire, Rylstone Shire and Merriwa Shire to form Mid-Western Regional Council.
Narromine	Municipality	Narromine	22 April 1898	1 January 1981				Abolished and merged with Timbrebongie Shire to establish Narromine Shire per Local Government Areas Amalgamation Act 1980.
Parkes	Municipality	Parkes	28 February 1883	1 January 1981				Abolished and merged with Goobang Shire to establish Parkes Shire per Local Government Areas Amalgamation Act 1980.
Peak Hill	Municipality	Peak Hill	7 November 1894	1 November 1971				Absorbed by Goobang Shire.
Rylstone	Shire	Rylstone	7 March 1906	26 May 2004				Split; part merged with parts of Coolah Shire, Mudgee Shire and Merriwa Shire to form Mid-Western Regional Council, part absorbed by City of Lithgow.
Talbragar	Shire	Dubbo	7 March 1906	1 March 1980				Absorbed into City of Dubbo.
Timbregongie	Shire	Narromine	7 March 1906	1 January 1981				Abolished and merged with Municipality of Narromine to form Narromine Shire per Local Government Areas Amalgamation Act 1980.
Turon	Shire	Kelso	7 March 1906	1 October 1977				Abolished and merged with Abercrombie Shire to establish Evans Shire.
Waugoola	Shire	Cowra	7 March 1906	1 January 1981				Abolished and merged with Municipality of Cowra to form Cowra Shire per Local Government Areas Amalgamation Act 1980.
Wellington	Municipality	Wellington	13 May 1879	1 January 1950				Abolished and merged with Macquarie Shire and part of Cobbora Shire to form Wellington Shire
Wellington	Shire	Wellington	1 January 1950	12 May 2016	4,113	1,588	8,493 (2011)	Abolished and merged with City of Dubbo to establish Dubbo Regional Council.
Western Plains	Regional Council	Dubbo	12 May 2016	7 September 2016				Renamed Dubbo Regional Council
Wyaldra	Shire	Gulgong	7 March 1906	1 January 1941				Abolished and merged with Gulgong Municipality.

==== Southern Highlands / Monaro ====
Former LGA	Type	Council seat	Established	Abolished	Area		Popn. (year)	Notes
Former LGA	Type	Council seat	Established	Abolished	km^{2}	sq mi	Popn. (year)	Notes
Bibbenluke	Shire	Bombala	7 March 1906	1 October 1977				Merged with Municipality of Bombala to form Bombala Shire.
Bombala	Municipality	Bombala	26 November 1890	1 October 1977				Merged with Bibbenluke Shire to form Bombala Shire.
Bombala	Shire	Bombala	1 October 1977	12 May 2016	3,945	1,523	2,401 (2013)	Abolished and merged with Cooma-Monaro and Snowy River shires to establish Snowy Monaro Regional Council.
Bowral	Municipality	Bowral	17 February 1886	1 January 1981				Abolished and merged with Mittagong Shire and Wingecarribee Shire to establish Wingecarribee Shire per Local Government Areas Amalgamation Act 1980.
Cooma	Municipality	Cooma	6 November 1879	1 January 1981				Abolished and merged with Monaro Shire to establish Cooma-Monaro Shire per Local Government Areas Amalgamation Act 1980.
Cooma-Monaro	Shire	Cooma	1 January 1981	12 May 2016	8,738	3,374	10,073 (2013)	Abolished and merged with Bombala and Snowy River shires to establish Snowy Monaro Regional Council.
Dalgety	Shire	Berridale	7 March 1906	16 August 1939				Renamed Snowy River Shire
Eastern Capital City	Regional Council	Braidwood	11 February 2004	10 December 2004				Renamed Palerang Municipality
Goulburn	City	Goulburn	4 June 1859	11 February 2004				Merged with Mulwaree Shire to form Greater Argyle Council
Greater Argyle	Council	Goulburn	11 February 2004	22 October 2004				Renamed Goulburn Mulwaree Council
Gunning	Shire	Gunning	7 March 1906	2 November 2004				Split on 11 February 2004; part merged with Tallaganda Shire and parts of Mulwaree Shire, Yarrowlumla Shire and Gunning Shire to form Palerang Council, part merged with Crookwell Shire and parts of Mulwaree Shire and Yass Shire to form Upper Lachlan Shire part merged with Tallaganda Shire and parts of Yarrowlumla Shire and Mulwaree Shire to form Palerang Council.
Mittagong	Municipality	Mittagong	24 July 1889	1 January 1939				Merged into Nattai Shire
Mittagong	Shire	Mittagong	2 March 1949	1 January 1981				Originally named Nattai Shire. Abolished and merged with Municipality of Bowral and Wingecarribee Shire to form Wingecarribee Shire per Local Government Areas Amalgamation Act 1980.
Monaro	Shire	Cooma	7 March 1906	1 January 1981				Abolished and merged with Municipality of Cooma to form Cooma-Monaro Shire per Local Government Areas Amalgamation Act 1980.
Moss Vale	Municipality	Moss Vale	14 September 1888	10 February 1933				Absorbed by Wingecarribee Shire.
Mulwaree	Shire	Goulburn	7 March 1906	11 February 2004				Split; part merged with City of Goulburn to form Goulburn Mulwaree Council, part merged with Tallaganda Shire and parts of Yarrowlumla Shire and Gunning Shire to form Palerang Council, part merged with Crookwell Shire and parts of Gunning Shire and Yass Shire to form Upper Lachlan Shire.
Nattai	Shire	Mittagong	7 March 1906	2 March 1949				Renamed Mittagong Shire
Palerang	Municipality	Bungendore	10 December 2004	12 May 2016	5,134	1,982	15,306 (2013)	Originally named Eastern Capital City Regional Council. Abolished and merged with Queanbeyan City to establish Queanbeyan–Palerang Regional Council.
Queanbeyan	City	Queanbeyan	25 February 1885	12 May 2016	172	66	40,568 (2013)	Abolished and merged with Palerang Council to establish Queanbeyan–Palerang Regional Council.
Snowy River	Shire	Berridale	7 March 1906	12 May 2016	6,030	2,330	8,087 (2013)	Abolished and merged with Cooma-Monaro and Bombala shires to establish Snowy Monaro Regional Council.
Tallaganda	Shire	Braidwood	7 March 1906	11 February 2004				Merged with parts of Yarrowlumla Shire, Mulwaree Shire and Gunning Shire to form Eastern Capital City Regional Council.
Yarrowlumla	Shire	Queanbeyan	7 March 1906	11 February 2004	2,971	1,147	9,654 (1999)	Most of the Australian Capital Territory was contained within Yarrowlumla Shire before it was subsumed by the Commonwealth of Australia in 1909. Yarrowlumla was abolished in 2004 and its area split between Palerang, Yass Valley, Queanbeyan City councils and Cooma-Monaro Shire.

==== South West Slopes ====
Former LGA	Type	Council seat	Established	Abolished	Area		Popn. (year)	Notes
Former LGA	Type	Council seat	Established	Abolished	km^{2}	sq mi	Popn. (year)	Notes
Boorowa	Shire	Boorowa	1 September 1944	12 May 2016	2,579	996	2,558 (2013)	Abolished and merged with Harden and Young shires to establish Hilltops Council.
Burrangong	Shire	Young	7 March 1906	1 July 1980				Merged with Municipality of Young to form Young Shire
Burrowa	Municipality	Boorowa	8 December 1888	1 September 1944				Merged with Murrungal Shire to form Boorowa Shire.
Crookwell	Shire	Crookwell	7 March 1906	11 February 2004				Merged with parts of Gunning Shire, Mulwaree Shire and Yass Shire to form Upper Lachlan Shire
Demondrille	Shire	Murrumburrah	7 March 1906	1 January 1975				Merged with Municipality of Murrumburrah to form Harden Shire.
Goodradigbee	Shire	Yass	7 March 1906	1 January 1980				Merged with Municipality of Yass to form Yass Shire.
Harden	Shire	Harden	1 January 1975	12 May 2016	1,869	722	3,584 (2011)	Abolished and merged with Boorowa and Young shires to establish Hilltops Council.
Murrungal	Shire	Boorowa	7 March 1906	1 September 1944				Merged with Municipality of Burrowa to form Boorowa Shire.
Murrumburrah	Municipality	Murrumburrah	25 February 1890	1 January 1975				Merged with Demondrille Shire to form Harden Shire.
Yass	Municipality	Yass	12 March 1873	1 January 1980				Abolished and merged with Goodradigbee Shire to establish Yass Shire.
Yass	Shire	Yass	1 January 1980	11 February 2004				Abolished and merged with parts of Gunning and Yarrowlumla shires to establish Yass Valley Council.
Young	Municipality	Young	3 August 1882	1 July 1980				Merged with Burrangong Shire to form Young Shire
Young	Shire	Young	1 July 1980	12 May 2016			12,236 (2011)	Abolished and merged with the Boorowa and Harden shires to establish Hilltops Council.

==== Riverina / Murray ====
Former LGA	Type	Council seat	Established	Abolished	Area		Popn. (year)	Notes
Former LGA	Type	Council seat	Established	Abolished	km^{2}	sq mi	Popn. (year)	Notes
Adjungbilly	Shire	Gundagai	7 March 1906	1 January 1924				Abolished and merged with Municipality of Gundagai to form Gundagai Shire.
Balranald	Municipality	Balranald	27 September 1882	1 January 1957				Land added and merged with part of Wakool Shire to form Balranald Shire
Conargo	Shire	Deniliquin	7 March 1906	12 May 2016	8,738	3,374	1,577 (2012)	Abolished and merged with the Deniliquin Council to establish Edward River Council.
Condobolin	Municipality	Condobolin	20 May 1890	1 April 1977				Named Condoublin Municipality until 16 February 1949. Absorbed by Lachlan Shire.
Cootamundra	Municipality	Cootamundra	20 May 1884	1 April 1975				Established as Borough of Cootamundra. Merged with Jindalee Shire to form Cootamundra Shire.
Cootamundra	Shire	Cootamundra	1 April 1975	12 May 2016	2,457	949	3,747 (2011)	Abolished and merged with Gundagai Shire to establish Cootamundra–Gundagai Regional Council.
Coreen	Shire	Corowa	7 March 1906	1 July 1955				Abolished and merged with Municipality of Corowa to establish Corowa Shire.
Corowa	Municipality	Corowa	19 June 1903	1 July 1955				Abolished and merged with Coreen Shire to establish Corowa Shire.
Corowa	Shire	Corowa	1 July 1955	12 May 2016	2,329	899	11,383 (2012)	Abolished and merged with Urana Shire to establish Federation Council.
Cowcumballa	Shire	Cootamundra	7 March 1906	13 March 1907				Renamed Jindalee Shire
Culcairn	Shire	Culcairn	7 March 1906	26 May 2004				Merged with Holbrook Shire and part of Hume Shire to form Greater Hume Shire.
Deniliquin	Municipality	Deniliquin	14 November 1865	12 May 2016	51	20	7,327 (2012)	Abolished and merged with Conargo Shire to establish Edward River Council.
Gadara	Shire	Tumut	7 March 1906	1 July 1928				Originally named Yarrangobilly Shire. Merged with Municipality of Tumut to form Tumut Shire.
Germanton	Shire	Holbrook	7 March 1906	5 August 1915				Renamed Holbrook Shire
Gundagai	Municipality	Gundagai	15 August 1889	1 January 1924				Abolished and merged with Adjungbilly Shire to form Gundagai Shire.
Gundagai	Shire	Gundagai	1 January 1924	7 September 2016	2,457	949	3,747 (2013)	Renamed Cootamundra–Gundagai Regional Council after merging with Cootamundra Shire on 12 May 2016.
Hay	Municipality	Hay	10 June 1872	1 January 1965				Merged with Waradgery Shire to form Hay Shire
Hillston	Municipality	Hillston	8 December 1888	15 November 1943				Absorbed by Carrathool Shire
Holbrook	Shire	Holbrook	5 August 1915	26 May 2004				Originally named Germanton Shire. Split; part absorbed by Tumbarumba Shire, balance merged with Culcairn Shire and part of Hume Shire to form Greater Hume Shire.
Hume	Shire	Albury	7 March 1906	26 May 2004				Split; part absorbed by City of Albury, part absorbed by Corowa Shire, balance merged with Culcairn Shire and Holbrook Shire to form Greater Hume Shire.
Illabo	Shire	Junee	7 March 1906	1 January 1981				Abolished and merged with Municipality of Junee to form Junee Shire per Local Government Areas Amalgamation Act 1980.
Jerilderie	Municipality	Jerilderie	4 November 1889	13 December 1918				Abolished and merged with Wunnamurra Shire to establish Jerilderie Shire.
Jerilderie	Shire	Jerilderie	13 December 1918	12 May 2016	3,373	1,302	1,526 (2011)	Abolished and merged with the Murrumbidgee Shire to establish Murrumbidgee Council.
Jindalee	Shire	Cootamundra	13 March 1907	1 April 1975				Originally named Cowcumballa Shire. Abolished and merged into Cootamundra Shire
Junee	Municipality	Junee	27 June 1886	1 January 1981				Abolished and merged with Illabo Shire to establish Junee Shire per Local Government Areas Amalgamation Act 1980.
Kyeamba	Shire	Wagga Wagga	7 March 1906	1 January 1981				Absorbed along with Mitchell Shire into City of Wagga Wagga per Local Government Areas Amalgamation Act 1980
Mitchell	Shire	Wagga Wagga	7 March 1906	1 January 1981				Absorbed along with Kyeamba Shire into City of Wagga Wagga per Local Government Areas Amalgamation Act 1980.
Moama	Municipality	Moama	29 December 1890	1 January 1953				Absorbed by Murray Shire.
Murray	Shire	Mathoura	7 March 1906	12 May 2016	4,345	1,678	7,312 (2011)	Abolished and merged with Wakool Shire to establish Murray River Council.
Murrumbidgee	Shire	Darlington Point	7 March 1906	12 May 2016	3,508	1,354	2,415 (2012)	Abolished and merged with Jerilderie Shire to establish Murrumbidgee Council.
Narraburra	Shire	Temora	7 March 1906	1 January 1981				Abolished and merged with Municipality of Temora to form Temora Shire per Local Government Areas Amalgamation Act 1980.
Narrandera	Municipality	Narrandera	17 March 1885	1 January 1960				Merged with Yanko Shire to form Narrandera Shire.
Temora	Municipality	Temora	22 December 1891	1 January 1981				Abolished and merged with Narraburra Shire to establish Temora Shire per Local Government Areas Amalgamation Act 1980.
Tumbarumba	Shire	Tumbarumba	7 March 1906	12 May 2016	4,393	1,696	3,521 (2013)	Abolished and merged with Tumut Shire to establish Snowy Valleys Council.
Tumut	Municipality	Tumut	27 April 1887	1 July 1928				Merged with Gadara Shire to form Tumut Shire.
Tumut	Shire	Tumut	1 July 1928	12 May 2016	4,566	1,763	11,316 (2013)	Abolished and merged with Tumbarumba Shire to establish Snowy Valleys Council.
Urana	Shire	Urana	7 March 1906	12 May 2016	3,356	1,296	1,180 (2012)	Abolished and merged with Corowa Shire to establish Federation Council.
Wade	Shire	Griffith	6 January 1928	1 January 1982				Formed from Mirrool No.1 Irrigation Area. Renamed Griffith Shire
Wakool	Shire	Moulamein	7 March 1906	12 May 2016	7,521	2,904	4,033 (2012)	Abolished and merged with Murray Shire to establish Murray River Council.
Wallendbeen	Municipality	Wallendbeen	21 May 1892	17 September 1935				Abolished and split; part to Jindalee Shire, part to Demondrille Shire.
Waradgery	Shire	Hay	7 March 1906	1 January 1965				Merged with Municipality of Hay to form Hay Shire.
Warialda	Municipality	Warialda	13 March 1900	1 January 1925				Absorbed by Yallaroi Shire.
Willandra	Shire	Goolgowi	7 March 1906	13 February 1907				Renamed Carrathool Shire
Willimbong	Shire	Leeton	6 January 1928	10 July 1946				Formed from Yanco No.1 Irrigation Area. Renamed Leeton Shire
Windouran	Shire	Pretty Pine	7 March 1906	1 July 2001				Absorbed into Conargo Shire
Wunnamurra	Shire	Jerilderie	7 March 1906	13 December 1918				Abolished and merged with Municipality of Jerilderie to form Jerilderie Shire.
Wyalong	Municipality	Wyalong	22 December 1899	1 October 1935				Abolished and merged with Bland Shire
Yanko	Shire	Narrandera	7 March 1906	1 January 1960				Merged with Municipality of Narrandera to form Narrandera Shire.
Yarrangobilly	Shire	Tumut	7 March 1906	13 February 1907				Renamed Gadara Shire

==== Far West ====
Former LGA	Type	Council seat	Established	Abolished	Area		Popn. (year)	Notes
Former LGA	Type	Council seat	Established	Abolished	km^{2}	sq mi	Popn. (year)	Notes
Bourke	Municipality	Bourke	3 July 1878	1 January 1955				Boundaries extended and converted into Darling Shire
Darling	Shire	Bourke	1 January 1955	29 June 1973				Renamed Bourke Shire
Cobar	Municipality	Cobar	18 March 1884	NK				Boundaries extended and converted into Cobar Shire
Gladstone	Municipality	Wrightville	25 September 1899	24 December 1902				Separated from Cobar Municipality. Renamed Wrightville Municipality per Municipal District of Wrightville Naming Act
Wentworth	Municipality	Wentworth	23 January 1879	1 January 1957				Boundaries extended and converted into Wentworth Shire
Wilcannia	Municipality	Wilcannia	3 February 1883	1 May 1959				Boundaries extended and converted into Central Darling Shire
Wrightville	Municipality	Wrightville	24 December 1902	28 September 1922				Abolished and reabsorbed into Cobar Municipality per Wrightville Municipality Abolishment Act 1922

== See also ==
- Local government areas of New South Wales
- List of all local government areas in New South Wales
