= 1999 New South Wales local elections =

Local government elections in New South Wales, Australia

← 1995	11 September 1999	2004 →

151 of the 177 local government areas in New South Wales (1 election uncontested)

The 1999 New South Wales local elections were held on 11 September 1999 to elect the councils of 152 of the 177 local government areas (LGAs) of New South Wales, Australia.

Elections for 24 LGAs were deferred until 2000 while possible amalgamations were considered, while another LGA had its election postponed. One council was uncontested.

One Nation contested the local elections for the first time, with candidate Bob Thompson elected to Campbelltown City Council. Thompson left the party prior to the 2004 elections.

== Background ==
=== Deferred elections ===
In July 1999, changes were introduced to the Local Government Amendment (Amalgamations and Boundary Changes) Act 1999 to allow for 24 LGAs to defer their elections while voluntary amalgamation proposals were being discussed.

The following LGAs deferred their elections (listed with the LGAs that amalgamations were proposed with):

- Armidale and Dumaresq
- Burwood and Strathfield
- Concord and Drummoyne
- Grafton, Maclean, Ulmarra, Nymboida and Copmanhurst
- Richmond River and Casino
- South Sydney, Botany Bay and Randwick
- Tamworth, Parry, Walcha, Manilla, Nundle and Quirindi
- Windouran and Conargo

== Candidates ==
A total of 4,552 candidates contested the elections.

== Results ==
The Liberal Party contested Woollahra Council for the first time, which saw the Woollahra Action Committee lose its dominance and be left with only two seats.
