= 2000 New South Wales local elections =

Local government elections in New South Wales, Australia

- 27 May−12 December 2000

The 2000 New South Wales local elections were held from May to December 2000 elect the councils of local government areas (LGAs) of New South Wales, Australia. The elections were all scheduled to be held on 11 September 1999, but were deferred while possible amalgamations were considered.

== Background ==
=== Deferred elections ===
In July 1999, changes were introduced to the Local Government Amendment (Amalgamations and Boundary Changes) Act 1999 to allow for 24 LGAs to defer their elections while voluntary amalgamation proposals were being discussed.

The following LGAs deferred their elections (listed with the LGAs that amalgamations were proposed with):

- Armidale and Dumaresq
- Burwood and Strathfield
- Concord and Drummoyne
- Grafton, Maclean, Ulmarra, Nymboida and Copmanhurst
- Richmond River and Casino
- South Sydney, Botany Bay and Randwick
- Tamworth, Parry, Walcha, Manilla, Nundle and Quirindi
- Windouran and Conargo

== Election dates ==
For newly created LGAs, the elections were scheduled several months after the official proclamation and commencement of operations. A number of councils which deferred elections ultimately did not proceed with amalgamations, and also held elections.

=== Amalgamated councils ===
LGA	Former LGAs	Proclaimed	Commenced operations	Election date	Electors	Councillors	Ref
Armidale Dumaresq	Armidale; Dumaresq	18 February 2000	21 February 2000	27 May 2000	24,811	9	
Richmond Valley	Richmond River; Casino	18 February 2000	21 February 2000	3 June 2000	20,722	10	
Pristine Waters	Nymboida; Ulmarra	24 May 2000	1 July 2000	29 July 2000	10,676	9	
Canada Bay	Concord; Drummoyne	27 September 2000	1 December 2000	12 December 2000	60,926	9	

=== Non-amalgamated councils ===
A number of councils which deferred elections ultimately did not proceed with amalgamations, and also held elections throughout 2000.

LGA	Election date	Ref
South Sydney	1 July 2000	
Burwood	15 July 2000	
Strathfield	15 July 2000	
Parry	2 September 2000	
Tamworth	2 September 2000	
Nundle	4 November 2000	
Quirindi	4 November 2000	

== Results ==
The Australian Democrats had their first-ever victory on South Sydney City Council, with Peter Furness elected as a councillor for South Ward. However, he left the party in April 2003 to join Labor.

The elections marked a significant period of change in local government across New South Wales, as several newly amalgamated councils held their inaugural elections. The newly formed Armidale Dumaresq Council held its first election on 27 May 2000, followed by Richmond Valley on 3 June 2000, Pristine Waters on 29 July 2000, and Canada Bay on 12 December 2000. Several non-amalgamated councils also held deferred elections throughout the year, including South Sydney, Burwood, Strathfield, Parry, Tamworth, Nundle, and Quirindi.
