= Boorowa Shire =

Former local government area in New South Wales, Australia

Boorowa Council
- Local government area
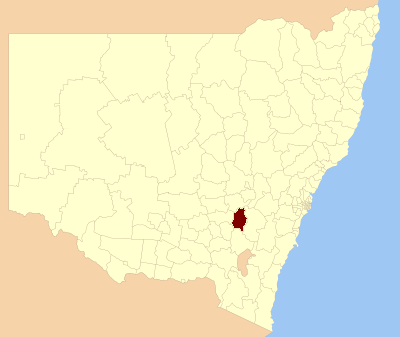
- Location in New South Wales
- Coordinates: 34°26′S 148°43′E
- Country: Australia
- State: New South Wales
- Region: South Western Slopes, Southern Tablelands
- Established: 1 September 1944
- Abolished: 12 May 2016
- Council seat: Boorowa

Government
  - Mayor: Wendy Tuckerman
  - State electorate: Goulburn
  - Federal division: Hume

Area
  - Total: 2,579 km^{2} (996 sq mi)

Population
  - Total: 2,558 (2013 est)
  - Density: 0.9919/km^{2} (2.5689/sq mi)
- Website: Boorowa Council
LGAs around Boorowa Council
Weddin	Cowra	Bathurst
Young	Boorowa Council	Upper Lachlan
Harden	Yass Valley	Upper Lachlan

Boorowa Council was a local government area in the South Western Slopes region of New South Wales, Australia. The LGA was located adjacent to the Lachlan Valley Way and included Boorowa and the small towns of Rye Park, Rugby, Frogmore and Reids Flat. Burrowa LGA was formed on 1 September 1944 through the amalgamation of Murrungal Shire and the Municipality of Burrowa.

On 12 May 2016, the Boorowa Council was abolished and merged with the Harden and Young shires to establish the Hilltops Council.

The last mayor of Boorowa Council was Wendy Tuckerman, an independent politician.

== Council ==
=== Composition and election method ===
Boorowa Council was composed of nine councillors elected proportionally as one entire ward. All councillors were elected for a fixed four-year term of office. The mayor was elected by the councillors at the first meeting of the council. The last election was held on 8 September 2012, and the makeup of the council was as follows:

Party	Councillors
Independents and Unaligned	9
Total	9

The final Council, elected in 2012, in order of election, was:

Councillor	Party	Notes
Wendy Tuckerman	Independent	Mayor
Peter Sykes	Unaligned	
Christopher Corcoran	Unaligned	Deputy Mayor
Jack Ryan	Unaligned	
Tim McGrath	Unaligned	
Robert Gledhill	Unaligned	
David Evans	Independent	
Andrew Southwell	Unaligned	
Gus Clements	Unaligned	

== Amalgamation ==
A 2015 review of local government boundaries recommended that Boorowa Council merge with adjoining councils. The NSW Government considered two proposals. The first proposed a merger between the Boorowa Council and Harden and Young shires to form a new council with an area of 7,139 square kilometres (2,756 sq mi) and support a population of approximately 19,000. Following the lodging of an alternate proposal by Harden Shire on 28 February 2016 to amalgamate the Cootamundra, Gundagai and Harden shires, the NSW Minister for Local Government proposed a merger between Boorowa Council and Young shire. Boorowa Council was abolished on 12 May 2016 and along with Harden Shire and Young Shire, the area was included in the new Hilltops Council local government area.
