= Scone Shire =

Former local government area in New South Wales, Australia

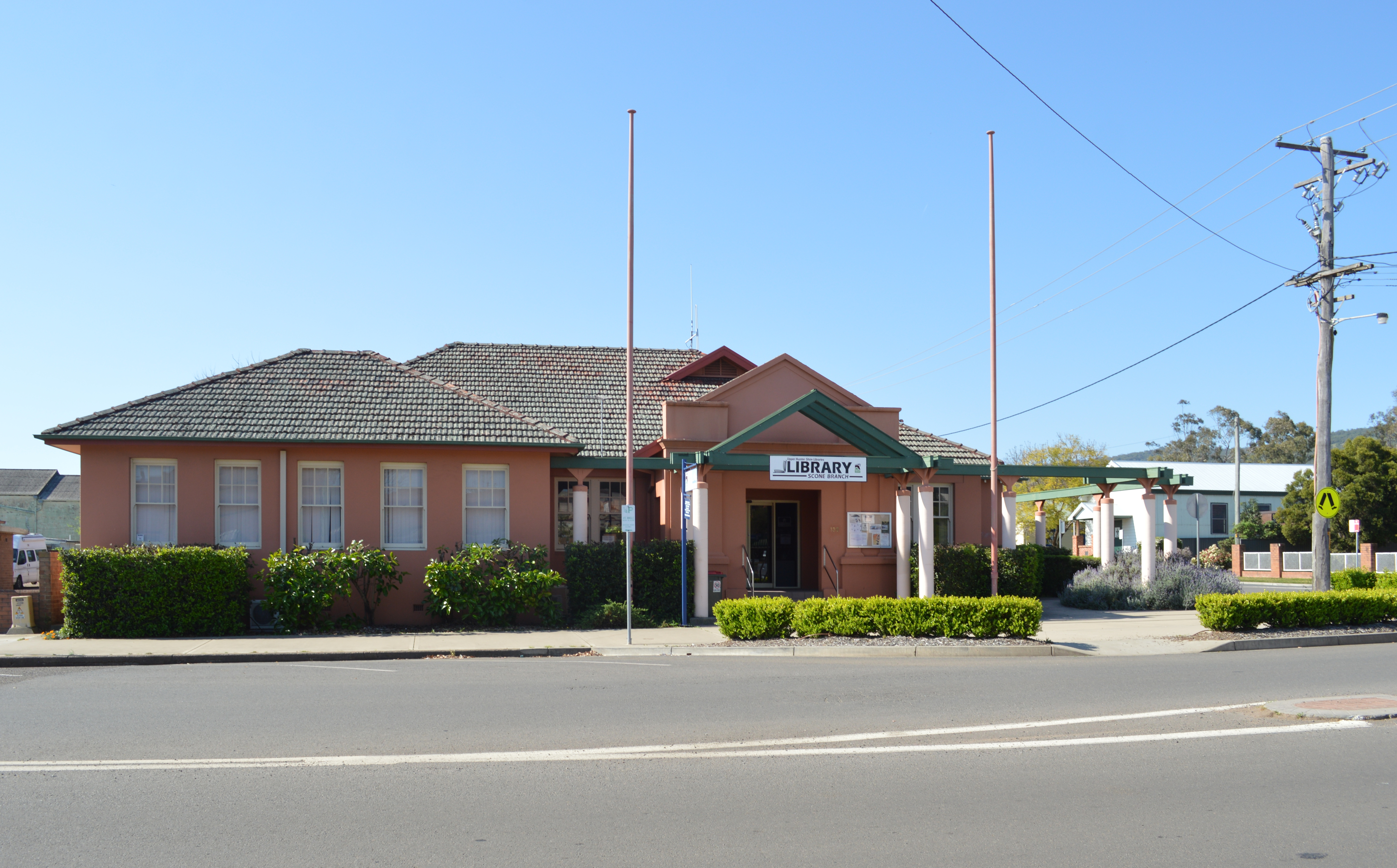
The former Scone Shire offices, now used as a library

Scone Shire was a local government area in the Hunter region of New South Wales, Australia. The shire offices were located in the town of Scone.

It was established on 1 January 1958 following the amalgamation of the Municipality of Scone with the original Upper Hunter Shire. The shire had surrounded the municipality and the offices of both had been located in the town.

It amalgamated with parts of the abolished Merriwa Shire and Murrurundi Shire to form a new, larger Upper Hunter Shire on 17 March 2004.
