= Cambewarra Shire =

Former local government area in New South Wales, Australia

Cambewarra Shire New South Wales
- Established: 7 March 1906
- Abolished: 1 July 1948
- Council seat: Kangaroo Valley
- Region: South Coast

Cambewarra Shire was a local government area in the South Coast region of New South Wales, Australia.

Cambewarra Shire was proclaimed on 7 March 1906, one of 134 shires created after the passing of the Local Government (Shires) Act 1905.

The shire offices were in Kangaroo Valley.

The shire was amalgamated with the Municipality of Berry, Municipality of South Shoalhaven, Municipality of Broughton Vale, Municipality of Ulladulla, Municipality of Nowra and Clyde Shire to form Shoalhaven Shire on 1 July 1948.
