= Warrah Shire =

Former local government area in New South Wales, Australia

Warrah Shire New South Wales
- Established: 7 March 1906
- Abolished: 1 October 1948
- Council seat: Scone
- Region: Hunter

Warrah Shire was a local government area in the Hunter region of New South Wales, Australia.

Warrah Shire was proclaimed on 7 March 1906, one of 134 shires created after the passing of the Local Government (Shires) Act 1905.

The shire office was in Murrurundi.

Warrah Shire amalgamated with the Municipality of Murrurundi to form Murrurundi Shire on 1 October 1948.
