= Municipality of Narrandera =

- Local government area
- Coordinates: 34°45′0″S 146°33′0″E
- Country: Australia
- State: New South Wales
- Region: Riverina
- Established: 1885
- Abolished: 1 January 1960
- Council seat: Narrandera

The Municipality of Narrandera was a local government area of New South Wales centred on the town of Narrandera which existed from 1885 until 1960 when it was amalgamated alongside Yanko Shire to form Narrandera Shire.

== Council ==
The Narrandera Municipal Council met tri-weekly and was composed of 9 aldermen.

=== 1950–1953 Council ===
W. G. Armstrong served as Mayor.

1950–1953 Council
Councillor	Party	Notes
W. G. Armstrong	Unaligned	Mayor
T. Gordon	Unaligned	
D. Wall	Unaligned	
W. J. Gammage	Unaligned	
W. Sullivan	Unaligned	
H. Roberts	Unaligned	
K. Kiesling	Unaligned	
J. Ward	Unaligned	
Ald. MacAulay	Unaligned	

== Mayors ==
The list of mayors of Narrandera Council (1885–1959) appears below.

Mayor	Term
Robert Heatie Ferrier	1885
Henry Daniel Adams	1886
John Armstrong	1887
James Moulton	1888
Bruce Kennedy	1988–1989
James Bowes	1889 (February–March)
John Fleming Willans (1st term)	1890–1893
Michael Cohen	1894
John Fleming Willans (2nd term)	1894 (July)
Peter Sullivan	1895
James Armstrong	1896
Lewis S Abrahams	1897
Thomas Henry Elwin (1st term)	1898
Fred Allan Smith (1st term)	1899–1900
James Joseph Quirk	1901
Fred Allan Smith (2nd term)	1902–1903
Ebenezer C H Matthews (1st term)	1904–1906
Thomas Henry Elwin (2nd term)	1907–1913
James Charles Little	1914
Thomas Henry Elwin (3rd term)	1915–1916
Ebernezer C H Matthews (2nd term)	1916 (November)
John Anderson McPherson	1917–1919
Robert Henry Hankinson (1st term)	1920–1921
George Norman Dixon	1922–1923
Robert Henry Hankinson (2nd term)	1924
William H Harden	1924 (April), 1925
Robert Henry Hankinson (3rd term)	1926
Samuel Henry Barker	1927
Robert Henry Hankinson (4th term)	1928–1930
Frederick Thelwell Yeoman (1st term)	1930 (August), 1931
Thomas Henry Mancy	1932–1934
Frederick Thelwell Yeoman (2nd term)	1935
Alexander Baird	1936–1937
Frederick Thelwell Yeoman (3rd term)	1938
Ralph E R Skinner	1939
Francis Charles Garner (1st term)	1940
Thomas Gordon (1st term)	1941
Richard Eric Blamey	1942
Thomas Gordon (2nd term)	1943–1944
George F Hepburn	1945
William Joseph Gammage	1946
John Archer Lorimer	1947
Francis Charles Garner (2nd term)	1948–1950
Robert Henry Hankinson (5th term)	1951
William George Armstrong	1951 (June), 1959
