= Municipality of Ulladulla =

Former local government area in New South Wales, Australia

- Local government area
- Country: Australia
- State: New South Wales
- Established: 14 April 1874
- Abolished: 23 June 1948

The Municipality of Ulladulla was a municipality of New South Wales that existed from 1874 to 1948. It was divided into the three wards of Ulladulla, Milton and Narrawallee.

In 1948, the Municipality of Ulladulla was merged with the municipalities of Berry, Nowra, Broughton's Vale, South Shoalhaven and the shires of Cambewarra and Clyde to form Shoalhaven Shire (now City of Shoalhaven).
