= Orara Shire =

Former local government area in New South Wales, Australia

Orara Shire New South Wales
- Established: 7 March 1906
- Abolished: 1 January 1957
- Council seat: South Grafton
- Region: Northern Rivers

Orara Shire was a local government area in the Northern Rivers region of New South Wales, Australia.

Orara Shire was proclaimed on 7 March 1906, one of 134 shires created after the passing of the Local Government (Shires) Act 1905.

The shire offices were in South Grafton.

Orara Shire was abolished and split on 1 January 1957 with part absorbed along with the Municipality of South Grafton and parts of Copmanhurst Shire into the City of Grafton and part merged with the Municipality of Maclean to form Maclean Shire, part merged with Municipality of Ulmurra to form Ulmurra Shire.
