= Woodburn Shire =

Former local government area in New South Wales, Australia

Woodburn Shire New South Wales
- Population: 4,002 (1961)
- Established: 7 March 1906
- Abolished: 1 January 1976
- Council seat: Coraki
- Region: Northern Rivers

Woodburn Shire was a local government area in the Northern Rivers region of New South Wales, Australia.

Woodburn Shire was proclaimed on 7 March 1906, one of 134 shires created after the passing of the Local Government (Shires) Act 1905. It absorbed the Municipality of Coraki on 1 January 1934.

The shire offices were in Coraki. Other towns and villages in the shire included Broadwater, Evans Head and Woodburn.

In 1961 the population of Woodbury Shire was 4002.

Woodburn Shire was abolished and amalgamated with part of Tomki Shire to form Richmond River Shire on 1 January 1976.
