= Cootamundra Shire =

Former local government area in New South Wales, Australia

- Local government area
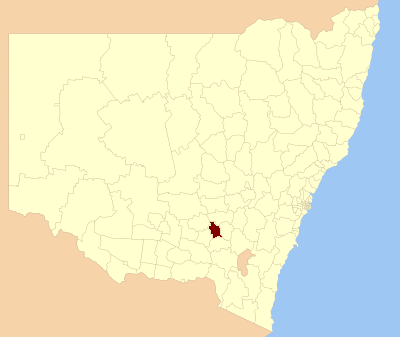
- Location in New South Wales
- Coordinates: 34°39′S 148°02′E
- Country: Australia
- State: New South Wales
- Region: South West Slopes
- Established: 1 April 1975
- Abolished: 12 May 2016
- Council seat: Cootamundra

Government
  - Mayor: Jim Slattery
  - State electorate: Cootamundra
  - Federal division: Hume

Area
  - Total: 1,524 km^{2} (588 sq mi)

Population
  - Total: 7,620 (2012)
  - Density: 5.000/km^{2} (12.950/sq mi)
- Website: Cootamundra Shire
LGAs around Cootamundra Shire
Temora	Young	Young
Temora	Cootamundra Shire	Harden
Junee	Gundagai	Gundagai

Cootamundra Shire was a local government area in the Riverina region of New South Wales, Australia. The Shire was located adjacent to the Olympic Highway, the Burley Griffin Way and the Main South railway line. The Shire included the town of Cootamundra and the small towns of Stockinbingal, Brawlin and Wallendbeen and the locality of Frampton. The Shire was created on 1 April 1975 by the amalgamation of Jindalee Shire and the Municipality of Cootamundra.

In 2016, it merged with the neighbouring Gundagai Shire to form the Gundagai Council, later renamed to be Cootamundra-Gundagai Regional Council.

The last mayor of Cootamundra Shire was Jim Slattery.

== Council ==
=== Composition and election method ===
Cootamundra Shire Council was composed of nine councillors elected proportionally to a single ward. All councillors were elected for a fixed four-year term of office. The mayor was elected by the councillors at the first meeting of the council. The last election was held on 8 September 2012, and the makeup of the council was as follows:

Party	Councillors
Independents and Unaligned	9
Total	9

The last Council, elected in 2012, was:

Councillor	Party	Notes
Doug Phillips	Unaligned	
Craig Stewart	Unaligned	
Dennis Palmer	Unaligned	
Stephen Doidge	Unaligned	
Jim Slattery	Unaligned	Mayor
Paul Braybrooks	Unaligned	
Rosalind Wight	Unaligned	
Mary Donnelly	Independent	
Rod Chalmers	Unaligned	

== Failed amalgamation ==
A 2015 review of local government boundaries recommended that Cootamundra Shire merge with adjoining councils. The NSW Government considered two proposals. The first proposed a merger between the Cootamundra and Gundagai shires to form a new council with an area of 3,981 square kilometres (1,537 sq mi) and support a population of approximately 11,500. The alternative, proposed by Harden Shire on 28 February 2016, was for an amalgamation of the Cootamundra, Gundagai and Harden shires. The outcome of an independent review was announced in May 2016, with the result that Cootamundra merged with Gundagai Shire to form the Gundagai Council. After constant agitation from both Gundagai and Cootamundra communities, with particularly aggressive hostility from the Gundagai community, the Local Government minister, Wendy Tuckerman, determined that the council will be de-amalgamated. In September 2024 independent council elections will be held for Cootamundra and Gundagai.
