= Merriwa Shire =

Former local government area in New South Wales, Australia

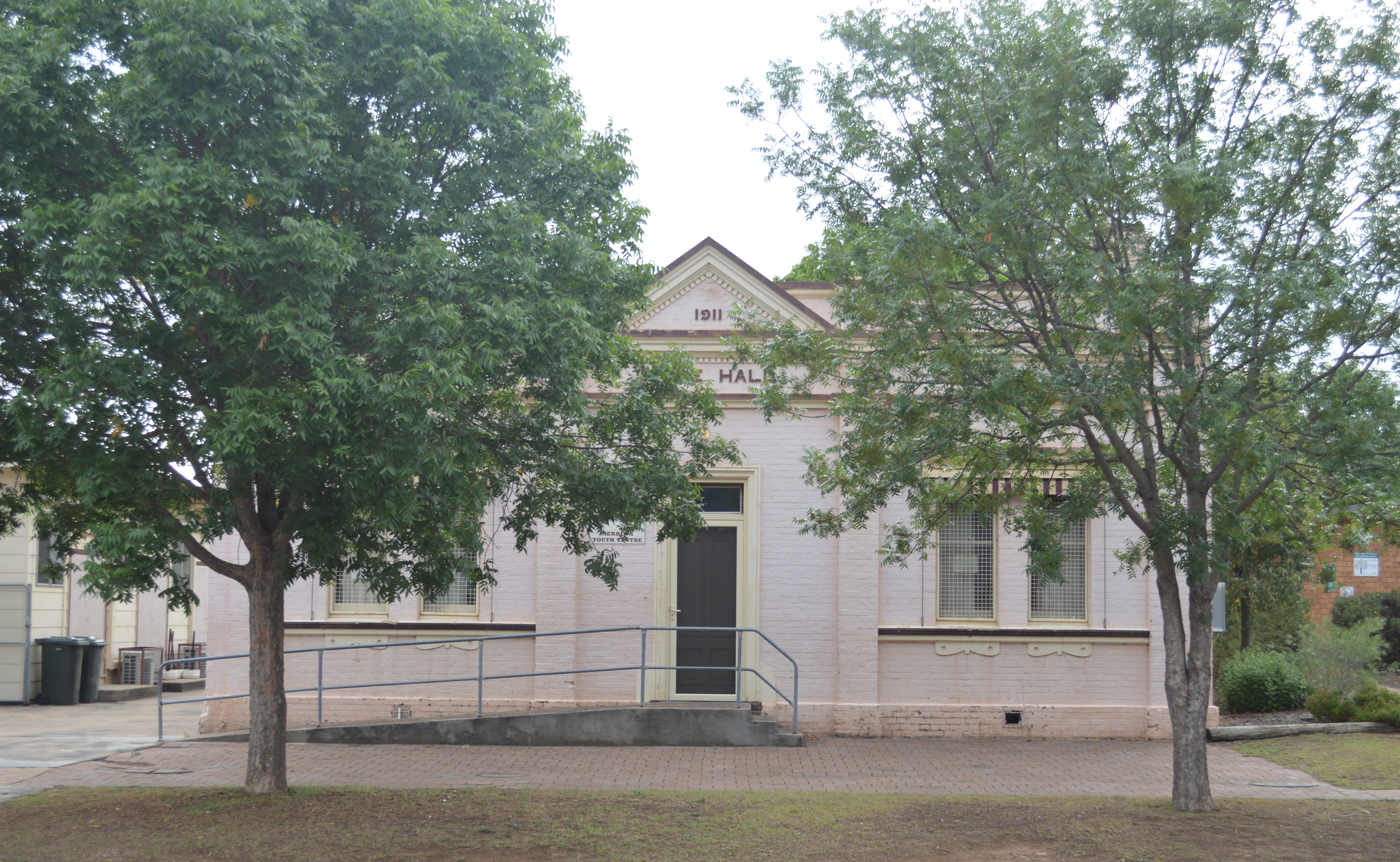
The former Merriwa Shire hall, built in 1911

Merriwa Shire was a local government area in New South Wales, Australia.

Merriwa Shire was based in the town of Merriwa, New South Wales, and covered an area of the upper Hunter Valley region, bounded by the Liverpool Range to the north, drained by several rivers and creeks flowing southwards to the Goulburn River. Merriwa was the only significant town in the shire.

The Shire was abolished in the 2004 local government restructuring, and combined with Scone Shire and most of Murrurundi Shire to form the new Upper Hunter Shire. A small part of the Shire was added to the Mid-Western Regional Council, based in Mudgee.
