= Mumbulla Shire =

Former local government area in New South Wales, Australia

Mumbulla Shire New South Wales
- Population: 3,752 (1961)
- Established: 7 March 1906
- Abolished: 1 January 1981
- Council seat: Bega
- Region: South Coast

Mumbulla Shire was a local government area in the South Coast region of New South Wales, Australia.

Mumbulla Shire was proclaimed on 7 March 1906, one of 134 shires created after the passing of the Local Government (Shires) Act 1905.

The shire office was in Bega but Bega itself was not in Mumbulla shire. Other towns and villages in the shire included Bemboka, Bermagui and Cobargo.

In 1961 Mumbulla Shire had a population of 3752.

Mumbulla Shire was amalgamated with Imlay Shire and the Municipality of Bega on 1 January 1981 to create Bega Valley Shire per the Local Government Areas Amalgamation Act 1980.
