= Peel Shire =

Former local government area in New South Wales, Australia

Peel Shire was a local government area, in New South Wales, Australia.

Peel Shire was proclaimed in 1907 and covered a rural area surrounding the town ( and later, city ) of Tamworth. It was named after the Peel River which runs through the area.

Peel Shire was amalgamated with Cockburn Shire to form Parry Shire. In 2004, the City of Tamworth, and the surrounding shires Parry Shire, Nundle Shire, Manilla Shire and Barraba Shire were amalgamated to form the Tamworth Regional Council local government area.
