= Gadara Shire =

Former local government area in New South Wales, Australia

Gadara Shire New South Wales
- Established: 7 March 1906
- Abolished: 1 July 1928
- Council seat: Tumut
- Region: Riverina

Gadara Shire was a local government area in the eastern part of the Riverina region of New South Wales, Australia.

Gadara Shire was proclaimed on 7 March 1906 as Yarrangobilly Shire. It was renamed as Gadara Shire on 12 February 1907.

The shire offices were based in Tumut. Urban areas in the shire included Adelong and Batlow and the village of Grahamstown.

The shire was amalgamated with the Municipality of Tumut to form Tumut Shire on 1 July 1928.
