= Wallendbeen =

- Town
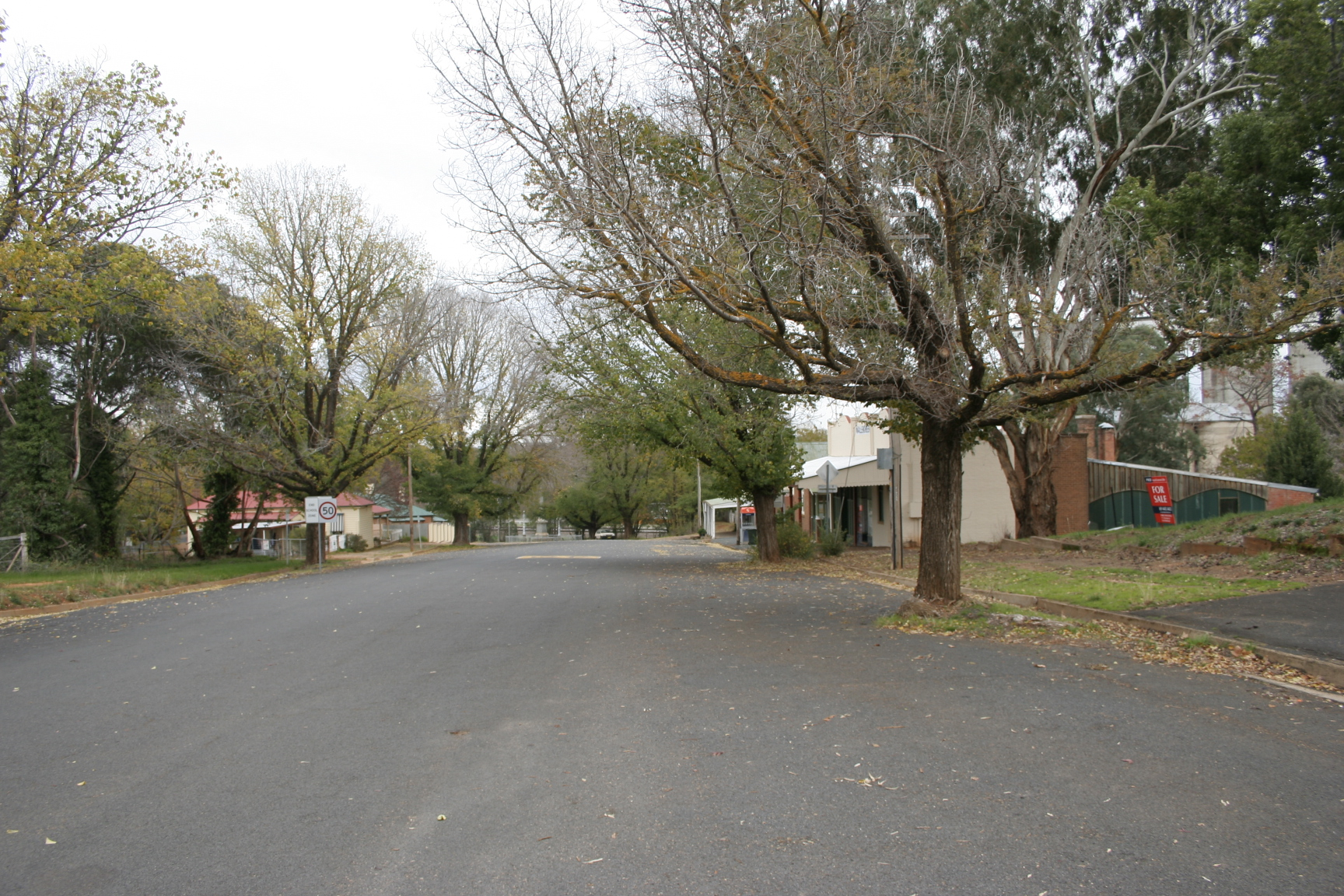
- Streetscape at Wallendbeen

- Coordinates: 34°32′0″S 148°09′0″E
- Country: Australia
- State: New South Wales
- LGA: Cootamundra-Gundagai Regional Council
- Location: 362 km (225 mi) SW of Sydney; 147 km (91 mi) NW of Canberra; 113 km (70 mi) NE of Wagga Wagga; 20 km (12 mi) NE of Cootamundra

Government
  - State electorate: Cootamundra
  - Federal division: Riverina
- Elevation: 476 m (1,562 ft)

Population
  - Total: 260 (2016 census)
- Postcode: 2588

Wallendbeen is a small town in southern New South Wales, Australia, administered by Cootamundra-Gundagai Regional Council. At the 2011 census, Wallendbeen and the surrounding area had a population of 305. The town's name is derived from an aboriginal word for "stony hill".

The town is located on the intersection of the Olympic Highway and the Burley Griffin Way and on the Sydney–Melbourne railway, opened to Wallendbeen in 1877. Wheat is an important industry for the area. It has a fine oval, which has supported a cricket club since 1887. The Wallendbeen Cricket Club was last captained by Tom Grace, the third generation of his family to hold the title. Wallendbeen Post Office opened on 1 July 1885. The Baldry Shield, a sports carnival for small primary schools in the area, is held in Wallendbeen annually.

From 1895 to 1935 the town had its own local government, the Municipality of Wallendbeen, with its own municipal council and mayor. It was eventually absorbed into Jindalee Shire and Demondrille Shire.

It is now becoming a dormitory suburb of Cootamundra.

== Notable residents ==
- Kenneth Mackay (Australian politician)

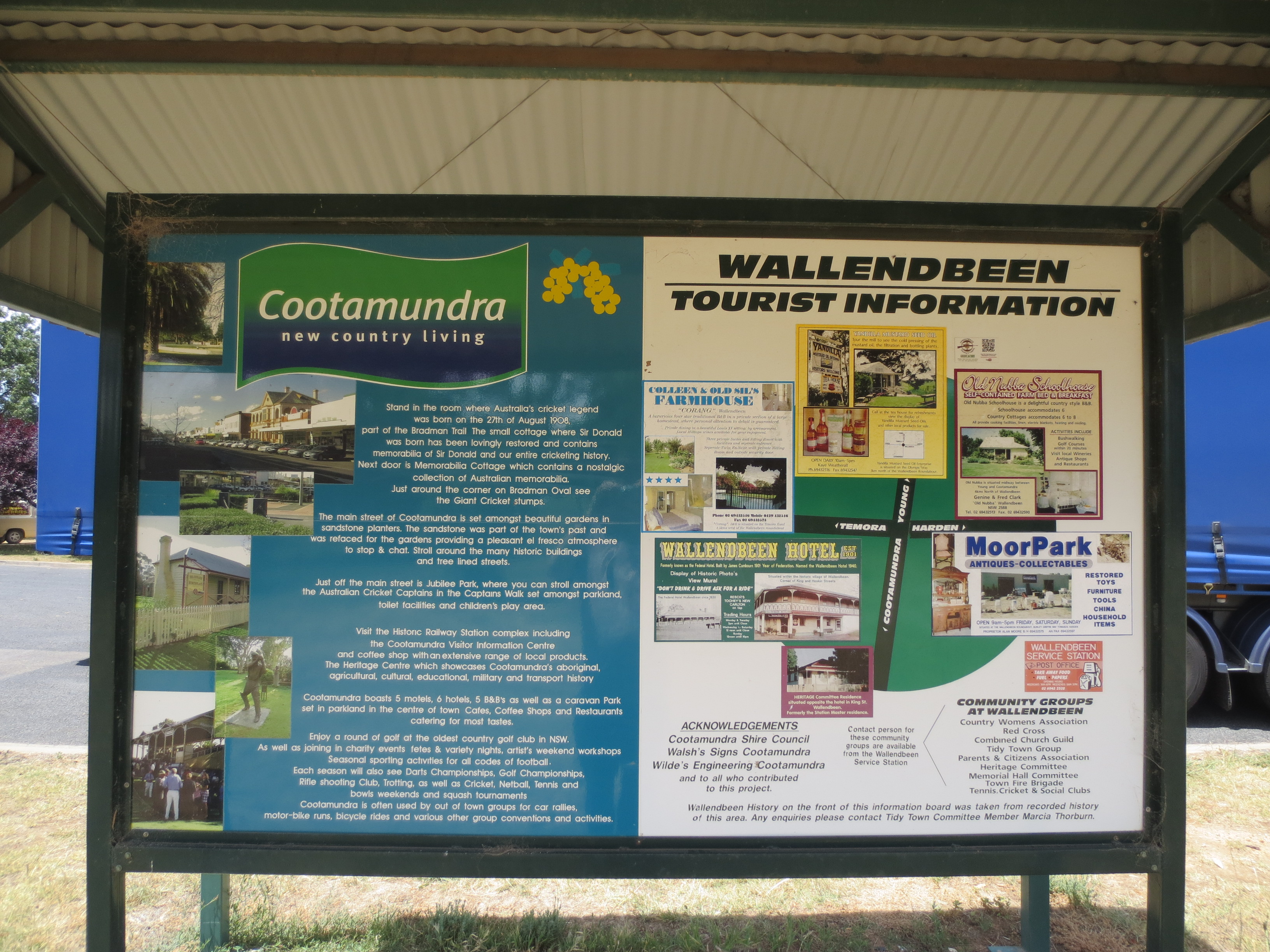
Wallendbeen information sign (2016)

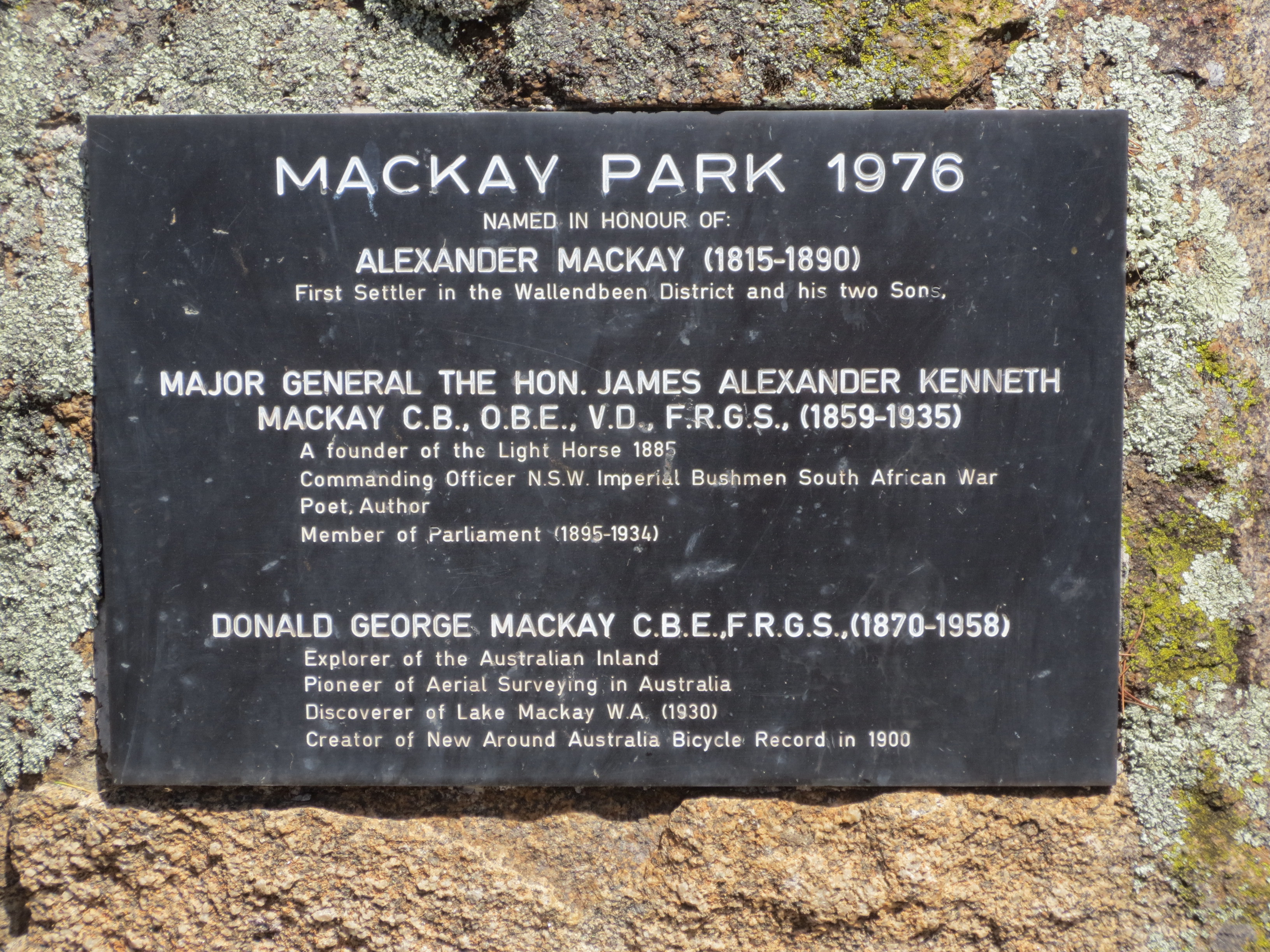
Mackay Park , Wallendbeen

Preceding station	Former services	Following station
Morrisons Hill towards Albury	Main Southern Line	Nubba towards Sydney
