= Yanko Shire =

Former local government area in New South Wales, Australia

- Local government area
- Country: Australia
- State: New South Wales
- Region: Riverina
- Established: 7 March 1906
- Abolished: 1 January 1960
- Council seat: Narrandera

Yanko Shire was a local government area in the Riverina region of New South Wales, Australia.

Yanko Shire was proclaimed on 7 March 1906. On 6 January 1928, Willimbong Shire (later renamed Leeton Shire) was excised from its territory as per the provisions of the Irrigation Act 1912.

Yanko Shire shared an administration office with the Municipality of Narrandera.

The shire was amalgamated with the Municipality of Narrandera on 1 January 1960 to form Narrandera Shire.
