= Cockburn Shire =

Former local government area in New South Wales, Australia

Cockburn Shire was a local government area in the Australian state of New South Wales.

Cockburn Shire was established in 1907, and covered a sparsely populated area east of the town of Tamworth, in the area of the Cockburn River, after which the shire was named.

Cockburn Shire was amalgamated with Peel Shire in 1980, to create Parry Shire. In 2004, the city of Tamworth local government area took over the neighbouring Manilla, Barraba, Parry and Nundle shires to form Tamworth Regional Council.
