= Gostwyck Shire =

Former local government area in New South Wales, Australia

Gostwyck Shire New South Wales
- Established: 7 March 1906
- Abolished: 1 January 1948
- Council seat: Uralla
- Region: New England

Gostwyck Shire was a local government area in the New England region of New South Wales, Australia.

Gostwyck Shire was proclaimed on 7 March 1906, one of 134 shires created after the passing of the Local Government (Shires) Act 1905.

The shire office was in Uralla. Towns and villages in the shire included Bundarra, Yarrowyck, Kingstown and Kentucky.

Gostwyck Shire was amalgamated with the Municipality of Uralla to form Uralla Shire on 1 January 1948.
