= Municipality of Scone =

Municipality in New South Wales (1888–1958)

- Local government area
- Country: Australia
- State: New South Wales
- Region: Hunter
- Established: 10 July 1888
- Abolished: 1 January 1958
- Council seat: Scone

Population
  - Total: 3,351 (1954)

The Municipality of Scone was a local government area located in the Hunter Region of New South Wales, Australia.

The Municipality of Scone was established on 10 July 1888. Their first meeting was held on 17 July 1888. It was held in the upper floor of the School of Arts in Scone.

In the 1954 Australian census the population of the Municipality of Scone was recorded as 3,351. The Municipality of Scone was amalgamated with the original Upper Hunter Shire to form Scone Shire on 1 January 1958.
