= Municipality of Nowra =

Former local government area in New South Wales, Australia

Municipality of Nowra New South Wales
- Established: 30 December 1871
- Abolished: 1 July 1948

The Municipality of Nowra was a municipality of New South Wales that existed from 1871 to 1948.

In 1948, the Municipality of Nowra merged with the Municipalities of Berry, Broughton's Vale, Ulladulla, South Shoalhaven, and the shires of Cambewarra and Clyde to form the Shoalhaven Shire Council.
