= Patrick Plains Shire =

Former local government area in New South Wales, Australia

Patrick Plains Shire New South Wales
- Established: 7 March 1906
- Abolished: 1 January 1976
- Council seat: Singleton
- Region: Hunter

Patrick Plains Shire was a local government area in the Hunter region of New South Wales, Australia.

Patrick Plains Shire was proclaimed on 7 March 1906, one of 134 shires created after the passing of the Local Government (Shires) Act 1905.

The shire office was in Singleton. Towns and villages in the shire included Jerry's Plains, Broke and Camberwell.

Patrick Plains Shire amalgamated with the Municipality of Singleton on 1 January 1976 to form Singleton Shire.
