= Meroo Shire =

Former local government area in New South Wales, Australia

Meroo Shire New South Wales
- Established: 7 March 1906
- Abolished: 2 May 1924
- Council seat: Mudgee
- Region: Central West

Meroo Shire was a local government area in the Central West region of New South Wales, Australia.

Meroo Shire was proclaimed on 7 March 1906, with the first meeting held on 6 December 1906. It met in Mudgee throughout its existence: first in the courthouse and then the Cudgegong municipal chambers, but later in its own shire offices in Perry Street.

In 1921, it covered an area of 1170 square miles, had a population of between 4000 and 5000, and was responsible for the maintenance of 530 miles of roads.

Meroo Shire amalgamated with the Municipality of Cudgegong to form Cudgegong Shire on 2 May 1924.
