= Municipality of Singleton =

Former local government area in New South Wales, Australia

Municipality of Singleton New South Wales
- Abolished: 1 January 1976
- Region: Hunter

The Municipality of Singleton was a local government area in the Hunter Region of New South Wales, Australia.

It was abolished on 1 January 1976 after amalgamating with Patrick Plains Shire to form Singleton Shire (now Singleton Council).

== Election results ==
=== 1944 ===
1944 New South Wales local elections: Singleton
Party	Candidate	Votes	%	±%
Independent	J. Brittliffe	503	13.4	
Independent	J. McGrogan	452	12.1	
Independent	R. H. Burgess	451	12.0	
Independent	R. J. Tulloch	443	11.8	
Independent	C. H. Dunlop	414	11.0	
Independent	E. Patridge	399	10.6	
Independent	G. H. Dunlop	383	10.2	
Independent	F. H. Madden	367	9.8	
Independent	F. Dickinson	337	9.0	
Total formal votes		3,749	100.0	
