= Harden Shire =

Former local government area in New South Wales, Australia

- Local government area
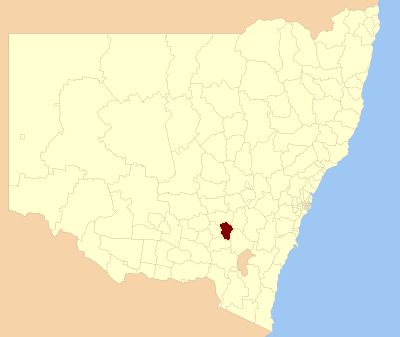
- Location in New South Wales
- Coordinates: 34°33′S 148°22′E
- Country: Australia
- State: New South Wales
- Region: South West Slopes
- Established: 1 January 1975
- Abolished: 12 May 2016
- Council seat: Harden

Government
  - Mayor: John Horton
  - State electorate: Cootamundra
  - Federal division: Hume

Area
  - Total: 1,869 km^{2} (722 sq mi)

Population
  - Total: 3,584 (2011 census)
  - Density: 1.9176/km^{2} (4.9666/sq mi)
- Website: Harden Shire
LGAs around Harden Shire
Young	Young	Boorowa
Cootamundra	Harden Shire	Yass
Cootamundra	Gundagai	Yass

Harden Shire was a local government area in the South West Slopes region of New South Wales, Australia. The Shire included the twin towns of Harden and Murrumburrah and the small towns of Galong, Jugiong, Wombat and Kingsvale.

The Shire was established in 1975 from the merger of the Municipality of Murrumburrah with Demondrille Shire. In 2016, Harden Shire was amalgamated with Boorowa Shire and Young Shire to create Hilltops Council.

The last mayor of Harden Shire was John Horton, an unaligned politician.

== Council ==
=== Composition and election method ===
Harden Shire Council was composed of seven councillors elected proportionally as one entire ward. All councillors were elected for a fixed four-year term of office. The mayor was elected by the councillors at the first meeting of the council. The last democratic election was held on 8 September 2012, and the makeup of the council was as follows:

Party	Councillors
Independents and Unaligned	7
Total	7

The final Council, elected in 2012 and dissolved in 2016, in order of election, was:

Councillor	Party	Notes
Chris Manchester	Unaligned	Mayor
Matthew Stadtmiller	Independent Deputy Mayor	
John Horton	Unaligned	
Tony Flanery	Unaligned	
Cathy Sanderson	Unaligned	
Neil Reid	Unaligned	
Tony Campbell	Unaligned	

== Amalgamation ==
A 2015 review of local government boundaries recommended that Harden Shire merge with adjoining councils. The NSW Government considered two proposals. The first proposed a merger between the Harden, Boorowa and Young shires to form a new council with an area of 7,139 square kilometres (2,756 sq mi) and support a population of approximately 19,000. The alternative, proposed by Harden Shire on 28 February 2016, was for an amalgamation of the Cootamundra, Gundagai and Harden shires. Following an independent review, on 12 May 2016, the Minister for Local Government announced the dissolution of the Boorowa, Harden and Young shires and merged the areas to form the Hilltops Council with immediate effect.

== Gallery ==
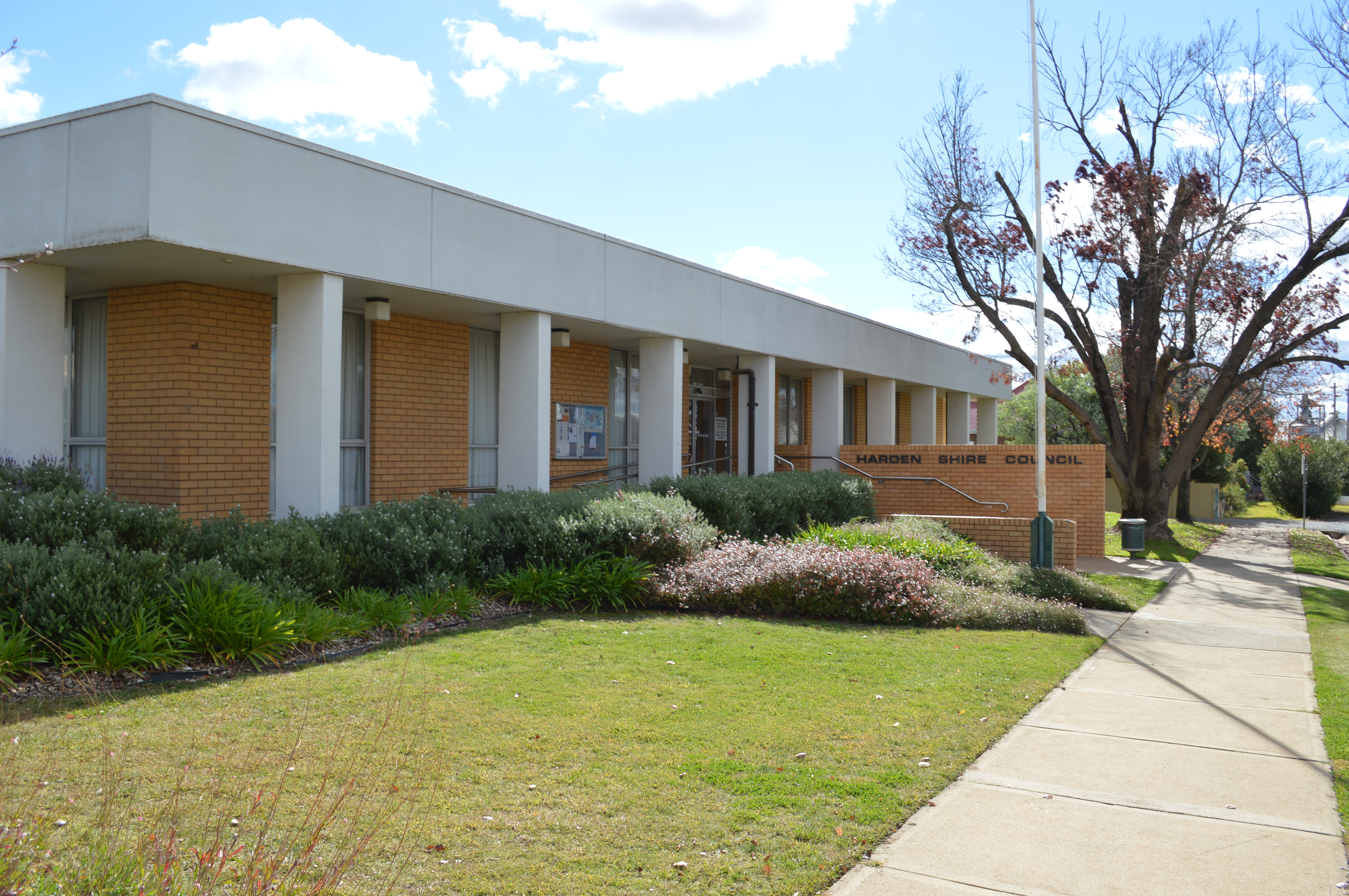
The former Harden Shire Council office

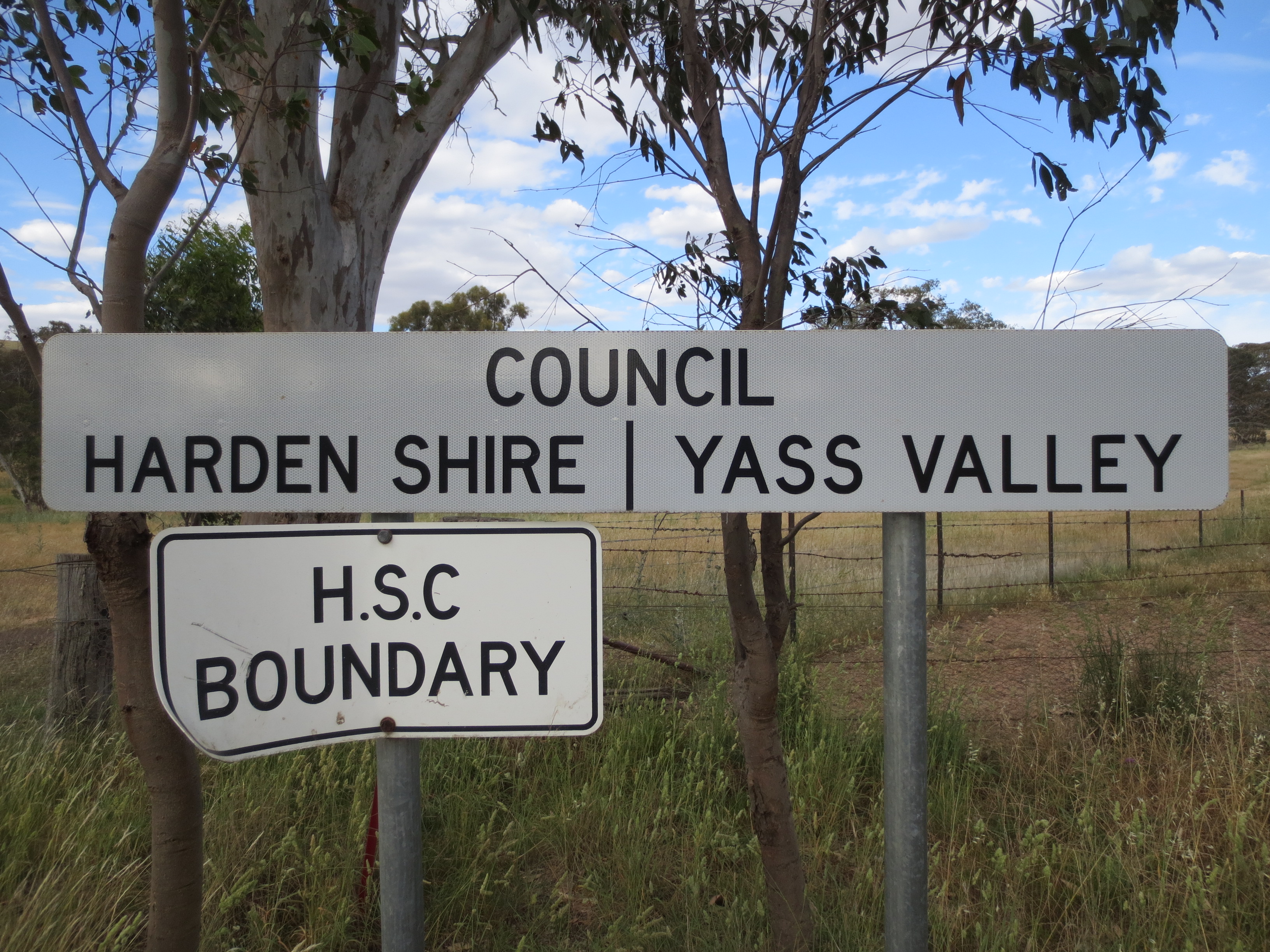
A former shire boundary sign (circa 2015)
