= Upper Hunter Shire (former) =

Former local government area in New South Wales, Australia

- Local government area
- Country: Australia
- State: New South Wales
- Region: Hunter
- Established: 7 March 1906
- Abolished: 1 January 1958
- Council seat: Scone

Upper Hunter Shire was a local government area in the Hunter Valley of New South Wales, Australia.

Upper Hunter Shire was proclaimed on 7 March 1906 as Wooluma Shire, one of 134 shires created after the passing of the Local Government (Shires) Act 1905. The shire was renamed Woolooma Shire on 13 February 1907. It was later renamed Upper Hunter Shire on 11 April 1917.

The shire absorbed the Municipality of Aberdeen on 7 October 1937.

The shire office was in Scone.

Upper Hunter Shire amalgamated with the Municipality of Scone on 1 January 1958 to form Scone Shire.
