= Macleay Shire =

Former local government area in New South Wales, Australia

Macleay Shire New South Wales
- Established: 7 March 1906
- Abolished: 1 October 1975
- Council seat: West Kempsey
- Region: Mid North Coast

Macleay Shire was a local government area in the Mid North Coast region of New South Wales, Australia.

Macleay Shire was proclaimed on 7 March 1906, one of 134 shires created after the passing of the Local Government (Shires) Act 1905.

The shire offices were in West Kempsey. Other towns in the shire included Bellbrook, Frederickton, Smithtown and South West Rocks.

Macleay Shire was amalgamated with the Municipality of Kempsey to form Kempsey Shire on 1 October 1975.
