= Pristine Waters Council =

Former local government area in New South Wales, Australia

- Local government area
- Country: Australia
- State: New South Wales
- Region: Northern Rivers
- Established: 1 July 2000
- Abolished: 24 February 2004

Area
  - Total: 6,800 km^{2} (2,600 sq mi)

Population
  - Total: 10,700 (2003)
  - Density: 1.574/km^{2} (4.08/sq mi)
- Website: Pristine Waters Council

Pristine Waters Council (sometimes referred to as Pristine Waters Shire) was a short-lived local government area in the Northern Rivers region of New South Wales, Australia.

It was proclaimed on 24 May 2000 and commenced operations officially on 1 July 2000, following a merger of Nymboida Shire and Ulmarra Shire.

After just four years, Pristine Waters amalgamated with Grafton, Copmanhurst and Maclean to form Clarence Valley Council on 24 February 2004.

Prior to the amalgamation, Pristine Waters was scheduled to have an election on 27 March 2004, although only one candidate had nominated with the New South Wales Electoral Commission as of 24 February (the same day as the abolition). The last-minute abolition prevented incumbent councillor Olive Boundy from contesting the election in Coffs Harbour.

== Council ==
=== Final composition ===
Pristine Waters was an undivided council composed of nine councillors, with 10,676 people in the LGA were eligible to vote. The position of mayor was elected by councillors. The only election was held on 29 July 2000, and the makeup of the council following the election was as follows:

Party	Councillors
Independents	8
Independent Labor	1
Total	9

The final council, elected in 2000, was:

Councillor	Party	Notes
Olive Boundy	Independent Labor	Mayor (2003)
Cec Hyde	Independent	Deputy Mayor (2003)
Kerry Lloyd	Independent	Mayor (2000−2002)
Geoff Jones	Independent	
Susan McPherson	Independent	
Cathy Peck	Independent	
Bruce Tucker	Independent	
Tony Wade	Independent	
Peter Williamson	Independent	
