= Imlay Shire =

Former local government area in New South Wales, Australia

Imlay Shire New South Wales
- Population: 5,283 (1961)
- Established: 7 March 1906
- Abolished: 1 January 1981
- Council seat: Eden
- Region: South Coast

Imlay Shire was a local government area in the South Coast region of New South Wales, Australia.

Imlay Shire was proclaimed on 7 March 1906, one of 134 shires created after the passing of the Local Government (Shires) Act 1905.

The shire office was in Eden. Other towns and villages in the shire include Candelo, Merimbula, Pambula and Tathra.

In 1961 Imlay Shire had a population of 5283.

Imlay Shire was amalgamated with Mumbulla Shire and the Municipality of Bega on 1 January 1981 to create Bega Valley Shire per the Local Government Areas Amalgamation Act 1980.
