= Adjungbilly Shire =

Former local government area in New South Wales, Australia

Adjungbilly Shire New South Wales
- Established: 7 March 1906
- Abolished: 1 January 1924
- Council seat: Gundagai
- Region: Riverina

Adjungbilly Shire was a local government area in the Riverina region of New South Wales, Australia.

Adjungbilly Shire was proclaimed on 7 March 1906. In 1910, the Shire was granted the powers of a municipality in respect to the South Gundagai urban area.

The shire was amalgamated with the Municipality of Gundagai to form Gundagai Shire on 1 January 1924.
