= Waradgery Shire =

Former local government area in New South Wales, Australia

- Local government area
- Country: Australia
- State: New South Wales
- Region: Riverina
- Established: 7 May 1906
- Abolished: 1 January 1965
- Council seat: Hay, New South Wales

Waradgery Shire was a local government area in the Riverina region of New South Wales, Australia.

Waradgery Shire was established in 1906 and its offices were based in the town of Hay, New South Wales.

In 1965 Waradgery Shire was merged with the Municipality of Hay to form Hay Shire.
