= Wunnamurra Shire =

Former local government area in New South Wales, Australia

- Local government area
- Country: Australia
- State: New South Wales
- Region: Riverina
- Established: 7 March 1906
- Abolished: 31 December 1918
- Council seat: Jerilderie

Wunnamurra Shire was a local government area in the Riverina region of New South Wales, Australia. The Wannamurra Shire was established in 1906, incorporating the area around the town of Jerilderie.

As early as 1908, the Wunnamurra Shire and the Municipality of Jerilderie had agreed in principle to an amalgamation. However, it was not until 1918 that Wunnamurra Shire was merged with the Municipality of Jerilderie to form Jerilderie Shire.
