= Harwood Shire =

Former local government area in New South Wales, Australia

Harwood Shire New South Wales
- Established: 7 March 1906
- Abolished: 1 January 1957
- Council seat: Maclean
- Region: Northern Rivers

Harwood Shire was a local government area in the Northern Rivers region of New South Wales, Australia.

Harwood Shire was proclaimed on 7 March 1906, one of 134 shires created after the passing of the Local Government (Shires) Act 1905.

The shire offices were in Maclean. Other towns and villages in the shire included Angourie, Ashby, Iluka, Lawrence and Yamba.

Harwood Shire was amalgamated with Municipality of Maclean to form Maclean Shire on 1 January 1957.
