= Jindalee Shire =

Former local government area in New South Wales, Australia

- Local government area
- Country: Australia
- State: New South Wales
- Region: Riverina
- Established: 7 March 1906
- Abolished: 1 April 1975
- Council seat: Cootamundra

Jindalee Shire was a local government area in the Riverina region of New South Wales, Australia.

Jindalee Shire was proclaimed as Cowcumballa Shire on 7 March,1906, one of 134 shires created after the passing of the Local Government (Shires) Act 1905. It was renamed Jindalee Shire on 13 March, 1907. On 17 September, 1935, it absorbed part of the abolished Municipality of Wallendbeen.

Initially, the shire shared an office with the Municipality of Cootamundra until moving into its own offices elsewhere in Cootamundra in 1946. Urban areas in the shire included Stockinbingal, Wallendbeen and the village of Frampton.

The shire amalgamated with the Municipality of Cootamundra to form Cootamundra Shire on 1 April,1975.
