= Macquarie Shire =

Former local government area in New South Wales, Australia

Macquarie Shire New South Wales
- Established: 7 March 1906
- Abolished: 1 January 1950
- Council seat: Wellington
- Region: Orana

Macquarie Shire was a local government area in the Orana region of New South Wales, Australia.

Macquarie Shire was proclaimed on 7 March 1906, one of 134 shires created after the passing of the Local Government (Shires) Act 1905.

The shire office was in Wellington. Other towns and villages in the shire included Stuart Town.

Macquarie Shire was amalgamated on 1 January 1950 with the Municipality of Wellington and part of Cobbora Shire to form Wellington Shire.
