= Cobbora Shire =

Former local government area in New South Wales, Australia

Cobborah Shire New South Wales
- Established: 7 March 1906
- Abolished: 1 January 1950
- Council seat: Geurie
- Region: Orana

Cobbora Shire was a local government area in the Orana region of New South Wales, Australia.

Cobbora Shire was proclaimed (as Cobborah Shire) on 7 March 1906, one of 134 shires created after the passing of the Local Government (Shires) Act 1905. It was renamed Cobbora Shire on 23 April 1907.

The shire office was in Geurie. Other towns and villages in the shire included Dunedoo and Mendooran.

Cobborah Shire was abolished and split on 1 January 1950 with part merged with the Municipality of Wellington and Macquarie Shire to form Wellington Shire and the balance absorbed into Gulgong Shire.
