= Boomi Shire =

Former local government area in New South Wales, Australia

Boomi Shire New South Wales
- Established: 7 March 1906
- Abolished: 1 January 1981
- Council seat: Moree
- Region: North West Slopes

Boomi Shire was a local government area in the North West Slopes region of New South Wales, Australia.

Boomi Shire was proclaimed on 7 March 1906, one of 134 shires created after the passing of the Local Government (Shires) Act 1905.

The shire offices were in Moree. Towns in the shire included Boomi, Ashley, Garah and Mungindi.

Boomi Shire was amalgamated with Boolooroo Shire and Municipality of Moree to form Moree Plains Shire on 1 January 1981 per the Local Government Areas Amalgamation Act 1980.
