= Tomki Shire =

Former local government area in New South Wales, Australia

Tomki Shire New South Wales
- Established: 7 March 1906
- Abolished: 1 January 1976
- Council seat: Casino
- Region: Northern Rivers

Tomki Shire was a local government area in the Northern Rivers region of New South Wales, Australia.

Tomki Shire was proclaimed on 7 March 1906, one of 134 shires created after the passing of the Local Government (Shires) Act 1905.

The shire offices were in Casino. Other towns and villages in the shire included Rappville.

Tomki Shire was abolished and split on 1 January 1976 with part absorbed by the Municipality of Casino and part merged with Woodburn Shire to form Richmond River Shire.
