= Murrungal Shire =

Former local government area in New South Wales, Australia

Murrungal Shire New South Wales
- Established: 7 March 1906
- Abolished: 1 January 1944
- Council seat: Boorowa
- Region: South West Slopes

Murrungal Shire was a local government area in the South West Slopes region of New South Wales, Australia.

Murrungal Shire was proclaimed on 7 March 1906, one of 134 shires created after the passing of the Local Government (Shires) Act 1905.

The shire office was in Boorowa. Towns and villages in the shire included Frogmore, Reids Flat, Rugby and Rye Park.

Murrungal Shire was amalgamated with the Municipality of Burrowa to form Boorowa Shire on 1 September 1944.
