= Clyde Shire =

Former local government area in New South Wales, Australia

Clyde Shire New South Wales
- Established: 7 March 1906
- Abolished: 1 July 1948
- Council seat: Tomerong
- Region: South Coast

Clyde Shire was a local government area in the South Coast region of New South Wales, Australia.

Clyde Shire was proclaimed on 7 March 1906, one of 134 shires created after the passing of the Local Government (Shires) Act 1905.

The shire offices were in Tomerong. Other urban areas in the shire included Huskisson and Sussex Inlet.

The shire was amalgamated with the Municipality of Berry, Municipality of South Shoalhaven, Municipality of Broughton Vale, Municipality of Ulladulla, Municipality of Nowra and Camberwarra Shire to form Shoalhaven Shire on 1 July 1948.
