= Demondrille Shire =

Former local government area in New South Wales, Australia

- Local government area
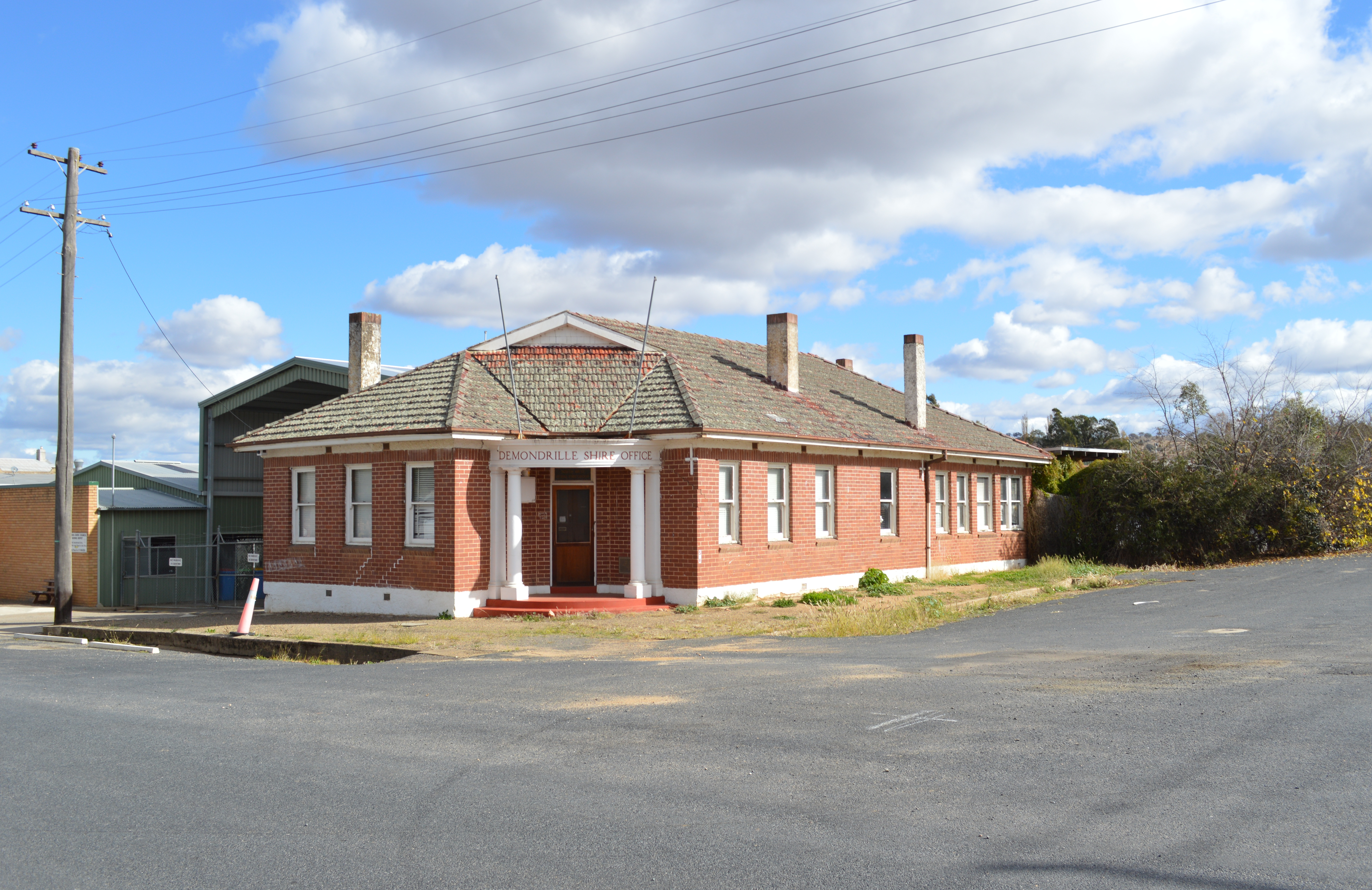
- The former Demondrille Shire offices in Murrumburrah
- Country: Australia
- State: New South Wales
- Region: South West Slopes
- Established: 16 June 1906
- Abolished: 1 January 1975
- Council seat: Murrumburrah

Demondrille Shire was a local government area in the South West Slopes region of New South Wales, Australia.

The Shire was established on 7 March 1906 and its offices were based in the town of Murrumburrah but the Harden-Murrumburrah urban area was not in Demondrille Shire. The area covered by the shire was unincorporated prior to its creation. In 1975 Demondrille Shire was merged with the Municipality of Murrumburrah to form Harden Shire.
