= Municipality of Broughton's Vale =

Former local government area in New South Wales, Australia

Municipality of Broughton’s Vale New South Wales
- Established: 24 April 1871
- Abolished: 1 July 1948

The Municipality of Broughton's Vale was a municipality of New South Wales that existed from 1871 to 1948.

The Municipality of Broughton's Vale was originally part of the Gerrigong Ward of the Municipality of Kiama. However, a petition that was presented to the Governor proposed the separation of the Gerrigong Ward from the Municipality of Kiama and for the Ward to be divided into two separate and distinct municipalities: Broughton's Vale and Gerringong.
