= Gundagai Shire =

Former local government area in New South Wales, Australia

- Local government area
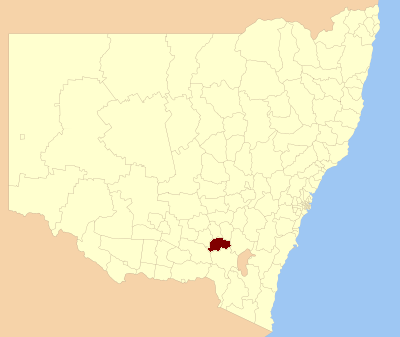
- Location in New South Wales
- Coordinates: 35°04′S 148°07′E
- Country: Australia
- State: New South Wales
- Region: Riverina
- Established: 1 January 1924
- Abolished: 12 May 2016
- Council seat: Gundagai

Government
  - Mayor: Abb McAlister (Unaligned)
  - State electorate: Cootamundra
  - Federal division: Riverina

Area
  - Total: 2,457 km^{2} (949 sq mi)

Population
  - Total: 3,747 (2013 est)
  - Density: 1.5250/km^{2} (3.9498/sq mi)
- Website: Gundagai Shire
LGAs around Gundagai Shire
Junee	Cootamundra	Harden
Wagga Wagga	Gundagai Shire	Yass Valley
Wagga Wagga	Tumut	Tumut

Gundagai Shire was a local government area in the Riverina region of New South Wales, Australia. On 12 May 2016, Gundagai Shire was abolished and merged with the neighbouring Cootamundra Shire to establish Cootamundra-Gundagai Regional Council.

The Shire was located adjacent to the Hume Highway. Gundagai Shire is primarily rural, with a small population. 80% of the Shire's population live in the town of Gundagai. The four villages in the Shire were Coolac, Tumblong, Muttama and Nangus, with populations ranging from 40 to 90 people.

The last Mayor of Gundagai Shire was Abb McAlister, an unaligned politician.

== History ==
Gundagai was declared a Municipality in 1889, and Adjungbilly Shire Council created in 1906 to administer the district. The Municipality of Gundagai and the Adjungbilly Shire were amalgamated on 1 January 1924 to form the Gundagai Shire Council, which was the administrative body of the area.

A 2015 review of local government boundaries recommended that Gundagai Shire merge with adjoining councils. The NSW Government considered two proposals. The first proposed a merger between the Gundagai and Cootamundra shires to form a new council with an area of 3,981 square kilometres (1,537 sq mi) and support a population of approximately 11,500. The alternative, proposed by Harden Shire on 28 February 2016, was for an amalgamation of the Cootamundra, Gundagai and Harden shires. Following an independent review, on 12 May 2016 the Minister for Local Government announced the dissolution of the Cootamunda and Gundagai shires, with their area merging to establish the Gundagai Council. After the merger was gazetted, opposition continued through a Facebook page.

== Council ==
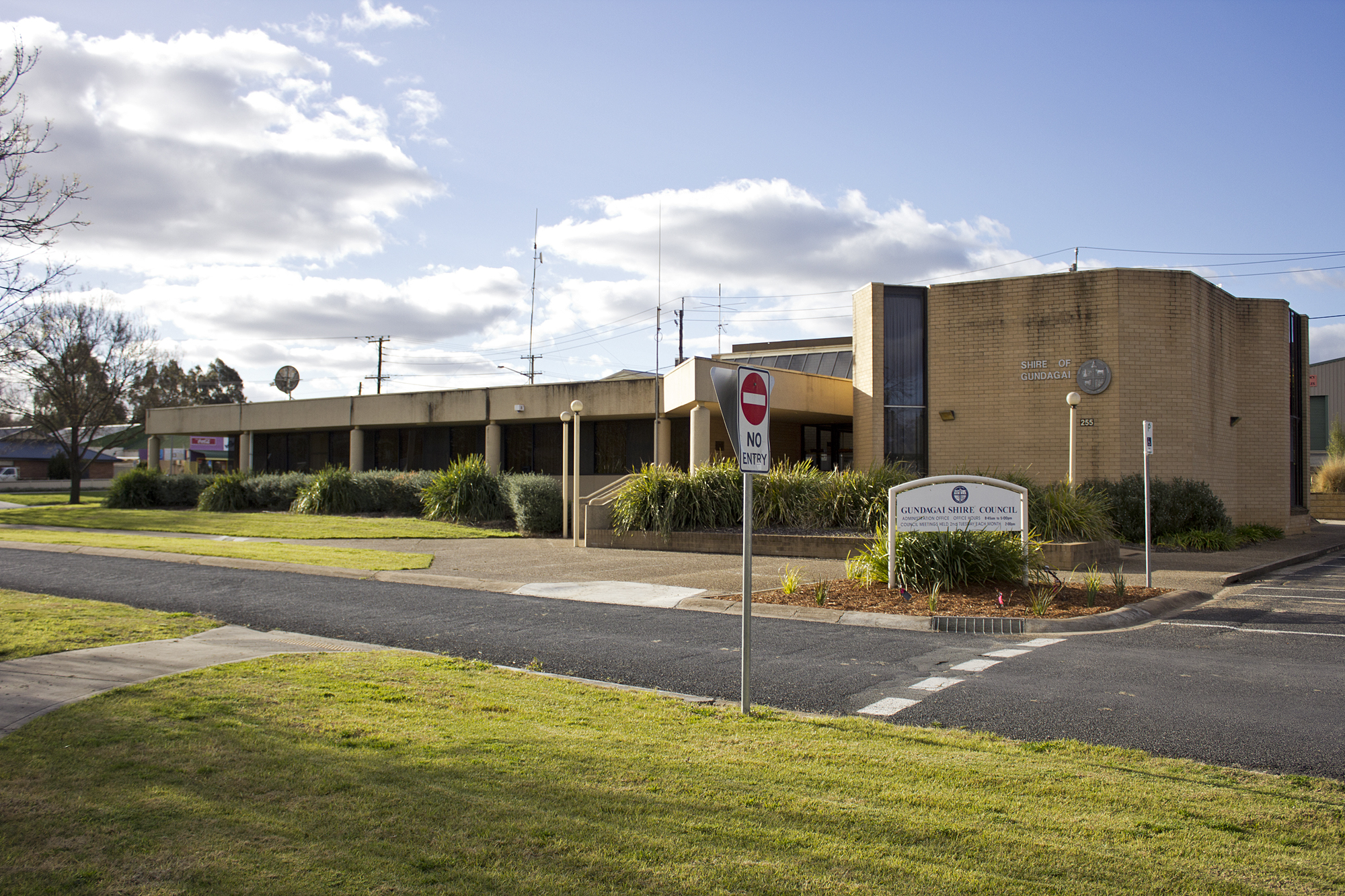
Gundagai Shire Council Chambers

In 1952 Gundagai Shire Council won a coveted A.R. Bluett Memorial Award for progress.

During 2011 Gundagai Shire Council was one of 110 state and local council authorities where employees were under investigation by the Independent Commission Against Corruption as part of Operation Jarek. It was claimed that employees of some state and local authorities had accepted benefits including gift cards and other items from companies in return for placing orders and continuing business relationships with these companies.

=== Composition and election method ===
Gundagai Shire Council was composed of eight councillors elected proportionally from a single ward. All councillors were elected for fixed four-year terms of office. The mayor was elected by the councillors at the first meeting of the council. The last election was held on 8 September 2012, and the makeup of the council was as follows:

Party	Councillors
Independents and Unaligned	8
Total	8

The last Council, elected in 2012, in order of election, was:

Councillor	Party	Notes
Abb McAlister	Unaligned	Mayor
Ron Moses	Unaligned	
Mike Kingwill	Independent	
Peter Gain	Independent	
David Graham	Unaligned	Deputy Mayor
Mason Crane	Unaligned	
Ronnie Magnone	Unaligned	
Peter Batey	Independent	
