= Dumaresq Shire =

Former local government area in New South Wales, Australia

Dumaresq Shire New South Wales
- Established: 7 March 1906
- Abolished: 21 February 2000
- Council seat: Armidale
- Region: New England

Dumaresq Shire was a local government area in the New England region of New South Wales, Australia.

Dumaresq Shire was proclaimed on 7 March 1906, one of 134 shires created after the passing of the Local Government (Shires) Act 1905.

The shire office was in Armidale. Towns and villages in the shire included Ebor, Hillgrove and Wollomombi.

Dumaresq Shire was amalgamated with the City of Armidale to form Armidale Dumaresq Council on 21 February 2000.
