= Richmond River Shire =

Former local government area in New South Wales, Australia

Richmond River Shire New South Wales
- Established: 1 January 1976
- Abolished: 21 February 2000
- Region: Northern Rivers

Richmond River Shire was a local government area in the Northern Rivers region of New South Wales, Australia.

It was established on 1 January 1976 after the amalgamation of Tomki Shire and Woodburn Shire.

Richmond River Shire amalgamated with the Municipality of Casino to establish the Richmond Valley Council on 21 February 2000.
