= Municipality of Concord =

Former local government area in New South Wales, Australia

- Local government area
- Country: Australia
- State: New South Wales
- Established: 11 August 1883
- Abolished: 1 December 2000
- Council seat: Concord Council Chambers, Concord

Area
  - Total: 11.6 km^{2} (4.5 sq mi)

Population
  - Total: 23,644 (1996 census)
  - Density: 2,038/km^{2} (5,279/sq mi)
LGAs around Municipality of Concord
	Ryde
Lidcombe/ Auburn	Municipality of Concord	Drummoyne
Strathfield		Burwood

The Municipality of Concord was a local government area of Sydney, New South Wales, Australia. It was proclaimed as a municipality on 11 August 1883, and covered the suburbs of Cabarita, Concord, Concord West, Liberty Grove, Mortlake, North Strathfield and Rhodes. In 2000, it merged with Drummoyne Council to become the City of Canada Bay Council.
