= Nymboida Shire =

Former local government area in New South Wales, Australia

Nymboida Shire New South Wales
- Population: 4,354 (1996 census)
  - Density: 0.85675/km^{2} (2.2190/sq mi)
- Established: 6 August 1913
- Abolished: 1 July 2000
- Area: 5,082 km^{2} (1,962.2 sq mi)
- Council seat: Council Chambers; Cnr. Wharf & Through Streets; South Grafton
- Region: Northern Rivers

The Shire of Nymboida was a local government area in the Clarence valley of New South Wales between 1913 and 2000.

The shire was proclaimed on the 6 August 1913 out of the north-western parts of Dorrigo Shire. Its boundaries were modified in November and December 1917, and again in 1956.

The shire offices were located in South Grafton. Aside from Nymboida, significant settlements in the shire included Coutts Crossing, Dundurrabin, Hernani, and Jackadgery. In 1999, the total area of the shire was 5,082 square kilometres (1,962 sq mi).

On 1 July 2000, the shire voluntarily merged with the neighbouring Ulmarra Shire to form the Pristine Waters Council. This merged entity proved to be short-lived, and was merged with the other local government areas in the Clarence to form the Clarence Valley Council in 2004.
