= City of Armidale =

Former local government area in New South Wales

The City of Armidale was a local government area in the New England region of New South Wales, Australia, encompassing the regional city of Armidale from 1863 to 2000.

It was proclaimed as the Municipality of Armidale on 13 November 1863 by Governor Sir John Young. The first aldermen were elected at a public meeting in the Armidale courthouse in December 1863, and the first mayor elected in January 1864. The number of aldermen was increased from six to nine in September 1868.

It became the City of Armidale when it was deemed to be a city in March 1885. The boundaries of the city were expanded in 1960 to include areas formerly part of the surrounding Dumaresq Shire.

The City of Armidale was amalgamated with Dumaresq Shire to form Armidale Dumaresq Council on 21 February 2000.

== Mayors of Armidale ==
The mayors of the municipality were:

- George Allingham (1863-1864)
- Thomas Bryan Fitzgerald (1865)
- John Moore (1866)
- Thomas Bryan Fitzgerald (1867-1868)
- James McLean (1869)
- Thomas John Oliver (1870)
- Bernard Naughten (1870)
- Peter Speare (1871)
- Bernard Naughten (1872)
- John Moore (1873-1875)
- James E. Salmon (1876)
- William Proctor (1877-1879)
- Alexander Richardson (1880-1881)
- John Moore (1882-1885)
- Albert W. Simpson (1886)
- George Holmes (1887)
- William Butler (1888)
- John Trim (1889)
- Charles Wilson (1890)
- William Drew (1891-1892)
- William Murray (1893)
- Charles Wilson (1894-1895)
- George Wigan (1896-1897)
- John B. Fitzgerald (1898-1899)
- David P. Claverie (1900-1901)
- Charles Wilson (1902)
- William H. Watson (1903)
- William Cyril Higinbotham (1904)
- David P. Claverie (1905)
- James Jones (1906)
- William Cyril Higinbotham (1906)
- James Jones (1906-1907)
- James P. Bonnar (1907)
- Charles Wilson (1908)
- Walter J. Hawke (1909)
- William Curtis (1910)
- Walter David Solomons (1911-1912)
- James A. Glass (1912)
- Sydney Kearney (1913)
- Herbert Lane (1914-1915)
- William Curtis (1916)
- Alfred Purkiss (1917-1918)
- Walter J. Hawke (1919)
- William Curtis (1920)
- Alfred Purkiss (1921-1922)
- Morgan Stephens (1923-1927)
- Alleine Horner Fletcher (1928)
- William H. Watson (1929-1932)
- Moses H. O’Connor (1933-1937)
- William H. McBean (1938-1941)
- Dalrymple D. H. Fayle (1942)
- Leonard E. Dawson (1943-1944)
- Dalrymple D. H. Fayle (1945-1948)
- Leonard E. Dawson (1949-1950)
- William P. Ryan (1951)
- Thomas Monckton (1952)
- William P. Ryan (1953)
- Davis Hughes (1954-1956)
- Cyril Carey (1957)
- Percy G. Love (1958-1961)
- Lloyd St Clair Piddington (1963-1968)
- John W. Failes (1969-1972)
- Douglas Hewitt (1973-1974)
- Peter Poggioli (1975-1977)
- Douglas Hewitt (1978-1979)
- Claude Cainero (1979-1983)
- Douglas Hewitt (1983-1986)
- Antony C. Deakin (1987)
- Rosemary Leitch (1988-1993)
- Joe Harrold (1994-1995)
- Richard Torbay (1996-2000)
