= Murrurundi Shire =

Former local government area in New South Wales, Australia

Murrurundi Shire was a local government area, centred on the town of Murrurundi, New South Wales, Australia. It was abolished by amalgamation in 2004, with the parts of the shire north of the Liverpool Range being incorporated into the new Liverpool Plains Shire, and the part of the shire south of the Liverpool Range, including the town of Murrurundi, merged into the new Upper Hunter Shire.
