= Parry Shire =

Former local government area in New South Wales, Australia

Parry Shire was a local government area in New South Wales, Australia.

The former Parry Shire was located in the Liverpool Plains region and covered a broad area of countryside, south and east of the city of Tamworth. It did not include any major town, but had several villages. Parry Shire was formed in 1980 by the amalgamation of the former Peel Shire and Cockburn Shire. Part of the Peel Shire area was re-allocated to the growing City of Tamworth area at that time. Parry Shire was named because it occupied most of the land of Parry County, one of the cadastral ( survey and land registration ) divisions of New South Wales. Parry County was named after Sir William Edward Parry, a director of the Australian Agricultural Company, an early major landholder in the area.

Parry Shire was abolished in a local government restructuring in 2004. Most of the shire was incorporated into the new Tamworth Regional Council and the southern part was included in the new Liverpool Plains Shire.
