= Copmanhurst Shire =

Former local government area in New South Wales, Australia

- Local government area
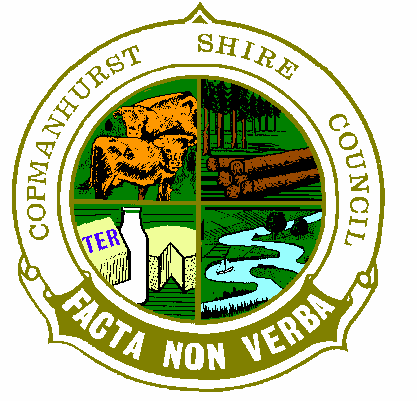
- Country: Australia
- State: New South Wales
- Region: Northern Rivers
- Established: 7 March 1906
- Abolished: 25 February 2004
- Council seat: Grafton

Copmanhurst Shire was a local government area in the Northern Rivers region of New South Wales, Australia.

Copmanhurst Shire was proclaimed on 7 March 1906, one of 134 shires created after the passing of the Local Government (Shires) Act 1905.

The shire offices were in Grafton. Other towns and villages in the shire included Copmanhurst and Myrtle.

Copmanhurst Shire was abolished and split on 25 February 2004 with part merged with Maclean Shire, City of Grafton and Pristine Waters Shire to create Clarence Valley Council and the balance merged with Richmond River Council.
