= Electoral results for the district of West Maitland =

Election results for West Maitland, New South Wales, Australia

West Maitland, an electoral district of the Legislative Assembly in the Australian state of New South Wales was created in 1859 and abolished in 1904.

Election	Member	Party
1859	Elias Weekes	None
1860	Elias Weekes	None
1864	Benjamin Lee	None
1869	Benjamin Lee	None
1872	Benjamin Lee	None
1874 by	Lewis Levy	None
1874	Henry Cohen	None
1877	Henry Cohen	None
1880	James Fulford	None
1882	Henry Cohen	None
1885	Richard Thompson	None
1887	Richard Thompson	Free Trade
1891	John Gillies	Free Trade
1894	John Gillies	Ind. Free Trade
1895	John Gillies	Free Trade
1898	John Gillies	Free Trade
1901	John Gillies	Independent

== Election results ==
=== Elections in the 1900s ===
==== 1901 ====
1901 New South Wales state election: West Maitland
Party	Candidate	Votes	%	±%
Independent	John Gillies	903	78.8	+14.0
Independent	Richard Proctor	243	21.2	
Total formal votes		1,146	99.7	+0.4
Informal votes		4	0.4	−0.4
Turnout		1,150	45.5	−25.1
Member changed to Independent from Liberal Reform				

=== Elections in the 1890s ===
==== 1898 ====
1898 New South Wales colonial election: West Maitland
Party	Candidate	Votes	%	±%
Free Trade	John Gillies	1,141	64.8	
National Federal	Walter Edmunds	620	35.2	
Total formal votes		1,761	99.3	
Informal votes		13	0.7	
Turnout		1,774	70.6	
Free Trade hold				

==== 1895 ====
1895 New South Wales colonial election: West Maitland
Party	Candidate	Votes	%	±%
Free Trade	John Gillies	890	80.5	
Ind. Protectionist	Richard Proctor	215	19.5	
Total formal votes		1,105	99.1	
Informal votes		10	0.9	
Turnout		1,115	47.3	
Member changed to Free Trade from Ind. Free Trade				

==== 1894 ====
1894 New South Wales colonial election: West Maitland
Party	Candidate	Votes	%	±%
Ind. Free Trade	John Gillies	1,247	63.9	
Free Trade	Robert Scobie	618	31.6	
Independent Labour	Richard Proctor	81	4.2	
Ind. Protectionist	Arthur Payne	7	0.4	
Total formal votes		1,953	98.4	
Informal votes		32	1.6	
Turnout		1,985	83.2	
Member changed to Ind. Free Trade from Free Trade				

==== 1891 ====
1891 New South Wales colonial election: West Maitland Wednesday 17 June
Party	Candidate	Votes	%	±%
Free Trade	John Gillies (elected)	670	52.7	
Free Trade	Richard Thompson (defeated)	459	36.1	
Protectionist	Hugh Lusk	143	11.2	
Total formal votes		1,272	97.5	
Informal votes		33	2.5	
Turnout		1,305	80.2	
Free Trade hold				

=== Elections in the 1880s ===
==== 1889 ====
1889 New South Wales colonial election: West Maitland Saturday 9 February
Party	Candidate	Votes	%	±%
Free Trade	Richard Thompson (elected)	754	69.2	
Protectionist	Thomas Hungerford	335	30.8	
Total formal votes		1,089	98.1	
Informal votes		21	1.9	
Turnout		1,110	59.6	
Free Trade hold				

==== 1887 ====
1887 New South Wales colonial election: West Maitland Wednesday 9 February
Party	Candidate	Votes	%	±%
Free Trade	Richard Thompson (re-elected)	unopposed		

==== 1885 ====
1885 New South Wales colonial election: West Maitland Friday 16 October
Candidate	Votes	%
Richard Thompson (elected)	632	54.5
Walter Edmunds	527	45.5
Total formal votes	1,159	97.0
Informal votes	36	3.0
Turnout	1,195	72.6

==== 1882 ====
1882 New South Wales colonial election: West Maitland Thursday 7 December
Candidate	Votes	%
Henry Cohen (elected)	564	59.8
Richard Thompson	380	40.3
Total formal votes	944	99.1
Informal votes	9	0.9
Turnout	953	78.5

==== 1880 ====
1880 New South Wales colonial election: West Maitland Thursday 25 November
Candidate	Votes	%
James Fulford (elected)	612	58.6
Henry Cohen (defeated)	432	41.4
Total formal votes	1,044	98.1
Informal votes	20	1.9
Turnout	1,064	87.0

=== Elections in the 1870s ===
==== 1877 ====
1877 New South Wales colonial election: West Maitland Wednesday 31 October
Candidate	Votes	%
Henry Cohen (re-elected)	397	55.6
James Pritchard	304	42.6
Thomas Hungerford	7	1.0
Thomas Jones	6	0.8
Total formal votes	714	98.2
Informal votes	13	1.8
Turnout	727	67.2

==== 1874 ====
1874–75 New South Wales colonial election: West Maitland Monday 21 December 1874
Candidate	Votes	%
Henry Cohen (elected)	343	49.2
Joseph Eckford	196	28.1
Archibald Hamilton	152	21.8
William Farthing	5	0.7
William Brooks	1	0.1
Total formal votes	697	98.0
Informal votes	14	2.0
Turnout	711	67.9

==== 1874 by-election ====
1874 West Maitland by-election Tuesday 4 August
Candidate	Votes	%
Lewis Levy (elected)	647	80.1
Archibald Hamilton	129	19.9
Total formal votes	647	97.9
Informal votes	14	2.1
Turnout	661	63.1

Benjamin Lee resigned.

==== 1872 ====
1872 New South Wales colonial election: West Maitland Tuesday 5 March
Candidate	Votes	%
Benjamin Lee (re-elected)	504	58.3
Joseph Eckford	267	30.9
Archibald Hamilton	93	10.8
Total formal votes	864	98.2
Informal votes	16	1.8
Turnout	880	77.0

=== Elections in the 1860s ===
==== 1869 ====
1869–70 New South Wales colonial election: West Maitland Monday 20 December 1869
Candidate	Votes	%
Benjamin Lee (re-elected)	488	58.6
Andrew Liddell	345	41.4
Total formal votes	833	100.0
Informal votes	0	0.0
Turnout	833	75.2

==== 1864 ====
1864–65 New South Wales colonial election: West Maitland Tuesday 13 December 1864
Candidate	Votes	%
Benjamin Lee (elected)	444	50.9
Peter Green	328	37.6
Andrew Liddell	100	11.5
George Rochester	1	0.1
Total formal votes	873	97.9
Informal votes	19	2.1
Turnout	891	71.5

==== 1860 ====
1860 New South Wales colonial election: West Maitland Tuesday 18 December
Candidate	Votes	%
Elias Weekes (re-elected)	473	90.1
William Cheater	52	9.9
Total formal votes	525	100.0
Informal votes	0	0.0
Turnout	525	37.3

=== Elections in the 1850s ===
==== 1859 ====
1859 New South Wales colonial election: West Maitland Tuesday 21 June
Candidate	Votes	%
Elias Weekes (re-elected)	unopposed	
