= 1874 West Maitland colonial by-election =

By-election in New South Wales, Australia

A by-election was held for the New South Wales Legislative Assembly electorate of West Maitland on 4 August 1874 because Benjamin Lee resigned.

== Dates ==
Date	Event
20 July 1874	Benjamin Lee resigned.
22 July 1874	Writ of election issued by the Speaker of the Legislative Assembly.
3 August 1874	Nominations
4 August 1874	Polling day
31 August 1874	Return of writ

== Result ==
1874 West Maitland by-election Tuesday 4 August
Candidate	Votes	%
Lewis Levy (elected)	647	80.1
Archibald Hamilton	129	19.9
Total formal votes	647	97.9
Informal votes	14	2.1
Turnout	661	63.1

== See also ==
- Electoral results for the district of West Maitland
- List of New South Wales state by-elections
