= Municipality of Granville =

Former local government area in New South Wales, Australia

- Local government area
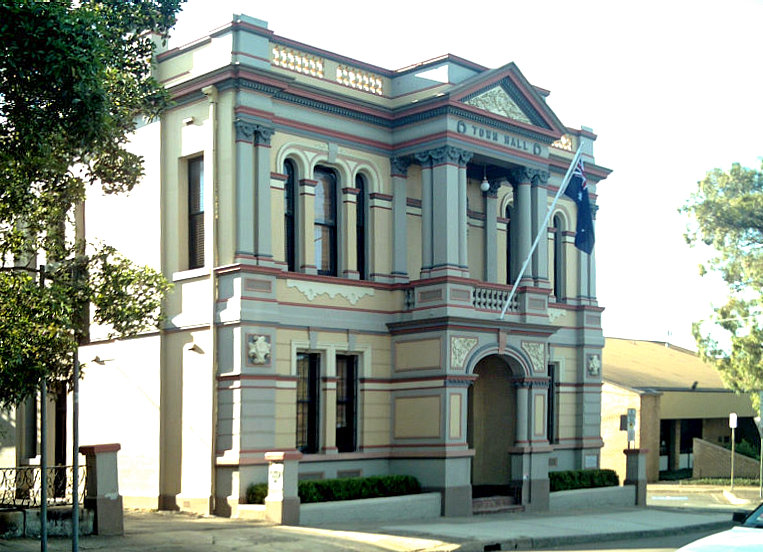
- Granville Town Hall on Carlton Street, Granville.
- Country: Australia
- State: New South Wales
- Region: Western Sydney
- Established: 20 January 1885
- Abolished: 31 December 1948
- Council seat: Granville Town Hall

Area
  - Total: 12.4 km^{2} (4.8 sq mi)

Population
  - Total: 26,942 (1947 census)
  - Density: 2,173/km^{2} (5,627/sq mi)
- Parish: Liberty Plains; St John
LGAs around Municipality of Granville
Parramatta	Parramatta River	Auburn
Holroyd	Municipality of Granville	Auburn
Holroyd	Bankstown	Auburn

The Municipality of Granville was a local government area in the Western region of Sydney, New South Wales, Australia. The municipality was proclaimed as the Borough of Granville on 20 January 1885. It included the modern suburbs of Granville, South Granville, Camellia, Rosehill, Clyde and parts of Harris Park, Guildford and Merrylands. From 1 January 1949, the council was amalgamated into the City of Parramatta, with the passing of the Local Government (Areas) Act 1948.

== Council history ==
=== Early years and development ===
The area was first incorporated on 20 January 1885, when the Governor of New South Wales, Lord Augustus Loftus, proclaimed the "Borough of Granville". Alban Gee was appointed the first returning officer for the council election on 18 March 1885, with nine aldermen elected at-large.

Alderman	Notes
Harry Richardson	Railway Superintendent, later Commissioner.
James Niblett	Died on 13 May 1885.
John Nobbs	First Mayor.
Lucien Grimwood	Auctioneer, Prospect Street, Granville.
John Scarborough	Real estate agent, later Town Clerk (1888–1912).
William John Baker	Farmer and Fruitgrower, Woodville Road, Granville.
Ralph Richardson	Railway Superintendent.
William Ritchie	Agricultural Implement Manufacturer, East Street South, Granville.
Robert Hudson	Engineer, railway rolling-stock manufacturer, director of Hudson Bros. Ltd.
William Thackray	Elected 13 June 1885 to replace James Niblett, deceased. Appointed Overseer of Works and Inspector of Nuisances, 1888.

The prominent conveyancer and local landowner behind Granville's incorporation, John Nobbs, was elected the first mayor, and John Southwood Beach was appointed first Town Clerk at the Council's first meeting on 27 March 1885. Although the first council was elected at-large, from 25 May 1887 the council was divided into three wards: East, North and West. South Ward was added on 29 December 1891, bringing the number of aldermen to twelve. Granville's central location for the railways meant that industrial development became more important to the area, with an 1888 profile of the borough noting "A very large number of important industries, employing in the aggregate quite an army of mechanics, exists in the borough."

Effective 26 February 1906, a five square kilometre area south of Granville Road, bounded by Prospect and Sherwood to the west (the Southern Rail line) and Auburn to the east (Duck River), and south to the Sydney water supply pipeline forming the northern boundary of Bankstown, was added to the South Ward. From 28 December 1906, following the passing of the Local Government Act, 1906, the council was renamed as the "Municipality of Granville". On 3 May 1922, the ward system was abolished.

=== Council seat ===
Granville Borough Council first met in temporary premises, including at the 1884 Granville School of Arts on Good Street. Soon however, a site in the Lea Estate facing Carlton Street was purchased for a Town Hall, with work commencing in 1888. Architect Charles Assinder Harding of Sydney designed the Town Hall, and Banks & Whitehurst were the contractors.

The foundation stone was laid by John Nobbs on 5 September 1888 and was officially opened on 16 January 1889. An auditorium was added to the Town Hall in 1900, designed by James Whitmore Hill of Parramatta, and officially opened on 18 December 1900 by the Secretary for Public Works, E. W. O'Sullivan.

=== Later history ===
By the end of the Second World War, the NSW Government had realised that its ideas of infrastructure expansion could not be effected by the present system of the patchwork of small municipal councils across Sydney and the Minister for Local Government, Joseph Cahill, following the recommendations of the 1945–46 Clancy Royal Commission on Local Government Boundaries, passed a bill in 1948 that abolished a significant number of those councils. Under the Local Government (Areas) Act 1948 (effective 1 January 1949), Granville Municipal Council merged with the municipalities of Parramatta, Ermington & Rydalmere and Dundas to form the new City of Parramatta.

The Granville municipality became "Granville Ward", returning six aldermen. The regular council meetings of the new Parramatta City were held at the Granville Town Hall from 1948 until 1958, when the new Parramatta administration centre opened. In 1995 a reorganisation of Parramatta's wards resulted in Granville Ward being renamed "Woodville Ward" after Woodville Road while the former Granville Municipality suburbs of Harris Park, Rosehill, Camellia, and northern sections of Granville and Clyde, were moved into the Elizabeth Macarthur Ward. From 12 May 2016, the Woodville Ward became part of the new Cumberland Council.

== Mayors ==
Years	Mayor	Notes
27 March 1885 – 15 February 1886	John Nobbs	
15 February 1886 – 12 February 1887	Harry Richardson	
12 February 1887 – 15 February 1889	John Nobbs	
15 February 1889 – 13 February 1890	Charles Unwin	
13 February 1890 – 9 February 1892	Alban Gee	
9 February 1892 – 15 February 1894	John Richard Palmer	
15 February 1894 – 15 February 1895	Robert McAdam	
15 February 1895 – 15 February 1896	Joseph Thomas Spears	
15 February 1896 – 11 February 1897	Thomas Irons	
11 February 1897 – 10 February 1898	John Richard Palmer	
10 February 1898 – 23 February 1899	William Harcourt Windsor	
23 February 1899 – 15 February 1901	John Mahony	
15 February 1901 – 20 February 1902	Robert McAdam	
20 February 1902 – 12 February 1903	William Kay	
12 February 1903 – 10 February 1904	George Henry Lane	
10 February 1904 – 28 February 1907	Charles Townsend	
28 February 1907 – 3 February 1909	Dr. Alexander Livingstone Kerr	
3 February 1909 – 8 February 1910	Charles Townsend	
8 February 1910 – 31 January 1911	Dr. Alexander Livingstone Kerr	
31 January 1911 – 5 February 1912	John Colquhoun	
5 February 1912 – 4 February 1913	James Robert Charlton	
4 February 1913 – 10 February 1914	William West	
10 February 1914 – 9 February 1915	James Robert Charlton	
9 February 1915 – 8 February 1916	Charles Anthony Willoughby	
8 February 1916 – 10 July 1917	Hector Kirkpatrick	
10 July 1917 – 14 February 1919	Charles Townsend	
14 February 1919 – 3 February 1920	Henden John Epps	
3 February 1920 – 6 December 1921	John Colquhoun	
6 December 1921 – 5 December 1922	William Thomas Swift	
5 December 1922 – 4 December 1923	Henry Alfred Membrey	
4 December 1923 – 2 December 1924	Charles Townsend	
2 December 1924 – 10 December 1925	John Colquhoun	
10 December 1925 – 13 December 1927	Frederick Bowden	
13 December 1927 – 7 December 1928	William Shakespeare Kay	
7 December 1928 – 10 December 1929	Alexander McGill	
10 December 1929 – 4 December 1934	Henden John Epps	
4 December 1934 – 12 December 1939	John Sykes Fielding	
12 December 1939 – 9 December 1941	Claude Fleck	
9 December 1941 – 22 December 1942	Donald Sidney McFarlane (Labor)	
22 December 1942 – December 1943	William Karran Halsall (Labor)	
December 1943 – 7 December 1944	Michael Adams (Labor)	
7 December 1944 – 4 December 1945	Herbert Denley	
4 December 1945 – December 1947	Jasper Randolph Calov	
December 1947 – 31 December 1948	Harold Thomas Bradley	

== Town Clerks ==
Years	Town Clerk	Notes
27 March 1885 – 6 January 1887	John Southwood Beach	
6 January 1887 – 1 February 1887	George Parkin (acting)	
1 February 1887 – 19 January 1888	Andrew Innes Liddell	
19 January 1888 – 1 May 1912	John Scarborough	
1 May 1912 – 27 November 1917	Louis William Adams	
27 November 1917 – 8 February 1918	S. G. Burge (acting)	
8 February 1918 – 23 May 1920	William George Moffitt	
23 May 1920 – 31 December 1948	L. N. Sharp	
