= Municipality of Eastwood =

Former local government area in New South Wales, Australia

Municipality of Eastwood New South Wales
- Population: 4,108 (1947 census)
- Established: 2 June 1894
- Abolished: 31 December 1948
- Council seat: Eastwood Town Hall
- County: Cumberland
- Parish: Field of Mars
LGAs around Municipality of Eastwood:
Hornsby	Hornsby/Ku-ring-gai	Ku-ring-gai
Dundas	Municipality of Eastwood	Ryde
Dundas	Ryde	Ryde

The Municipality of Eastwood was a local government area in the Northern region of Sydney, New South Wales, Australia. Initially proclaimed as the southern part of the Municipal District of Ryde in 1870, following a petition of secession the municipality was proclaimed as the Municipal District of Marsfield on 2 June 1894. It included the modern suburbs of Marsfield, Eastwood, and Denistone. On 17 July 1907, the name of the council was changed to the "Municipality of Eastwood". From 1 January 1949, the council was re-amalgamated into the Municipality of Ryde, with the passing of the Local Government (Areas) Act 1948.

== Council history ==
=== Early years and development ===
The area comprising the future Eastwood municipality was first incorporated on 11 November 1870, when the Municipal District of Ryde was proclaimed in the lands north of Ryde. With a total land area of 40.6 square kilometres, Ryde was the largest Sydney municipality. However, due to an error in the proclamation regarding the western boundary, a new proclamation was made on 11 June 1872.

On 7 July 1893, a petition of 98 signatures was published in the NSW Government Gazette, requesting the division of the Marsfield and Eastwood areas and the establishment of a separate municipality. This petition was subsequently accepted and the area was proclaimed on 5 June 1894 as the "Municipal District of Marsfield". The first council, comprising six aldermen in two wards and two auditors, was elected on 9 August 1894.

Seat	Alderman	Notes
West Ward	Frederick Allan Baylis (ending February 1895)	
West Ward	Arthur Maurice Hyde Fitzhardinge (ending February 1896)	
West Ward	Charles Whittaker (ending February 1897)	
East Ward	John Frederick Jesson (ending February 1895)	
East Ward	Andrew Octavius Small (ending February 1896)	
East Ward	Edward Alpheus Sterland (ending February 1897)	
Auditor	Henry Lovell (ending February 1895)	
Auditor	Ernest Jurd (ending February 1895)	

The council first met on 15 August 1894 at the residence of Mr. J. Giuliani on the corner of Herring and Bridge Roads, Marsfield, with Alderman Arthur Fitzhardinge elected as the first mayor. On 5 September 1894, Sydney Small was appointed as the first Town Clerk.

With the review of local government regulations that would result in the Local Government Act, 1906 and would abolish to category of municipal districts, the council passed a resolution on 26 July 1906 requesting a change in the municipality to the "Municipality of Eastwood" in recognition of Eastwood as the main centre of the municipality. On 17 July 1907, the name change was officially proclaimed in the Government Gazette.

=== Later history ===
By the end of the Second World War, the NSW Government had realised that its ideas of infrastructure expansion could not be effected by the present system of the patchwork of small municipal councils across Sydney and the Minister for Local Government, Joseph Cahill, initiated the 1945–46 Clancy Royal Commission on Local Government Boundaries, to consider these changes. The NSW Government the passed a bill following the recommendations of the Royal Commission that abolished a significant number of Sydney metropolitan councils. Under the Local Government (Areas) Act 1948 (effective 1 January 1949), the council merged back into the Municipality of Ryde. The last meeting of the council was held on 22 December 1948.

== Council seat ==
The Council commissioned a purpose-built council chambers in 1911, with the foundation stone for the Eastwood Town Hall at 74 Agincourt Road, Marsfield, laid on 18 November 1911. The Town Hall was officially opened on 24 February 1912 by the Premier of New South Wales, James McGowen. The Town Hall was designed by architect Varney Parkes and was built by M. J. Geraghty. On 13 September 1937, the Town Hall was severely damaged by a fire, which destroyed a large number of Council records. It was later discovered that a former employee had set the fire. In March 1938, renovations to the Town Hall including to repair the fire damage were tendered by architect Louis P. Burns to builder D. E. Berecry of Chatswood. The hall was officially reopened on 30 July 1938. The Town Hall continues to be in the ownership of Ryde Council and is now a Heritage Item.

== Mayors ==
#	Mayors	Years	Notes
1	Arthur Maurice Hyde Fitzhardinge	15 August 1894 – 15 November 1895	
2	Henry Lovell	15 November 1895 – 9 February 1899	
3	Edwin Henry Small	9 February 1899 – 14 August 1899	
4	Alexander Adams	14 August 1899 – 17 February 1900	
5	Herbert Sparrow	17 February 1900 – 13 February 1901	
–	Edwin Henry Small	13 February 1901 – 5 July 1901	
6	Edward Gallagher	5 July 1901 – 12 February 1903	
–	Henry Lovell	12 February 1903 – 11 February 1904	
7	Charles Whittaker	11 February 1904 – 16 February 1905	
8	John Johnson	16 February 1905 – 10 February 1906	
9	Frank Ellis	10 February 1906 – 9 February 1907	
–	John Johnson	9 February 1907 – 1 March 1911	
10	Oswald Ernest Small	1 March 1911 – 9 February 1914	
11	John Churchman Matthews	9 February 1914 – 11 July 1917	
–	Charles Whittaker	11 July 1917 – 6 February 1918	
–	John Churchman Matthews	6 February 1918 – 11 February 1920	
12	John England	11 February 1920 – 22 December 1920	
–	John Churchman Matthews	22 December 1920 – 14 December 1921	
13	Gabriel Dunlop	14 December 1921 – 13 December 1922	
14	William Richard Featherstone	13 December 1922 – 17 December 1924	
15	Reginald Duthill Havelock Ball	17 December 1924 – 19 December 1927	
–	Gabriel Dunlop	19 December 1927 – 12 December 1928	
16	Sydney George Small	12 December 1928 – 11 December 1929	
17	Francis Myers	11 December 1929 – 10 December 1930	
–	John Churchman Matthews	10 December 1930 – 6 January 1932	
18	George Moore	6 January 1932 – 21 December 1932	
19	Reginald John Small	21 December 1932 – 6 September 1933	
20	Charles William Caudwell Pickford	13 September 1933 – 27 December 1933	
–	Reginald John Small	27 December 1933 – 5 December 1934	
–	Reginald Duthill Havelock Ball	5 December 1934 – 22 December 1936	
21	James Francis Walsh	28 December 1936 – December 1938	
–	Reginald Duthill Havelock Ball	December 1938 – December 1939	
22	Robert Francis Harris	December 1939 – December 1940	
23	James Henderson Martin	December 1940 – December 1941	
24	Edward F. Stewart	December 1941 – 31 December 1948	

== Town Clerks ==
Town Clerk	Years	Notes
Sydney George Small	5 September 1894 – 30 June 1923	
E. W. Fawcett	5 July 1923 – 14 April 1938	
E. C. Gyllies	14 April 1938 – 31 December 1948	
