= Local Government (Areas) Act 1948 =

Act of the Parliament of New South Wales

Parliament of New South Wales
- Long title: An Act to unite the City of Sydney and certain areas and to constitute the united area as a city; to unite certain other areas or areas and parts of areas and to constitute the united areas as municipalities; to reconstitute the Sydney County Council; to repeal the Sydney Corporation Act 1932, and certain other Acts; to amend the Local Government Act 1919, and certain other Acts in certain respects; and for purposes connected therewith.
- Citation: 1948 No. 30
- Enacted by: Parliament of New South Wales
- Royal assent: 3 September 1948
- Administered by: Department of Local Government
- Introduced by: Joseph Cahill

Repeals
- Sydney Corporation Act 1932

Related legislation
- Local Government Act 1919; Local Government Act 1993
- Status: Repealed

The Local Government (Areas) Act 1948 was a landmark New South Wales statute that was notable for its wide-ranging reforms for and amalgamations of the Local Government Areas of New South Wales within the County of Cumberland. Largely informed by the recommendations and findings of the 1945–46 Royal Commission on Local Government Boundaries, the act was written and presented to parliament by the Minister for Local Government in the NSW Government, Joseph Cahill.

== Bill ==
In the post-war period of infrastructure development, the Labor Party governments of William McKell and James McGirr, led by Cahill as local government minister, decided, following the recommendations of the 1945–46 Clancy Royal Commission on Local Government Boundaries, that Local Government reform would assist this process of improving state infrastructure and community facilities. This vision for a local government reform agenda, including large-scale amalgamations, was made clear during a speech in Wollongong in July 1946: "the government has decided to enquire into the possibility of making [Local Government] areas more comprehensive. I know there will be criticism and this is a very controversial subject, but I urge you to take the broad view. A council with a small income cannot provide for the essential requirements of its citizens. Remember councils are not isolated or individual units to-day, but are part of a composite whole. This country needs to be developed, and if we are to hold it we need not seven million people, but thirty-seven or for forty-seven million. We believe we have the potential wealth for such a population and a start has to be made in planning to accommodate them."

The final report of the Royal Commission initially recommended much more ambitious targets for amalgamations, including a City of Sydney that included all councils from Ashfield and Marrickville to Botany, Randwick and Vaucluse and north to include North Sydney and Mosman. A minority report authored by the third commissioner, Ronald Storey, the Mayor of Drummoyne, recommended reducing 66 councils to 34, a more modest target compared to the majority's recommendation of 66 to 18. A more ambitious plan to create eight entirely new cities in the County of Cumberland (known as the "Eight Cities Plan"), was progressed by the second commissioner, Stanley Haviland, and was seriously considered by state cabinet following the release of the commission's report in mid-1946. This plan, however, met with significant opposition from local government circles and the cabinet eventually decided in July 1947 on a plan for legislation to follow the first recommendation of reducing 66 councils to 14.

The text of the bill as passed by the Legislative Assembly originally set forth a reduction of the number of Sydney councils from 66 to 16. A gag on debate in the Legislative Assembly was used by the Government to prevent the opposition from trying to push through unfavourable amendments on this number within a specially convened select committee. The bill passed the assembly on 6 November 1947. However, to pass the Legislative Council, this number was reduced to 40 instead. however, Cahill's bill was not received without criticism from his own party, with the Labor Speaker of the Legislative Assembly, Bill Lamb, who was also the Member for Granville, making the unprecedented step of making representations in the committee stage of the bill, calling the bill a ""flagrant violation of the fundamental principles of the democratic system" which was a reference to the Council's decision to amalgamate Granville Council into Parramatta instead of the other way round.

== Effects of the Act ==
The act repealed the Sydney Corporation Act 1932 and for the first time made the City of Sydney, also significantly expanded with the abolition of several adjoining councils, subject to the main body of Local Government legislation in New South Wales, then constituted in the Local Government Act 1919. With the amalgamations, the act also necessitated a reconstitution of the Sydney County Council, with the electorates renumbered.

The specific amalgamations and their successors are listed here, from the schedule of the act:

Councils abolished	Council group
Alexandria, Darlington, Erskineville, The Glebe, Newtown, Paddington, Redfern, Waterloo	Sydney
Granville, Dundas, Ermington and Rydalmere	Parramatta
Castlereagh, St Marys, Nepean (A Riding)	Penrith
Cabramatta and Canley Vale	Fairfield
Ingleburn	Campbelltown
Nepean (C Riding)	Camden
Lidcombe	Auburn
Enfield (West Ward)	Strathfield
Enfield (Central and East Wards)	Burwood
St Peters, Petersham	Marrickville
Bexley	Rockdale
Annandale, Balmain	Leichhardt
Mascot	Botany
Richmond	Windsor
Eastwood	Ryde
Vaucluse	Woollahra
Nepean (B Riding)	Liverpool

== See also ==
- Greater Newcastle Act 1937
