= Municipality of Ermington and Rydalmere =

Former local government area in New South Wales, Australia

- Local government area
- Country: Australia
- State: New South Wales
- Established: 18 June 1891
- Abolished: 31 December 1948
- Council seat: Rydalmere Town Hall

Area
  - Total: 8.28 km^{2} (3.20 sq mi)

Population
  - Total: 3,298 (1947 census)
  - Density: 398.31/km^{2} (1,031.6/sq mi)
- Parish: Field of Mars
LGAs around Municipality of Ermington and Rydalmere
Parramatta	Dundas	Dundas
Parramatta	Municipality of Ermington and Rydalmere	Ryde
Granville	Parramatta River	Auburn

The Municipality of Ermington and Rydalmere was a local government area in the Western region of Sydney, New South Wales, Australia. Initially proclaimed as the southern part of the Borough of Dundas in 1889, following a petition of secession the municipality was proclaimed as the Municipal District of Ermington and Rydalmere on 18 June 1891. It included the modern suburbs of Rydalmere and parts of Dundas, Ermington and Melrose Park. From 1 January 1949, the council was amalgamated into the City of Parramatta, with the passing of the Local Government (Areas) Act 1948.

== Council history ==
=== Early years and development ===
The area consisting of the future Ermington-Rydalmere municipality was first incorporated on 23 March 1889, when the "Borough of Dundas" was proclaimed in the lands east of the Town of Parramatta. However this state of affairs was short-lived, when 94 residents submitted a petition to the NSW Government on 13 February 1891 requesting the creation of a separate municipality divided into two wards. This petition was subsequently accepted and the Governor of New South Wales, The Earl of Jersey, proclaimed the establishment of the "Municipal District of Ermington and Rydalmere" on 18 June 1891. On the separation, The Cumberland Argus and Fruitgrowers' Advocate, which had opposed the separation, noted: "There will be a good deal of weeping and wailing at Dundas in consequence; but, although we fought tooth and nail against the petitioners, we hope now to see the hatchet buried. Both municipalities must work together for their own good".

The first council, comprising six Aldermen in two wards, was first elected on 22 August 1891, with two auditors, Frederick Creswick and Samuel Dean Jack, elected on 15 August. The council first met on 24 August 1891, with Returning Officer, Walter Monckton, appointed acting town clerk.

Seat	Alderman	Notes
Rydalmere Ward	Thomas Williamson	
Rydalmere Ward	James Maloney	
Rydalmere Ward	Henry Jenkins	
Ermington Ward	Nelson Kirby	
Ermington Ward	William Thomas Spurway	
Ermington Ward	Joseph Stevens	

Thomas Williamson, who had led the separation petitioners, was elected the first mayor on 22 September 1891, and Ernest William Price was appointed first Town Clerk. A subsequent petition to re-amalgamate Ermington-Rydalmere with Dundas in 1898 was rejected by the council. From 28 December 1906, following the passing of the Local Government Act, 1906, the council was renamed as the "Municipality of Ermington and Rydalmere".

=== Council seat ===
The first public meetings and council meeting took place in the Rydalmere School of Arts on Victoria Road, Rydalmere. The Rydalmere School of Arts was designed by W. H. Monckton and officially opened by the Minister for Public Instruction, Joseph Carruthers, on 13 December 1890. The council continued to meet there and completed their purchase of the hall by March 1898, becoming known as the "Rydalmere Town Hall". Council subsequently commissioned various renovations and facade alterations to follow this acquisition.

In July 1946, the Town Hall was set on fire during an attempted robbery, resulting in the loss of many of the council's records, but it was quickly renovated and re-opened in November 1946. The Town Hall remained in council ownership following amalgamation in 1949 and survived into the 1960s but was later demolished to make way for a public park.

=== Later history ===
By the end of the Second World War, the NSW Government had realised that its ideas of infrastructure expansion could not be effected by the present system of the patchwork of small municipal councils across Sydney and the Minister for Local Government, Joseph Cahill, initiated the 1945–46 Clancy Royal Commission on Local Government Boundaries, to consider these changes. Ermington-Rydalmere and Dundas municipalities recognised this pressure by initiated procedures to amalgamate once more and Ermington-Rydalmere appointed A. T. Kay, Town Clerk of Dundas, as their acting town clerk in anticipation of this.

The NSW Government however passed a bill following the recommendations of the Royal Commission in 1948 that abolished a significant number of Sydney metropolitan councils. Pre-empted the actions of Dundas and Ermington-Rydalmere, under the Local Government (Areas) Act 1948 (effective 1 January 1949), both councils merged with the City of Parramatta to form the a new City of Parramatta.

The Ermington-Rydalmere municipality became "Ermington-Rydalmere Ward", returning two aldermen. In 1950 a reorganisation of Parramatta's wards resulted in the ward being absorbed into the Dundas Ward.

== Mayors ==
Years	Mayors	Notes
22 September 1891 – 25 February 1893	Thomas Williamson	
25 February 1893 – 13 February 1895	Nelson Kirby	
13 February 1895 – 11 February 1896	William Thomas Spurway	
11 February 1896 – 11 February 1897	Thomas Smith	
11 February 1897 – 5 October 1898	Henry Jenkins	
12 October 1898 – 20 June 1900	Thomas A. Humphreys	
25 June 1900 – 10 February 1903	Edgar Henry Swane	
10 February 1903 – 15 February 1905	Joseph Bogus	
15 February 1905 – 11 February 1907	William Allen Unicomb	
11 February 1907 – 11 October 1910	Joseph Bogus	
25 October 1910 – 5 February 1913	George Hughes	
5 February 1913 – 5 February 1915	Edgar Henry Swane	
5 February 1915 – 2 February 1916	George Hughes	
2 February 1916 – 4 July 1917	Samuel Dean Jack	
4 July 1917 – February 1920	Brian Doe	
February 1920 – 5 December 1921	George Hughes	
5 December 1921 – 3 December 1923	Thomas Adamson	
3 December 1923 – 15 December 1924	Joseph Rippon	
15 December 1924 – December 1925	J. H. Crowgey	
December 1925 – 12 December 1927	George Hughes	
12 December 1927 – 10 December 1928	Raymond Eaton Wassell	
10 December 1928 – 9 December 1929	Joseph Rippon	
9 December 1929 – 19 December 1932	Raymond Eaton Wassell	
19 December 1932 – 9 December 1935	Alfred Edward Maling	
9 December 1935 – 14 December 1936	John William Canice Dorahy	
14 December 1936 – December 1938	Stephen Arthur Bartlett	
December 1938 – December 1939	Rupert Clarence Pearce	
December 1939 – 2 December 1940	Stanley Woodward	
2 December 1940 – 14 December 1942	John William Canice Dorahy	
14 December 1942 – December 1943	Harold Eccles	
December 1943 – December 1945	Samuel Robert Bray	
December 1945 – 31 December 1948	Eric Aubrey Primrose	

== Town Clerks ==
Years	Town Clerk	Notes
24 August 1891 – September 1891	Walter Hillary Monckton (acting)	
September 1891 – 1 March 1898	Ernest William Price	
1 March 1898 – 19 May 1899	Nelson Kirby	
19 May 1899 – 2 December 1899	Henry Green	
2 December 1899 – 29 January 1915	Thomas Feather	
29 January 1915 – 31 August 1926	Edgar Henry Swane	
1 July 1926 – 22 November 1937	Edwin Rupert Henry Gillies	
22 November 1937 – April 1947	Andrew Fallon	
July 1947 – 31 December 1947	A. T. Kay (acting)	
