= Nepean Shire =

Former local government area in New South Wales, Australia

Nepean Shire New South Wales
- Established: 7 March 1906
- Abolished: 1 January 1949
- Council seat: Bringelly
- Region: Sydney

Nepean Shire was a local government area in Sydney in New South Wales, Australia.

Nepean Shire was proclaimed on 7 March 1906, one of 134 shires created after the passing of the Local Government (Shires) Act 1905. It absorbed the Municipality of Mulgoa on 1 July 1913.

The shire offices were in Bringelly.

The shire was abolished on 1 January 1949 and its area split per the Local Government (Areas) Act 1948. Riding A was absorbed along with Municipality of St Mary's and Municipality of Castlereagh into the Municipality of Penrith, Riding B was absorbed into the Municipality of Liverpool, Riding C was absorbed into the Municipality of Camden.
