= Crest Theatre, Granville =

Crest Theatre
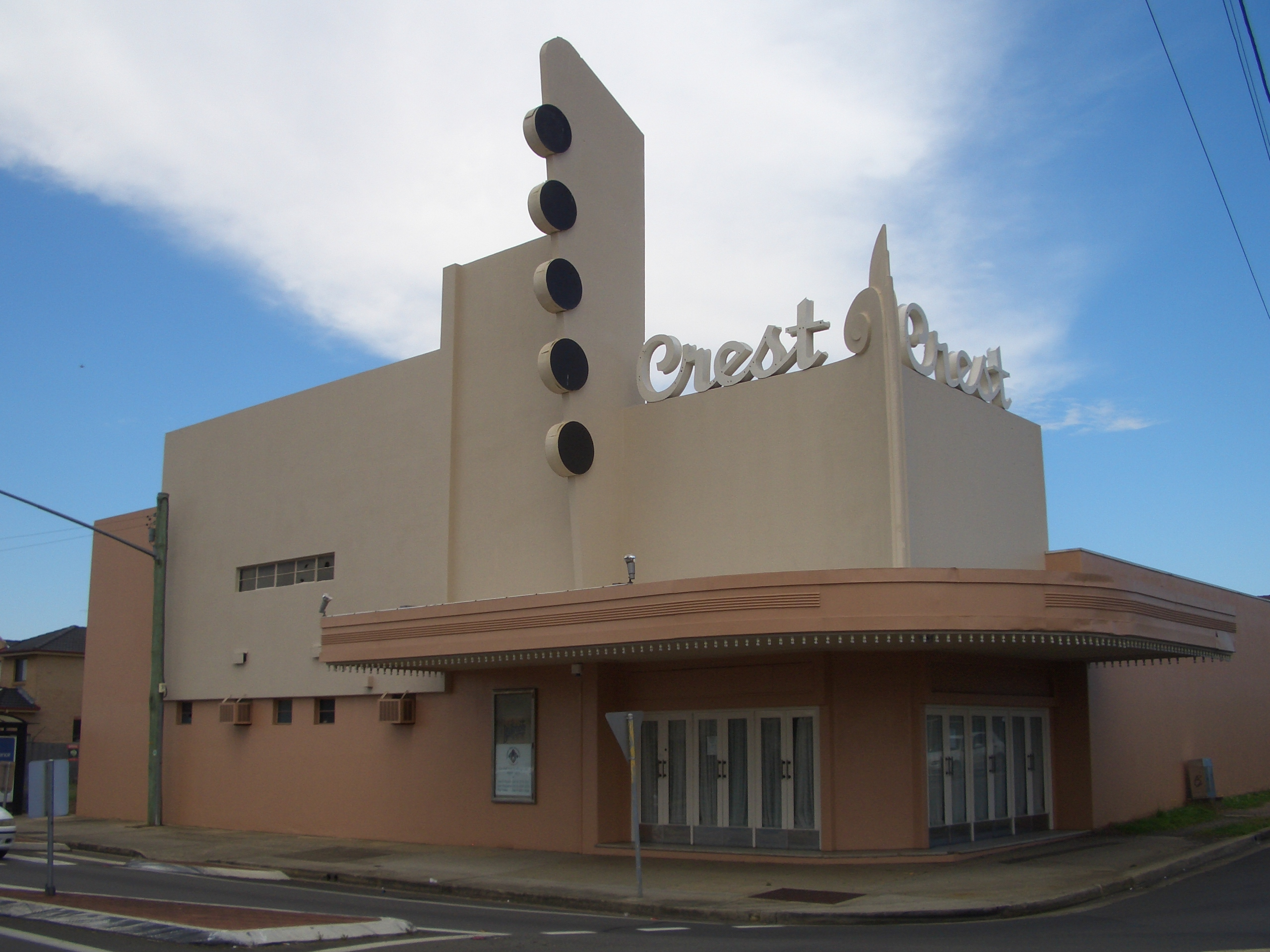
- The Crest while vacant in 2007, prior to its current ownership

- Location within New South Wales Location within Australia
- 33.8458°S 151.0100°E
- Location: 157 Blaxcell Street, Granville, City of Parramatta, New South Wales, Australia

History
- Built: 1948–1948

Site notes
- Architect(s): Cowper; Murphy and Associates
- Owner: The Australian Blouza Association Inc.

New South Wales Heritage Register
- Official name: Crest Theatre; Hoyts Crest Theatre
- Type: state heritage (built)
- Designated: 1 August 2003
- Reference no.: 1664
- Type: Cinema
- Category: Recreation and Entertainment
- Builders: A. W. Edwards Pty Ltd

Crest Theatre is a heritage-listed former cinema and ballroom and now community centre at 157 Blaxcell Street, Granville, New South Wales, a suburb of Sydney Australia. It was designed by Cowper and Murphy and Associates and built in 1948 by A. W. Edwards Pty Ltd. It is also known as Hoyts Crest Theatre. Following its purchase by the Australian Blouza Association, it has been referred to as Blouza Hall. It was added to the New South Wales State Heritage Register on 1 August 2003.

== History ==
Cinema was first established in the suburb of Granville at the Granville Picture Palace which opened on Saturday 3 September 1910 on land adjacent to the old Post Office in Railway Parade.

In 1911 Alfred James Beszant organized screenings of films at Granville Town Hall on Tuesday and Thursday evenings. In 1919 Beszant became the sub-lessee of the Picture Palace.

The Castle Theatre in South Street was erected in 1911 in a paddock in South Street and was capable of seating 800 people. The Castle had lofty castellated towers, search light, arc lights, small coloured electric lights and a screen larger than the Sydney Glaciarium. The electric lighting was powered by a dynamo driven by a steam engine in the nearby woolen mills.

In 1923 Granville Cinema Ltd was formed with the principal shareholder Alfred James Beszant of the Avenue, Granville. This company took over the operations of both the Castle and Picture Palace. This company built the Granville Cinema on the corner of Parramatta Road and Good Street, which opened on 28 April 1924 which has since been demolished.

The Granville South Crest cinema was built by Hoyts' Western Suburbs Cinemas Ltd on land leased at the corner of Blaxcell and Redfern Streets from its owners, the Roman Catholic Church. It was the second of two Quonset cinemas built in Granville by Western Suburbs Cinemas, the first being the Granville Hoyts Castle in South Street which opened on 26 December 1947 and was built on the site of the original 1911 Castle Theatre (this theatre still survives but has been heavily modified and is now used as a public space).

The Crest opened on Easter Saturday, 27 March 1948 with "The Swordsman" and "Dangerous Years." Both theatres were designed by Cowper, Murphy and Associates and built by A. W. Edwards Pty Ltd.

The Crest seated 852 and was similar in construction to the Castle.

Mr L. Nobby Clark was the Crest's first manager and he stayed until 1956. In 1963 he was recalled to close the theatre.

A Hammond electric organ was installed in front of the stage and, for a time in its early years, Miss Ruby Coulson (well known in the Auburn area) played at picture screenings.

In the early 1960s the Crest operated only on Saturdays before screening its final programme on Saturday 24 August 1963. The theatre then reverted to its previous owner, the Roman Catholic Church. At this time the raked floor was rebuilt as a flat floor and the theatre was converted into a ballroom and used for a variety of social functions, particularly as a Bingo centre. The original projection equipment was removed when Hoyts vacated the building.

In the early 1990s the exterior was repainted and the asbestos roofing was replaced with new Colorbond roofing. The interior ceiling was repaired and the lavatories were modernised.

In the mid 1990s the five circle "Hoyts" lettering on the facade's vertical concrete triangular plane was replaced with five letters making up the word "Bingo". Otherwise the interior and exterior are mostly intact.

In more recent years the Crest has been the venue for the annual Cointreau Ball, the Annual General Meeting of the Australian Cinema & Theatre Society and was featured in Anthony Buckley's television series of Poor Man's Orange (adapted from the novel by Ruth Park). In late 2001 Bingo ceased and the cinema was then presently vacant except for occasional functions.

It was later purchased by the Australian Blouza Association, an organisation of Australian descendants from the Lebanese village of Blaouza. The organisation operates the building as a community and function centre, with the hall available for public hire. They refer to the building as Blouza Hall.

== Description ==
The Crest is of Quonset design with one level, vaulted ceiling auditorium, using steel frame construction and with a vestibule/amenity block running parallel to the theatre on the Redfern Street side of the block.

The exterior walls are of concrete with stucco finish. The corner entrance to the cinema has two facades at ninety degrees, which are lower than the main Blaxcell Street stepped facade. The junction of the corner facades is accented with a tapered vertical pier with an art deco motive above the facade below the tip of the pier. On either side of the pier is the name "Crest" in script style large neon lettering. Between the lower and taller Blaxcell Street facades is a large, prominent, triangular concrete pier with five protruding circles which originally contained the letters - H - O -Y - T - S. was later replaced with the letters B - I - N - G - O, and more recently replaced again with the letters B - L - O - U - Z - A.

The corner facades have a curved, cantilevered awning, which featured the word "Crest" at the corner in the same lettering style as the neon signs. A row of small light bulbs outlined the bottom edge of the awning.

Below the awning at the street frontage a display board is situated on the splayed corner below the tapered pier. A bank of six glass-paned, wooden-panelled doors is sited on either side of the splayed corner with a small maquee sign above each bank of doors. These doors open onto the tiled-floor vestibule with the box-office on the inner wall directly behind the entrance doors. There are two entrances to the main theatre, the first beside the box-office and the second at the midpoint of the theatre. Both entrances have their original deep red velvet curtains. The vestibule is painted in a light colour and around a mirror behind the splayed corner, above the doors, box-office windows and along the walls at the two metre mark is very decorative lighter coloured plasterwork in art-nouveau style. The plasterwork partially overlaps the top of the door entrances. The architrave plasterwork is simpler in style and the ceiling lighting has banks of four circular lights, each in a diamond pattern, edged with decorative plaster applique and separated by pairs of fluorescent tubes.

The original candy bar is sited on a higher level at the rear of the vestibule with two doors on the rear wall giving access to the toilets. The Crest and the Castle at Granville were the first to be permitted to use stainless steel flat back urinal stalls, the use of which the Water Board had not previously approved.

The auditorium floor was sloped to accommodate the stalls seating, and has a stepped platform gallery towards the rear, with the projection box behind this "lounge" section. In recent years the sloped floor was removed and replaced with a flat floor. The curved proscenium splay walls swept up to the curve of the acoustic ceiling, following the line of the roof arch. Shell-like light fittings are arranged one above the other on either side of the stage opening, from ceiling to floor. The front of the stage is edged with polished wooden paneling and at its centre is a protruding alcove in which the Hammond organ was originally installed. On either side of the organ is a curved stairway of six steps narrowing at the stage level. Between each of the steps and the proscenium are curved stage projections forming an edging to the steps.

Exit doorways on the angled proscenium wings have elaborate art nouveau plasterwork particularly around the circular ventilators above the doors. The proscenium wings do not extend to the ceiling and their top edge which curves downwards to the side walls is accented with large plasterwork decoration which projects into the space above each wing. This plasterwork extends along each wall to the rear of the theatre with semicircular decoration above each doorway. There is an exterior door on the opposite side of the theatre to the vestibule and this door opens onto the grassed area beside the cinema.

The main curved acoustic ceiling has an elaborate plaster pseudo latticework decoration reminiscent of the theatre ceilings of the early 1920s. On the lower curve above the walls this breaks into bands of different styles of plasterwork in vertical panels with the higher panels in a pink colour. Plasterwork extends over and incorporates air vents on the sidewalls.

The cinema's original pelmet drapes in deep crimson and outlined in gold brocade are still in position. The proscenium arch is highly decorated in large art nouveau style plasterwork.

The main theatre auditorium lighting is provided by two rows of five chandeliers along each edge of the main curved ceiling.

At the rear of the auditorium along each side wall is a thirteen step stairway to the upper gallery, edged in polished timber and with the original "Hoyts" carpet still in position.

The cinema's architectural style and period is post-Art Deco, post-Moderne eclecticism (R. Thorne et al.)

The Crest is currently in excellent condition with the majority of its interior and exterior decoration intact from the late 1940s. The only modification of note was the removal of the raked flooring in the auditorium and minor exterior signage changes. In the early 1990s the exterior was repainted, new Colorbond roofing was installed and the lavatories were modernised.

The theatre was used for Bingo until late 2001 and is currently used for functions on an occasional basis.

=== Condition ===
As at 13 March 2007, the building is in excellent condition with the majority of its internal and external decoration intact from the late 1940s. The only modifications of note have been the removal of the raked flooring in the auditorium and minor exterior signage changes.

This building and its interior and exterior decoration is almost totally intact.

== Heritage listing ==
The former Hoyts Crest Theatre, corner of Blaxcell and Redfern Streets, Granville South, designed by Cowper, Murphy and Associates and built by A. W. Edwards Pty Ltd is of State significance. The cinema is one of the very few cinemas built in the late 1940s.

The interior of the Crest Theatre reflects the cinema designs of the late 1930s continued into the post- World War II period in a simplified manner and, as such, is rare in New South Wales.

The interior features intact decorative plasterwork, light fittings, drapery, candy bar and entry foyer, all largely intact. They have high aesthetic significance and their style is unique among the cinemas of New South Wales.

The theatre's distinctive facades, original signage and corner location make it a prominent landmark in the locality.

This building has social significance, as a local cinema from 1948 until 1963 and since then has been adapted for use as a public hall for social and entertainment purposes.

Crest Theatre was listed on the New South Wales State Heritage Register on 1 August 2003 having satisfied the following criteria.

The place is important in demonstrating the course, or pattern, of cultural or natural history in New South Wales.

The Crest Theatre in South Granville is of state significance in being only one of two Quonset cinemas built in New South Wales and the only one which survives intact. It is also one of few cinemas built in the 1940s and incorporates the pre-fabricated Quonset structural system creatively adapted to civilian use.

The cinema is therefore a rare, surviving intact example of a wartime cinema and is highly significant in demonstrating the history of cinema in New South Wales.

The place has a strong or special association with a person, or group of persons, of importance of cultural or natural history of New South Wales's history.

The Crest Theatre has local significance in relation to the following people of note in the Granville area:

- Miss Ruby Coulson who played the electric organ in the early years of the cinema
- Mr L (Nobby) Clark, who was the cinema's first manager (1948-1956).

The place is important in demonstrating aesthetic characteristics and/or a high degree of creative or technical achievement in New South Wales.

The Crest Theatre is of state significance as a rare example of interior cinema design from the 1940s and post-World War Two.

The interior is aesthetically distinctive and features original decorative plasterwork, light fittings, drapery, and original candy bar. According to the Movie Theatre Heritage Register for NSW prepared by Professor Ross Thorne in 1996, the interior of the Crest Theatre is almost totally intact and its original features and decorative plasterwork are unique in New South Wales.The cinema was rated as Category 1 building for its originality and intactness.

The cinema is also a prominent local landmark.

The place has strong or special association with a particular community or cultural group in New South Wales for social, cultural or spiritual reasons.

The Crest Theatre is of local social significance as a cinema from 1948 until 1963 and as a venue for local entertainment following adaptation for use as a public hall for social and entertaining purposes.

The place has potential to yield information that will contribute to an understanding of the cultural or natural history of New South Wales.

The Crest Theatre is unlikely to display archaeological potential relating to former uses. It does display research potential in relation to surviving prefabricated wartime structures (i.e. Nissen and Quonset huts), their re-use for civilian purposes, and in relation to cinema design and decoration.

The place possesses uncommon, rare or endangered aspects of the cultural or natural history of New South Wales.

The Crest Theatre is of state significance for being one of two surviving Quonset style cinemas in New South Wales. Its intact interior decorative scheme is unique in New South Wales.

The place is important in demonstrating the principal characteristics of a class of cultural or natural places/environments in New South Wales.

The Crest Theatre is a representative example of a suburban theatre, many of which were built in the post-war period. It is a good example of an ex-military Quonset hut creatively adapted to civilian use.
