= Granville, New South Wales =

Suburb of Sydney, Australia

Granville
- Suburb
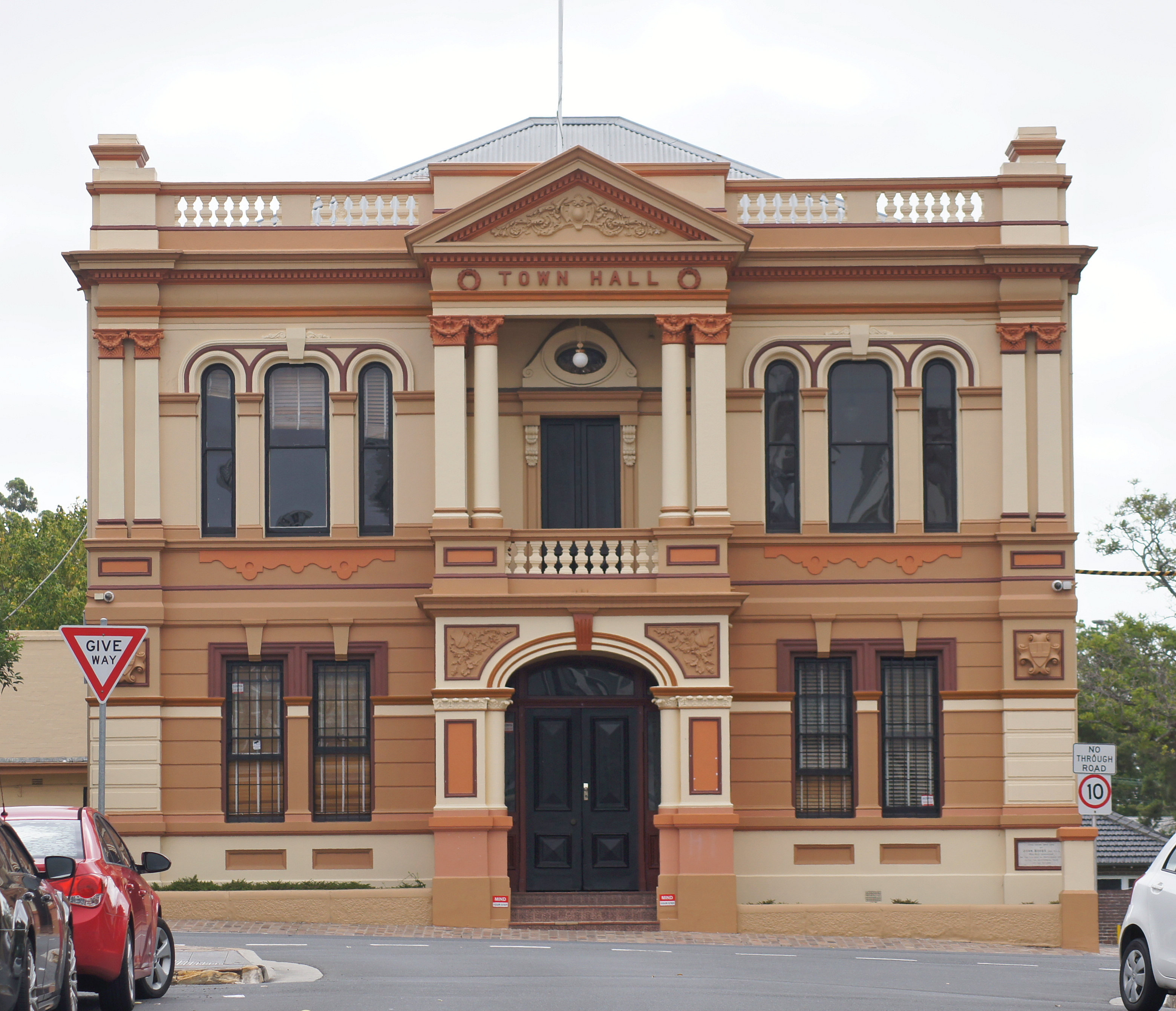
- Granville Town Hall (2024)

- Interactive map of Granville
- Coordinates: 33°50′25″S 151°00′28″E
- Country: Australia
- State: New South Wales
- City: Sydney
- LGAs: Cumberland City Council; City of Parramatta
- Location: 18 km (11 mi) W of Sydney CBD
- Established: 1855

Government
  - State electorate: Granville
  - Federal divisions: Blaxland; Parramatta

Area
  - Total: 3.3 km^{2} (1.3 sq mi)
- Elevation: 17 m (56 ft)

Population
  - Total: 16,716 (SAL 2021)
- Postcode: 2142
Suburbs around Granville
Harris Park	Rosehill	Silverwater
Merrylands Parramatta	Granville	Clyde
Guildford	South Granville	Auburn

Granville is a suburb in Western Sydney, in the state of New South Wales, Australia. Granville is located 18 kilometres (11 mi) west of the Sydney central business district, split between the local government areas of Cumberland City Council and the City of Parramatta.

South Granville is a separate suburb. Lisgar, Redfern, Heath and Mona Streets form the approximate border between Granville and South Granville. The Duck River provides a boundary with Auburn, to the east.

== History ==
In 1855, the Granville area was known as Parramatta Junction, named after the final stop of the first railway line of New South Wales. The Sydney-Parramatta Line ran from Sydney terminus, just south from today's Central railway station to the Granville area which was originally known as 'Parramatta Junction'. This led to the development of this area, which attracted speculators and some local industries.

In the early days of European colonisation, timber was harvested to fuel the steam engines in Sydney and Parramatta. By the 1860s, the supply of timber was exhausted. The remainder was used by scavengers who made a living by collecting firewood. Wattle bark found use with tanners and the bark from stringybark trees was used for roofing of huts. In 1862, a major estate, Drainville, became subject to a mortgagee sale and subdivided for villa homes, and small agricultures. At the end of the decade a Tweed Mill was established, which was steam powered using water from the Duck River. In 1878, the locality received its own post office, which was then part of the stationmasters house.

The name 'Parramatta Junction' remained until 1880, when two public meetings voted that the name be changed. Several names were suggested including Drainwell, Vauxhall, Nobbsville, and Swagsville, but finally the name of Granville in honour of the British Foreign Secretary, the Granville Leveson-Gower, 2nd Earl Granville. Even then the voice of protest was raised declaring the name was "too French", but the dissenter was ignored.

At this time, the place had a population of 372, of which 176 were male and 196 female. In this era some German settlers, Joseph Klein and P W Merkell, tried to establish vineyards in the area, but eventually found the land was not suited for this type of agriculture. More farmers discovered the limitations of the local soils and fruit growers complained about the damage from flying foxes. Thus, the only practical use for the grasslands, which replaced the original bushland, was for dairy cattle.

The Granville Municipality was formed in 1885 and the council carried on the local government of the area until 1948, when it became part of an enlarged City of Parramatta.

On Anzac Day of 1974, Granville was partially severed by flooding of the Duck Creek stormwater channel due to torrential rain that fell over the area. 135 millimetres of rain fell between 11.30 pm and 12.30 pm at Guildford, with the ensuing flood doing major damage through Granville. The nearby RSL was damaged and many of the club's old photographs and honour boards were destroyed.

Granville is also the location of the Granville railway disaster, which occurred on 18 January 1977 when a commuter train derailed just before the Bold Street overpass and hit the stanchion, causing the bridge to collapse. 83 people perished, making it the worst rail disaster in Australian history.

== Heritage listings ==
Granville has a number of heritage-listed sites, including:

- 10 Carlton Street: Granville Town Hall
- 157 Blaxcell Street: Crest Theatre

== Buildings and places of interest ==
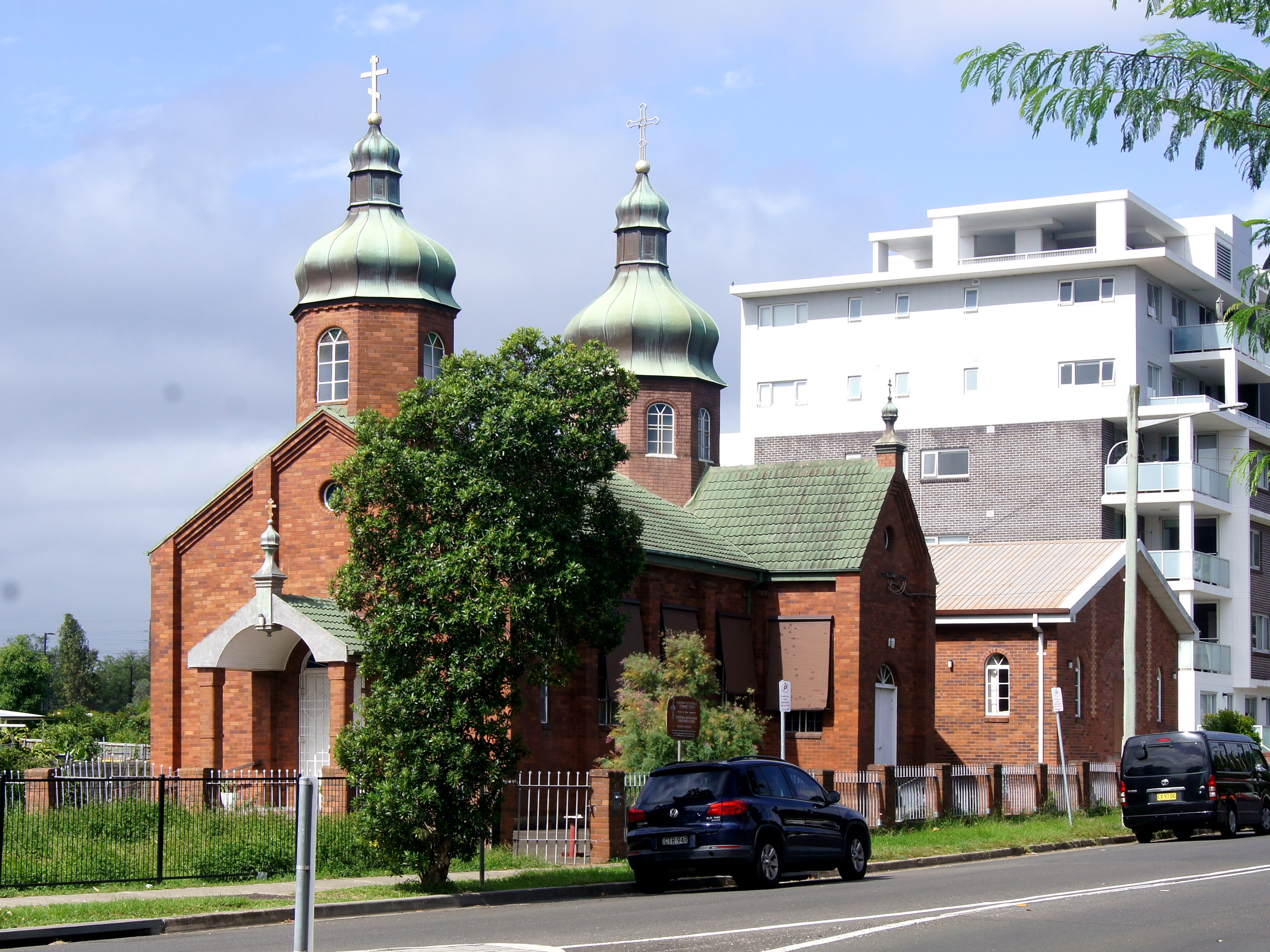
St. Aphanasius Ukrainian Autocephalic Orthodox church

Granville has a mixture of residential, commercial and industrial developments. The commercial and residential developments are mostly around Granville railway station and Parramatta Road. Granville is primarily dominated by freestanding weatherboard, fibro and unrendered brick buildings. The area is no longer exactly "typical" quarter acre block territory, but 500 to 600 m^{2} (0.12 to 0.15 acres) blocks are reasonably common. Terraced houses are rare, but increasing in number. Apartment blocks, generally three to four storeys in height, are also becoming more common in the vicinity of the railway station.

Buildings that deserve some attention are:

- Granville Town Hall, which was built in 1888
- The Royal Hotel corresponds with the architecture of the Town Hall about 200 m away
- The Former School of Arts building just north of the railway station on Good Street, built in 1883
- St. Marks Anglican Church dates back to 1882
- St. Aphanasius Church, a Ukrainian Autocephalic Orthodox with onion domes, adds some interest to William Street. It dates back to 1956.
- The White Palace in South Street has an exterior with Art Deco features. The building was gutted and redeveloped in 2007.
- The intersecting circles of Granville RSL Sub-Branch Building serves as an interesting example of modern architecture. It was designed by Frank Fox & Associates.

=== Crest Theatre ===
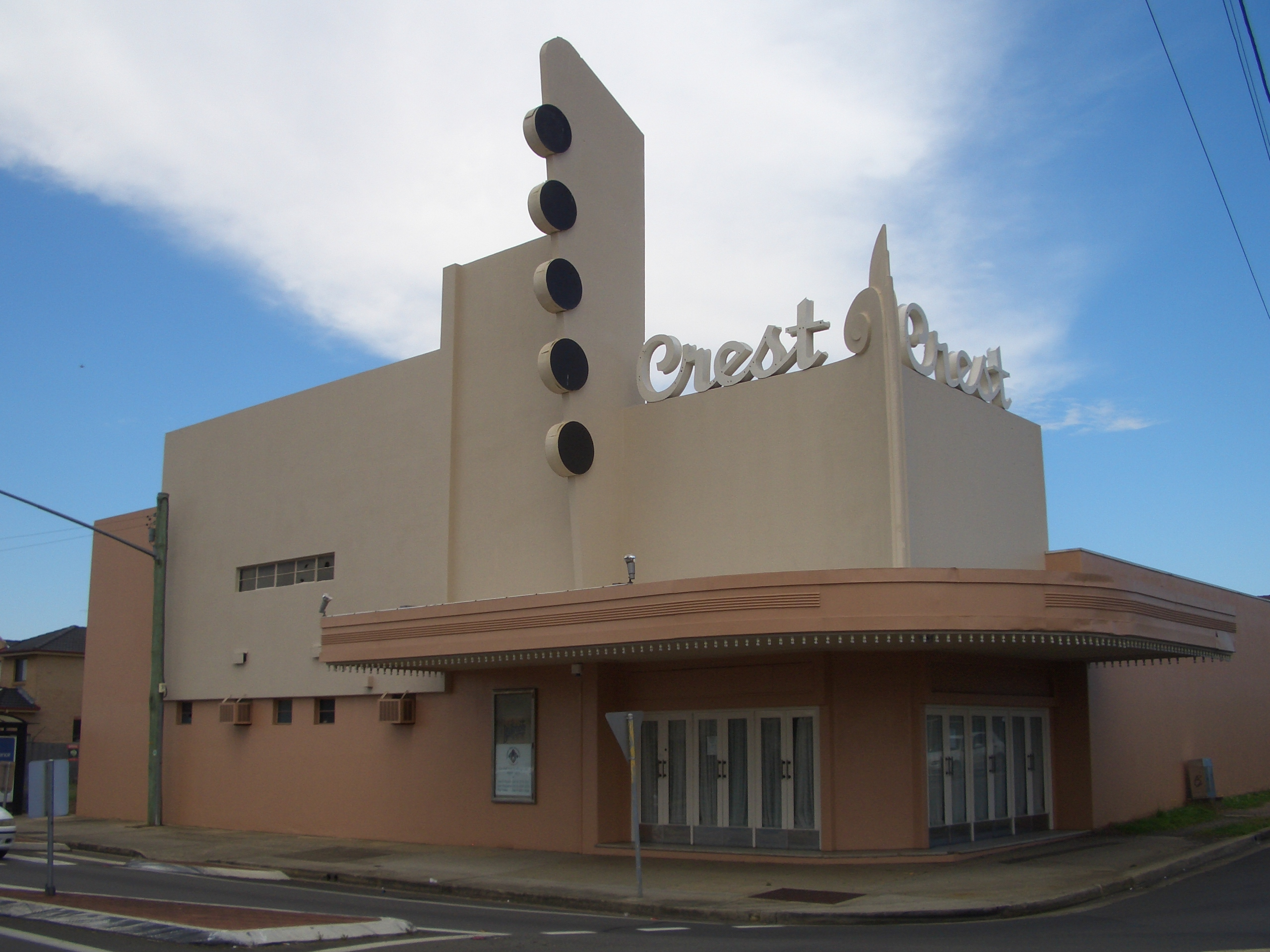
The "Crest" Theatre, originally a movie theatre.

The Crest building on the corner of Blaxcell and Redfern Streets, was built by Hoyts in 1948 as a movie theatre and was used for screening films up until 1963. The structure of the building is of a Quonset hut design, while the facade and interior is of a post-Art Deco and post-Moderne eclectic style, influenced by the "Picture Palace" architecture popularly used for movie theatres. It is now used as a function hall.

The Crest Theatre is now listed in the NSW State Heritage Register as being of "State significance", being one of the few cinemas built in Australia in the 1940s. Externally and internally the building remains largely intact, though the signage on the external decorative pier now reads "B-L-O-U-Z-A", rather than the original "H-O-Y-T-S" (later it was "B-I-N-G-O").

== Transport ==
=== Trains ===
Granville railway station has traditionally been a major station on the Main Western railway line, though many services have now been removed due to prioritisation of Mountains trains over the needs of local residents. It is served by T1 Northern & Western Lines and T2 Leppington & Inner West Line Sydney Trains services. Granville's bus interchange, as well as a car park, are located adjacent to its train station.

=== Bus ===
Granville is serviced by Transdev NSW and features a newly built bus interchange. Transdev NSW operates three bus routes via Granville railway station:

- 906: Parramatta station to Fairfield station
- M91: Parramatta station to Hurstville
- S2: to Sefton

Granville station is served by one NightRide (Night Bus) route:

- N60: Fairfield station to Town Hall station

=== Road ===
Parramatta Road has always been an important thoroughfare for Sydney from its earliest days, when it was known as "Dog Trap Road," due to the outside of using small wheeled buggies - similar sleds - pulled by dogs at that time. From Parramatta the major western road for the state is the Great Western Highway. The M4 Western Motorway, running parallel to the Great Western Highway has taken much of the traffic away from these roads, with entrance and exit ramps close to Parramatta.

== Education ==
Granville has a major college of Technical and Further Education, which is part of the South Western Sydney Institute of TAFE. Schools include Granville Boys High School which was founded in 1926, Delany College, Granville Public School, Granville East Public School, Blaxcell Street Public School and Holy Family Catholic School. The suburb is also home to a Cumberland Council branch library.

== Culture ==
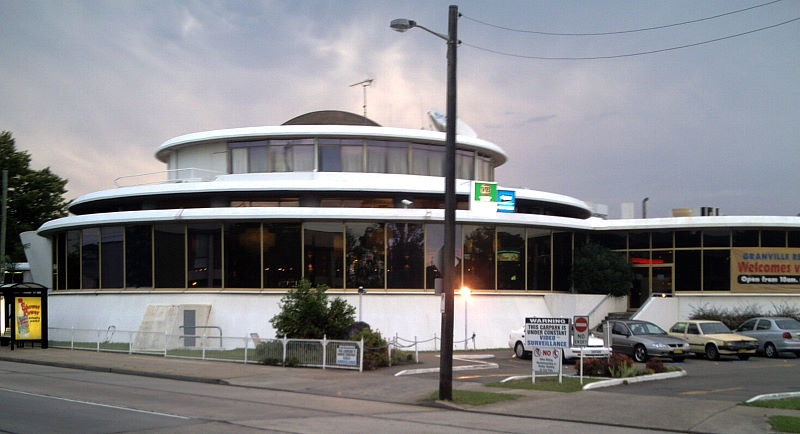
The Granville RSL Club at sunset

=== Sport ===
Granville has an Olympic size pool and a football facility. Historic Garside Park is home to State Super League and Super Youth League club, Granville Rage.

Sydney Speedway was a 460 metres (500 yards) dirt track speedway which opened in 1977 at the old Granville Showground as the Parramatta Speedway. The clay surface catered mainly to Sprintcars and was home to some of Australia's greatest drivers including ten times Australian Sprintcar Champion Garry Rush, and multiple title holders George Tatnell, his son Brooke Tatnell, and Max Dumesny. The speedway was also the only venue not in North or Central America to host a round of the famous World of Outlaws sprintcar series. It was shut down in 2021 and replaced with a new track in Eastern Creek.

Granville Magpies Soccer Club entered the Sydney competition in the early 1880s and has continued to compete with distinction until the early 2000s. The club originally played matches at a paddock behind Hudson Brothers' Works in Clyde before relocating to Macarthur Park, known nowadays as F.S. Garside Park.

== Demographics ==
=== 2011 Census ===
At the 2011 census, there were 13,989 residents in Granville. More than half of people were born outside of Australia, with the top countries of birth being India, China and Lebanon. Three-quarters of people spoke a language other than English at home. The most common other languages spoken at home were Arabic 18.1%, Cantonese 5.5%, Mandarin 4.8%, Turkish 2.3% and Tongan 2.0%. The housing in Granville was evenly spread between detached houses and higher density units or apartments. 46.3% of residents were renting their home and this was higher than the national average of 29.6%.

=== 2016 Census ===
Data from the 2016 census shows that the population of Granville was 15,332. Of this population:

- 52.6% are male, with 47.4% being female.
- 66.3% of people were born outside Australia, with the top countries of birth being India (10.4%), China (7.6%), Nepal (5.9%), Lebanon (5.1%) and the Philippines (3.4%).
- 21.9% of people spoke only English at home. Other languages spoken at home included Arabic 14.9%, Nepali 6.6%, Mandarin 6.1%, Cantonese 5.1% and Hindi 3.9%.
- For religious affiliation, the top responses were Catholic (21.1%), Islam (19.7%), Hinduism (15.6) and No Religion (14.1%).

=== 2021 Census ===
Data from the 2021 census shows that the population of Granville was 16,716. Of this population:

- 53.4% are male, with 46.6% being female.
- 68.7% of people were born outside Australia, with the top countries of birth being Nepal (13.4%), India (9.0%), China (7.5%), Lebanon (4.5%) and the Philippines (3.4%).
- 21.7% of people spoke only English at home. Other languages spoken at home included Nepali (13.3%), Arabic (12.1%), Mandarin (6.9%), Cantonese (4.3%) and Hindi (2.8%).
- For religious affiliation, the top responses were Hinduism (19.8%), Catholic (18.5%), Islam (18.3%), No Religion (15.7%) and Not stated (9.1%).

== Notable residents ==
- John Devitt (1937–2023), Olympic gold medallist and manager of the Australian Commonwealth Games team grew up in Granville
- Jack Ferguson (1924–2002), Former deputy premier of New South Wales
- Mark Geyer (born 1967), rugby league player, born in Granville
- Paul Hogan (born 1940), actor, grew up in Granville
- Hillal Kara-Ali (born 1990), winner of the sixth season of the Australian version of The Mole
- Bernie McGann (1937–2013), Saxophonist who was born in Granville
- Judy Stone (born 1942), Australian pop singer, was born and raised in Granville
- Roland Stuart Andrews (1897–1961), Industrial Chemist and Administrator

== See also ==
- Electoral district of Granville
- Municipality of Granville
- South Granville, New South Wales
- Granville railway station
- Granville railway disaster
