= Municipality of Dundas =

Former local government area in New South Wales, Australia

- Local government area
- Country: Australia
- State: New South Wales
- Established: 23 March 1889
- Abolished: 31 December 1948
- Council seat: Dundas Municipal Council Chambers

Area
  - Total: 10.92 km^{2} (4.22 sq mi)

Population
  - Total: 7,635 (1947 census)
  - Density: 699.2/km^{2} (1,810.9/sq mi)
- Parish: Field of Mars
LGAs around Municipality of Dundas
Baulkham Hills	Baulkham Hills	Eastwood
Parramatta	Municipality of Dundas	Ryde
Ermington-Rydalmere	Ermington-Rydalmere	Ryde

The Municipality of Dundas was a local government area in the North-western region of Sydney, New South Wales, Australia. Initially proclaimed as the "Borough of Dundas" on 23 March 1889, the southern part of the municipality seceded in June 1891 as the Municipal District of Ermington and Rydalmere. From 1891, the municipality included the modern suburbs of Dundas, Dundas Valley and parts of Ermington, Epping, Eastwood, Melrose Park, Oatlands and Carlingford. From 1 January 1949, the council was amalgamated into the City of Parramatta, with the passing of the Local Government (Areas) Act 1948.

== Council history ==
=== Early years and development ===
The area comprising the Dundas municipality was first incorporated on 23 March 1889, when the "Borough of Dundas" was proclaimed in the lands east of the Town of Parramatta by the Governor of New South Wales, Lord Carrington.

The first council, comprising nine Aldermen elected at-large, was elected on 18 May 1889, conducted by Walter Monckton, Returning Officer. The council first met at Rydalmere Hall, Rydalmere, on 22 May 1889 with James Fulford elected the first mayor. William De Burgh Hocter, former town clerk of The Glebe, was appointed the first Town Clerk in June 1889.

Alderman	Notes
James Fullford	Ermington
Alexander Eyles	Field of Mars
George Spurway	Field of Mars
Joseph Franks	Carlingford
Jeffry Grime	Carlingford
John Ryan	Rydalmere
James Sonter	Field of Mars
William Midson	Carlingford
George Adamson	Ermington

Following a petition, the borough was divided into three wards, North Ward, Central Ward and South Ward, on 30 December 1889.

=== Separation of Ermington-Rydalmere ===
On 13 February 1891, 94 residents of the South Ward submitted a petition to the NSW Government requesting the creation of a separate municipality divided into two wards. This petition was subsequently accepted and the "Municipal District of Ermington and Rydalmere" was proclaimed on 18 June 1891. The separation also required the reconstitution of Dundas, which was proclaimed as (East Ward, West Ward; six aldermen) on the same day.

On the separation, The Cumberland Argus and Fruitgrowers' Advocate, which had opposed the separation, noted: "There will be a good deal of weeping and wailing at Dundas in consequence; but, although we fought tooth and nail against the petitioners, we hope now to see the hatchet buried. Both municipalities must work together for their own good".

The council wards were rearranged into three wards on 6 June 1902, with Central Ward adding three aldermen to the number from February 1903. From 28 December 1906, following the passing of the Local Government Act, 1906, the council was renamed as the "Municipality of Dundas".

=== Later history ===
By the end of the Second World War, the NSW Government had realised that its ideas of infrastructure expansion could not be effected by the present system of the patchwork of small municipal councils across Sydney and the Minister for Local Government, Joseph Cahill, initiated the 1945–46 Clancy Royal Commission on Local Government Boundaries, to consider these changes. The Dundas and Ermington-Rydalmere municipalities recognised this pressure by initiated procedures to amalgamate once more and Ermington-Rydalmere appointed A. T. Kay, Town Clerk of Dundas, as their acting town clerk in anticipation of this.

The NSW Government however passed a bill following the recommendations of the Royal Commission in 1948 that abolished a significant number of Sydney metropolitan councils. Pre-empting the actions of Dundas and Ermington-Rydalmere, under the Local Government (Areas) Act 1948 (effective 1 January 1949), both councils merged with the City of Parramatta to form the a new City of Parramatta.

The Dundas municipality became "Dundas Ward", returning four aldermen. Kay became the new Parramatta Town Clerk, while Eric Arthur Mobbs, mayor of Dundas from 1944, became the first mayor of the expanded City of Parramatta. In 1950 a reorganisation of Parramatta's wards resulted in Ermington-Rydalmere ward being absorbed into the Dundas Ward, adding two aldermen.

== Mayors ==
Years	Mayors	Notes
22 May 1889 – 15 February 1893	James Fulford	
15 February 1893 – 10 February 1897	Frederick Charles Cox	
10 February 1897 – 12 February 1898	Henry Thomas Johnston	
12 February 1898 – February 1904	Frederick Charles Cox	
8 February 1904 – 19 July 1905	Henry Thomas Johnston	
19 July 1905 – 13 February 1907	Frederick Ernest Spurway	
13 February 1907 – 10 February 1911	John Neil	
10 February 1911 – 23 February 1912	Frederick Ernest Spurway	
23 February 1912 – 12 February 1913	John Neil	
12 February 1913 – 10 February 1915	Frederick Ernest Spurway	
10 February 1915 – 9 February 1916	David Auchterlonie	
9 February 1916 – 6 February 1918	John Neil	
6 February 1918 – 5 February 1919	Frederick Ernest Spurway	
5 February 1919 – 4 February 1920	Reginald Taylor	
4 February 1920 – 22 December 1920	Frederick Ernest Spurway	
22 December 1920 – 21 December 1921	Herbert Greenwood	
21 December 1921 – 6 December 1922	John S. Fraser	
6 December 1922 – 19 December 1923	Herbert Greenwood	
19 December 1923 – 3 December 1924	Frederick Ernest Spurway	
3 December 1924 – 22 December 1925	David Auchterlonie	
22 December 1925 – 2 December 1926	Frederick Ernest Spurway	
2 December 1926 – 12 December 1928	George Harley	
12 December 1928 – 11 December 1929	Eric Arthur Mobbs	
11 December 1929 – 10 December 1930	William Thomas Cook	
10 December 1930 – 15 February 1931	David Auchterlonie	
18 February 1931 – 14 December 1932	Hartley Roan Feather	
14 December 1932 – 5 December 1934	George Harley	
5 December 1934 – 2 December 1936	Eric Arthur Mobbs	
2 December 1936 – 13 December 1939	Frederick Ernest Spurway	
13 December 1939 – 11 December 1940	Ellis Rothwell	
11 December 1940 – 6 December 1944	Frederick Robertson	
6 December 1944 – 31 December 1948	Eric Arthur Mobbs	

== Town Clerks ==
Years	Town Clerk	Notes
24 June 1889 – January 1890	William De Burgh Hocter	
January 1890 – 20 March 1907	John Saunders	
2 April 1907 – November 1908	John Ellis Jnr.	
12 November 1908 – 16 November 1931	Thomas Carson	
16 November 1931 – 31 December 1948	A. T. Kay	
