= Granville Town Hall =

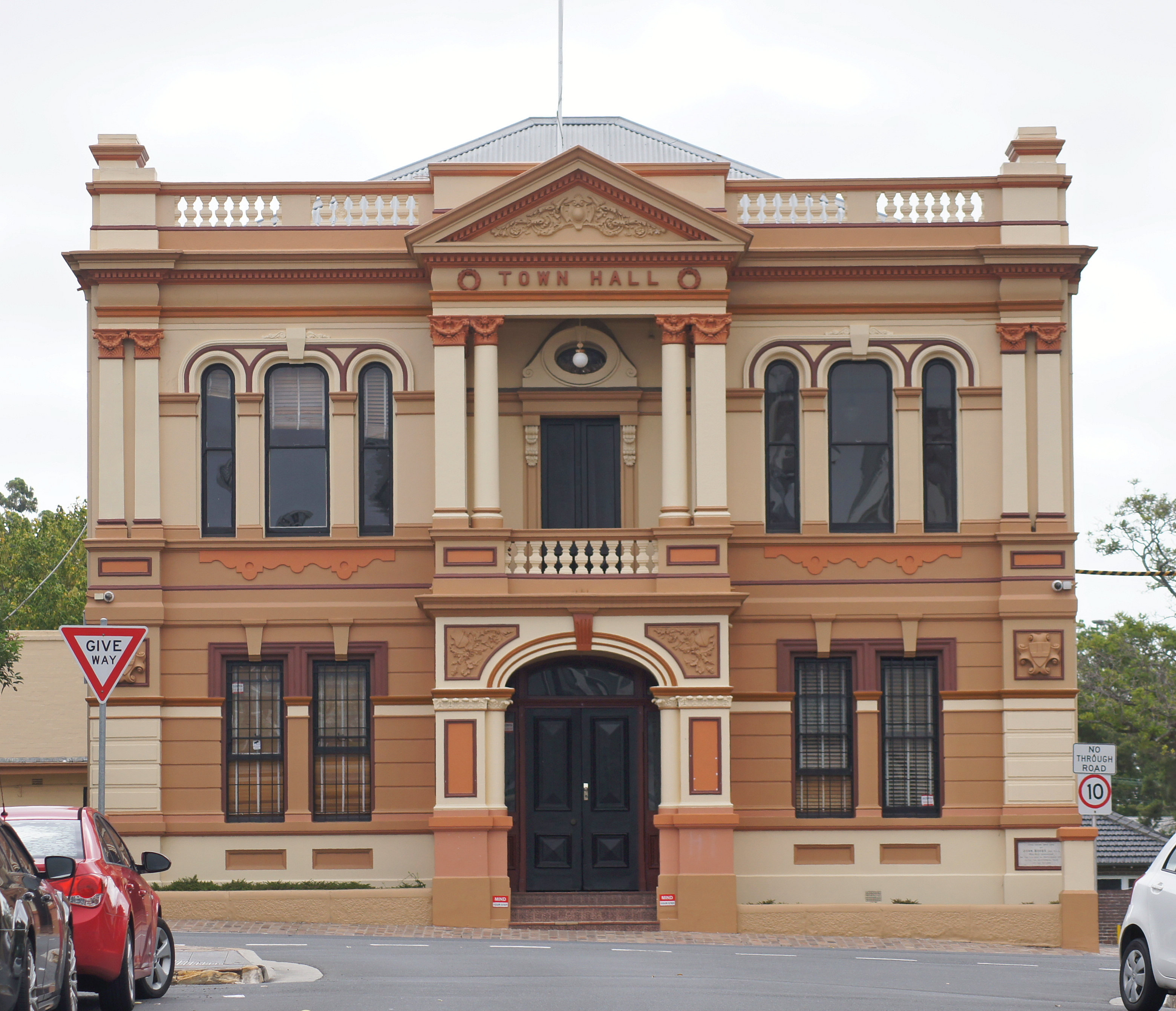

- Location within Sydney Location within Australia
- 33.8329°S 151.0093°E
- Location: 10 Carlton Street, Granville, New South Wales, Australia

History
- Built: 1888

Site notes
- Architect(s): Charles Assinder Harding (council chambers); J. W. Hill (auditorium)
- Owner: Cumberland Council

New South Wales Heritage Register
- Official name: Granville Town Hall
- Type: state heritage (built)
- Designated: 5 December 2003
- Reference no.: 1679
- Type: Hall Town Hall
- Category: Community Facilities
- Builders: Banks and Whitehurst

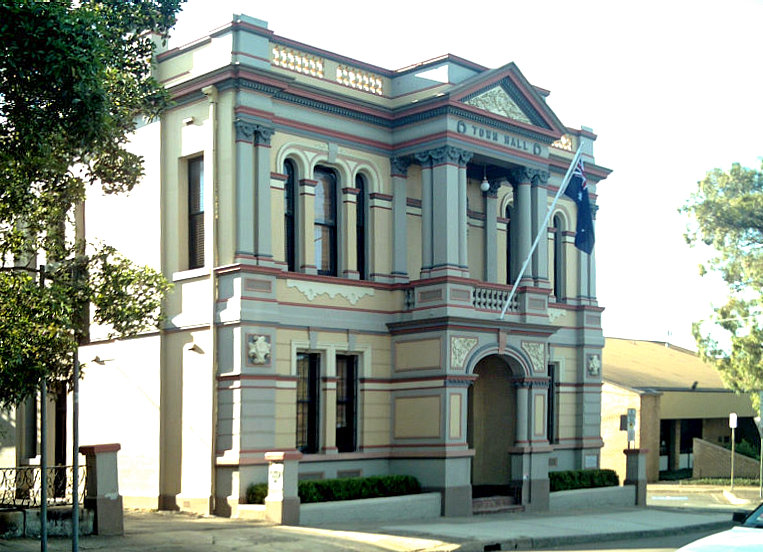
The Town Hall in a previous colour scheme (2007)

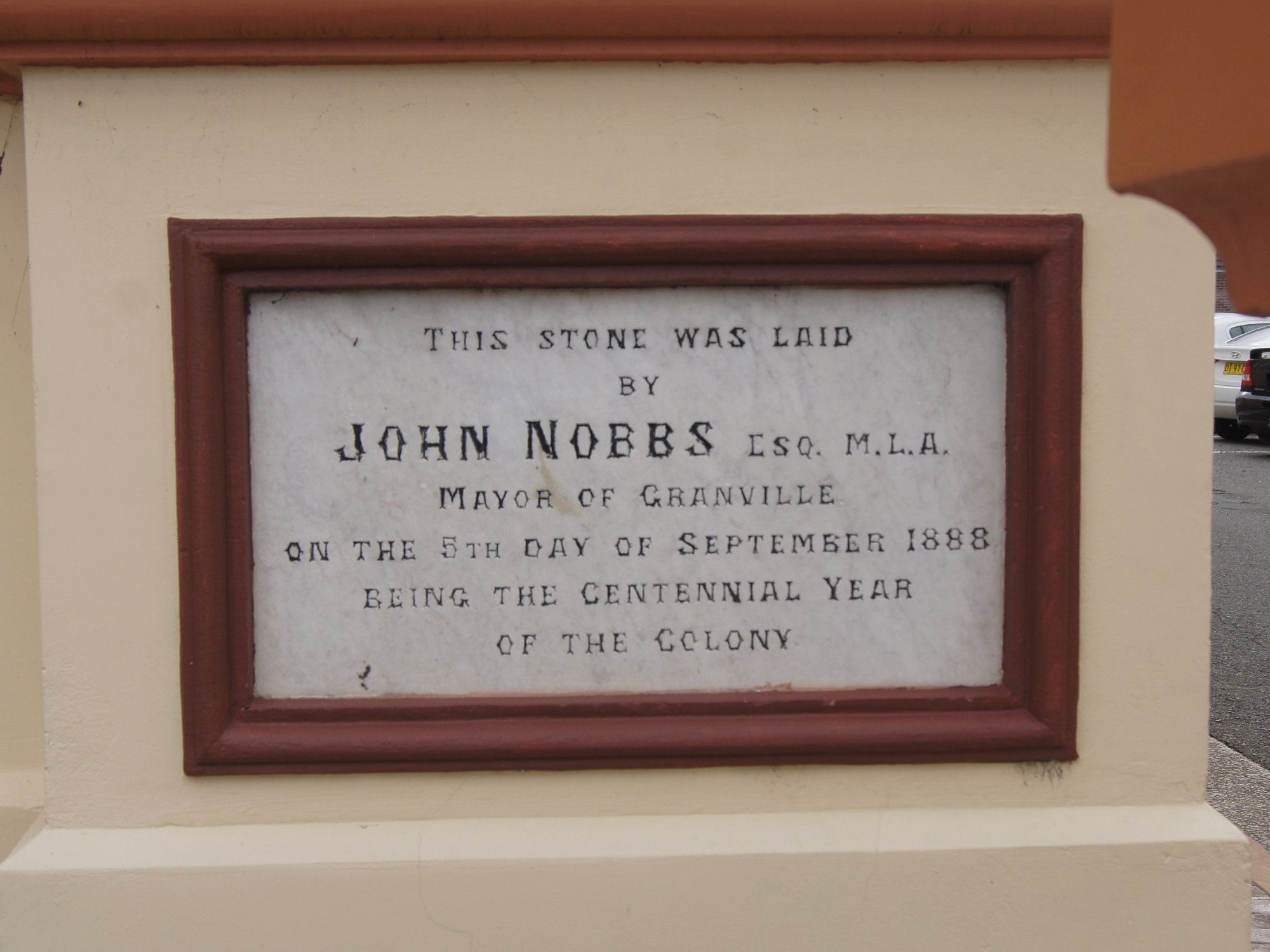
The foundation stone

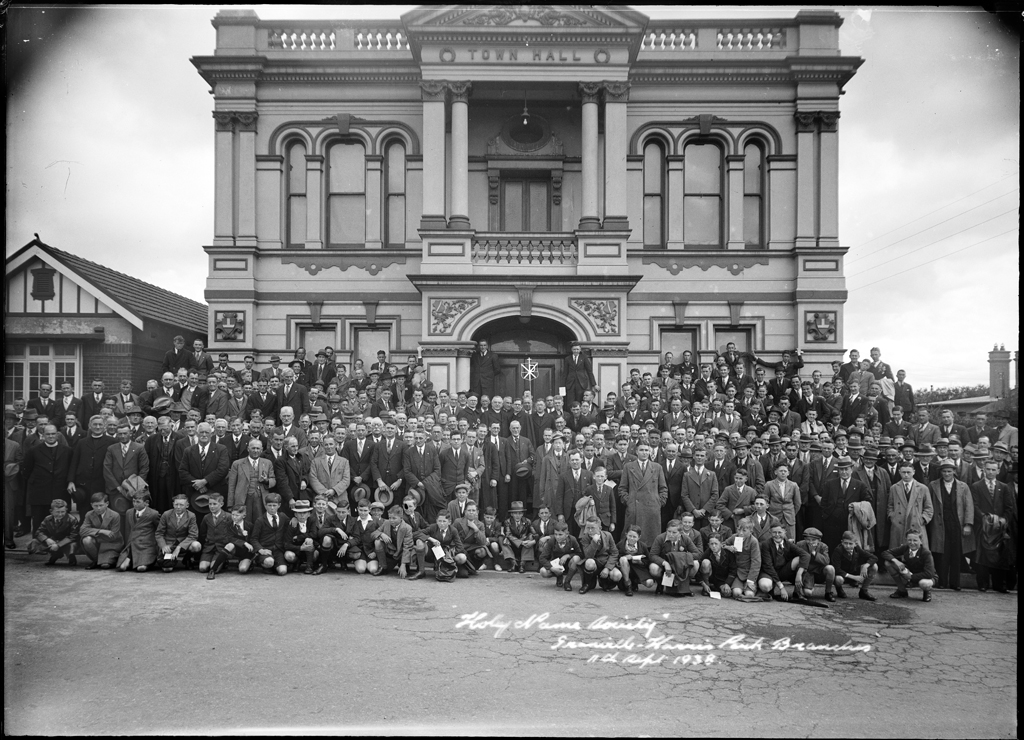
Holy Name Society Granville-Harris Park Branches at the Town Hall (1938)

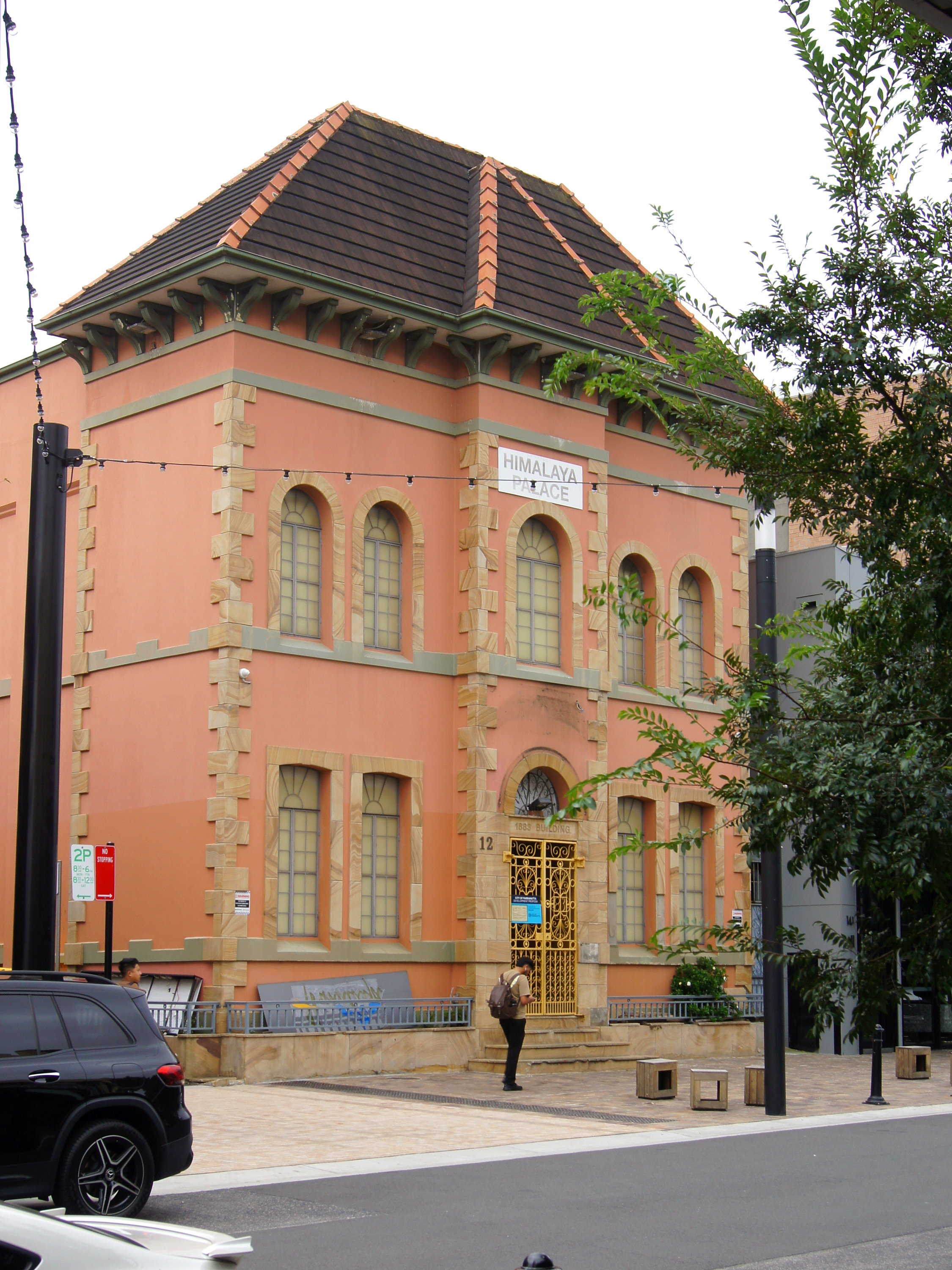
The Former School of Arts served as Town Hall from 1884 to 1889

Granville Town Hall is a heritage-listed former town hall at 10 Carlton Street, Granville, New South Wales, a suburb of Sydney, Australia. It was designed by Charles Harding of Sydney (council chambers) and J. W. Hill (auditorium). The council chambers were built in 1888 by Banks and Whitehurst, with the auditorium added in 1900, to serve as the seat of the Municipality of Granville. The property is now owned by Cumberland Council since 2016, having been owned by the City of Parramatta since 1949. It was added to the New South Wales State Heritage Register on 5 December 2003.

== History ==
The township of Granville developed following the construction of the railway from Sydney in 1855 with timber and then fruit-growing as early industries. By the mid-1870s Granville had become a popular site for the erection of "gentlemen's villas". John Nobbs was a major figure among the early group of gentlemen, tradesmen and workers who settled at Granville. In 1878 the locality received its own post office, which was then part of the station master's house. The township retained the name of Parramatta Junction until 1880 when public meetings voted to change the name to Granville, in honour of the Earl of Granville, a former colonial secretary, in honour of the then British Foreign Minister, Lord Granville. A significant boost to the area came with the establishment in 1881 of the Hudson Brothers engineering works nearby at Clyde. A workforce had to be recruited and housed.

On 12 February 1884, a petition calling for incorporation of the area was published in the Government Gazette, and in January 1885, Granville was officially gazetted and incorporated as a municipality. John Nobbs was elected the first Mayor, and enjoyed a reputation as the "Father of Granville". Council meetings were initially held in the School of Arts building in Good Street, north of the railway line.

In 1888 Granville Council decided to erect its own Town Hall to celebrate the centenary of European settlement in Sydney. Architect Charles A. Harding of Sydney designed the Town Hall, and Banks and Whitehurst were selected to complete the building. The foundation stone was laid by John Nobbs on 5 September 1888.

In his speech at the ceremony, John Nobbs as Mayor referred to the rapid growth of Granville over the decade. From 12 or 13 houses, it had grown to 900 buildings including 760 houses, 60 shops, two banks, three public halls including a School of Arts, seven churches, two public schools and 13 factories, of which, two were the largest in the colony: Hudson Brothers and Brunton's (Flour) Mills.

The official opening of Granville Council Chambers was held on 16 January 1889. The opening ceremony was held in the Council Chamber which was lit by two chandeliers. According to the press report, the Council Chamber was built on "true Australian lines in the matter of ventilation freely afforded by windows all around the room." It was reported that the site had cost 600 pounds, and the building's contract price was 1090 pounds without fittings. Offices for the Council Clerk, Engineer, Overseer, Inspector of Nuisances, and library were on the ground floor. A spacious staircase led to the first floor where the Council Chamber was located, 11m x 9m and Mayor's Room. A balcony, 3m x 1.5m was erected over the porch.

The auditorium (i.e. the main hall) was added in 1900, designed by James Whitmore Hill, a Parramatta-based architect.

The Municipality of Granville was merged into the Parramatta City Council from 1 January 1949 and the regular council meetings of the new Parramatta City were held at the Granville Town Hall from 1948 until 1958, when the new Parramatta administration centre opened.

On 12 May 2016, the Cumberland Council was proclaimed as a new local government area, combining parts of Auburn City Council (south of the M4 Western Motorway), the Woodville Ward of the Parramatta City Council (which contained the Town Hall), and the majority of the Holroyd City Council. The first Special Meeting of Cumberland Council was held on 19 May 2016, at the Granville Town Hall.

== Description ==
The Granville Town Hall is a largely intact example of a Victorian Free Classical local government building.

The original 1888 section is a two-storey, rendered brick building on an almost square plan with a hipped corrugated iron roof. The facade to Carlton Street is designed in the Italianate manner and features a two-storey projecting port and flanking piers with second-storey paired pilasters. Fenestration is bi-partite on the ground floor and tri-partite on the upper floor. The interior consists of offices and the original Council Chamber. Of interest is the timber joinery, especially the elaborate architraves and the timber Honour Boards in the Council Chamber. The auditorium or hall, added in 1900, is a plain painted brick gabled structure running westward behind the front section. Internally the large hall is distinguished by restrained Doric pilasters supporting a panelled vault ceiling. Restoration work undertaken in early 2003 by architect Graham Edds involved removing the modern plaster covering the walls and ceiling of the auditorium, and revealing an unusual ripple iron ceiling, painted pale blue with gold stars, and three large decorative ventilation domes. To the south of the front section of the town hall there is a former council workers office, now used by the Granville Historical Society. This is a Federation brick building, with the stretcher brick bond tuck pointed on the northern and eastern sides. It has a gabled Marseilles tiled roof and exposed beams in the eaves. It has two equal sized rooms. On the west and south-western sides of the hall there is a variety of non-significant skillion roof structures.

The current allotment covers an area of 2739.4 sqm and is located on a gentle sloping site fronting Carlton Street, Granville. Today it is bounded along the northern side by a laneway leading to the library carpark. To the south and west of the property now abuts residential development. A driveway from Carlton Street located south of the Town Hall and between it and the former council workers office provides limited on-site vehicular access and car parking. The site contains the:

- former Council Chambers / Town Hall complex
- former council officer's building, now used by the Granville Historical Society
- galvanised storage shed
- additional toilet.

=== Condition ===
The Granville Town Hall was reported to be well maintained as at 6 June 2003. Urgent repair works involving re-roofing and installation of a dampproof course commenced in early 2000. Since then, Parramatta Council has undertaken conservation works to the former Town Hall Chambers involving conservation of both the interior and repainting of the exterior.

The separate 1922 Council Offices building is in fair condition although access for internal inspection is yet to occur (Form, 2016 (2), 17).

The archaeological potential of the site is considered to be low. This is due to the Town Hall being the first building on the site and occupying the whole site.

Despite the extent of modifications to the building over its life, little original fabric has been removed and conservation works have taken place in accordance with a Conservation Management Plan (2000).

=== Modifications and dates ===
Construction of the Town Hall commenced in 1888. There have been 5 main stages of construction.

Phase 1 (1888–1889)

The original Council Chambers (designed by Charles A Harding) comprised four offices for staff and library on the ground floor, and the Council Chambers and Mayor's Room on the first floor with a balcony located over the entrance porch.

Phase 2 (1900–1921)

In 1900 a main Hall or auditorium (designed by James Whitmore Hill) including a gallery, stage and two "retiring rooms" on one side with lavatory accommodation was constructed. The upstairs gallery was accessed by a new door opening cut into the former external western wall. A timber external fire stair was constructed to provide fire egress from the gallery.

Phase 3 (1922–1927)

A separate building was added to provide offices for the council engineer and health inspector. It is the thought that additional toilets were added during this period. In 1923 the iron palisade railings to the flower beds fronting Carlton Street were removed.

Phase 4 (1928–1929)

This phase involved major additions to the western end of the main auditorium with the relocation of the stage and the two dressing rooms. The auditorium ceiling was underclad with decorative fibrous plaster replicating the panelled vaulted form of the original ceiling. This ceiling with a latticed plaster grill obscured from view the original domed ventilators. The 1928 works also included the infilling of the area beneath the gallery to extend the hall and create new toilets and a strong room. The earlier toilets were converted to a kitchen.

Phase 5 (1930–2000)

This phase did not involve major additions, only minor alterations. The dance floor and some floor joists to the auditorium were replaced in 1934. In 1938 the flooring of the Council Chambers was upgraded.

1948: With the amalgamation of Granville within the Parramatta City area, the Town Hall became a community hall and a place for lease, although some Council staff were still located in the offices. It is probable that at this time that two ground-floor rooms were amalgamated into one large roon to provide additional library space. The conversion probably involved the removal of two walls, renewal of the flooring and the ceiling and the insertion of a large steel-framed window and narrow door and two windows. Internally these changes are supported with the walls revealing that the original fireplace and window openings have been bricked up and evidence of foundation walling beneath the floor.

Further works prior to 2000 included: Suspended ceilings were installed in three ground-floor rooms and a plasterboard ceiling in another. The walls of some ground-floor rooms were offset clad with timber lining, presumably to cover damage from rising damp as well as provide another decoration phase although considered unsympathetic.

- The walls above the dado line in the main auditorium were clad with plasterboard and the original ventilator shafts were "vandalised" during electrical works.
- A room was converted for use as a bar, and the room presently used as a kitchenette and the small downstairs meeting room, are thought to be later alterations.
- The kitchen has been recently upgraded to meet current health standards with stainless steel benches and tiled splashback and floors.
- Electrical services have been upgraded and modern facilities, phone, computers etc. have been installed to some areas. A smoke detector system and security system has been installed.
- The galvanised steel shed and the detached WC located in the north-western corner of the site and the commercial grease arrester are intrusive elements and their removal at a future date should be considered.

In 2000 a Conservation Management Plan was prepared and has guided subsequent conservation works:

- The removal of the unsympathetic suspended ceilings, wall panelling within the original Council Chambers and the restoration and reinstallment of finishes and joinery and fireplace details.
- Repairs to the external parapet and wall claddings and membrane painting of the former Council Chambers.

In early 2000 urgent repair works including re-roofing and installing damp-proof course commenced. Since 2000, conservation works on the Council Chambers involving both interior and exterior painting (Form, 2016 (2), 15).

== Heritage listing ==
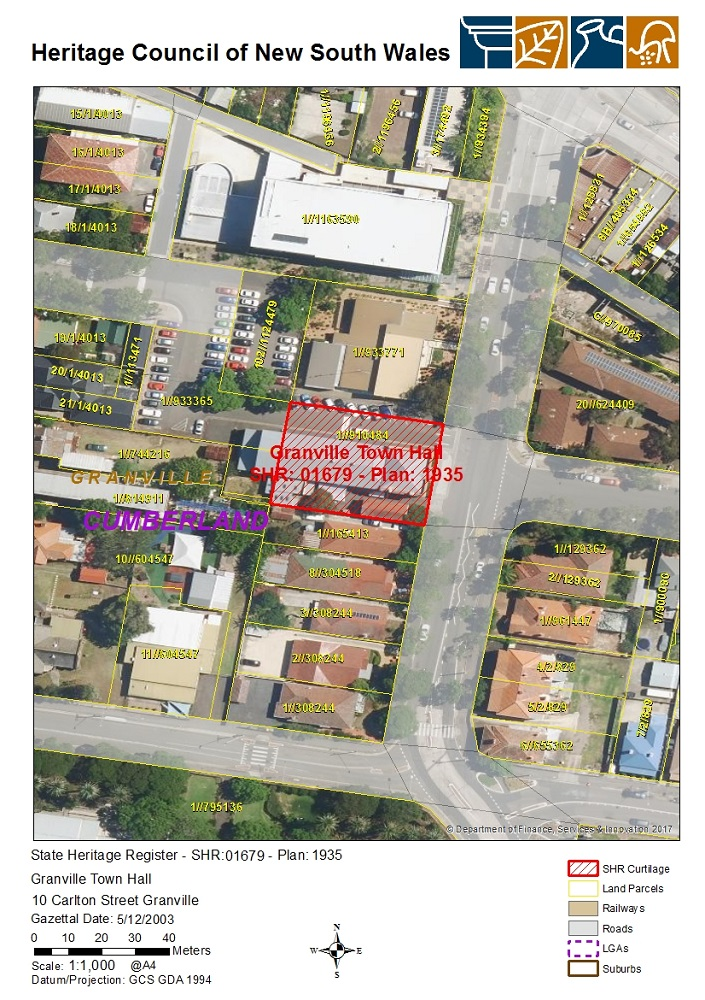
Heritage boundaries

The Granville Town Hall is of state significance as a rare and intact example of a Victorian Free Classical government building. It is thought to be one of only two intact nineteenth-century council chamber buildings extant in Sydney's west. It demonstrates aspects of the history of Granville and the Parramatta locality in the late nineteenth century. Built in 1888 following the incorporation of Granville in 1885, it is an important symbol of the growth of Granville and its sense of identity. Although the seat of local government has since moved to Parramatta, the building is a well-known local landmark and continues to be used as a major venue for community events and activities.

Granville Town Hall was listed on the New South Wales State Heritage Register on 5 December 2003 having satisfied the following criteria.

The place is important in demonstrating the course, or pattern, of cultural or natural history in New South Wales.

The Granville Town Hall is of state significance in demonstrating the development of Granville and nearby Parramatta in the late nineteenth century following the opening of the railway in 1855. The building of the Town Hall in 1888 followed closely after the incorporation of Granville as a local government district in 1885. It is an important symbol of the growth of the Granville locality and the rapid development of its sense of identity, from a minor settlement to a fully fledged local community complete with its own local government authority and its own Town Hall.

The place has a strong or special association with a person, or group of persons, of importance of cultural or natural history of New South Wales's history.

The Granville Town Hall is locally significant for its associations with the following people of note:

- Charles Assinder Harding: was born and trained as an architect in England before arriving in Sydney in 1876. He initially worked for Thomas Rowe preparing the drawings for the new Sydney Hospital in Macquarie Street. He left in 1880 to set up his own business as an architect and building surveyor. Examples of his private work include the Grand Central Coffee Palace, the Victoria Arcade, aquariums in Bondi and Manly, the Kiama Hospital and the Granville Council Chambers (1888). Between 1890 and 1904 he was an architect in the Harbours and Rivers Branch of the Department of Public Works and examples of his public work include four new lighthouses, buildings on Garden, Spectacle and Cockatoo Islands, cottages at Trial Bay Prison, government cargo stores, and additions to the pilot stations on the Macleay, Clarence and Manning Rivers.
- James Whitmore Hill: was born and educated in Melbourne, and joined the Victorian Public Works Department at the time it was managed by William Wardell. In 1881, he moved to Sydney and opened an office in Elizabeth Street, then another office in Parramatta where he also lived for the rest of his life. He was active in the life of Parramatta and served as an alderman on the council. He was a successful and prolific architect, and responsible for many domestic and commercial buildings in Parramatta and surrounding districts. Examples of his work include: the Jubilee Hall addition to Parramatta Town Hall; the Convent of the Sisters of Mercy, Parramatta; the Blacktown Council Chambers; Parramatta Primary High School (now the Arthur Phillip High School) and the main auditorium addition to the Granville Council Chambers in 1900. According to the 1907 Cyclopedia of NSW, even though domestic work formed the major part of his practice, he was also responsible for over 100 business premises, four theatres and public halls, and 11 churches and convents.
- John Nobbs: the first mayor and "Father of Granville", who was instrumental in the development of Granville and the construction of the Town Hall.

The place is important in demonstrating aesthetic characteristics and/or a high degree of creative or technical achievement in New South Wales.

The Granville Town Hall is of state significance as a rare and intact example of a Victorian Free Classical government building. Its size, prominence and classical details indicate its public status as the seat of local government, and its façade is a confidently executed example of the Italianate Civic Palace style. It is thought to be one of only two intact nineteenth-century council chamber buildings extant in Sydney's west.

The original 1888 Council Chambers building is a fine example of local government building which uses stucco in a decorative manner to provide a veneer of respectability to a brick building.

The building has undergone extension and minor alterations during the twentieth century, and internally there is an eclectic mix of styles and fashions that reflect the growth of the building over time. Although not in public view, the auditorium has an unusual ceiling of ripple iron with decorative ventilation domes. The decorative use of ripple iron in a large auditorium is considered rare and unusual.

The Granville Town Hall is also a well-known local landmark in Granville.

The place has strong or special association with a particular community or cultural group in New South Wales for social, cultural or spiritual reasons.

Granville Town Hall is of high local significance to the Granville community. It has been used throughout its history as the venue for many major functions and festive occasions in the Granville area. Such activities have included regular meetings for social and cultural activities and these uses are ongoing. Dancing was, and still is, a regular activity held within the auditorium.

The significance of the Granville Town Hall for the wider Sydney and NSW community is reflected in its listing in the following heritage schedules: the Parramatta City Council LEP, the Register of the National Estate and the Register of the National Trust of Australia (NSW). It has been the subject of conservation work by Parramatta City Council since 2000, reflecting the community's high regard for the building.

The place has potential to yield information that will contribute to an understanding of the cultural or natural history of New South Wales.

The auditorium of the Granville Town Hall has some technical significance as an early example of extant ripple iron ceiling combining ventilation domes and exhaust cowls to provide air circulation.

The archaeological potential of the site is considered to be low. This is due to the Town Hall being the first building on the site and occupying the whole site.

The place possesses uncommon, rare or endangered aspects of the cultural or natural history of New South Wales.

Granville Town Hall is of state significance in being a rare example of a Victorian Free Classical government building built in the nineteenth century. It is thought to be one of only two intact nineteenth-century council chamber buildings extant in Sydney's west.

The building is an almost intact, although extended, government building. It has retained its original character and nearly all its fabric, both internally and externally. The decorative use of ripple iron in a large auditorium is considered rare and unusual.

The place is important in demonstrating the principal characteristics of a class of cultural or natural places/environments in New South Wales.

Granville Town Hall is of state significance as a largely intact example of a council chambers building (1888) with an early auditorium (1900). Few such buildings were built and it is thought to be one of only two left in Sydney's west.
