= Henry Cohen (judge) =

Judge and politician in New South Wales, Australia

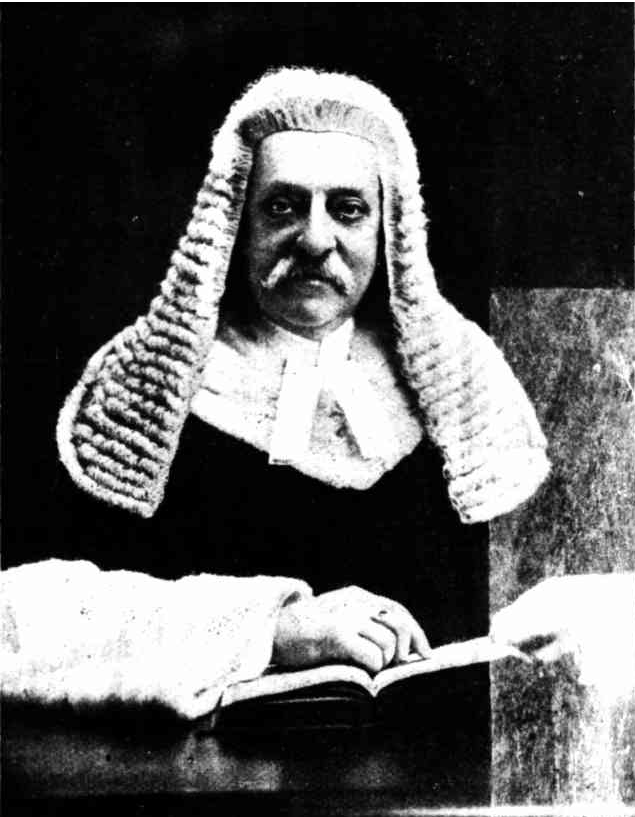

Henry Emanuel Cohen (1 December 1840 – 5 January 1912) was a judge and politician in New South Wales, Australia.

Cohen was born in Port Macquarie, New South Wales, the second son of Abraham Cohen of Sydney. In 1848 his family moved and in 1855 they moved to Goulburn where Cohen attended private schools In 1856 at age 16 he started work as a clerk at David Cohen and Company, first in Sydney then moved to West Maitland until 1864, when he resigned. He went into business with his twin brother George operating a store in Bathurst until it was closed in 1867. He then left for London, where he studied Law at the Middle Temple. In June 1871 he was called to the English Bar, returned to Sydney, and on 15 December 1871 he was admitted to the New South Wales Bar.

On 21 December 1874 Cohen was elected for West Maitland in the New South Wales Legislative Assembly. He was Colonial Treasurer in the James Farnell Ministry from December 1877 to December 1878. In May 1881 he was appointed District Court Judge for the Sydney Metropolitan and Coast District, but resigned the position, and re-entered politics, being Minister of Justice in the Alexander Stuart Cabinet from January 1883 to October 1885.

Cohen was appointed acting judge of the Supreme Court of New South Wales on 19 July 1895, and in 1896 accepted an offer of a permanent position on the bench. Cohen was inaugural president of the Arbitration Court, 1 April 1902 to 3 July 1905.

Fanny, Lady Benjamin (c. 1839 – 18 February 1912), wife of Sir Benjamin Benjamin, MLC and mayor of Melbourne, was a sister.

In December 1910 he requested leave of absence from the Supreme Court. In March 1911 he departed Sydney to visit England, France and Germany. On 5 January 1912 he died on board the SS Friedrich der Grosse. He is buried at Rookwood Cemetery, Sydney.

Parliament of New South Wales
Political offices
Preceded by William Long	Colonial Treasurer; 1877–1878	Succeeded by James Watson
Preceded by William Foster	Minister of Justice; 1883–1885	Succeeded by James Farnell
New South Wales Legislative Assembly
Preceded by Lewis Levy	Member for West Maitland; 1874–1880	Succeeded by James Fulford
Preceded by James Fulford	Member for West Maitland; 1882–1885	Succeeded by Richard Thompson
