= Richard Thompson (Australian politician) =

Australian politician

Richard Windeyer Thompson (1832 – 29 November 1906) was an Australian politician.

He was born in Sydney to surveyor John Thompson and Ann Mary Windeyer. On 27 April 1864 he married Sarah Alice Bedwell, with whom he had eight children. A solicitor, he settled in Maitland in 1865. In 1885 he was elected to the New South Wales Legislative Assembly as the member for West Maitland. A Free Trader, he was re-elected in 1887 and 1889 but was defeated in 1891. Thompson died in West Maitland in 1906.

New South Wales Legislative Assembly
Preceded by Henry Cohen	Member for West Maitland; 1885–1891	Succeeded by John Gillies
