= John Gillies (Australian politician) =

Australian politician

John Gillies (6 March 1844 – 23 September 1911) was a Scottish-born Australian politician.

He was born in Airdrie in Lanarkshire to tailor John Gillies and Janet Mathieson. The family emigrated to the Colony of New South Wales around 1848, where Gillies was educated privately and apprenticed to a compositor at the age of thirteen. On 11 March 1865 he married Margaret Frost Mair; they would have eight children. By 1874 he was part owner of a compositing business, and he was active in the Maitland area. In 1891 he was elected to the New South Wales Legislative Assembly as the Free Trade member for West Maitland. He was in and out of the Free Trade Party for the next decade, and by 1904 he was running as a Progressive before joining the Liberals in 1907. Re-elected as an independent Liberal in 1910, he died at Maitland in 1911.

New South Wales Legislative Assembly
Preceded by Richard Thompson	Member for West Maitland; 1891–1904	Abolished
New seat	Member for Maitland; 1904–1911	Succeeded by Charles Nicholson
