= Wallace Charles Wurth =

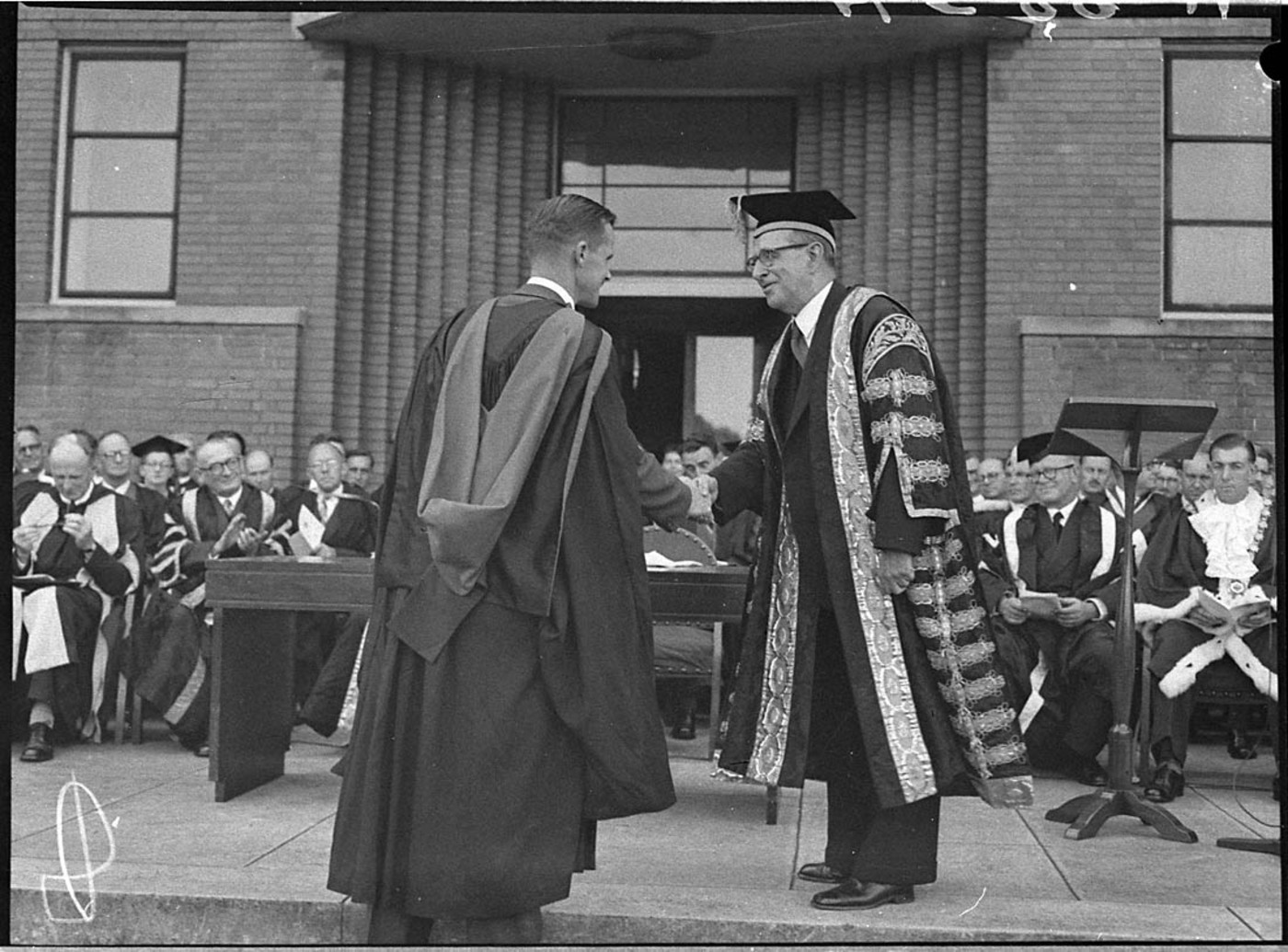
The Chancellor of the New South Wales University of Technology Mr Wallace Wurth presents the degree of Doctor of Philosophy of the School of Mechanical Engineering to Dr AK Johnston at Newcastle University College

Wallace Charles Wurth (14 January 1896 – 16 September 1960) was an Australian public servant, public service head, soldier and university chancellor. Wurth was born in Mudgee, New South Wales and died in Darlinghurst, Sydney, New South Wales.

Wallace Wurth was a member of the New South Wales University of Technology's Developmental Council from 1947 – 1949 and became its first President when the university was established on 1 July 1949. In 1955, the name of this position was changed to Chancellor. In 1958 the New South Wales University of Technology was renamed the University of New South Wales. Wurth continued in his role as the university's chancellor until his death in 1960.
