= James Fullford =

Australian politician

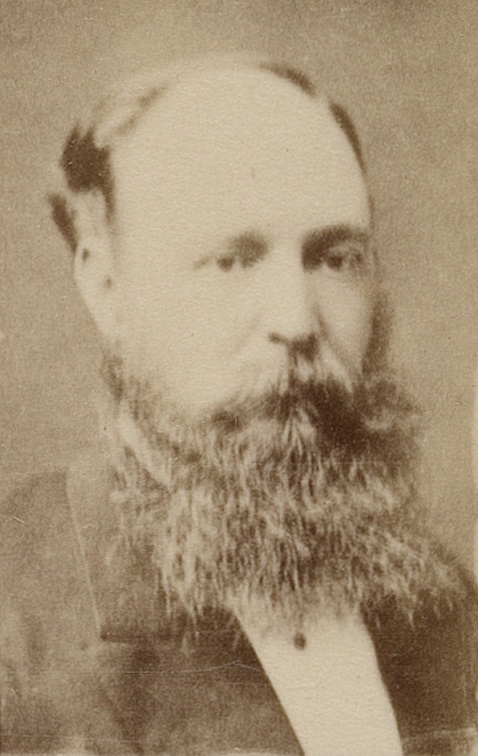

Member for West Maitland (NSW Legislative Assembly)
- In office 25 November 1880 – 23 November 1882

Personal details
- Born: 27 December 1841 West Maitland, New South Wales
- Died: 6 September 1922 (aged 80) Marrickville, New South Wales
- Parents: James Fullford (father); Grace Sophia (née Hartley) (mother)

James Fullford (27 December 1841 – 6 September 1922) was an Australian politician with extensive experience in local government.

Fullford served as the town clerk of West Maitland Municipal Council before being elected as an alderman and holding the position of mayor for two years. He represented the New South Wales West Maitland electorate in the New South Wales Legislative Assembly from November 1880 to November 1882. After a several years as an alderman on Waverley council, Fullford served as an alderman and mayor of the newly-formed Dundas municipality, a district on Sydney's north-western outskirts.

== Biography ==
=== Early years ===
James Fullford was born on 27 December 1841 at West Maitland, the son of James Fullford and Grace Sophia (née Hartley). His father was a publican.

Young James was educated by Mr. Robinson at East Maitland and also attended the Maitland Grammar School.

=== Work and local government ===
As a young man Fullford served on the administrative and clerical staff of the Maitland Mercury.

James Fullford and Emily Jane Atkinson were married at East Maitland on 21 August 1861.

At a meeting of the West Maitland Municipal Council held on 2 January 1868 an election to fill the office of town clerk was carried out, with James Fullford (junior) being elected from a field of sixteen candidates. It was later said of Fullford that during his six-year tenure as council clerk he was "always courteous and obliging to the ratepayers, and never failed to do his duty." He was succeeded as council clerk by Thomas Hughes in late 1874.

In December 1874 the publican's license of Fullford's Family Hotel in West Maitland was transferred from James Fullford (senior) to James Fullford (junior).^{[A]}

In late January 1875 Fullford nominated for election as an alderman in the West Maitland Municipal Council. At the election held on 5 February 1875, Fullford was successful as one of the four newly-elected aldermen. Fullford served as an alderman on West Maitland Municipal Council for six years, from 1875 to 1880, and held the position of mayor in the last two years of his service. At the first meeting of West Maitland Municipal Council for 1879 Alderman Fullford was elected as mayor "without opposition". At a special meeting of the West Maitland Council in early February 1880, Fullford was unanimously re-elected as mayor for the following year, "the aldermen generally paying a high tribute to his ability".

=== Political career ===
In late 1880 Fullford decided to contest the New South Wales elections for the West Maitland electorate. Two candidates were nominated for the electorate, Fullford and the sitting member Henry Emanuel Cohen. Cohen had been elected for the previous two terms as the local member in the New South Wales Legislative Assembly and had served as Colonial Treasurer in the James Farnell ministry from December 1877 to December 1878. At the election held in November 1880 Fullford was elected to represent the West Maitland electorate in the New South Wales Legislative Assembly, defeating the sitting member. Fullford topped the poll with 612 votes (or 58.6 percent).

On 23 November 1882 a notice from Fullford, addressed to "the electors of West Maitland", was published in The Maitland Mercury stating his intention to seek re-election "at the forthcoming election". However within a few days it was reported that Fullford "has announced his intention of not again seeking the suffrages of the electors". Fullford did not re-contest the West Maitland seat at the general election of November 1882.

=== Waverley ===
During his term as a member of the Legislative Assembly Fullford had lived at 'Garfield' in Leichhardt Street, Waverley (in Sydney's Eastern Suburbs), a home he maintained until his death in 1922. After retiring as a member of parliament in 1883 Fullford was elected as an alderman of the Waverley Borough Council.

At the assembly to elect a mayor of Waverley in February 1884, the meeting was held in open council for the first time at the request of Alderman Fullford. The retiring mayor, W. H. Simpson, was re-elected unanimously. Fullford continued to serve as an alderman of Waverley Council until he resigned in about May 1888.

Fullford and his wife had no children of their own but the couple adopted and raised the five children of Fullford's younger brother and his wife, who were orphaned in August 1885.^{[B]}

=== Dundas ===
By 1888 Fullford had turned his attention to a new council area being formed on Sydney's north-western suburban fringe. The area comprising the Dundas municipality was incorporated on 23 March 1889, when the "Borough of Dundas" was proclaimed in the lands east of Parramatta. In April 1889 Fullford declared himself to be a candidate to stand as an alderman for the Dundas Borough Council. The first election of aldermen for the newly-formed municipality took place in May 1889, with twenty candidates contesting nine seats. James Fullford was one of the elected aldermen. The election of the first mayor of the Dundas Municipality took place on 22 May 1889 at the Rydalmere Hall in Rydalmere, with Alderman Fullford being unanimously elected to the position.

At a meeting of Dundas Council in February 1890 Fullford was re-elected as mayor. Fullford was elected mayor of Dundas for the following two years until he retired from the position (and as an alderman) in February 1893. During his period as mayor of Dundas, Fullford resided at 'The Retreat', a ten-room homestead at Ermington on land incorporating a six-acre orchard. At the special meeting of the Dundas Borough Council in February 1893 Frederick C. Cox was elected to the position of mayor. At the same meeting Fullford was nominated for one of the two council auditor positions and was returned unopposed.^{[C]}

=== Return to Waverley ===
Fullford left the Dundas district in February 1893 to return to live in Waverley, though he maintained a continuing connection with Dundas until 1901 by serving in successive years as an auditor of the municipal council.

In January 1894 Fullford placed a newspaper notice advising that he had consented to be nominated as an alderman for the Lawson ward of Waverley Council, but shortly afterwards withdrew his nomination.

Fullford's wife, Emily Jane, died at her residence in Leichhardt Street, Waverley, on 10 October 1895, aged 52. For the last twenty years of her life Emily Fullford had suffered "from a complication of diseases affecting the heart, lungs and kidneys".

In January 1897 Grace Sophia Fullford, James Fullford's eldest niece and adopted daughter, died at his home in Waverley, aged 23.

In December 1903 Fullford was one of two valuers appointed by Waverley council "to make a valuation of all ratable property in the Borough of Waverley for the municipal year 1904-5".

James Fullford died on 6 September 1922, aged 80, at a private hospital at Marrickville.

== Notes ==
A. Fullford's Family Hotel was later renamed Marshall's Excelsior Hotel. In 1901 it was purchased by Thomas A. Dwyer, who renamed it the Royal Hotel.

B. James Fullford's younger brother, William Ralph Fullford, married Mary Ann Dale in May 1873 at St. James' church in Sydney. The couple had the following children: Grace Sophia, born in February 1874 at Balmain; Jemima Maud, born in 1875; Emily, born in 1877; Gertrude Mary, born in 1879; Alice, born in 1881. William R. Fullford died on 10 July 1882 at Balmain, aged 35. Mary Ann Fullford (née Dale), the widow of William R. Fullford, died on 1 August 1885 at Strawberry Hills in Sydney, "after a long and painful illness", aged 35.

C. Many of Fullford's newspaper obituaries claim incorrectly that James Fullford served as mayor of Dundas for thirteen years in succession. The error probably originates from Fullford's entry in the Biographical Register of the New South Wales Parliament 1856-1901 (a standard reference work for any obituary written about a former member of the New South Wales parliament), which states: "mayor Dundas 13 years in succession". James Fullford served as mayor of Dundas for a much shorter period, during the period 22 May 1889 to 15 February 1893.

New South Wales Legislative Assembly
Preceded by Henry Cohen	Member for West Maitland; 1880–1882	Succeeded by Henry Cohen
Civic offices
New title	Mayor of Dundas; 1889 – 1893	Succeeded by Frederick Charles Cox
