= Benjamin Lee (Australian politician) =

Australian politician

Benjamin Lee (5 November 1825 – 15 July 1917) was an English-born Australian politician.

== Early life ==
He was born at Ampthill in Bedfordshire to Benjamin Lee and Lucy Ann Poulton. His family migrated to Sydney in 1829, and Lee was educated at The King's School, Parramatta. He assisted his father on the family properties and in 1857 established himself as a draper at Maitland. On 21 July 1856 he married Sarah Amelia Stephens, with whom he had nine children, 8 daughters and a son. From 1861 to 1874 he was chairman of the Hunter River New Steam Navigation Company, and he was also a squatter and a police magistrate at Bathurst.

== Political career ==
In 1864 he was elected to the New South Wales Legislative Assembly for West Maitland, following a bitter campaign between 3 local men with almost identical policies, notable for personal attacks, and fights between supporters at the declaration of the poll. The Australian Dictionary of Biography described Lee as "normally even-tempered and moderate", however he was involved in the first physical fight in the Legislative Assembly on 27 February 1868. Allan Macpherson taunted Lee, to which Lee responded by punching Macpherson in the face whilst still in the house and Macpherson horsewhipping Lee after he had been ejected by the serjeant-at-arms. He held the seat at the 1869 election and again at 1872 election, serving until his resignation in 1874. He did not hold any ministerial office.

== Later life ==
In 1875, he was a local mining warden, and in 1881 a coroner. In 1890 he was a stipendiary magistrate. Lee died at Annandale on 15 July 1917 (aged 91).

New South Wales Legislative Assembly
Preceded by Elias Weekes	Member for West Maitland; 1864–1874	Succeeded by Lewis Levy
