= Electoral district of West Maitland =

Former state electoral district of New South Wales, Australia

West Maitland was an electoral district for the Legislative Assembly in the Australian State of New South Wales from 1859 to 1904, including the town of Maitland. It was abolished in 1904 due to the re-distribution of electorates following the 1903 New South Wales referendum, which required the number of members of the Legislative Assembly to be reduced from 125 to 90. It was largely replaced by the new district of Maitland and the balance absorbed by Northumberland.

== Members for West Maitland ==
Member	Party	Period
Elias Weekes	None	1859–1864
Benjamin Lee	None	1864–1874
Lewis Levy	None	1874–1874
Henry Cohen	None	1874–1880
James Fulford	None	1880–1882
Henry Cohen	None	1882–1885
Richard Thompson	None	1885–1887
Richard Thompson	Free Trade	1887–1891
John Gillies	Free Trade	1891–1894
John Gillies	Ind. Free Trade	1894–1895
John Gillies	Free Trade	1895–1901
John Gillies	Independent	1901–1904

== Election results ==
1901 New South Wales state election: West Maitland
Party	Candidate	Votes	%	±%
Independent	John Gillies	903	78.8	+14.0
Independent	Richard Proctor	243	21.2	
Total formal votes		1,146	99.7	+0.4
Informal votes		4	0.4	−0.4
Turnout		1,150	45.5	−25.1
Member changed to Independent from Liberal Reform				
