= Lewis Levy =

Australian politician (1815-1885)

Lewis Wolfe Levy
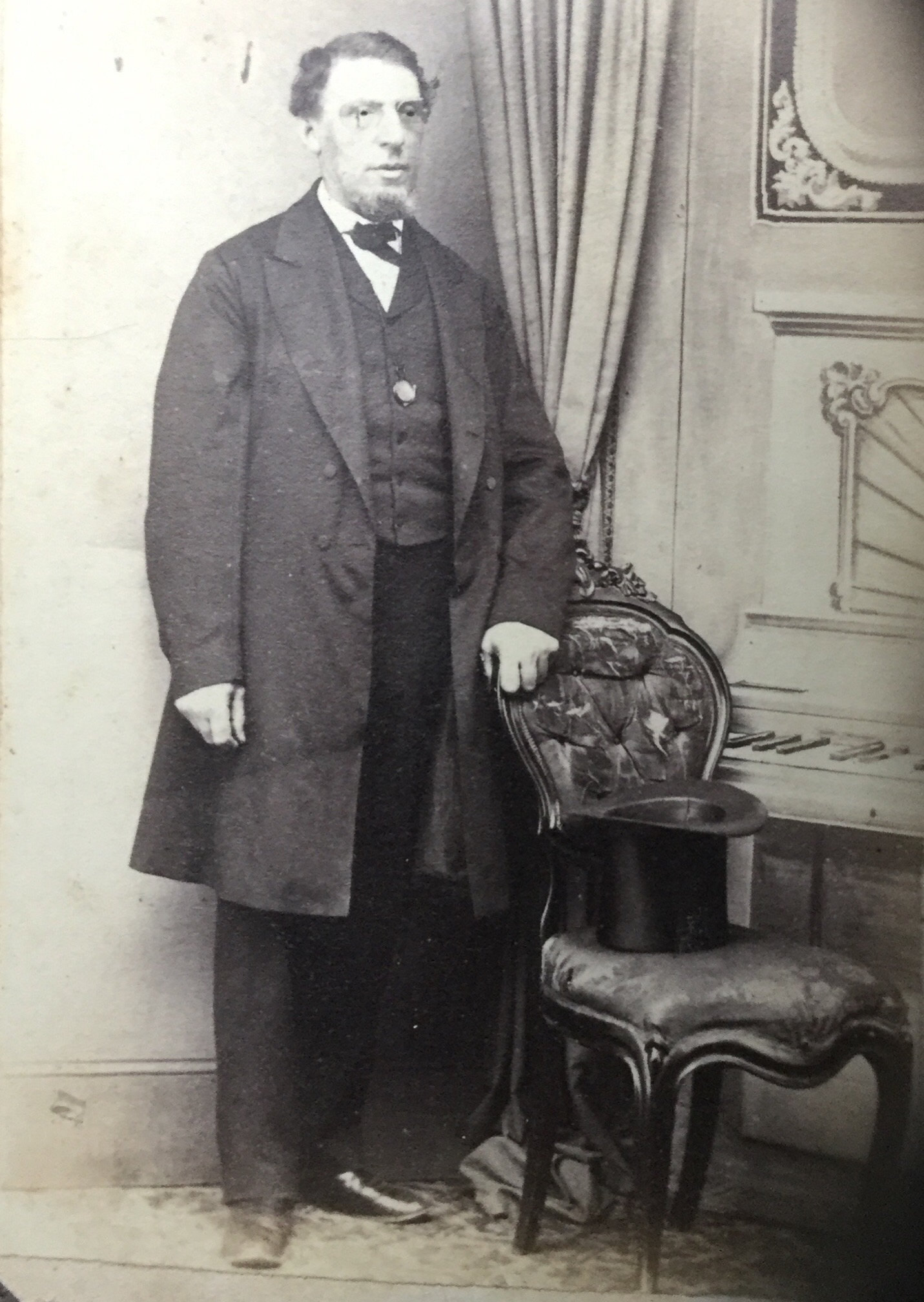
- Hon. Lewis Levy
- Born: 15 June 1815; London, England
- Died: 25 January 1885 (aged 69); Sydney, Australia
- Occupations: Businessman and politician
- Years active: 1840–1885

Lewis Wolfe Levy (13 June 1815 – 25 January 1885) was a 19th-century Australian colonial politician and businessman.

== Life and career ==
Born in London, the son of merchant Benjamin Wolfe Levy (1773–1813) and his wife Martha née Levy (died 1861), he emigrated to Sydney in 1840 and established himself at Maitland, before moving to Tamworth. There, Levy took over an established store and went on to make it into one of the most significant businesses in Tamworth. In 1849 he formed a business partnership with his cousin Abraham Cohen. He was also a gold buyer during the gold rush period in the 1850s. He moved back to Maitland in 1854 and where, in partnership with his cousins David and Samuel Cohen, he helped to run David Cohen & Co. and was central in expanding that business.

His business skills were called on to help manage a number other enterprises. Levy was a director of the Hunter River Steam Navigation Company, the Australian Gas Light Company, the United Insurance Company, the Newcastle Wallsend Coal Co. and the Commercial Banking Company of Sydney.

Yarrowman, a pastoral run on the Liverpool Plains was his by 1871, and Levy was a partner in seven other runs.

Also active in civic service, Levy served as a Justice of the Peace for NSW from October 1858. He was living in Sydney by 1862 where he was a director of the Royal Prince Alfred Hospital and a member of the board of directors of the Indigent Blind Institution.

President of the Macquarie Street Synagogue in Sydney from 1862 to 1874 and again from 1876 to 1877 when it closed, he also served on the board of the Sydney Hebrew School. In 1879 he laid the foundation stone of the Maitland Synagogue. In 1845, Levy married Julia Solomon, who came to New South Wales in 1835. The couple had fifteen children.

Frequent and damaging floods in the Maitland area and the need for flood mitigation prompted him to stand for the New South Wales Parliament in 1871. Levy was elected to the Legislative Assembly for Liverpool Plains, but he did not re-contest in 1872. He was elected for West Maitland in 1874, but again retired at the general election later that year. In 1880 he was appointed to the NSW Legislative Council as a representative of the Jewish community and continued in that role till his death.

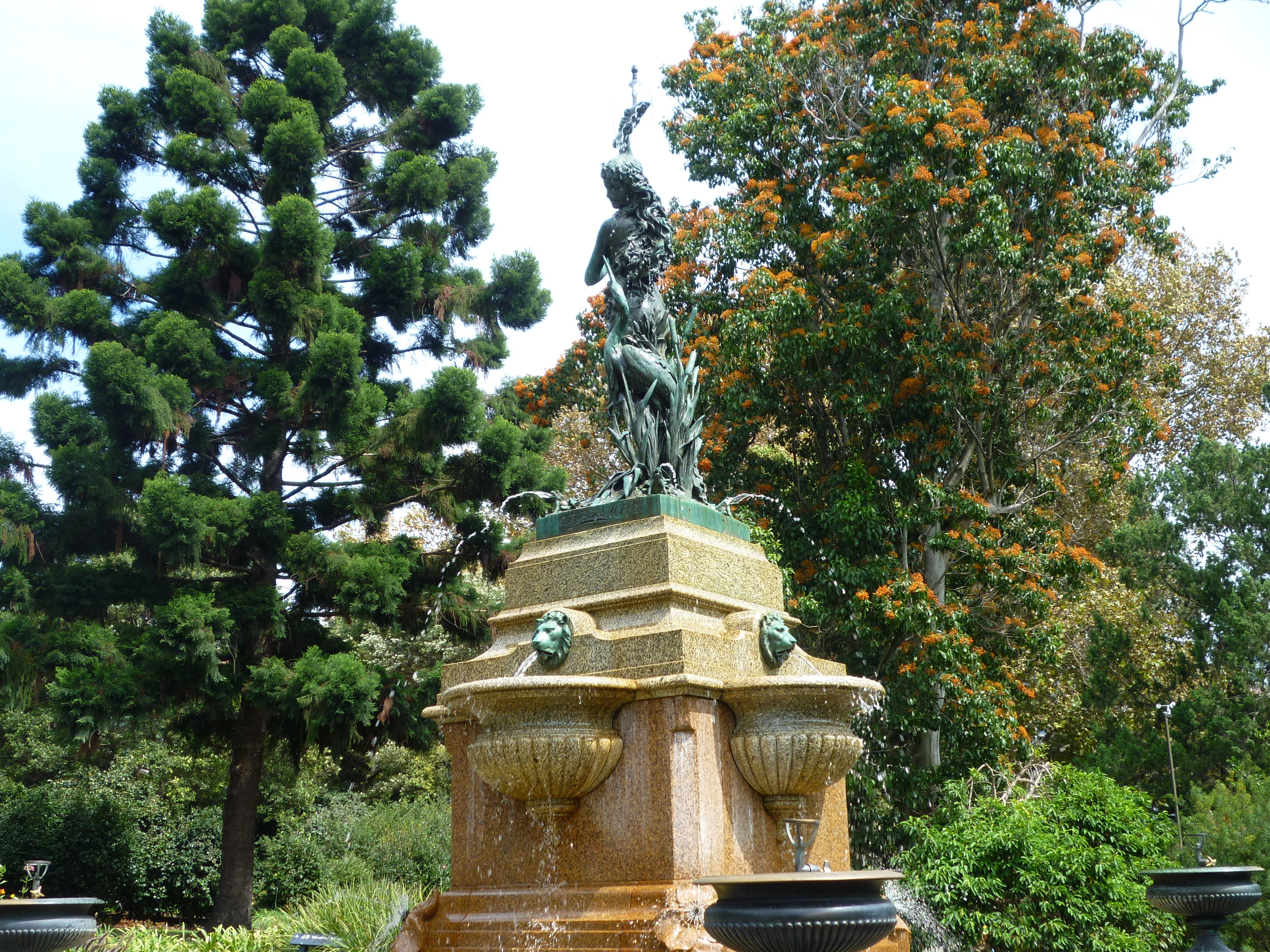
Levy Memorial Drinking Fountain in the Royal Botanic Gardens, Sydney. A gift from the Levy family in memory of the Hon. Lewis Wolfe Levy.

Levy died on 25 January 1885, aged 69, survived by his wife and thirteen of their children. His estate was valued for probate at over £245,000. Most of his estate was left to family and friends with £3,875 bequeathed to various charitable institutions.

An elaborate drinking fountain was built in the Sydney Botanic Gardens in his memory by the Levy family in 1889. Made of polished red and white granite and featuring a bronze figure by sculptor Charles Bell Birch, it was unveiled by Sir Henry Parkes, Premier of New South Wales, at a ceremony on 17 December 1889.

== Sources ==
- Levi, John S (2013). These are the names; Jewish lives in Australia, 1788-1850 (2nd ed.). Melbourne: The Miegunyah Press. pp. 503–4. ISBN 9780522862294.
- Levy family, the (1886) Memoir; Lewis Wolfe Levy, Sydney, John Sands, 29p.
- "The Late L. W. Levy". The Maitland Mercury and Hunter River General Advertiser. 29 January 1885. p. 4 – via Trove.

New South Wales Legislative Assembly
Preceded by Charles Cowper	Member for Liverpool Plains; 1871–1872	Succeeded by Hanley Bennett
Preceded by Benjamin Lee	Member for West Maitland; 1874	Succeeded by Henry Cohen
