= John Clancy (judge) =

Australian judge (1895–1970)

The Honourable Sir John Clancy KBE, CMG

2nd Chancellor of the University of New South Wales
- In office 1960 – June 1970
- Preceded by: Wallace Wurth
- Succeeded by: Sir Robert Webster

Judge of the Supreme Court of New South Wales
- In office 1947–1965

Personal details
- Born: 30 May 1895 Glebe, New South Wales, Australia
- Died: 15 October 1970 (aged 75) Randwick, New South Wales, Australia
- Spouse: Ethel Buckland

Military service
- Allegiance: Australia
- Branch/service: Australian Army
- Years of service: 1914 – 1918
- Battles/wars: World War I; New Guinea campaign

Sir John Sydney James Clancy KBE, CMG (30 May 1895 – 15 October 1970) was an Australian judge and chancellor of the University of New South Wales from 1960 until his retirement in June 1970.

== Early life ==
John Clancy was born on 30 May 1895 in Glebe, New South Wales, to John Clancy, an Irish business man, and his Australian wife, Mary Bradshaw. Educated at Marist Brothers, Parramatta (1907–8); Marist Brothers St Benedicts; Marist Brothers' High School, Darlinghurst, and at the University of Sydney (LL.B., 1925), young Clancy worked as a clerk in the Department of Public Instruction from 12 February 1913. He enlisted in the Australian Naval and Military Expeditionary Force on 11 August 1914, served at Rabaul and was discharged on 18 January 1915. Joining the Australian Imperial Force on 14 January 1916, he fought on the Western Front with the 20th Battalion until wounded in action at Bullecourt during the Battle of Arras on 3 May 1917.

Discharged in Sydney on 2 July 1918, Clancy returned to the department and to his studies. On 22 August 1922 at St Mary's Catholic Cathedral he married Christobel Florence Ethel Buckland, a 24-year-old civil servant. Admitted to the Bar on 30 July 1925, he was attached to the Government Insurance Office in 1926–27 and soon obtained briefs to represent injured workers in compensation cases. His most notable appearance was for the relations of a young coalminer Norman Brown at the inquest into Brown's death which occurred in the violent incident at Rothbury colliery on 16 December 1929. He also appeared for the Rothbury miners in their appeals against convictions for unlawful assembly.

== Judicial career ==
When Jack Lang's government gazetted Clancy's appointment to the District Court bench on 13 November 1931, controversy erupted in the press and the legal profession. One editorialist claimed that the promotion was 'the latest manifestation of the shockingly low level to which the public life of New South Wales has been abased' and that it was 'untenable' to suggest that six years of practice was a fit qualification.

Despite the public outcry, Clancy developed a widely respected judicial career. He served on the District Court and was chairman from 1944 of the Crown Employees Appeal Board. Raised to the Supreme Court in July 1947, he became senior puisne judge and was acting chief justice (1964–65). He was appointed C.M.G. (1964) and K.B.E. (1967).

== Later life ==
In July 1949 Clancy was appointed to the first council of the New South Wales University of Technology (University of New South Wales). In 1953 he became vice-president (a position that was known as Deputy Chancellor from 1955) and in 1960 he became chancellor.

In 1962 he received an honorary Doctor of Letters from the University of New England. On 23 August 1971 the University of New South Wales awarded him a posthumous degree of Doctor of Laws (honoris causa).

Retiring from the bench on 26 May 1965, Clancy retired as Chancellor in June 1970 and died on 15 October 1970 at the Prince of Wales Hospital, Randwick, and was buried in Northern Suburbs cemetery; his wife and daughter, Margaret, survived him.

== See also ==
- List of judges of the Supreme Court of New South Wales

Academic offices
Preceded by Wallace Wurth	Chancellor of the University of New South Wales; 1960 – 1970	Succeeded by Sir Robert Webster
