= List of University of New England (Australia) people =

This is a list of University of New England (Australia) people, including a number of notable alumni and faculty members of the University of New England.

== Alumni ==
=== Academics and educationalists ===
- Don Aitkin, AO, professor of politics at Macquarie University (1971–79) and the Australian National University (1980–1988); Vice-Chancellor of the University of Canberra (1991–2002)
- Kym Anderson, AC, Professor of Economics at the University of Adelaide and the Australian National University; President of the Policy Advisory Council at the Australian Centre for International Agricultural Research
- Peter Crawley, former headmaster of Trinity Grammar School, Victoria, Knox Grammar School and St Hilda's School
- Annette Dobson AM Professor of Biostatistics in the University of Queensland
- Darrell Duffie, Dean Witter Distinguished Professor of Finance at Stanford Graduate School of Business.
- Marilyn Fleer FASSA, professor of early childhood education and development at Monash University
- Anna Halafoff, Associate Professor in Sociology at Deakin University
- Max Hartwell (1921–2009), professor of economic history at the University of New South Wales (1950–56); reader in economic and social history at the University of Oxford; professorial fellow of Nuffield College Oxford (1956–77) (Emeritus 1977); was amongst the first intake of students in 1938 at the New England University College and the first of his cohort to become a professor
- Julienne Kaman, Pro-Chancellor of the University of Goroka
- Keith Leopold (1920–1999), professor of German at the University of Queensland (1964); was amongst the first intake of students in 1938 at the New England University College
- Alan McIntosh, professor of mathematics at the Australian National University
- Kerrie Mengersen FAA FASSA, Distinguished Professor of Statistics at Queensland University of Technology
- Mirka Miller, professor of electrical engineering and computer science at the University of Newcastle.
- James Page, educationist
- John Quiggin, Australian Research Council Federation Fellow in economics and political science
- Tūroa Royal, CNZM QSO ED Māori educationist
- Margaret Trask, AM, librarian, educator and Deputy Chancellor of the University of Technology Sydney
- Brenda Walker, Award-winning novelist and Winthrop Professor of English and Cultural Studies at the University of Western Australia. Sister of Don Walker
- Dr Om Harsh, (Om Kumar Harsh) former Vice-Chancellor of Glocal University and Tantia University, awarded Distinguished Alumni at University of New England in 2018

=== Arts and literature ===
- Amanda Bishop, comedian, actor and musician
- Lewis Fitz-Gerald, actor, writer and director
- Lionel Gilbert, OAM historian
- Joan Kersey, writer, social worker and left-wing activist
- Wendy James, author
- Marshall Moore, American writer
- Gayla Reid, writer
- Don Walker, musician, notably with Cold Chisel. Brother of Brenda Walker.

=== Business ===
- Douglas Daft, AC, former global CEO of Coca-Cola
- Geoffrey Edelsten, businessman and entrepreneur
- Canning Fok Kin-ning, group managing director of Hutchison Whampoa and Chairman of Hongkong Electric Holdings
- Vanessa Guthrie, AO, former Chair of the Minerals Council of Australia, Director of Australian Broadcasting Corporation and Cricket Australia
- Wendy McCarthy, AO, businesswoman, activist, and former Chancelor of the University of Canberra

=== Civil servants ===
- Jock R. Anderson, professor and agricultural economist at the World Bank
- Marie-Louise Ayres, Director-General of the National Library of Australia
- Paul Barratt, AO, former Executive Director at the Business Council of Australia, Secretary of the Department of Primary Industries and Energy, and Secretary of the Department of Defence
- Justin Brown, PSM Australian diplomat who has served as High Commissioner to Canada (2008–2011) and Ambassador to Belgium, Luxembourg, the European Union and NATO (2018– )
- Michele Bullock, governor of the Reserve Bank of Australia
- Kate Dewes, former advisor on peace matters to two United Nations Secretaries-General
- Bernie Fraser, former governor of the Reserve Bank of Australia and former Secretary of the [Australian] Department of the Treasury
- Kate Gilmore, human rights activist and Deputy High Commissioner for Human Rights of the United Nations
- Anne Plunkett, Diplomat, Australian Ambassador to Portugal from 2012 to 2016
- Kerry Schott, AO, former CEO of Sydney Water
- Kathleen Taperell AM (also known as Kathleen Tucker), public servant and feminist

=== Military ===
- Major General Susan Coyle, AM, CSC, DSM, a senior officer in the Australian Army
- Rear Admiral James Goldrick, AO, CSC, senior officer of the Royal Australian Navy
- Major General Cheryl Pearce, AM, CSC, a senior officer in the Australian Army and a former deputy commissioner in the Australian Border Force
- Major General Mick Ryan, AM, former Commander Australian Defence College
- Lieutenant General Simon Stuart, AO, DSC, a senior officer in the Australian Army who has served as the Chief of Army since July 2022

=== Politicians ===
- Natalie Bennett, the Rt Honourable Baroness Bennett, leader of the Green Party of England and Wales
- Don Bowman, former member for Swansea in the New South Wales Legislative Assembly
- Dean Brown, AO, former Premier of South Australia
- David Elliott, the current Member of the New South Wales Legislative Assembly
- Jeremy Hanson, CSC, MLA, former Australian Army officer and is an Australian politician with the Liberal Party, elected to the Australian Capital Territory Legislative Assembly
- Barnaby Joyce, former Deputy Prime Minister of Australia and current Member for New England in the Australian Parliament
- John Kerin, AO, former Member of the Australian Parliament and Federal minister (Primary Industries, Energy, Transport and Communication, Trade and Overseas Development, Treasurer)
- John Knight, Senator for the Australian Capital Territory
- Karunasena Kodituwakku, Sri Lankan politician, academic and diplomat
- Chris Minns, Premier of New South Wales
- Don Page, OAM former Member for Ballina in the New South Wales Legislative Assembly and grandson of Sir Earle Page, founding Chancellor of UNE
- Bill Rixon, former Member for Lismore in the New South Wales Legislative Assembly
- Milena Pires, member of the first National Parliament of East Timor and Permanent Representative to the United Nations
- Cecily Rosol, member for the division of Bass in the House of Assembly
- George Souris, AM, former member Upper Hunter in the New South Wales Legislative Assembly
- Tony Windsor, AM, former Member for Tamworth in the New South Wales Legislative Assembly and former Member for New England in the Australian Parliament

=== Sciences ===
- Lachlan Mackenzie Copeland, botanist
- Catherine King, ecotoxicologist, Antarctic researcher
- Dame Bridget Ogilvie, AC DBE, medical scientist
- Sharon Sullivan AO FAHA, archaeologist
- Mark Strickson, wildlife documentary producer and actor

=== Sport ===
- Suzy Balogh, OAM, 2004 Olympic gold medal shooter
- Katherine Calder, 2010 Winter Olympics cross-country skier
- Roy Masters, AM, sports journalist and former rugby league football coach
- Kathleen Partridge, 1988 Olympic gold medal field hockey; 1992 Olympics (goalkeeper)
- Damian Smith, member of the Australia national rugby union team, Wallaby #707
- Amelia White, 2020 Tokyo Paralympics Para-equestrian

== Administration ==
=== Chancellors ===
Order	Chancellor	Years	Notes
1	Sir Earle Page, KCMG, CH	1954–1960	
2	Phillip Wright, CMG	1960–1970	
3	Sir Frank Kitto, AC, KBE, QC	1970–1981	
4	Rob Robertson-Cuninghame, AO	1981–1993	
5	Pat O'Shane, AM	1994–2003	
6	John Cassidy, AO	2004–2008	
7	Richard Torbay	2008–2013	
8	John Watkins, AM	2013–2014	
9	James Harris, FRSN	2014–2024	
10	Sarah Pearson, GAICD, FTSE	2024–2026	
11	David van Aanholt (Acting)	2026–present	

=== Vice-Chancellors ===
The following people have served as Vice-Chancellor of the University of New England:

- Sir Robert Madgwick, OBE, (1954–1966)
- Sir Zelman Cowen, AK, GCVO, GCMG, PC, QC (1966–1970)
- Alec Lazenby, AO, (1970–1977)
- Ronald Gates, AO (1977–1985)
- Lawrence W Nicol (1985–1988)
- Don McNicol (1988–1990)
- Robert HT Smith, AM, (1990–1994)
- Bruce Thom, AM, (1994–1996)
- Eric Nairn (1997)
- Ingrid Moses, AO, (1997–2006)
- Alan Pettigrew (2006–2010)
- James Barber (2010–2014)
- Annabelle Duncan (2014–2019)
- Brigid Heywood (2019–2022)
- Simon Evans (Acting) (2022–2023)
- Chris Moran (2023–)
