= Electoral results for the district of Northern Tablelands =

Australian district election results

Northern Tablelands, an electoral district of the Legislative Assembly in the Australian state of New South Wales, has had two incarnations: as a two-member district from 1920 to 1927, and as a single-member district from 1981 until the present.

== Members ==
First incarnation (1920–1927)
Election	Member	Party	Member	Party	Member	Party
1920	Michael Bruxner	Progressive	David Drummond	Progressive	Alfred McClelland	Labor
1922	Michael Bruxner	Progressive	David Drummond	Progressive	Alfred McClelland	Labor
1925	Michael Bruxner	Country	David Drummond	Country	Alfred McClelland	Labor
Second incarnation (1981–present)
Election	Member	Party				
1981	Bill McCarthy	Labor				
1984	Bill McCarthy	Labor				
1987 by	Ray Chappell	National				
1988	Ray Chappell	National				
1991	Ray Chappell	National				
1995	Ray Chappell	National				
1999	Richard Torbay	Independent				
2003	Richard Torbay	Independent				
2007	Richard Torbay	Independent				
2011	Richard Torbay	Independent				
2013 by	Adam Marshall	National				
2015	Adam Marshall	National				
2019	Adam Marshall	National				
2024 by	Brendan Moylan	National				

== Election results ==
=== Elections in the 2020s ===
==== 2024 by-election ====
2024 Northern Tablelands state by-election
Party	Candidate	Votes	%	±%
National	Brendan Moylan	31,203	67.9	−3.7
Shooters, Fishers, Farmers	Ben Smith	5,229	11.4	+6.9
Greens	Dorothy Robinson	4,211	9.2	+4.4
Independent	Duncan Fischer	3,292	7.2	+7.2
Independent	Natasha Ledger	1,999	4.4	+3.4
Total formal votes		45,934	97.3	−0.6
Informal votes		1,271	2.7	+0.6
Turnout		47,205	80.2	−7.4
Two-candidate-preferred result
National	Brendan Moylan	33,611	81.9	−1.9
Shooters, Fishers, Farmers	Ben Smith	7,411	18.1	+18.1
National hold		Swing	−1.9	

==== 2023 ====
2023 New South Wales state election: Northern Tablelands
Party	Candidate	Votes	%	±%
National	Adam Marshall	35,575	71.6	−1.8
Labor	Yvonne Langenberg	5,045	10.2	−0.8
Greens	Elizabeth O'Hara	2,369	4.8	−0.8
Shooters, Fishers, Farmers	Michael Hay	2,239	4.5	−5.1
Legalise Cannabis	Peter O'Loghlin	1,148	2.3	+2.3
Independent	Billy Wood	980	2.0	+2.0
Liberal Democrats	Margaret Hammond	783	1.6	+1.6
Sustainable Australia	Alan Crowe	595	1.2	+1.2
Independent	Natasha Ledger	496	1.0	+1.0
Public Education	Gary Hampton	425	0.9	+0.9
Total formal votes		49,655	98.0	−0.1
Informal votes		1,039	2.0	+0.1
Turnout		50,694	87.6	−3.1
Two-party-preferred result
National	Adam Marshall	37,654	83.8	+0.7
Labor	Yvonne Langenberg	7,255	16.2	−0.7
National hold		Swing	+0.7	

=== Elections in the 2010s ===
==== 2019 ====
2019 New South Wales state election: Northern Tablelands
Party	Candidate	Votes	%	±%
National	Adam Marshall	35,766	73.47	+6.78
Labor	Debra O'Brien	5,503	11.30	−4.36
Shooters, Fishers, Farmers	Rayne Single	4,616	9.48	+9.48
Greens	Dorothy Robinson	2,793	5.74	−1.40
Total formal votes		48,678	98.03	+0.22
Informal votes		979	1.97	−0.22
Turnout		49,657	89.68	−0.44
Two-party-preferred result
National	Adam Marshall	37,727	82.84	+5.77
Labor	Debra O'Brien	7,814	17.16	−5.77
National hold		Swing	+5.77	

==== 2015 ====
2015 New South Wales state election: Northern Tablelands
Party	Candidate	Votes	%	±%
National	Adam Marshall	32,247	66.7	+31.1
Labor	Debra O'Brien	7,573	15.7	+10.7
Independent Country	David Mailler	3,471	7.2	+7.2
Greens	Mercurius Goldstein	3,453	7.1	+3.7
Christian Democrats	Holly Beecham	1,115	2.3	+0.9
No Land Tax	Trevor Gay	489	1.0	+1.0
Total formal votes		48,348	97.8	−0.7
Informal votes		1,082	2.2	+0.7
Turnout		49,430	90.1	−2.4
Two-party-preferred result
National	Adam Marshall	34,077	77.1	−0.6
Labor	Debra O'Brien	10,137	22.9	+0.6
National hold		Swing	−0.6	

==== 2013 by-election ====
2013 Northern Tablelands state by-election
Party	Candidate	Votes	%	±%
National	Adam Marshall	27,276	63.3	+35.0
Independent	Jim Maher	5,814	13.5	+13.5
Labor	Herman Beyersdorf	4,190	9.7	+6.3
Independent	Katherine Nicholson	1,845	4.3	+4.3
Greens	Dora Koops	1,782	4.1	+0.8
Independent	Bill Bush	1,270	2.9	+2.9
Christian Democrats	Silvana Nero	912	2.1	+0.5
Total formal votes		43,089	97.1	−1.7
Informal votes		1,304	2.9	+1.8
Turnout		44,393	85.7	+7.5
Two-party-preferred result
National	Adam Marshall	29,817	81.0	+4.9
Labor	Herman Beyersdorf	7,014	19.0	−4.9
National gain from Independent		Swing	+4.9	

Richard Torbay (Independent) resigned.

==== 2011 ====
2011 New South Wales state election: Northern Tablelands
Party	Candidate	Votes	%	±%
Independent	Richard Torbay	29,526	63.4	−9.3
National	Charlie McCowen	13,199	28.3	+10.6
Labor	Sarah Frazier	1,580	3.4	−0.9
Greens	Pat Schultz	1,531	3.3	+0.1
Christian Democrats	Isabel Strutt	736	1.6	−0.4
Total formal votes		46,572	98.8	−0.2
Informal votes		547	1.2	+0.2
Turnout		47,119	93.2	
Notional two-party-preferred count
National	Charlie McCowen	21,383	76.1	+7.3
Labor	Sarah Frazier	6,726	23.9	−7.3
Two-candidate-preferred result
Independent	Richard Torbay	31,247	69.4	−10.8
National	Charlie McCowen	13,756	30.6	+10.8
Independent hold		Swing	−10.8	

=== Elections in the 2000s ===
==== 2007 ====
2007 New South Wales state election: Northern Tablelands
Party	Candidate	Votes	%	±%
Independent	Richard Torbay	32,615	72.7	+8.8
National	Phillip Kelly	7,951	17.7	−2.1
Labor	Phil Usher	1,947	4.3	−2.0
Greens	Vanessa Bible	1,418	3.2	−0.7
Christian Democrats	Isabel Strutt	904	2.0	+0.0
Total formal votes		44,835	99.0	+0.1
Informal votes		442	1.0	−0.1
Turnout		45,277	93.0	
Notional two-party-preferred count
National	Phillip Kelly	13,256	68.8	+5.4
Labor	Phil Usher	6,019	31.2	−5.4
Two-candidate-preferred result
Independent	Richard Torbay	34,420	80.2	+0.3
National	Phillip Kelly	8,471	19.8	−0.3
Independent hold		Swing	+0.2	

==== 2003 ====
2003 New South Wales state election: Northern Tablelands
Party	Candidate	Votes	%	±%
Independent	Richard Torbay	28,149	71.3	+27.1
National	Peter Bailey	6,076	15.4	−18.7
Labor	Michaela Fogarty	1,870	4.7	−4.5
Greens	Brendon Perrin	1,632	4.1	+2.3
Christian Democrats	Isabel Strutt	829	2.1	+2.1
Independent	John Irvine	457	1.2	+1.2
One Nation	James Donald	455	1.2	−5.9
Total formal votes		39,468	99.0	+0.2
Informal votes		414	1.0	−0.2
Turnout		39,882	93.0	
Notional two-party-preferred count
National	Peter Bailey	9,382	60.9	−6.8
Labor	Michaela Fogarty	6,029	39.1	+6.8
Two-candidate-preferred result
Independent	Richard Torbay	30,691	82.4	+23.0
National	Peter Bailey	6,569	17.6	−23.0
Independent hold		Swing	+23.0	

=== Elections in the 1990s ===
==== 1999 ====
1999 New South Wales state election: Northern Tablelands
Party	Candidate	Votes	%	±%
Independent	Richard Torbay	17,329	44.2	+25.0
National	Ray Chappell	13,381	34.1	−18.7
Labor	Martin Lawrence	3,598	9.2	−14.9
One Nation	John Webeck	2,770	7.1	+7.1
Democrats	Merran Cooper	1,092	2.8	+2.6
Greens	Pat Schultz	719	1.8	+1.8
Independent	Noel Keogh	360	0.9	+0.9
Total formal votes		39,249	98.7	+3.0
Informal votes		509	1.3	−3.0
Turnout		39,758	93.9	
Notional two-party-preferred count
National	Ray Chappell	18,063	67.7	+3.1
Labor	Martin Lawrence	8,612	32.3	−3.1
Two-candidate-preferred result
Independent	Richard Torbay	21,162	59.4	+59.4
National	Ray Chappell	14,482	40.6	−24.0
Independent gain from National		Swing	N/A	

==== 1995 ====
1995 New South Wales state election: Northern Tablelands
Party	Candidate	Votes	%	±%
National	Ray Chappell	17,823	52.0	−2.6
Labor	Steve Funnell	8,284	24.2	−7.4
Independent	Joe Harrold	7,262	21.2	+21.2
Natural Law	Ruth Chant	923	2.7	+2.7
Total formal votes		34,292	95.7	+1.6
Informal votes		1,537	4.3	−1.6
Turnout		35,829	93.6	
Two-party-preferred result
National	Ray Chappell	20,373	63.7	+2.2
Labor	Steve Funnell	11,610	36.3	−2.2
National hold		Swing	+2.2	

==== 1991 ====
1991 New South Wales state election: Northern Tablelands
Party	Candidate	Votes	%	±%
National	Ray Chappell	18,220	54.6	−9.5
Labor	Janice Knight	10,544	31.6	+4.2
Democrats	Fiona Richardson	1,370	4.1	−1.2
Citizens Electoral Council	Rob Taber	1,287	3.9	+3.9
Independent	Peter Worthing	1,220	3.7	+3.7
Independent	Stewart Scott-Irving	740	2.2	+2.2
Total formal votes		33,381	94.1	−3.7
Informal votes		2,083	5.9	+3.7
Turnout		35,464	93.9	
Two-party-preferred result
National	Ray Chappell	19,226	61.5	−7.1
Labor	Janice Knight	12,041	38.5	+7.1
National hold		Swing	−7.1	

=== Elections in the 1980s ===
==== 1988 ====
1988 New South Wales state election: Northern Tablelands
Party	Candidate	Votes	%	±%
National	Ray Chappell	19,933	65.8	+15.2
Labor	Kenneth McClenaghan	8,131	26.8	−22.4
Democrats	Anthony Lawarick	2,232	7.4	+7.4
Total formal votes		30,296	97.8	−0.9
Informal votes		673	2.2	+0.9
Turnout		30,969	94.4	
Two-party-preferred result
National	Ray Chappell	20,619	69.0	+18.3
Labor	Kenneth McClenaghan	9,258	31.0	−18.3
National hold		Swing	+18.3	

==== 1987 by-election ====
1987 Northern Tablelands by-election Saturday 23 May
Party	Candidate	Votes	%	±%
National	Ray Chappell	14,790	52.6	+52.6
Labor	Thelma McCarthy	13,347	47.4	−4.2
Total formal votes		28,137	98.7	−0.1
Informal votes		381	1.3	+0.1
Turnout		28,518	85.3	−8.8
National gain from Labor		Swing	+4.2	

Labor party member, Bill McCarthy resigned due to ill health, dying 3 days later.

==== 1984 ====
1984 New South Wales state election: Northern Tablelands
Party	Candidate	Votes	%	±%
Labor	Bill McCarthy	15,335	51.6	−1.3
National	Claude Cainero	14,383	48.4	+1.3
Total formal votes		29,718	98.8	+0.4
Informal votes		364	1.2	−0.4
Turnout		30,082	94.1	+1.9
Labor hold		Swing	−1.3	

==== 1981 ====
1981 New South Wales state election: Northern Tablelands
Party	Candidate	Votes	%	±%
Labor	Bill McCarthy	15,474	52.9	+4.8
National Country	John Tregurtha	13,782	47.1	−4.8
Total formal votes		29,256	98.4	
Informal votes		468	1.6	
Turnout		29,724	92.2	
Labor notional gain from National Country		Swing	+4.8	

District recreated

==== 1927–1981 ====
District abolished

=== Elections in the 1920s ===
==== 1925 ====
1925 New South Wales state election: Northern Tablelands
Party	Candidate	Votes	%	±%
Quota		5,924		
Progressive	Michael Bruxner (elected 1)	9,944	42.0	+2.9
Progressive	David Drummond (elected 3)	3,125	13.2	−1.8
Progressive	Daniel Lewis	881	3.7	+3.7
Labor	Alfred McClelland (elected 2)	8,464	35.7	+8.7
Labor	William McArdle	946	4.0	+1.0
Labor	Dennis Shanahan	335	1.4	+1.4
Total formal votes		23,695	96.2	+0.8
Informal votes		924	3.8	−0.8
Turnout		24,619	68.0	+2.5
Party total votes
Progressive		13,950	58.9	+2.4
Labor		9,745	41.1	+9.3

==== 1922 ====
1922 New South Wales state election: Northern Tableland
Party	Candidate	Votes	%	±%
Quota		5,819		
Progressive	Michael Bruxner (elected 1)	9,094	39.1	+15.6
Progressive	David Drummond (elected 3)	3,493	15.0	+5.0
Progressive	James McIlveen	563	2.4	+2.4
Labor	Alfred McClelland (elected 2)	6,276	27.0	−2.5
Labor	Phillip Killey	704	3.0	+3.0
Labor	Amos Clarke	422	1.8	+1.8
Nationalist	David Doull	1,532	6.6	+6.6
Nationalist	George Ring	872	3.7	+3.7
Nationalist	Albert Head	318	1.4	+1.4
Total formal votes		23,274	95.4	+1.8
Informal votes		1,122	4.6	−1.8
Turnout		24,396	65.5	+8.1
Party total votes
Progressive		13,150	56.5	+7.5
Labor		7,402	31.8	−5.4
Nationalist		2,722	11.7	−2.0

==== 1920 ====
1920 New South Wales state election: Northern Tableland
Party	Candidate	Votes	%	±%
Quota		4,853		
Progressive	Michael Bruxner (elected 2)	4,553	23.5	
Progressive	David Drummond (elected 3)	1,949	10.0	
Progressive	Follet Thomas (defeated)	1,506	7.8	
Progressive	John Crapp	864	4.5	
Progressive	Patrick Little	644	3.3	
Labor	Alfred McClelland (elected 1)	5,729	29.5	
Labor	Joseph Byrne	1,499	7.7	
Nationalist	Herbert Lane (defeated)	2,199	11.3	
Nationalist	Leonard Francis	468	2.4	
Total formal votes		19,411	93.6	
Informal votes		1,320	6.4	
Turnout		20,731	57.4	
Party total votes
Progressive		9,516	49.0	
Labor		7,228	37.2	
Nationalist		2,667	13.7	
