= 2024 Northern Tablelands state by-election =

- 22 June 2024

Electoral district of Northern Tablelands in the New South Wales Legislative Assembly
	First party	Second party
		SFF
Candidate	Brendan Moylan	Ben Smith
Party	National	SFF
Popular vote	31,203	5,229
Percentage	67.9%	11.4%
Swing	▼3.7	▲6.9
TPP	81.9%	18.1%
TPP swing	▼1.9	▲1.9
MP before election
Adam Marshall
Nationals
Elected MP
Brendan Moylan
Nationals

A by-election was held in the New South Wales Legislative Assembly seat of Northern Tablelands on 22 June 2024, following the resignation of National Party MP Adam Marshall.

== Background ==
The by-election was triggered by the resignation of sitting Nationals MP Adam Marshall, who had held the seat since the 2013.

Northern Tablelands is one of the most conservative seats in NSW, and has been a heartland for the National Party for over a century. While Labor traditionally does poorly in rural New South Wales (particularly rural northeastern New South Wales), Northern Tablelands is particularly hostile territory for Labor even by this region's standards. Northern Tablelands mostly overlaps with the equally conservative federal seat of New England, which is also a longstanding National stronghold.

Labor usually runs dead in the seat, and therefore did not contest the by-election.

Marshall won 83.8% of the two-party-preferred vote at the 2023 state election, which is equal to a 33.8% margin on the Mackerras pendulum, emphasising that Northern Tablelands can be classified as a very safe seat, and the safest seat for any party in the New South Wales Legislative Assembly. Additionally, excluding by-election results or redistributions, Northern Tablelands is the seventh-safest seat for any party in any Australian state parliament, and the safest outside Western Australia.

=== Previous results ===
2023 New South Wales state election: Northern Tablelands
Party	Candidate	Votes	%	±%
National	Adam Marshall	35,575	71.6	−1.8
Labor	Yvonne Langenberg	5,045	10.2	−0.8
Greens	Elizabeth O'Hara	2,369	4.8	−0.8
Shooters, Fishers, Farmers	Michael Hay	2,239	4.5	−5.1
Legalise Cannabis	Peter O'Loghlin	1,148	2.3	+2.3
Independent	Billy Wood	980	2.0	+2.0
Liberal Democrats	Margaret Hammond	783	1.6	+1.6
Sustainable Australia	Alan Crowe	595	1.2	+1.2
Independent	Natasha Ledger	496	1.0	+1.0
Public Education	Gary Hampton	425	0.9	+0.9
Total formal votes		49,655	98.0	−0.1
Informal votes		1,039	2.0	+0.1
Turnout		50,694	87.6	−3.1
Two-party-preferred result
National	Adam Marshall	37,654	83.8	+0.7
Labor	Yvonne Langenberg	7,255	16.2	−0.7
National hold		Swing	+0.7	

== Candidates ==
Candidates are listed in ballot order:

Party	Candidate	Background
Shooters, Fishers and Farmers	Ben Smith	
Greens	Dorothy Robinson	Armidale Regional Councillor
Independent	Natasha Ledger	2023 candidate
Independent	Duncan Fischer	Businessman
National	Brendan Moylan	Solicitor

== Key dates ==
Key dates in relation to the by-election are:

- 31 May 2024 – Issue of writ, Close of rolls
- 6 June 2024 – Close of nominations
- 7 June 2024 – Declaration of nominations
- 15 June 2024 – Commencement of early voting
- 17 June 2024 – Applications for postal voting closes
- 22 June 2024 – Polling day
- 12 July 2024 – Return of writ

== Results ==
2024 Northern Tablelands state by-election
Party	Candidate	Votes	%	±%
National	Brendan Moylan	31,203	67.9	−3.7
Shooters, Fishers, Farmers	Ben Smith	5,229	11.4	+6.9
Greens	Dorothy Robinson	4,211	9.2	+4.4
Independent	Duncan Fischer	3,292	7.2	+7.2
Independent	Natasha Ledger	1,999	4.4	+3.4
Total formal votes		45,934	97.3	−0.6
Informal votes		1,271	2.7	+0.6
Turnout		47,205	80.2	−7.4
Two-candidate-preferred result
National	Brendan Moylan	33,611	81.9	−1.9
Shooters, Fishers, Farmers	Ben Smith	7,411	18.1	+18.1
National hold		Swing	−1.9	

== See also ==
- 2013 Northern Tablelands state by-election
- Electoral results for the district of Northern Tablelands
- List of New South Wales state by-elections
