= 2013 Northern Tablelands state by-election =

Election result for Northern Tablelands, New South Wales, Australia

- 25 May 2013
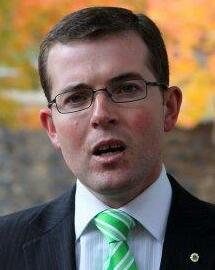

	First party	Second party	Third party
			IND
Candidate	Adam Marshall	Herman Beyersdorf	Jim Maher
Party	National	Labor	Independent
Popular vote	27,276	4,190	5,814
Percentage	63.3%	9.7%	13.5%
Swing	▲35.0	▲6.3	▲13.5
TPP	81.0%	19.0%
TPP swing	▲4.9	▼4.9
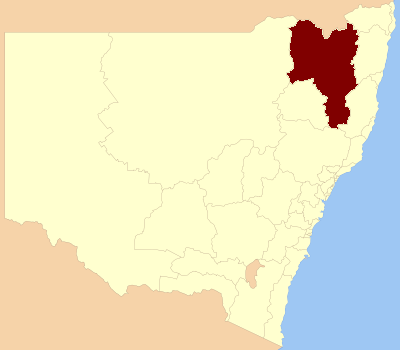
- The location of the seat of Northern Tablelands in New South Wales
MP before election
Richard Torbay
Independent
Elected MP
Adam Marshall
National

A by-election was held for the New South Wales Legislative Assembly seat of Northern Tablelands on 25 May 2013. The by-election was triggered by the resignation of independent member Richard Torbay, which was announced on 20 March 2013. Adam Marshall was declared elected on 28 May 2013.

== Dates ==
Date	Event
22 April 2013	Writ of election issued by the Speaker of the Legislative Assembly.
22 April 2013	Close of electoral rolls
8 May 2013	Close of party nominations
9 May 2013	Close of independent nominations
13 May 2013	Early voting began
25 May 2013	Polling day, between the hours of 8 am and 6 pm
7 June 2013	Return of the Writ of election was due

== Background ==
The seat became vacant when the former Speaker of the New South Wales Legislative Assembly and Member for Northern Tablelands, Richard Torbay, who was the endorsed candidate for the Nationals for the federal seat of New England, suddenly resigned from State Parliament. Immediately prior to his resignation, the National disendorsed Torbay as preselected candidate for New England. It was claimed that his resignation was due to the controversy surrounding his ownership of more than twenty Centrelink buildings dating back to the era when John Howard was Prime Minister.

Former mayor of Gunnedah Shire, Adam Marshall, won preselection as the Nationals nominee ahead of Jock Laurie and Claire Coulton.

== Controversies ==
During the campaign it was reported in the Armidale Express that Marshall had been a financial member of both the Labor and the National parties between 2001 and 2003; by the time his membership of the former expired in 2004, he was employed as a staff member for the then Independent Member for Tamworth, Peter Draper.

One week prior to the by-election, Mal Peters, a councillor of Inverell Shire Council referred a matter of an undisclosed nature relating to Marshall to the Independent Commission Against Corruption. Marshall claimed that Peters' actions were spurious and questioned the timing of the complaint.

== Candidates ==
The seven candidates in ballot paper order were:

Candidate nominations
Independent	Bill Bush	
Nationals	Adam Marshall	Former mayor of Gunnedah Shire
Australian Greens	Dora Koops	
Labor Party	Herman Beyersdorf	Deputy Mayor of Armidale Dumaresq Shire
Independent	Katherine Nicholson	
Independent	Jim Maher	Mayor of the Armidale Dumaresq Shire
Christian Democratic Party	Silvana Nero	

== Results ==
Northern Tablelands by-election Saturday 25 May
Party	Candidate	Votes	%	±%
National	Adam Marshall	27,276	63.3	+35.0
Independent	Jim Maher	5,814	13.5	+13.5
Labor	Herman Beyersdorf	4,190	9.7	+6.3
Independent	Katherine Nicholson	1,845	4.3	+4.3
Greens	Dora Koops	1,782	4.1	+0.8
Independent	Bill Bush	1,270	2.9	+2.9
Christian Democrats	Silvana Nero	912	2.1	+0.5
Total formal votes		43,089	97.1	−1.7
Informal votes		1,304	2.9	+1.8
Turnout		44,393	85.7	+7.5
Two-party-preferred result
National	Adam Marshall	29,817	81.0	+4.9
Labor	Herman Beyersdorf	7,014	19.0	−4.9
National gain from Independent		Swing	+4.9	

== See also ==
- Electoral results for the district of Northern Tablelands
- List of New South Wales state by-elections
