= Tjandamurra =

Tjandamurra may refer to:

- Jandamarra (c. 1873–1897), an Indigenous Australian warrior who led armed insurrections in the 19th century
- Tjandamurra O'Shane (born 1990), an Indigenous Australian man who was the victim of a fire attack as a boy, in 1996
