= 1987 Northern Tablelands state by-election =

Election result for Northern Tablelands, New South Wales, Australia

A by-election was held for the New South Wales Legislative Assembly electorate of Northern Tablelands on 23 May 1987. The by-election was triggered by the resignation due to ill health of sitting Labor party member, Bill McCarthy, who died 3 days later. McCathy's widow Thelma was the Labor candidate at the by-election.

== Dates ==
Date	Event
22 April 1987	Bill McCarthy resigned from parliament.
25 April 1987	Death of Bill McCarthy.
1 May 1987	Writ of election issued by the Speaker of the Legislative Assembly.
7 May 1987	Nominations
23 May 1987	Polling day
12 June 1987	Return of writ

== Results ==
1987 Northern Tablelands by-election Saturday 23 May
Party	Candidate	Votes	%	±%
National	Ray Chappell	14,790	52.6	+52.6
Labor	Thelma McCarthy	13,347	47.4	−4.2
Total formal votes		28,137	98.7	−0.1
Informal votes		381	1.3	+0.1
Turnout		28,518	85.3	−8.8
National gain from Labor		Swing	+4.2	

== See also ==
- Electoral results for the district of Northern Tablelands
- List of New South Wales state by-elections
