= Phillip Wright =

Phillip Wright CMG

2nd Chancellor of the University of New England
- In office 1960–1970
- Preceded by: Sir Earle Page
- Succeeded by: Sir Frank Kitto

Personal details
- Born: Phillip Arundell Wright; 20 July 1889 Wongwibinda, New South Wales, Australia
- Died: 30 August 1970 (aged 81) Wallamumbi, New South Wales, Australia
- Children: Judith Wright

Phillip Arundell Wright, CMG (20 July 1889 – 30 August 1970), Australian pastoralist and philanthropist, was the second Chancellor of the University of New England from 1960 until 1970.

== Biography ==
Born on the property Wongwibinda, near Armidale, New South Wales in 1889, Wright was the sixth child of Albert and May Wright (née Mackenzie). His father died in 1890, and Phillip was raised by his mother, who carried on the running of the Wongwibinda station east of Armidale after her husband's death and subsequently purchased Wallamumbi, properties that formed the basis of the Wright family's holdings for one hundred years. Wright was home-schooled by his sister, and then attended Sydney Church of England Grammar School, and Bedford School in England. For his entire life he carried an appreciation for the value of a formal education.

Wright was one of leading figures in the establishment of the New England University College in 1938, and was a donor to the college from the beginning. Wright served on the advisory council of the university from its establishment, serving as vice-chairman and later deputy chancellor from 1943 until 1960. Upon the retirement of Sir Earle Page as the chancellor of the university in 1960, Wright was named as his successor.

Phillip Wright died in 1970 on his principal property of Wallamumbi, near Armidale. He was succeeded as chancellor by Sir Frank Kitto. A great philanthropist to the university, Wright donated property, resources, prizes and a mace over the years of his association with the institution. In return, the university named Wright College and later the Wright Village after him, as was the original fountain in the central courtyard of the university.

Wright was the father of the poet and conservationist Judith Wright.

== See also ==
- List of University of New England people

Academic offices
Preceded by Sir Earle Page	Chancellor of the University of New England; 1960–1970	Succeeded by Sir Frank Kitto
