= Gladys Dorothy O'Shane =

Australian Aboriginal political activist

Gladys Dorothy O’Shane
- Born: 22 September 1919
- Died: 29 December 1965; Cairns, Queensland, Australia
- Resting place: Martyn Street Cemetery
- Occupation: Indigenous rights activist
- Spouse: Patrick James O'Shane
- Children: Five - Pat(F), Margaret(F), Terry(M), Daniel(M), Timothy(M)

Gladys Dorothy O’Shane (22 September 1919 - 29 December 1965) was an Australian Aboriginal activist, the sixth child of parents Caroline, née Brown, and Edgar Davis, a labourer, at Mossman, Queensland.

== Early life ==
O'Shane attended primary school and later worked as a domestic servant at Mossman Hospital laundry, and lived with her family at Yarrabah Mission, Cairns, Queensland, Australia. O'Shane married Patrick James O’Shane, a 27-year-old militant trade unionist, wharf labourer, and cane cutter on 26 October 1940 at the Assembly of God Tabernacle, Cairns, and moved to Mossman.

O'Shane had two daughters and three sons. Her eldest daughter Pat O'Shane was the first Aboriginal Magistrate in New South Wales, and Chancellor of the University of New England. Terry, Margaret, Daniel, and Timothy, the children of O'Shane, also contributed to Aboriginal Communities.

== Honours and Organisations ==
O'Shane was the inaugural president of the Cairns Aboriginal and Torres Strait Islanders Advancement League (CATSIAL) and addressed the strike meetings of the Waterside Workers' Federation of Australia as a member of its Women Auxiliary wing.

In 1959, O'Shane and her eldest daughter, Pat, became members of the Communist Party of Australia. In 1964, O'Shane was an elected committee member of the North Queensland Committee of the Communist Party of Australia (CPA). O'Shane was noted as a "leader in Aboriginal advancement" at the 1966 Annual conference of the Federal Council for the Advancement of Aborigines and Torres Strait Islanders.

O'Shane suffered from renal disease, and died of cardiac arrest on 29 December 1965 at Base Hospital, Cairns. She was buried in Martyn Street Cemetery.
