= Rob Robertson-Cuninghame =

Australian scholar (1924–2010)

Rob Robertson-Cuninghame AO

4th Chancellor of the University of New England
- In office 1981–1993
- Preceded by: Sir Frank Kitto
- Succeeded by: Pat O'Shane

Personal details
- Born: 31 May 1924
- Died: 10 September 2010 (aged 86)
- Education: University of Sydney; University of Oxford

Robert Clarence Robertson-Cuninghame, AO (31 May 1924 – 10 September 2010), an Australian pastoralist and academic, was the fourth Chancellor of the University of New England, serving between 1981 and 1993.

== Biography ==
A descendant of Frederick Robert White, the builder of Booloominbah, Robertson-Cuninghame was educated at The Armidale School and the University of Sydney where he lived at St Andrew's College and studied for a Bachelor of Science in agriculture, before winning a Rhodes Scholarship to Oxford in 1949.

Robertson-Cuninghame served as patron to the UNE Union, who in 2003 named the central cafeteria Dr Rob's in his honour. Today, the university also offers the Robertson-Cuninghame Honours Scholarship for honours students, which has also been named after the former Chancellor.

== See also ==
- List of University of New England people

Academic offices
| Preceded by Sir Frank Kitto | Chancellor of the University of New England; 1981–1993 | Succeeded by Pat O'Shane |
