= Electoral district of Northern Tablelands =

District of New South Wales, Australia

Northern Tablelands New South Wales—Legislative Assembly
- Interactive map of district boundaries from the 2023 state election
- State: New South Wales
- Dates current: 1920–1927, 1981–present
- MP: Brendan Moylan
- Party: National
- Namesake: Northern Tablelands
- Electors: 58,873 (2024)
- Area: 53,153.76 km^{2} (20,522.8 sq mi)
- Demographic: Provincial and rural
Electorates around Northern Tablelands:
Queensland	Queensland	Lismore
Barwon	Northern Tablelands	Clarence
Barwon	Tamworth; Upper Hunter	Oxley

Northern Tablelands is an electoral district of the Legislative Assembly of the Australian state of New South Wales. It has been held by Brendan Moylan of the National Party since a 2024 by-election.

The electorate in on the border with Queensland and includes Uralla Shire, Armidale Regional Council, Glen Innes Severn, Inverell Shire, Gwydir Shire and Moree Plains Shire.

== History ==
Northern Tablelands was originally created in 1920, with the introduction of proportional representation, replacing Armidale, Gough and Tenterfield, and elected three members. It was held by the same three members throughout its first incarnation: inaugural Country Party leader Michael Bruxner, state Minister for Education David Drummond, and Labor MP Alfred McClelland, grandfather of former federal Attorney-General Robert McClelland. In 1927, it was divided into the single-member electorates of Armidale and Tenterfield. It was recreated in 1981, partly replacing Armidale and Tenterfield.

On its recreation in 1981, the seat was a notional National Country seat. However, Labor's Bill McCarthy, who had won Armidale in the "Wranslide" of 1978, won the merged seat in the second "Wranslide." McCarthy held the seat for Labor against aggressive National Country/National opposition even as this already conservative area became even more so. He was only the second Labor member to represent much of the area in the single-member era, and most of the seat was served by the safe federal National seat of New England.

McCarthy had developed serious health problems by the 1984 state election, but was persuaded to recontest to maintain Labor control of the seat. He resigned in 1987 when it was apparent he could not continue, and died soon afterward. Labor endorsed McCarthy's widow, Thelma, at the subsequent by-election, but she was narrowly defeated by National candidate Ray Chappell after a heavily-publicised campaign. The seat's conservative nature reasserted itself, and Chappell was re-elected with little difficulty three times. However, in the 1999 election, Chappell faced a challenge from the popular ex-mayor of Armidale, Richard Torbay, standing as an independent. In a shock result, Torbay won the seat with a comfortable margin—the latest case of NSW country areas rejecting the Nationals in favour of local independents.

Torbay was comfortably reelected in 2003, 2007, and 2011, each time taking well over 60 percent of the two-party vote and easily winning enough primary votes to retain the seat outright. He served as Speaker of the New South Wales Legislative Assembly from 2007 to 2011, during what proved to be the final term of Labor's 16-year run in government. He was the first independent to hold that post since 1917. As a measure of his popularity, he suffered a swing of nearly 11 percent in 2011 amid the massive Coalition wave that swept through NSW, but still retained his seat with a comfortable majority of 19.2 percent. He actually won 63 percent of the primary vote, more than enough to win another term outright.

Torbay was forced out of politics in 2013 amid a corruption investigation. At the ensuing by-election, Adam Marshall easily reclaimed the seat for the Nationals. This was not considered an upset, as Northern Tablelands had been a comfortably safe National seat in "traditional" two-party matchups with Labor for most of Torbay's tenure. The Nationals would have won it two years earlier with a majority of 26.1 percent in a "traditional" two-party matchup with Labor. Marshall held the seat without serious difficulty until his resignation in 2024, usually winning well over 60 percent of the primary vote. Even as the Coalition lost government in 2022, he retained the seat with a two-candidate majority of 33.8 percent, the safest in the state. Brendan Moylan easily retained the seat for the Nationals at the ensuing by-election.

From 1999, Northern Tablelands covered 30,546 km^{2}, including the uplands of northern New South Wales. It centred on the university city of Armidale; other towns included in the electorate are Inverell, Glen Innes, Tenterfield and Uralla. The northern boundary of the electorate is the Queensland border. At the 2003 election, there were 42,886 enrolled voters.

In 2007, the low level of population growth in the electorate led to Northern Tablelands being expanded, both to the west to take in Warialda and Bingara and to the south to take in Walcha and Nowendoc, increasing its area to 44,674 km^{2}.

The redistribution ahead of the 2015 state election saw Northern Tablelands expanded again to 53,153.76 square kilometres. Added to the district was the entirety of Moree Plains Shire along with the remainder of the former Armidale Dumaresq Shire, whilst Tenterfield Shire was removed from the district.

While Labor frequently runs dead in northern NSW, Northern Tablelands has become particularly unfriendly territory for Labor even by northern NSW standards. Labor has never come reasonably close to retaking the seat since McCarthy's death. For example, Chappell was reelected in 1995 with a primary vote large enough to win outright even as the Coalition was defeated. Since the turn of the millennium, Labor has been lucky to get more than 20 percent of the two-party vote, and has even been pushed into third place on some occasions.

== Members ==
First incarnation (1920–1927, 3 members)
Member	Party	Term	Member	Party	Term	Member	Party	Term
Michael Bruxner	Progressive	1920–1925	David Drummond	Progressive	1920–1925	Alfred McClelland	Labor	1920–1927
Michael Bruxner	Country	1925–1927	David Drummond	Country	1925–1927	Alfred McClelland	Labor	1920–1927

Second incarnation (1981–present, 1 member)
Member	Party	Term
Bill McCarthy	Labor	1981–1987
Ray Chappell	National	1987–1999
Richard Torbay	Independent	1999–2013
Adam Marshall	National	2013–2024
Brendan Moylan	National	2024–present

== Election results ==
2024 Northern Tablelands state by-election
Party	Candidate	Votes	%	±%
National	Brendan Moylan	31,203	67.9	−3.7
Shooters, Fishers, Farmers	Ben Smith	5,229	11.4	+6.9
Greens	Dorothy Robinson	4,211	9.2	+4.4
Independent	Duncan Fischer	3,292	7.2	+7.2
Independent	Natasha Ledger	1,999	4.4	+3.4
Total formal votes		45,934	97.3	−0.6
Informal votes		1,271	2.7	+0.6
Turnout		47,205	80.2	−7.4
Two-candidate-preferred result
National	Brendan Moylan	33,611	81.9	−1.9
Shooters, Fishers, Farmers	Ben Smith	7,411	18.1	+18.1
National hold		Swing	−1.9	

2023 New South Wales state election: Northern Tablelands
Party	Candidate	Votes	%	±%
National	Adam Marshall	35,575	71.6	−1.8
Labor	Yvonne Langenberg	5,045	10.2	−0.8
Greens	Elizabeth O'Hara	2,369	4.8	−0.8
Shooters, Fishers, Farmers	Michael Hay	2,239	4.5	−5.1
Legalise Cannabis	Peter O'Loghlin	1,148	2.3	+2.3
Independent	Billy Wood	980	2.0	+2.0
Liberal Democrats	Margaret Hammond	783	1.6	+1.6
Sustainable Australia	Alan Crowe	595	1.2	+1.2
Independent	Natasha Ledger	496	1.0	+1.0
Public Education	Gary Hampton	425	0.9	+0.9
Total formal votes		49,655	98.0	−0.1
Informal votes		1,039	2.0	+0.1
Turnout		50,694	87.6	−3.1
Two-party-preferred result
National	Adam Marshall	37,654	83.8	+0.7
Labor	Yvonne Langenberg	7,255	16.2	−0.7
National hold		Swing	+0.7	
