= Anna Halafoff =

Australian sociologist and academic

- Occupations: Sociologist, academic

Academic background
- Education: Monash University PhD; University of New England (Australia) (MLitt); University of Melbourne (BA)
- Thesis: Netpeace : the multifaith movement and common security (2010)
- Doctoral advisor: Gary Bouma

Academic work
- Discipline: Sociology
- Sub-discipline: Sociology of religion
- Institutions: Deakin University
- Main interests: sociology of religion, religious diversity and interfaith relations
- Website: www.deakin.edu.au/about-deakin/people/anna-halafoff

Anna Halafoff is an Australian sociologist who is associate professor in sociology at Deakin University and former president of the Australian Association for the Study of Religion.

== Education ==
Halafoff completed a Bachelor of Arts at the University of Melbourne, a Master of Letters at the University of New England in 2001, a Graduate Diploma of Education at the University of New England in 2006, and a Doctor of Philosophy at Monash University in Melbourne, Victoria in 2010.

Her doctoral dissertation, titled Netpeace : the multifaith movement and common security, examines the rise of multifaith engagement from the perspective of social movement theory and cosmopolitan theory. Her principal supervisor was Gary Bouma.

== Career ==
Halafoff is associate professor in Sociology of Religion in the School of Humanities and Social Sciences at Deakin University, in Burwood, Australia and the coordinator of the Spirituality and Wellbeing (SWell) Research Network.

She is currently leading the Australian Research Council Discovery Project on Australian Spirituality: Wellness, Well being and Risks and is a member of the International Research Network for the Study of Science & Belief in Society.

She was also a Research Associate of the UNESCO Chair in Interreligious and Intercultural Relations – Asia Pacific at Monash University and a Research Associate of the Religion and Diversity Project at the University of Ottawa.

Halafoff was a Chief Investigator on two Australian Research Council Discovery Projects on the Worldviews of Generation Z Australians and on Religious Diversity in Australia and the Chief Investigator on the International Research Network for the Study of Science & Belief in Society project on Conspirituality in Australia.

Her research interests include religious diversity, interreligious relations, religion and education, preventing violent extremism, contemporary spirituality, Buddhism and gender, and Buddhism in Australia. She has published extensively in these areas.

Halafoff's research has had an impact on government policy and curriculum development in the area of religious diversity, particularly in the state of Victoria. She is also regularly called upon to comment on her fields of expertise in the media. She is a regular guest on the Australian Broadcasting Corporation's Soul Search and God Forbid and contributor to the ABC's Religion & Ethics program, and The Conversation.

Halafoff is a practicing Buddhist and has been involved in interfaith activities and networks since the mid-1990s. In 2011, Halafoff was named a United Nations Alliance of Civilizations' Global Expert in the fields of interfaith relations and religion, conflict and peacebuilding.

She was the President of the Australian Association for the Study of Religion (AASR) in 2021–2023. In 2010 the AASR Women's Caucus selected her to give the annual Penny Magee Memorial Lecture.

Halafoff has served as the Australasian Representative on the International Society for the Sociology of Religion's Council, as Secretary of the International Sociological Associations Research Committee 22 on Religion, and as Deputy Secretary General Executive Committee member of the International Association for the History of Religions. She was elected a Fellow of the Australian Academy of the Humanities in 2024.

== Selected publications ==
=== Books ===
- Ezzy, D, Halafoff, Anna, Banham, R & Barton G (eds.) Gary 2024, Religious Diversity in Australia: Living Well with Difference, Bloomsbury, London. ISBN 9781350334441
- Singleton, Andrew, Halafoff, Anna, Rasmussen, Mary Lou and Bouma, Gary 2021, Freedoms, faiths and futures: Teenage Australians on religion, sexuality and diversity, First ed., Bloomsbury Academic, London. ISBN 9781350179561
- Clarke, Matthew and Halafoff, Anna 2017, Religion and development in the Asia-Pacific : sacred places as development spaces, Routledge, London. ISBN 9781138792364
- Halafoff, Anna, Elisabeth Arweck, and Donald L. Boisvert. 2016. Education about religions and worldviews: promoting intercultural and interreligious understanding in secular societies. Routledge, London. ISBN 9781138683600
- Halafoff, Anna 2013, The multifaith movement : global risks and cosmopolitan solutions, Springer, Dordrecht, Netherlands. ISBN 9789400752092

=== Book chapters ===
- Halafoff, Anna 2019, InterAction Australia: Countering the Politics of Fear with Netpeace. In John Fahy, and Jan-Jonathan Bock eds., The interfaith movement: Mobilising religious diversity in the 21st century, Routledge, London. pp. 68–86. ISBN 9781138606302
- Halafoff, Anna 2018. Interfaith Youth in Australia: A Critical Reflection on Religious Diversity, Literacy and Identity. In Lene Kuhle, Jorn Borup and William Hoverd eds., A Critical Analysis of Religious Diversity, Brill. pp. 230–251. ISBN 978-90-04-36709-8
- Halafoff, Anna and Laura Gobey (2018) '"Whatever"? Religion, Youth, and Identity in 21st Century Australia.' In Peter Beyer, Spencer Bulllivant and Paul Gareau eds., Youth, Religion and Identity in a Globalizing Context. Leiden: Brill. pp. 255–277. ISBN 978-90-04-44710-3

=== Journal articles ===
- Halafoff, Anna; Singleton, A; Fitzpatrick, R (2023). "Spiritual Complexity in Australia: Wellbeing and Risks". Social Compass. 70 (2): 243–262. doi:10.1177/00377686231162005.
- Halafoff, Anna; Lam, L; Rocha, C; Weng, Enqi; Smith, S (2022). "Buddhism in the Far North of Australia pre-WWII: (In)visibility, post-colonialism and lived religion". Journal of Global Buddhism. 23 (2): 105–28. doi:10.26034/lu.jgb.2022.1995.
- Halafoff, Anna; Marriott, Emily; Smith, Geraldine; Weng, Enqi; Bouma, Gary (2021). "Worldviews Complexity in COVID-19 Times: Australian Media Representations of Religion, Spirituality and Non-Religion in 2020". Religions. 12 (9): 682. doi:10.3390/rel12090682. hdl:10536/DRO/DU:30155022.
- Weng, Enqi; Halafoff, Anna (2020). "Media Representations of Religion, Spirituality and Non-Religion in Australia". Religions. 11 (7): 332. doi:10.3390/rel11070332. hdl:10536/DRO/DU:30139775.
- Halafoff, Anna; Shipley, Heather; Young, Pamela D.; Singleton, Andrew; Rasmussen, Mary Lou; Bouma, Gary (2020). "Complex, Critical and Caring: Young People's Diverse Religious, Spiritual and Non-Religious Worldviews in Australia and Canada". Religions. 11 (4): 166. doi:10.3390/rel11040166. hdl:1885/216161.
- Halafoff, Anna; Singleton, Andrew; Bouma, Gary; Rasmussen, Mary Lou (2 April 2020). "Religious literacy of Australia's Gen Z teens: diversity and social inclusion". Journal of Beliefs & Values. 41 (2): 195–213. doi:10.1080/13617672.2019.1698862. hdl:1885/231432. ISSN 1361-7672. S2CID 213984265.
