= Pat O'Shane =

Australian judge (born 1941)

Pat O'Shane AM
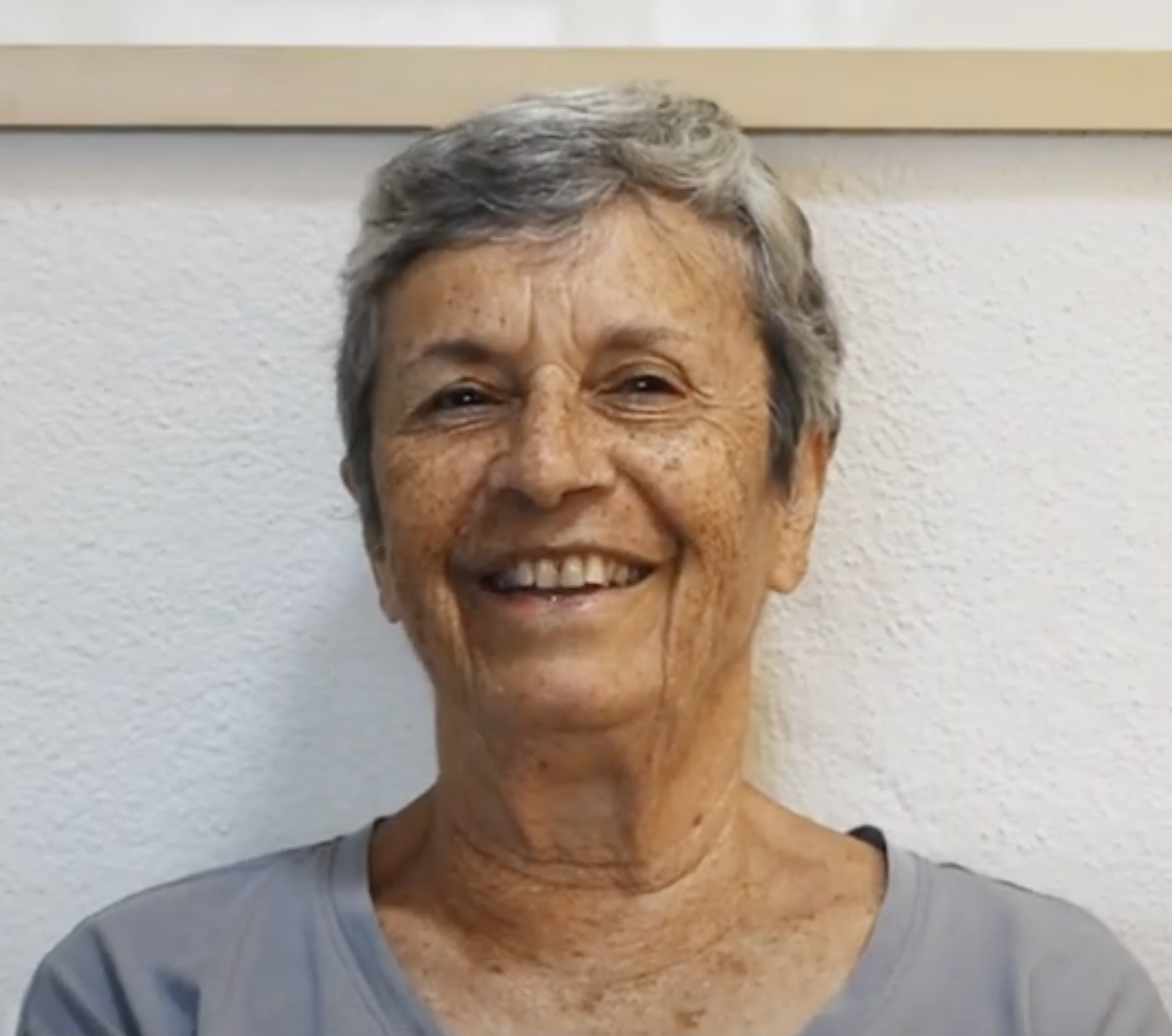
- O'Shane in 2022

Chancellor of the University of New England
- In office 1994–2003
- Preceded by: Rob Robertson-Cuninghame
- Succeeded by: John Cassidy

Personal details
- Born: Patricia June O'Shane; 1941 (age 84–85) Mossman, Queensland, Australia
- Party: Socialist Alliance
- Education: University of Queensland; University of New South Wales
- Profession: Teacher; Barrister; Public Servant; Jurist

Patricia June O'Shane AM (born 1941) is a retired Australian teacher, barrister, public servant, jurist, and Aboriginal activist. She was Australia's first Aboriginal magistrate, serving the Local Court in Sydney, New South Wales, between 1986 until her retirement in 2013.

O'Shane was the first female Aboriginal teacher in Queensland; the first Aboriginal to earn a law degree; the first Aboriginal barrister; and the first woman and Aboriginal person to be the head of a government department in Australia, the New South Wales Ministry of Aboriginal Affairs.

== Early life and education ==
Patricia June O'Shane was born in Queensland in 1941 to Gladys, an Aboriginal woman, and her husband Patrick 'Tiger' O'Shane, an Irish boxer and unionist. She is an Aboriginal Australian of the Kunjandji clan of the Kuku Yalanji people. O'Shane's mother moved the family from Mossman to Cairns to enable her children to receive a good education. O'Shane ended up the only Aboriginal Australian child in her age group graduating from her high school, gained a scholarship and studied at Kelvin Grove Teachers' College (now Queensland University of Technology) and the University of Queensland, before teaching at Cairns High School for eight years. When her mother died O'Shane went into a deep depression and was hospitalised.

On an Aboriginal Study Grant, O'Shane studied law at the University of New South Wales, graduated in 1976, and was admitted to the New South Wales bar.

== Career ==
O'Shane began practising law as a barrister with the Aboriginal Legal Service in Sydney and then in Central Australia. O'Shane was head of the New South Wales Ministry of Aboriginal Affairs from 1981 to 1986, before her appointment as a magistrate. She was the Chancellor of the University of New England between 1994 and 2003.

O'Shane was elected to the Australian Constitutional Convention 1998, which considered the issue of Australia becoming a republic. She advocated strongly for an Australian republic. In her opening address, she expressed a want for modification based on what she perceived as historical injustice and inadequacies within the Australian Constitution:

That modern Australia, the Australia that has developed since 26 January 1788 as distinct from the Australia of my ancestors, has a constitutional monarchy is a direct unambiguous consequence of our origins as a colony of Britain – a penal colony at that. As such, it was underwritten with the values of power, privilege, elitism, oppression and dispossession. It was blatantly exclusionary. It is no wonder then that the Australian Constitution, designed to institute a constitutional monarchy as the system of government in this country, is such an inadequate and uncertain instrument as it is.

Her decisions and behavior in court were sometimes controversial. A study in 2012 by Michael Eburn and Ruth Townsend of the Australian National University College of Law examined 56 Supreme Court appeals of cases heard before O'Shane between 1999 and 2012. Of the 56 appeals, 35 (62.5%) were upheld. Of the 16 criminal cases included, 14 appeals were upheld. Eburn and Townsend wrote: "The Supreme Court has found that O'Shane had got the law wrong in 14 out of the 16 criminal cases... In one case she dismissed a charge even though the accused had entered a plea of guilty". Supreme Court judges criticised O'Shane for "denying the prosecution procedural fairness," and "failure to comprehend the basis of the prosecution case or the evidence before her, use of intemperate language and making numerous errors of law." Eburn and Townsend compared the records of two other magistrates with similar experience and found only eight and nine appeals against them respectively. They called for O'Shane's resignation.

In 2013 O'Shane was awarded a Deadly Award for lifetime achievement in leadership, being praised as a woman who "blazed a path for others to follow... she is a genuine and inspiring role model for others". Along with fellow Deadly 2013 winner Archie Roach, she used the win to call for an end to the Northern Territory Intervention.

=== Firsts ===
O'Shane was the first female Aboriginal teacher in Queensland; the first Aboriginal to earn a law degree; the first Aboriginal barrister; and the first woman and Aboriginal person to be the head of a government department in Australia, the New South Wales Ministry of Aboriginal Affairs.

== After retirement ==
O'Shane retired as a magistrate in January 2013, taking long service leave until she reached compulsory retirement age in mid-June.

O'Shane ran in the electorate of Leichhardt in North Queensland in the 2022 Australian federal election as a candidate for Socialist Alliance. O'Shane polled over four percent of the vote, the best performance for a Socialist Alliance candidate at that election, and polled strongly in a number of remote communities on the Cape York Peninsula and the Torres Strait. Electoral analyst Kevin Bonham stated that the comparatively strong performance for Socialist Alliance in Leichhardt was likely due to O'Shane's personal profile and credibility.

== Awards and honours ==
- 1984: Order of Australia, for public service in the field of Aboriginal welfare
- 1998: Voted one of Australia's living treasures by the National Trust
- 2001: Centenary Medal, for service to Australian society and higher education
- 2001: Victorian Honour Roll of Women
- 2013: Deadly Awards 2013, Marcia Langton Award For Lifetime Achievement in Leadership
- 2021: NAIDOC Awards, Lifetime Achievement Award

== Personal life ==
O'Shane married to Aboriginal activist and statesman Mick Miller on 5 May 1962 at St Monica's Catholic Cathedral in Cairns, and together they had two daughters, Lydia Caroline and Marilyn Rose Miller. Their marriage was dissolved in 1977, after several years of separation.

Lydia was a co-founder of the Aboriginal National Theatre Trust, along with her friend and frequent collaborator, actor and director Rhoda Roberts. She was later executive director of Aboriginal and Torres Strait Islander Arts at the Australia Council. Marilyn is a dancer and choreographer who trained at NAISDA, danced with Bangarra until 1998, formed Fresh Dancers, and was chair of the NSW Ministry of the Arts dance committee for three years before moving back to Brisbane to become artistic director of Kooemba Jdarra Indigenous Performing Arts.

She is the aunt of burn survivor Tjandamurra O'Shane, who survived being set on fire with petrol as a young child in 1996.

Academic offices
Preceded by Rob Robertson-Cuninghame	Chancellor of the University of New England; 1994–2003	Succeeded by John Cassidy
