= Tjandamurra O'Shane =

Australian crime victim (born 1990)

- Born: 15 August 1990 (age 36); Australia
- Other name: Janda
- Children: 2
- Parent(s): Tim O'Shane; Jenni Patterson

Tjandamurra (Jandamarra) "Janda" O'Shane (born 15 August 1990) is an Aboriginal Australian man who at age six was the victim of a fire attack whilst playing at a schoolyard in Cairns, Queensland on 10 October 1996. The attack, and O'Shane's struggle to survive, captivated the Australian nation, as millions followed his plight in the Australian media.

== Background ==
Tjandamurra O'Shane was born on 15 August 1990, and known as "Janda". His given name comes from the Aboriginal resistance fighter Tjandamurra, and is sometimes transliterated as "Jandamarra". He is the nephew of New South Wales magistrate Pat O'Shane, and former Aboriginal and Torres Strait Islander Commissioner Terry O'Shane.

== The attack ==
The perpetrator, Paul Wade Streeton, arrived at the school carrying a 5-litre can of petrol, and attacked O'Shane, who was one of a group of children out in the playground. Streeton drenched O'Shane in fuel, and set him alight with a cigarette lighter. O'Shane ran through the school yard with his body in flames. Hearing O'Shane's screams, school principal Michael Aitken rushed out of his office and smothered the flames with his shirt and hands.

With burns to 70 percent of his body, O'Shane was not expected to live. He required long periods recovering at the Royal Children's Hospital in Brisbane, and years of skin grafts. As most of his sweat glands were destroyed by the fire he can only sweat through his face and hands, making it difficult to play sport.

== Aftermath ==
O'Shane became a national figure in Australia, as the country sympathised and followed his progress. The attack received publicity around the world.

Streeton was arrested and later convicted for the attack. He was sentenced to life in jail. O'Shane and his mother Jenni Patterson said in 2008 that they had forgiven Streeton.

Pat O'Shane described Streeton's sentence as "too harsh".

=== Support ===
In 1996, boxer Lionel Rose presented O'Shane with his World Title belt, hoping to speed the youngster's recovery.

Fundraising activities took place around Australia. The current affairs program Witness, on the Seven Network, set up an appeal, and was inundated with money, chocolates, teddy bears, and other toys for O'Shane. The program raised in excess of $120,000, and money kept coming during following years. Australian rock band Midnight Oil played a charity concert in Cairns, Queensland in 1997, to raise money for O'Shane's recovery.

In June 1999, at the age of eight, O'Shane was awarded A$75,000 in criminal compensation in the Supreme Court of Queensland. New South Wales Attorney-General Jeff Shaw, used the case to highlight inequities in the compensation laws, pointing out other cases where no physical harm was done, but much larger sums of money were issued.

Graham Richardson of the Sydney Organising Committee for the Olympic Games, gave O'Shane a position on the Torch Relay of the 2000 Summer Olympics. As he was three years below the minimum age to carry the flame, O'Shane ran with his mother.

== Personal life ==
In an interview given to The Courier Mail in 2008 to mark his 18th birthday, O'Shane said he was bemused by the enormous amount of national attention he had received in Australia.

In 2008 O'Shane graduated from Woree State High School after completing Year 12. He and his partner have a son and a daughter.
