= Gary Bouma =

American-Australian sociologist (1942–2021)

Gary Bouma AM
- Born: 21 February 1942; Grand Rapids, Michigan, United States
- Died: 19 August 2021 (aged 79); Melbourne, Victoria, Australia
- Citizenship: United States, Australia
- Occupations: Sociologist, Anglican priest

Academic background
- Education: Calvin University (BA); Princeton Theological Seminary (BD); Cornell University (MA, PhD)
- Thesis: Is there a religious factor? (1970)

Academic work
- Discipline: Sociology
- Sub-discipline: Sociology of religion
- Institutions: Monash University

Gary Donald Bouma AM (21 February 1942 – 19 August 2021) was an author and a professor of sociology at Monash University in Melbourne, Victoria. He was born in Grand Rapids, Michigan and was a citizen of both the United States and Australia.

His primary research interests were related to the topics of multiculturalism and religious pluralism. He was also a priest in the Anglican Church. Bouma worked to promote communication and respect between religious communities. He commenced with Monash University in 1979 and served in leadership roles in the World Conference of Religions for Peace and the Christian Research Association. In an interview in 2004 he said:

The situation in the Middle East won’t be resolved until there is a religious solution. And groups like Al Qaeda, which are puritanical Muslims with a religious agenda, will continue their efforts until stopped by those Muslims who disagree with the aims of Al Qaeda, just like Cromwell in England.

Bouma was the UNESCO Chair in Intercultural and Interreligious Relations – Asia Pacific, Emeritus Professor of Sociology at Monash University, the Australian node of the Religion and Diversity Project at the University of Ottawa, Director of the Global Terrorism Research Centre, and Associate Priest in the Anglican Parish of St John's East Malvern. He was Past-President of the Australian Association for the Study of Religions. He was Chair, Board of Directors for The Parliament of the World's Religions 2009. His research in the sociology of religion examined the management of religious diversity in plural multicultural societies, education about religions, postmodernity as a context for doing theology, religion and terror, religion and public policy. He is the author or co-author of over 30 books and 360 articles.

In 2013 Bouma was invested as a Member of the Order of Australia (AM) for services to sociology, to interreligious relations and to the Anglican Church of Australia.

Bouma devoted much energy to supporting moves to establish social justice and increase social cohesion through efforts to include diverse groups across divides. This includes early work in the civil rights movement, support for women's liberation and abortion reform, and has been a champion for marriage equality and greater acceptance of and respect for LGBTIQ people. Most notably he worked to reduce the barriers between religious groups through interactions designed to increase understanding and mutual respect.

Bouma died on 19 August 2021, aged 79.

== Publications ==
- Bouma, Gary D. (1984). How the saints persevere : social factors in the vitality of the Christian Reformed Church. Clayton, Victoria, Australia: Dept. of Anthropology and Sociology, Monash University. ISBN 0867463104.
- Dixon, Beverly R.; Bouma, Gary D. (1986). The religious factor in Australian life. Melbourne: MARK Australia, World Vision in association with the ZADOK Centre for Christianity and Society. ISBN 0959691561.
- Bouma, G.D. (1992). Religion : meaning, transcendence, and community in Australia. Melbourne, Australia: Longman Cheshire. ISBN 0582870119.
- Atkinson, G.B.J.; Bouma, Gary D. (1995). A handbook of social science research (2nd ed.). Oxford: Oxford University Press. ISBN 0198280017.
- Bouma, Gary D. (2000). The research process (4th ed.). Melbourne: Oxford University Press. ISBN 0195512243.
- Khatab, Sayed; Bouma, Gary D. (2007). Democracy in Islam. New York, NY: Routledge. ISBN 978-0415425742.
- Pratt, Douglas; Bouma, Gary D.; Ling, Rod (2010). Religious diversity in Southeast Asia and the Pacific : national case studies. Dordrecht [The Netherlands]: Springer. ISBN 978-9048133888.
