= Julienne Kaman =

Papua New Guinea academic

Julienne Kaman, from Papua New Guinea (PNG), is Pro-Chancellor of the University of Goroka in PNG's Highlands Region.

== Education ==
Julienne Kaman obtained a PhD in peace studies from the University of New England at Armidale, New South Wales, Australia. Her thesis was titled: A Search for Peace and Justice in Papua New Guinea: Can the study of peace make a difference?

== Career ==
Kaman, who is a trained teacher, has taught in secondary schools, at the University of Goroka, at the Institute of Distance and Continuing Education of the University of Papua New Guinea (UPNG) in Port Moresby, where she lectured in social sciences, and at the Divine Word University in Madang. She has also worked for the Ministry of Education in Nauru. She has collaborated with civil-society groups on development and peace issues. Her writings have emphasised injustice and underdevelopment. She was a co-founder of the lobby group, the Melanesian Peoples Forum. Prior to being appointed as Pro-Chancellor of the University of Goroka, Kaman was a member of the University of Goroka Council.

Kaman was present when police entered the UPNG campus in 2001 and shot and killed two students and two outsiders, following protests about proposed land legislation. As word of the killings spread, people marched towards the campus from different parts of town defying police efforts to block them. Kaman described this as a "spontaneous people's movement". She was implicated by the media as having been involved in inciting the student demonstration, a fact that she denied, giving a detailed rebuttal to the Commission of Inquiry organized to review the event.

== Publications ==
Kaman's publications include:

- Kaman, Julienne. 1999. No development without peace: Rethinking development in Papua New Guinea: A conceptual framework. In Development Studies Network Research School of Social Sciences, Australian National University. No. 50. October 1999.
- Kaman, Julienne. 2003. Peace studies as a process of peace building: an alternative approach to violence in PNG, 25 years and beyond. In Charles Yala; David Kavanamur; Quinton Clements, Building a nation in Papua New Guinea: views of the post-Independence generation. Pandanus Books. Canberra.
- Kaman, Julienne. 2003. Privatization of Water in Papua New Guinea - "Eda Ranu". Presented at the Civil Society Consultation of the 2003 Commonwealth Finance Ministers Meeting on Provision of Basic Services, Bandar Seri Begawan, Negara Brunei Darussalam, July 22–24, 2003.
- Kaman, Julienne. 2010. Peace Education for Bougainville. Contemporary PNG Studies: Vol. 12 May 2010.
