= Brendan Moylan =

Australian politician

Brendan Moylan MP
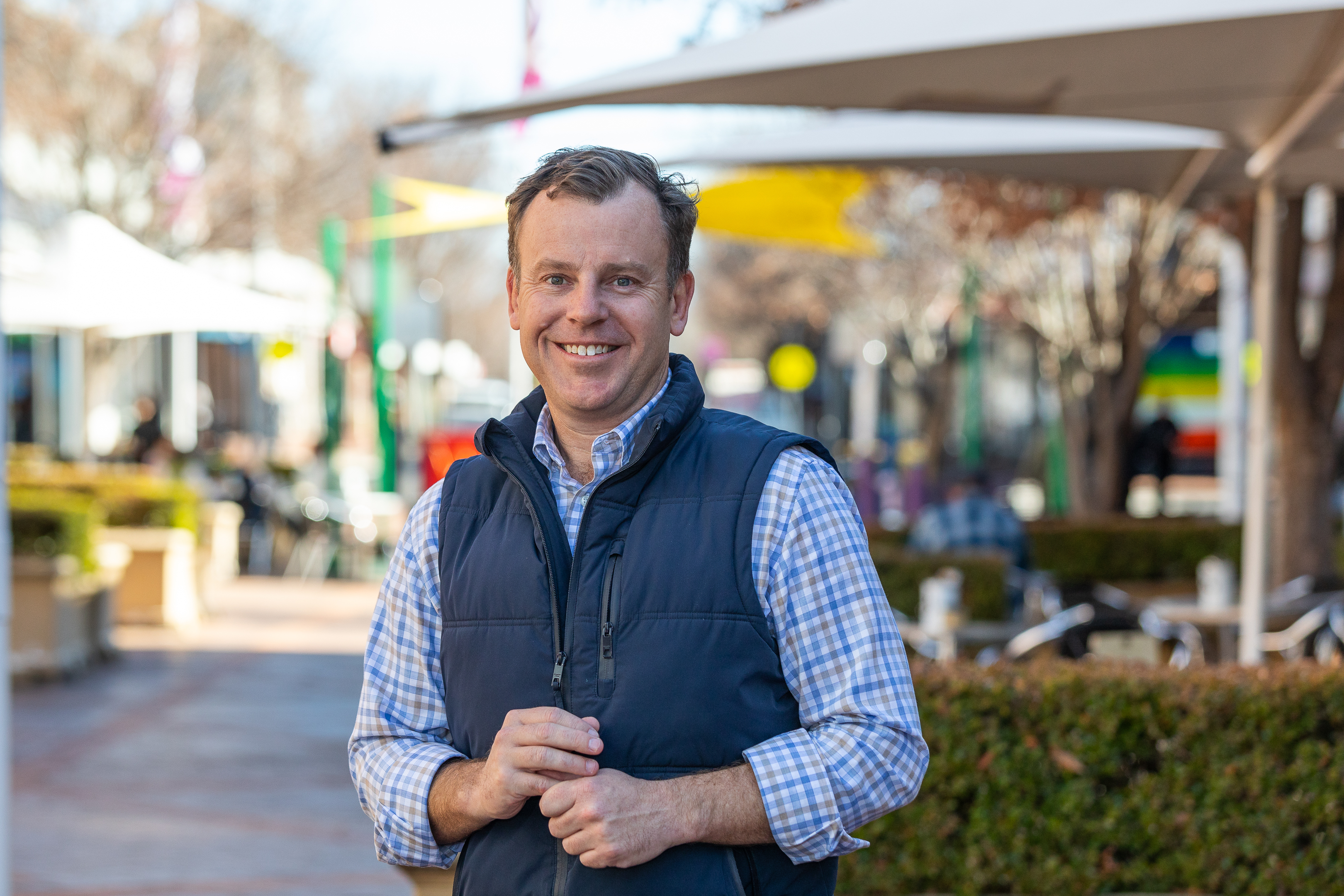

Member of the New South Wales Legislative Assembly for Northern Tablelands
- Incumbent
- Assumed office 22 June 2024
- Preceded by: Adam Marshall

Personal details
- Party: National
- Education: University of New England
- Profession: Solicitor

Brendan Moylan is an Australian solicitor and politician who has represented Northern Tablelands in the New South Wales Legislative Assembly since a 2024 by-election, as a member of The Nationals.

== Early life and education ==
Moylan grew up on his family's wheat and cattle farm in the Emerald Hill district, outside of Gunnedah NSW, his parents were farmers, and his mother Deidre also worked as a Registered Nurse in Gunnedah.

Moylan attended St Xavier's School in Gunnedah for his primary schooling and then boarded at St Joseph's College Hunters Hill (Joeys) for the duration of his secondary schooling.

In 1999 Moylan commenced a combined Arts/Law Degree at the University of New England, and resided on campus at St Alberts College (Albies). Moylan represented Albies in the 1st XV side and the zone New England 1st XV at Country week. Moylan was also an academic tutor during his years at Albies. Whilst studying Moylan worked behind the bar and as a glassie at the New England Hotel in Armidale together with working on farms in the Armidale district during term and on farms in the Mungindi district during term breaks.

Upon the completion of his degree Moylan moved to Moree and commenced working at the law firm Webb and Boland in December 2003, he became partner in 2007 and remained at Webb and Boland until entering politics in 2024. Whilst Moylan worked as a solicitor his practice was predominately focused on Land and Environment Court work.

Moylan is married with 3 children.

== Political career ==
On 13 May 2024, Adam Marshall resigned from his seat of Northern Tablelands, thus triggering a by-election. Moylan was selected by the NSW Nationals as their main candidate for the electoral district. On the day of the by-election, he came in first place, with 17,843 votes.

New South Wales Legislative Assembly
Preceded by Adam Marshall	Member for Northern Tablelands; 2024–present	Incumbent
