= John Cassidy (chancellor) =

John Cassidy AO

6th Chancellor of the University of New England
- In office 2004–2008
- Preceded by: Pat O'Shane
- Succeeded by: Richard Torbay

Personal details
- Education: University of Newcastle
- Profession: Civil engineer

John Marcus Cassidy AO, an Australian engineer and pastoralist, was the sixth Chancellor of the University of New England, serving from 2004 until 2008.

== Biography ==
Much of Cassidy’s career was in civil engineering. He studied at the University of Newcastle, where he graduated with a Bachelor of Engineering (Civil). His career included stints abroad between 1975 and 1985. In the late 1980s, Cassidy became CEO of the construction company Abigroup. Having built and diversified the company, Cassidy retired as CEO of Abigroup in early 2004. In 1982, Cassidy purchased the grazing property Merilba at Kingstown, where he became associated with the breeding of South Devon cattle, as well as other livestock, and more recent times, the growing wine grapes on the property.

Cassidy was appointed chancellor by the University Council on 11 December 2003, and was installed at a graduation ceremony the following March. In 2007, Cassidy was made an Officer of the Order of Australia for service to university administration, to the civil engineering and construction industries, and to the community. He also became involved with other educational institutions, including the New England Conservatorium of Music and the New England Girls School, where in 2006 he underwrote the school’s A$ 4 million debt.

In 2008, Cassidy became embroiled in a dispute with the university vice-chancellor, Alan Pettigrew over the demarcation of roles between the two offices. In June 2008, the staff passed motions of no confidence in the chancellor. Despite attempts at mediation by Sir Laurence Street, on 10 November 2008, it was announced that Cassidy's appointment as chancellor would not be renewed for a second term, and he was replaced by Richard Torbay.

Academic offices
Preceded by Pat O'Shane	Chancellor of the University of New England; 2004 - 2008	Succeeded by Richard Torbay
