= Frank Kitto =

Australian judge

The Right Honourable Sir Frank Kitto AC, KBE, QC
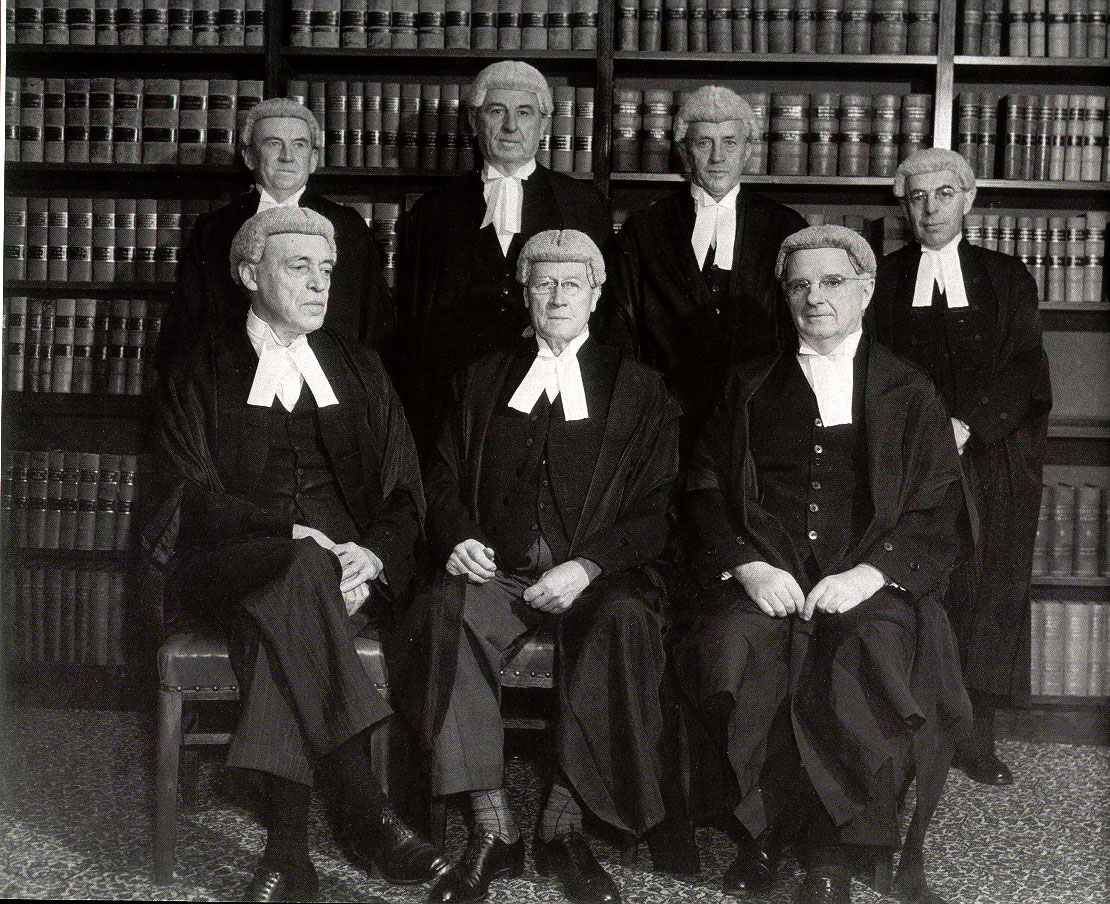
- High Court in 1952, Kitto far right, back row

Justice of the High Court of Australia
- In office 10 May 1950 – 1 August 1970
- Nominated by: Robert Menzies
- Preceded by: Sir George Rich
- Succeeded by: Sir Harry Gibbs

Personal details
- Born: 30 July 1903 Melbourne, Victoria, Australia
- Died: 15 February 1994 (aged 90) Armidale, New South Wales, Australia

Sir Frank Walters Kitto (30 July 1903 – 15 February 1994), Australian judge, was a Justice of the High Court of Australia.

== Early life and education ==
Kitto was born in Melbourne in 1903, but his family moved to Sydney, when his father, James Kitto, became the Deputy Director of Posts and Telegraphs in New South Wales. There, he was educated at North Sydney Boys' High School. He later studied at the University of Sydney, where he graduated with a Bachelor of Arts (1924) and a Bachelor of Laws (1927) with first class honours, while also winning the Pitt Cobbett Prize for constitutional law in 1924.

== Career ==
From 1921 to 1927, Kitto worked for the Solicitor-General of New South Wales, and after this time he was admitted to the New South Wales Bar, where he practised as a barrister. His specialities were equity and Australian constitutional law. From 1930 to 1933 he was a lecturer at the University of Sydney, teaching bankruptcy and probate law in the Sydney law school. In 1932, while still a junior counsel, he appeared for the Government of New South Wales in Trethowan's case, which concerned Premier Jack Lang's attempt to abolish the New South Wales Legislative Council. The case was argued through the Supreme Court of New South Wales, the High Court and then finally to the Judicial Committee of the Privy Council.

As a lawyer, Kitto often argued both alongside and against Garfield Barwick, then a King's Counsel and later Chief Justice of Australia. In the banks nationalisation case, Kitto and Barwick argued for the banks, in another case which went to the Privy Council. Kitto's work in defeating the Chifley government's attempt to nationalise the banks was rewarded by the opposing Menzies government two years later by an appointment to the bench of the High Court on 10 May 1950. Kitto was the first person appointed to the Court who had been born after Federation. At his swearing in, Kitto remarked:

"[Australia's] future will be influenced in no small degree by the quality of the work we do in upholding the rule of law and proving its worth and effectiveness in the development of a nation in whose righteousness must lie its greatness."

Kitto had a complicated writing style, but his judgments were generally highly regarded for being well founded in legal principle. William Andrew Noye Wells, a former Justice of the Supreme Court of South Australia, suggests Kitto's High Court decisions are illustrative of literature within the law at its best, both in content and expression. Michael Kirby considers that Kitto's judgment in the Communist Party case, delivered less than a year after his appointment to the court, remains one of his finest, primarily because of his unwavering support for the rule of law and for the Constitution.

In 1963, Kitto was appointed to the Privy Council. Kitto resigned from the High Court on 1 August 1970, and was subsequently appointed Chancellor of the University of New England, having been Deputy Chancellor since 1968. He continued as Chancellor until 1981. Kitto also served as the inaugural Chairman of the Australian Press Council from 1976 to 1982. In 1982, Kitto was awarded an honorary Doctorate of Laws from the University of Sydney and an honorary Doctorate of Letters from the University of New England.

== Personal life ==
In 1927, Kitto married Eleanor May Howard and subsequently they had four daughters, Kathleen, Margaret, Lindsay (Lyn) and Elizabeth (Liz).

He died in 1994, in Armidale, New South Wales, at the age of 90.

The Kitto family is of Cornish origin; the meaning of the name is "Christopher's (Kit's) children".

== Honours ==
In 1983, Kitto was made a Companion of the Order of Australia, having previously been knighted as a Knight Commander of the Order of the British Empire in 1955.

An annual lecture at the University of New England is named after Kitto.

Academic offices
Preceded by Phillip Wright	Chancellor of the University of New England; 1970-1981	Succeeded by Rob Robertson-Cuninghame
