= Ray Chappell =

Australian politician

NSW Minister for Small Business NSW Minister for Regional Development
- In office 26 May 1993 – 4 April 1995
- Premier: John Fahey
- Preceded by: New title
- Succeeded by: Carl Scully

Member of the New South Wales Legislative Assembly for Northern Tablelands
- In office 23 May 1987 – 5 March 1999
- Preceded by: Bill McCarthy
- Succeeded by: Richard Torbay

Personal details
- Born: 11 September 1942 (age 83) Melbourne, Victoria
- Party: National

Raymond Francis Chappell (born 11 September 1942) is a former Australian politician. He was the National Party member for Northern Tablelands in the New South Wales Parliament from 1987 to 1999, and served as a minister from 1993 to 1995.

Chappell was born in Melbourne, Victoria, the son of Eric and Phyllis Chappell. He was educated in Armidale in New South Wales at De La Salle College, receiving his Leaving Certificate in 1959. He went on to technical college, and was an administration clerk at the University of New England from 1960. On 1 February 1964 he married Annette Mary Napier, with whom he would have five children.

In 1968, Chappell was elected to Armidale City Council, where he served until 1983. He left the university in 1977 to open a small retail business. During this period he became active in the National Party, holding positions on the state and federal electorate councils. In 1987 he was preselected as the National candidate for the local state seat of Northern Tablelands after the local member, Labor's Bill McCarthy, had died. Labor endorsed McCarthy's widow Thelma to contest the by-election, and in a tightly fought campaign Chappell emerged the victor with a small 2.5% margin.

A subsequent redistribution made Northern Tablelands notionally a National seat. He was comfortably reelected at the 1988 state election amid that year's decisive Coalition victory, actually winning enough primary votes to retain the seat without the need for preferences. He was reelected almost as easily in 1991. In 1993 he was appointed Minister for Small Business and Regional Development, but he lost that position when Labor won office in 1995. In 1999, he was challenged for his seat by Richard Torbay, a popular former mayor of Armidale who was running as an independent. In a surprise result, Torbay defeated Chappell convincingly. Chappell lost 18 percent of his primary vote from 1995, taking 34.09% to Torbay's 44.15%. Ultimately, Torbay won with a two-party-preferred margin of 59.37%. After his defeat Chappell retired from politics.

New South Wales Legislative Assembly
Preceded by Bill McCarthy	Member for Northern Tablelands; 1987–1999	Succeeded by Richard Torbay
Political offices
Vacant Title last held by Gerry Peacocke as Minister for Business and Consumer Affairs	Minister for Small Business; 1993–1995	Succeeded by Carl Scully as Minister for Small Business and Regional Development
New title	Minister for Regional Development; 1993–1995	Succeeded by Carl Scully as Minister for Small Business and Regional Development
