= Richard Torbay =

Australian politician

The Honourable Richard Torbay
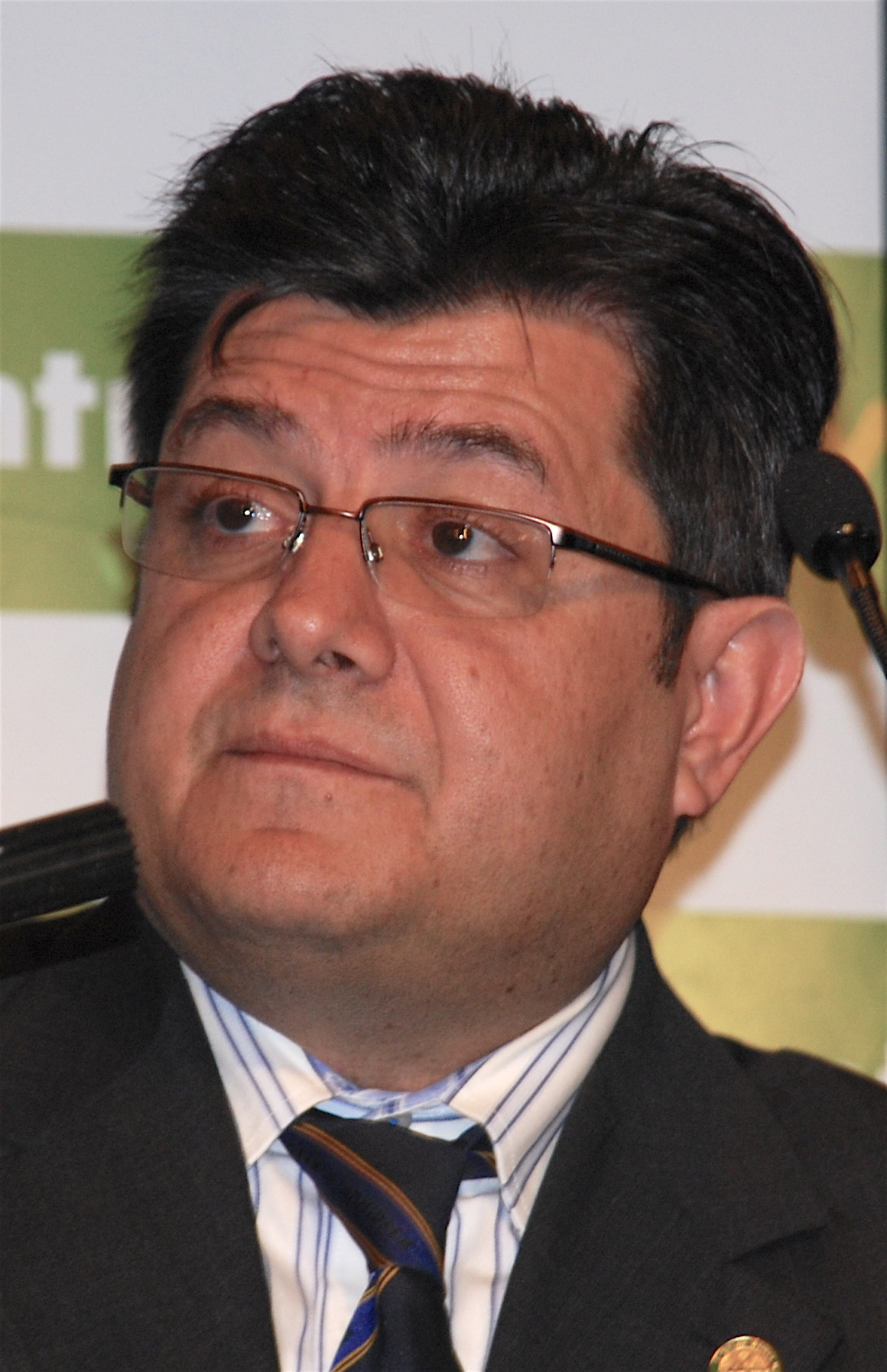

Member of the New South Wales Parliament for Northern Tablelands
- In office 27 March 1999 – 20 March 2013
- Preceded by: Ray Chappell
- Succeeded by: Adam Marshall

29th Speaker of the New South Wales Legislative Assembly
- In office 8 May 2007 – 2 May 2011
- Premier: Morris Iemma; Nathan Rees; Kristina Keneally
- Preceded by: John Aquilina
- Succeeded by: Shelley Hancock

Personal details
- Born: 26 March 1961 (age 65) Belmore, New South Wales, Australia
- Party: Independent (state); National (federal, 2012–2013)
- Occupation: Politician
- Website: NSW Parliament profile

George Richard Torbay (born 26 March 1961) is a former Australian politician who was an independent member of the New South Wales Legislative Assembly representing Northern Tablelands from 1999 to 2013. Torbay was the 30th Speaker of the New South Wales Legislative Assembly, serving from 2007 until 2011, and was the first independent member to be Speaker of the House since 1913. Prior to his election to state parliament, he served as Mayor of Armidale City Council from 1995 to 1998.

== Early life and career ==
Born in 1961, Torbay was educated at Kingswood High School. He was elected to Armidale City Council in 1991 and was a Councillor 1991–1998. He was the Deputy Mayor 1992–1993, and Mayor 1995–1998. He also established Armidale City Council: Public Relations Committee in 1993 and Youth Council in 1993.

His involvement in local government also extended to being Chairman New England Local Government Group 1997–1998; Chairman NSW Country Mayor's Association 1997–1998 and Member Water Supply and Resources Committee of the Local Government and Shires Association 1996.

He is married with three children.

== State political career ==
In 1999, he challenged the former Nationals Minister, Ray Chappell, for the seat of Northern Tablelands, running as an independent candidate. In a surprise result, Torbay defeated Chappell, winning 44.15 per cent of the primary vote to Chappell's 34.09 per cent. He was elected in Labor preferences with a two-party preferred margin of 59.37 per cent. This continued a longstanding trend of country voters in NSW rejecting the Nationals in favour of locally based independents.

Torbay was comfortably re-elected at the 2003 and 2007 general elections, each time taking over 70 percent of the primary and over 80 percent of the two-party vote.

On the first sitting day after the 2007 election Torbay accepted an offer by Premier Morris Iemma to become Speaker of the New South Wales Legislative Assembly, a position usually filled by a member of the governing party.

Following the election of the O'Farrell–Stoner Liberal/National coalition government at the 2011 general election, Torbay was replaced as Speaker by the Liberals' Shelley Hancock. At that election, even though he suffered a swing of over 10 percent against him, amid the massive Coalition wave that swept through the state, he managed to easily retain his seat with a comfortable two-party majority of 19.2 percent. He actually won 63 percent of the primary vote, enough to retain the seat outright.

In August 2012, Torbay was pre-selected as the National Party candidate for the federal seat of New England for the 2013 election, challenging former fellow state independent and current sitting member Tony Windsor. However, he continued to sit as an independent in the state parliament, and did not join the NSW Nationals party room. Polls consistently showed Torbay well-positioned to reclaim the seat that had been in National hands for 79 years before Windsor won it in 2001. Indeed, most calculations of "traditional" two-party matchups between the Nationals and Labor during Windsor's tenure had shown New England as a comfortably safe Nationals seat.

However, on 19 March 2013, in a surprise move, the Nationals forced Torbay to stand down as the party's candidate in New England and resign his party membership. Later that night, the Nationals referred information about him to the NSW Independent Commission Against Corruption. The following morning Torbay also resigned his seat in State Parliament.

It later emerged that the Nationals had received word that Torbay had received illicit donations from Labor interests to run against National Party candidates in Northern Tablelands. They were also alarmed by his ties to Labor power-broker Eddie Obeid, who at the time was the target of the biggest corruption investigation in NSW history. Reportedly, Torbay also faced questions surrounding his ownership of 20 Centrelink buildings dating back to John Howard's tenure as prime minister.

== Other appointments ==
In 1991, Torbay was the Chief Executive of the University of New England Union having previously started at the university as a kitchen hand in 1980. In 2008, he was elected the Chancellor of the University of New England. In 2007, Torbay received an honorary doctorate from the University of New England.

Civic offices
Preceded by Joe Harrold	Mayor of Armidale; 1996–2000	Merged into Armidale; Dumaresq Council
Parliament of New South Wales
Preceded by Ray Chappell	Member for Northern Tablelands; 1999–2013	Succeeded by Adam Marshall
Preceded by John Aquilina	Speaker of the New South Wales Legislative Assembly; 2007–2011	Succeeded by Shelley Hancock
Academic offices
Preceded by John Cassidy	Chancellor of the University of New England; 2008–2013	Succeeded by John Watkins
