= Running dead =

In Australian politics, running dead refers to a political party contesting an election and appearing on the ballot paper in a specific seat, but the candidate and the party not actively campaigning. This can be done with the aim for the candidate to finish third, which means their voters' preferences will likely determine the final result.

== History ==
=== Labor in Northern Sydney ===
In Northern Sydney, the Labor Party often runs dead as the region has historically been considered dominant for the Liberal Party. This includes the New South Wales Legislative Assembly seats of Davidson, Ku-ring-gai, North Shore and Pittwater, which (as single-member seats) have never been held by Labor. In some cases, Labor has chosen not to contest the seats, such as at the 2024 Pittwater by-election.

At the 2022 federal election, teal independent candidates contested various North Sydney-based federal electorates, with Labor running dead to ensure that the independent candidate came second (and in many cases, ultimately won the seat). Labor and the Greens also ran dead in several Victorian-based seats contested by "teals", including Goldstein and Kooyong.

=== 2015 Canning by-election ===
At the 2015 Canning by-election, Labor was accused of running dead in the Liberal-held seat as part of an effort to keep Tony Abbott as prime minister (if the Liberals retained the seat), based on the view that they would rather face Abbott at the next federal election rather than a different Liberal leader. Labor leader Bill Shorten denied the claims. Abbott would ultimately be spilled as leader by Malcolm Turnbull on 14 September 2015, and at the by-election held just four days later on 19 September, the Liberals retained the seat with a 6.55% negative two-party-preferred swing.
