= Adam Marshall =

Australian politician

The Honourable Adam Marshall
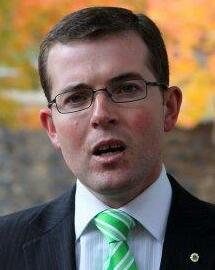

Minister for Agriculture and Western New South Wales
- In office 2 April 2019 – 21 December 2021
- Premier: Gladys Berejiklian; Dominic Perrottet
- Preceded by: Niall Blair (as the Minister for Primary Industries); John Barilaro (as the Minister for Western New South Wales)
- Succeeded by: Dugald Saunders

Minister for Tourism and Major Events Assistant Minister for Skills
- In office 30 January 2017 – 23 March 2019
- Premier: Gladys Berejiklian
- Preceded by: Stuart Ayres (as the Minister for Trade, Tourism and Major Events)
- Succeeded by: Stuart Ayres (as the Minister for Jobs, Investment, Tourism and Western Sydney)

Member of the New South Wales Legislative Assembly for Northern Tablelands
- In office 25 May 2013 – 13 May 2024
- Preceded by: Richard Torbay
- Succeeded by: Brendan Moylan

Personal details
- Born: 4 September 1984 (age 42) Emerald, Queensland, Australia
- Party: National
- Other political affiliations: Labor (until 2004)

Adam John Marshall (born 4 September 1984) is an Australian politician who represented Northern Tablelands in the New South Wales Legislative Assembly from 2013 to 2024, as a member of The Nationals. He resigned on 13 May 2024.

He previously served as the New South Wales Minister for Tourism and Major Events and the Assistant Minister for Skills in the first Berejiklian ministry. He was the Minister for Agriculture and Western New South Wales in the second Berejiklian ministry and First Perrottet ministry. Following the Cabinet reshuffle from Dominic Perrottet, Marshall was removed from the frontbench.

== Early years and education ==
Marshall received his elementary education while attending Gunnedah South Public School before completing his secondary studies at Farrer Memorial Agricultural High School where he earned the higher school certificate. In his final year, he was voted by his peers as the "person most likely to be Australian Prime Minister", which is a prediction he is also said to have made as a youth, to fellow students on the school bus.

== Political career ==
Elected to Gunnedah Shire Council in 2004, aged 19, Marshall became deputy mayor and then mayor of Gunnedah, an office his father once held, after the 2008 local government elections. During his time as Mayor, Marshall served as president of the Country Mayors' Association and Senior Vice-President of the Shires Association of NSW. Marshall moved to Armidale in 2012, resigning from the council, and commenced studying commerce at the University of New England, prior to his endorsement as a candidate for the March 2013 by-election held after sitting independent member Richard Torbay was forced out of politics amid allegations of corruption.

Marshall would claim victory on election night having receiving over 60% of the vote, subsequently being declared the winner with a margin of more than 30%. This was not considered an upset; in 2011, the Nationals would have won it with a majority of 26.1 percent in a "traditional" matchup with Country Labor. Marshall won a full term almost as easily in 2015, boosting his majority to 27.1 percent, the third-safest in the state. He was reelected in 2019, and now sits on a majority of 33.8 percent, the safest in the state.

During his preselection bid ahead of the Northern Tablelands by-election in 2013, it was revealed that Marshall once held concurrent membership with both the Nationals and Labor from 2001 to 2003, while also being employed on the staff of independent Member for Tamworth, Peter Draper. Country Labor organiser Courtney Roche said Marshall would have been deemed to be a card carrying member of the party until 2004, after which his membership expired.

Having served on several standing, select and statutory Parliamentary Committees, as well as in the position of Temporary Speaker, Marshall was appointed to the position of Parliamentary Secretary for Northern New South Wales and Renewable Energy on 25 August 2016.

Following the resignation of Mike Baird as Premier, Gladys Berejiklian was elected as Liberal leader and sworn in as Premier. The first Berejiklian ministry was subsequently formed with Marshall sworn in as the Minister for Tourism and Major Events, and Assistant Minister for Skills with effect from 30 January 2017. Following the 2019 state election Marshall was appointed the Minister for Agriculture and Western New South Wales in the second Berejiklian ministry with effect from 2 April 2019.

== Personal life ==
Marshall has an honorary membership to the Gunnedah Rotary Club as well as a life membership to the Gunnedah Jockey Club.

On 27 June 2014, Marshall was stopped for a random breath test while driving and returned a blood alcohol reading of 0.112. On 15 July he pleaded guilty to and was convicted of mid range drink driving. Marshall's counsel argued in mitigation that he was suffering from a head cold which may have impaired his awareness of his level of intoxication. He was disqualified from driving for nine months and fined $2,000. It was subsequently revealed that Marshall had incurred 17 speeding offences since 2002, and that his licence had been suspended on three occasions between 2003 and 2011. He was able to avoid a fourth suspension in May 2014 by entering into a good-behaviour bond.

On 24 June 2021, it was reported that Marshall had contracted COVID-19. This led to the state parliament being locked down, with MPs unable to enter or leave for a period of time.

New South Wales Legislative Assembly
Preceded by Richard Torbay	Member for Northern Tablelands; 2013–2024	Succeeded by Brendan Moylan
Political offices
Preceded by Niall Blair as Minister for Primary Industries	Minister for Agriculture and Western New South Wales; 2019–2021	Succeeded by Dugald Saunders
Preceded by John Barilaro as Minister for Western New South Wales	Minister for Agriculture and Western New South Wales; 2019–2021	Succeeded by Dugald Saunders
Preceded by Stuart Ayres as Minister for Trade, Tourism and Major Events	Minister for Tourism and Major Events; 2017–2019	Succeeded by Stuart Ayres as Minister for Jobs, Investment, Tourism and Western Sydney
New title	Assistant Minister for Skills; 2017–2019	Portfolio abolished
