= Armidale Dumaresq Shire =

Former local government area in New South Wales, Australia

Armidale Dumaresq
- Local government area
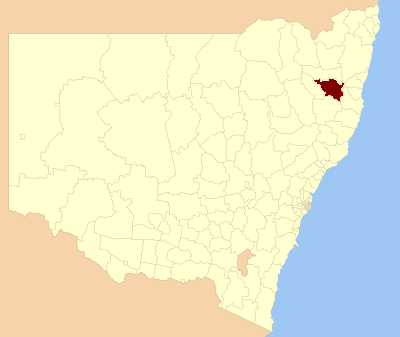
- Location in New South Wales
- Coordinates: 30°30′S 151°40′E
- Country: Australia
- State: New South Wales
- Region: New England
- Established: 2000
- Abolished: 12 May 2016
- Council seat: Armidale

Government
  - Mayor: Jim Maher
  - State electorate: Northern Tablelands
  - Federal division: New England

Area
  - Total: 4,235 km^{2} (1,635 sq mi)

Population
  - Total: 24,105 (2011 census)
  - Density: 5.6919/km^{2} (14.7418/sq mi)
- Website: Armidale Dumaresq
LGAs around Armidale Dumaresq
Guyra	Guyra	Clarence Valley
Uralla	Armidale Dumaresq	Bellingen
Uralla	Walcha	Kempsey

The Armidale Dumaresq Council was a local government area in the New England and Northern Tablelands regions of New South Wales, Australia. This area was formed in 2000 from the merger of the original City of Armidale with the surrounding Dumaresq Shire and abolished on 12 May 2016, where the council, together with Guyra Shire, was subsumed into the Armidale Regional Council with immediate effect.

The combined former area covered the urban area of Armidale and the surrounding region, extending primarily eastward from the city through farming districts to the gorges and escarpments that mark the edge of the Northern Tablelands.

The last mayor of the Armidale Dumaresq Council was Herman Beyersdorf until the council was abolished on 12 May 2016, amalgamating with Guyra Shire to form the Armidale Regional Council.

== History ==
Villages located in the former area included Kellys Plains, Dangarsleigh, Wollomombi and Hillgrove.

=== Amalgamation ===
A 2015 review of local government boundaries recommended that the Armidale Dumaresq Council merge with adjoining councils. The government considered two proposals. The first proposed a merger of the Armidale Dumaresq Council and the Guyra Shire Council merge to form a new council with an area of 8,621 square kilometres (3,329 sq mi) and support a population of approximately 30,000. The alternative, proposed by the Armidale Dumaresq Council on 1 March 2016, was for an amalgamation of the Armidale Dumaresq, Guyra, Uralla and Walcha councils. Following an independent review, on 12 May 2016 the Minister for Local Government announced that the merger with the Guyra Shire would proceed with immediate effect.

== Demographics ==
At the 2011 census, there were 24,105 people in the Armidale Dumaresq local government area, of these 47.8% were male and 52.2% were female. Aboriginal and Torres Strait Islander people made up 6.3% of the population which is nearly three times higher than both the national and state averages. The median age of people in the Armidale Dumaresq Council area was 35 years; slightly below the national median. Children aged 0 – 14 years made up 19.1% of the population and people aged 65 years and over made up 14.4% of the population. Of people in the area aged 15 years and over, 42.5% were married and 10.7% were either divorced or separated.

Population growth in the Armidale Dumaresq Council area between the 2001 census and the 2011 census was marginal. When compared with total population growth of Australia for the same periods, being 5.78% and 8.32% respectively, population growth in the Armidale Dumaresq local government area was significantly lower than the national average. The median weekly income for residents within the Armidale Dumaresq Council area was below the national average.

At the 2011 census, the proportion of residents in the Armidale Dumaresq local government area who stated their ancestry as Australian or Anglo-Saxon exceeded 78% of all residents (national average was 65.2%). In excess of 58% of all residents in the Armidale Dumaresq Council area nominated a religious affiliation with Christianity at the 2011 census, which was higher than the national average of 50.2%. Meanwhile, as at the census date, compared to the national average, households in the Armidale Dumaresq local government area had a lower than average proportion (7.0%) where two or more languages are spoken (national average was 20.4%); and a higher proportion (88.1%) where English only was spoken at home (national average was 76.8%).

Selected historical census data for Armidale Dumaresq local government area
Census year		2001	2006	2011
Population	Estimated residents on Census night	23,920	23,368	24,105
Population	LGA rank in terms of size within New South Wales		73rd	
Population	% of New South Wales population			0.35%
Population	% of Australian population	0.13%	▼0.12%	▲0.11%
Cultural and language diversity				
Ancestry, top responses	Australian			31.5%
Ancestry, top responses	English			28.8%
Ancestry, top responses	Irish			9.7%
Ancestry, top responses	Scottish			8.6%
Ancestry, top responses	German			3.8%
Language, top responses (other than English)	Arabic	n/c	▲0.2%	▲0.8%
Language, top responses (other than English)	Mandarin	0.3%	▲0.5%	▲0.6%
Language, top responses (other than English)	German	0.4%	0.4%	0.4%
Language, top responses (other than English)	Bengali	n/c	n/c	▲0.3%
Language, top responses (other than English)	Cantonese	0.3%	0.3%	▼0.2%
Religious affiliation				
Religious affiliation, top responses	Anglican	30.4%	▼29.2%	▼26.9%
Religious affiliation, top responses	Catholic	23.9%	▼23.2%	▼22.3%
Religious affiliation, top responses	No Religion	18.0%	▼16.2%	▲21.3%
Religious affiliation, top responses	Presbyterian and Reformed	6.6%	▼6.0%	▼5.1%
Religious affiliation, top responses	Uniting Church	3.4%	▲4.7%	▼3.8%
Median weekly incomes				
Personal income	Median weekly personal income		A$384	A$494
Personal income	% of Australian median income		82.4%	85.6%
Family income	Median weekly family income		A$1,105	A$1,292
Family income	% of Australian median income		94.4%	87.2%
Household income	Median weekly household income		A$855	A$991
Household income	% of Australian median income		83.3%	80.3%

== Council ==
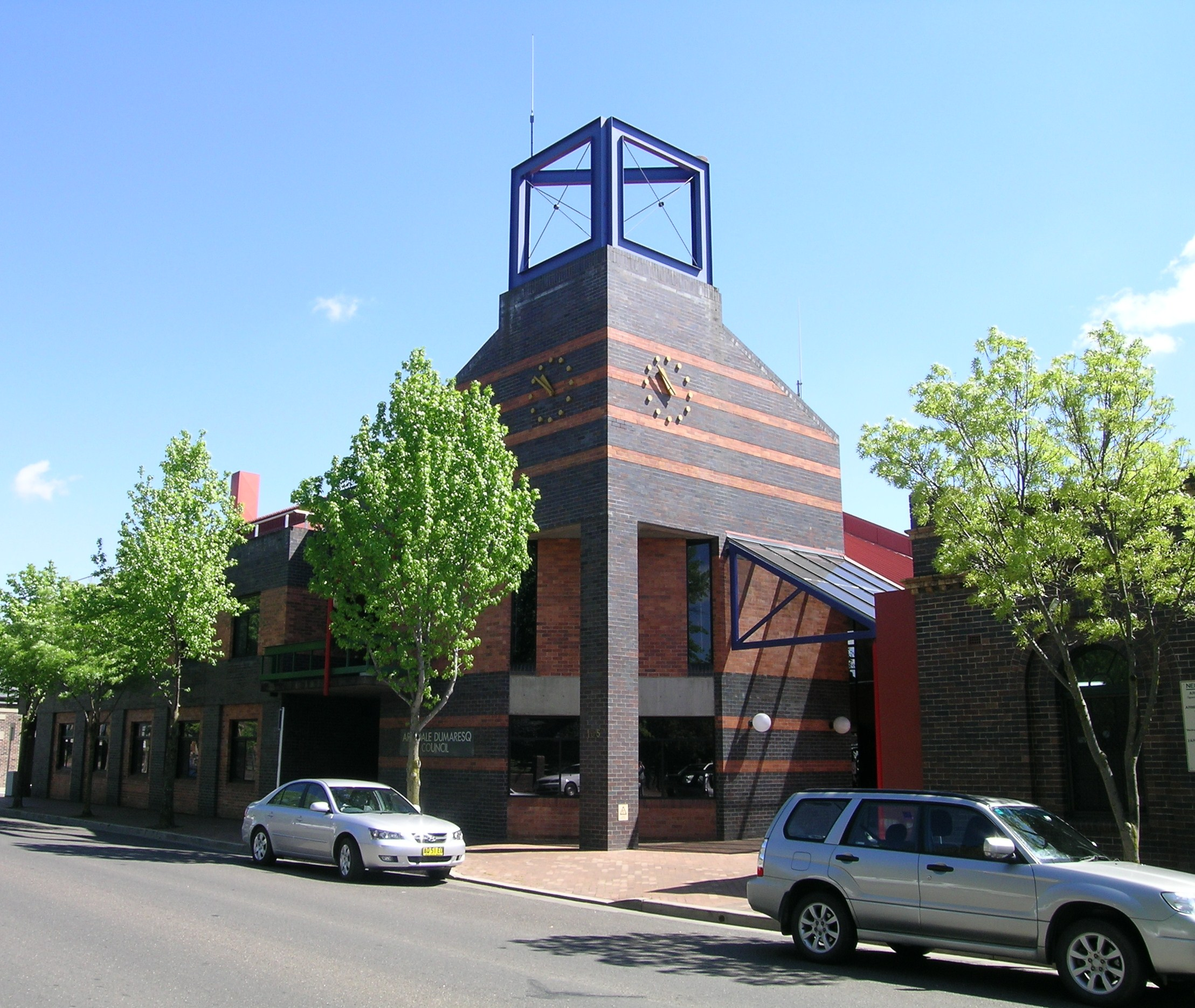
The former Armidale Dumaresq Council office building. Armidale, NSW

=== Former composition and election method ===
Armidale Dumaresq Council was composed of nine councillors elected proportionally as a single ward. All councillors were elected for a fixed four-year term of office. The mayor was elected by the councillors at the first meeting of the council. The most recent and last election was held on 8 September 2012, and the makeup of the council, prior to its abolition, was as follows:

Party	Councillors
Independents and Unaligned	8
Liberal Party	1
The Greens	1
Total	10

The last Council, elected in 2012 until its abolition in 2016, in order of election, was:

Councillor	Party	Notes
Margaret O'Connor	Liberal	
Peter O'Donohue	The Greens	
Jim Maher	Unaligned	Mayor
Herman Beyersdorf	Labor	Deputy Mayor
Bob Richardson	Unaligned	
Andrew Murat	Unaligned	
Laurie Bishop	Independent	
Jenny Bailey	Independent	
Colin Gadd	Unaligned	
Christopher Halligan	Unaligned	

== Election results ==
=== 2012 ===
Elected councillor	Party
Margaret O'Connor	Liberal
Peter O'Donohue	Greens
Jim Maher	Independent
Herman Beyersdorf	Armidale First
Bob Richardson	Independent
Andrew Murat	Independent
Laurie Bishop	Independent (Group B)
Jenny Bailey	Independent (Group E)
Colin Gadd	Independent
Christopher Halligan	Independent

2012 New South Wales local elections: Armidale Dumaresq
Party	Candidate	Votes	%	±%
Liberal		1,886	15.1	+3.4
Greens		1,720	13.8	+4.2
Independent	Jim Maher	1,457	11.7	
Armidale First		1,401	11.2	
Independent (Group B)		1,164	9.3	
Independent	Bob Richardson	935	7.5	
Independent	Andrew Murat	828	6.6	
Independent (Group E)		708	5.7	
Independent (Group D)		653	5.2	
Independent	Christopher Halligan	435	3.5	
Independent	Colin Gadd	430	3.4	
Independent	Jack Rapely	250	2.0	
Independent	Allan Mitchell	241	1.9	
Independent	Vicki Kembery	237	1.9	
Independent	Anthony Hardwick	138	1.1	
Turnout			82.0	

== See also ==
- Local government areas of New South Wales
