= Conargo Shire =

Former local government area in New South Wales, Australia

Conargo Shire New South Wales
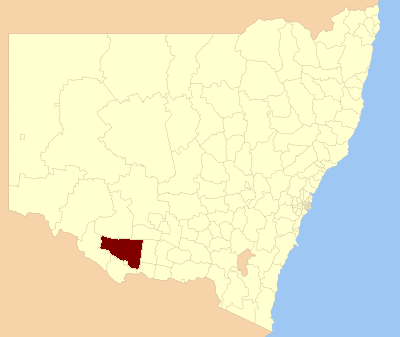
- Location in New South Wales
- Coordinates: 35°19′S 145°09′E
- Population: 1,577 (2012)
  - Density: 0.18048/km^{2} (0.46743/sq mi)
- Established: 1907
- Abolished: 12 May 2016
- Area: 8,738 km^{2} (3,373.8 sq mi)
- Council seat: Conargo
- Region: Riverina
- State electorate(s): Murray
- Federal division(s): Farrer
- Website: Conargo Shire
LGAs around Conargo Shire:
Hay	Murrumbidgee	Murrumbidgee
Wakool	Conargo Shire	Jerilderie
Murray	Deniliquin	Berrigan

Conargo Shire was a local government area in the Riverina region in southern New South Wales, Australia.

== Localities ==
The Shire was divided into four wards, and contained six villages - Conargo, Blighty, Mayrung, Pretty Pine, Wanganella and Booroorban.

== History ==
Conargo Shire was established in 1907. In 2001 the former Windouran Shire was absorbed into Conargo Shire. This amalgamation resulted in an additional 5,090 square kilometres (1,970 sq mi) and another 387 residents.

Before mergers in recent decades it was a common in New South Wales for rural shires to have their offices in an adjacent rural municipality (rural town). At the time of its abolition, the only surviving case was Conargo Shire Council's offices in Deniliquin.

=== Amalgamation ===
A 2015 review of local government boundaries by the NSW Government Independent Pricing and Regulatory Tribunal recommended that the Conargo Shire merge with the Deniliquin Council to form a new council with an area of 8,881 square kilometres (3,429 sq mi) and support a population of approximately 9,000.

On 12 March 2016, Conargo Shire was abolished and, along with the former Deniliquin Council, the area incorporated into the new Edward River Council.

== Council ==
Conargo Shire Council

Type
- Type: Unicameral

History
- Founded: 1907
- Disbanded: 12 March 2016
- Succeeded by: Edward River Council

Structure
- Seats: 8
- Last Mayor: Norm Brennan

Elections
- Voting system: Optional preferential voting with four two-member wards
- Last election: 2012

Meeting place
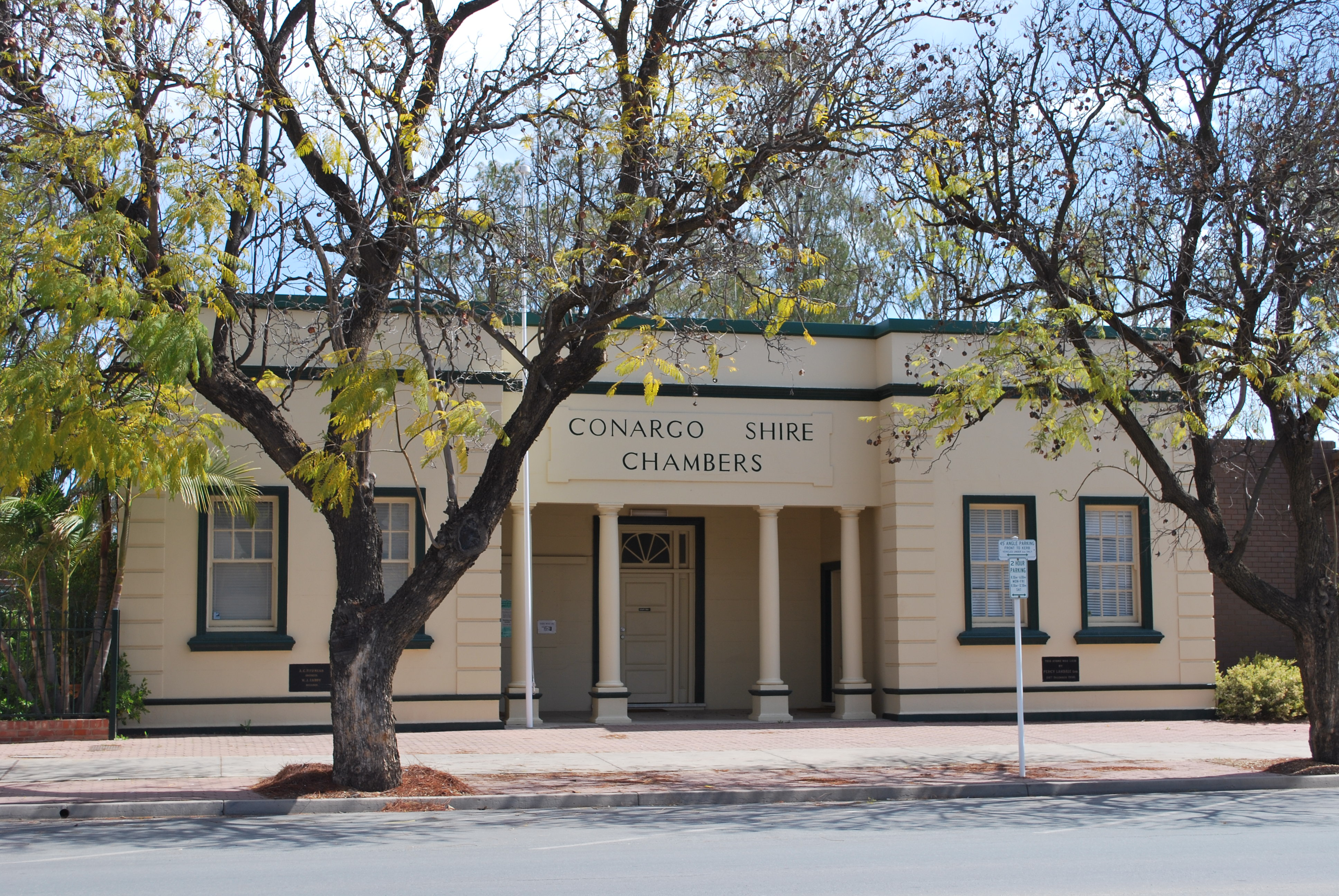
- Conargo Shire Council Chambers; Deniliquin, New South Wales

=== Composition and election method ===
The last election for the council was due to be held on 8 September 2012. However, only eight candidates, being the below, nominated for election. There being no additional candidates, the election was uncontested. The makeup of the final council was as follows:

Party	Councillors
Independents and Unaligned	8
Total	8

The final Council, elected in 2012, in order of election by ward, was:

Ward	Councillor	Party	Notes
A Ward	Bernard Clancy	Unaligned	
A Ward	Mac Wallace	Unaligned	
B Ward	Norm Brennan	Unaligned	Mayor
B Ward	Nick Metcalfe	Unaligned	
C Ward	Donald Henderson	Unaligned	
C Ward	Norm McAllister	Unaligned	
D Ward	Sally Dye	Independent	
D Ward	Peter McCrabb	Unaligned	
