= Warragoon, New South Wales =

Warragoon
- Town
- Coordinates: 35°36′S 145°12′E
- Country: Australia
- State: New South Wales
- LGA: Edward River Council
- Location: 11 km (6.8 mi) from Tuppal; 14 km (8.7 mi) from Blighty

Government
  - State electorate: Murray
  - Federal division: Farrer

Population
  - Total: 98 (2021 census)
- Postcode: 2710
- County: Townsend

Warragoon is a small community in the central part of the Riverina. It is situated by road, about 11 kilometres north west from Tuppal and 14 kilometres south west from Blighty. At the 2021 census, Warragoon had a population of 98.

Warragoon had a public school from July 1955 to December 1982, situated on Warragoon Lane, off the Riverina Highway.
