= Conargo =

- Town
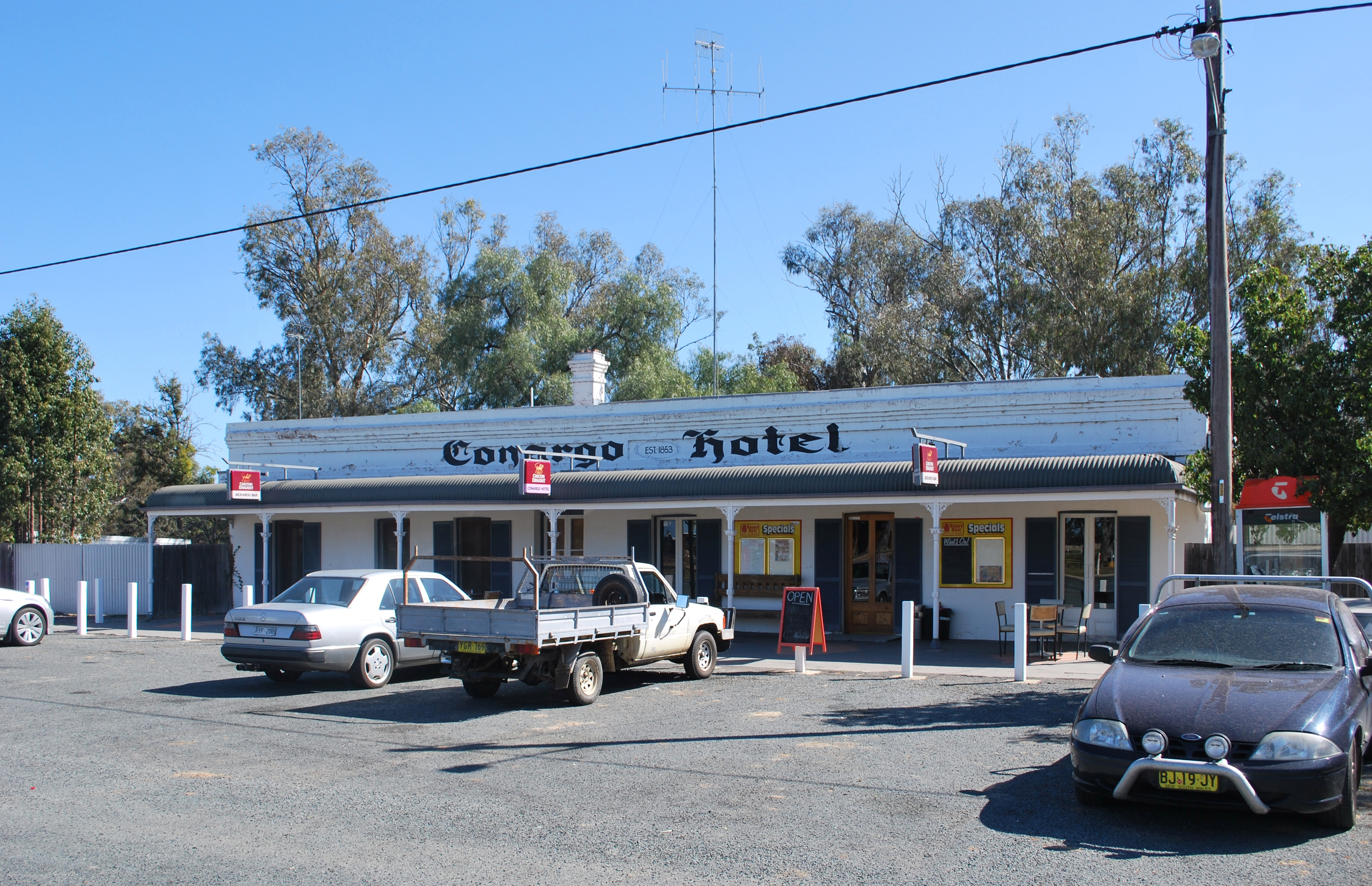
- The "famed" Conargo Pub praised by the Ute Muster sub-culture

- Coordinates: 35°19′S 145°09′E
- Country: Australia
- State: New South Wales
- LGA: Edward River Council
- Location: 676 km (420 mi) SW of Sydney; 191 km (119 mi) S of Griffith; 34 km (21 mi) from Wanganella; 26 km (16 mi) from Coree

Government
  - State electorate: Murray
  - Federal division: Farrer
- Elevation: 95 m (312 ft)

Population
  - Total: 117 (2006 census)
- Postcode: 2710
- County: Townsend

Conargo /kɒˈnɑːrɡoʊ/ is a town in the Riverina region of New South Wales, Australia. The town is in the Edward River Council local government area. It is on Billabong Creek, a tributary of the Edward River. The nearest towns are Jerilderie and Deniliquin. At the 2006 census, Conargo had a population of 117 people.

The Aboriginal name for the locality of Conargo was 'Gooriara', meaning "hopping" or "kangaroo ground".

The actual town itself is quite small, with only a pub, a convenience store that sells fuel and a small number of houses. There are five nearby villages – Blighty, Mayrung, Pretty Pine, Wanganella and Booroorban.

The surrounding rural area consists of large sheep stations, including some Merino studs.

== History ==
In 1859 William McKenzie opened the Conargo Inn there (named after the nearby "Conargo" pastoral run). A township at Conargo was laid out in 1860 by the surveyor McCulloch. During 1865 another hotel was built at the village – the Riverine Hotel (publican James McKeys). At about the same time the Conargo Inn, together with 320 acres (1.3 km^{2}), was sold for £1,857 to T. Robertson. Conargo Post Office opened on 1 September 1864 and closed in 1988. In 1866 Conargo was reported as having a population of thirty persons, with a post-office, a store, and two hotels. In 1867 the Billabong Hotel was added to Conargo's hotels (with David Rogers as its first publican). In 1869 the Baker brothers built a store there. In 1872 Conargo was described as a small village with a store and three hotels.

In February 1878 a correspondent to the Town and Country Journal said: "Conargo... was once – according to tradition – intended to be a town, which attempt finally diminished to a total failure". The writer added that the proprietor of the only store in the village had recently died after "a long and continued illness". Of the three hotels it was claimed the Conargo Hotel was the "better house", doing "a great deal more business than the other two combined".

The Conargo Public School opened in 1879.

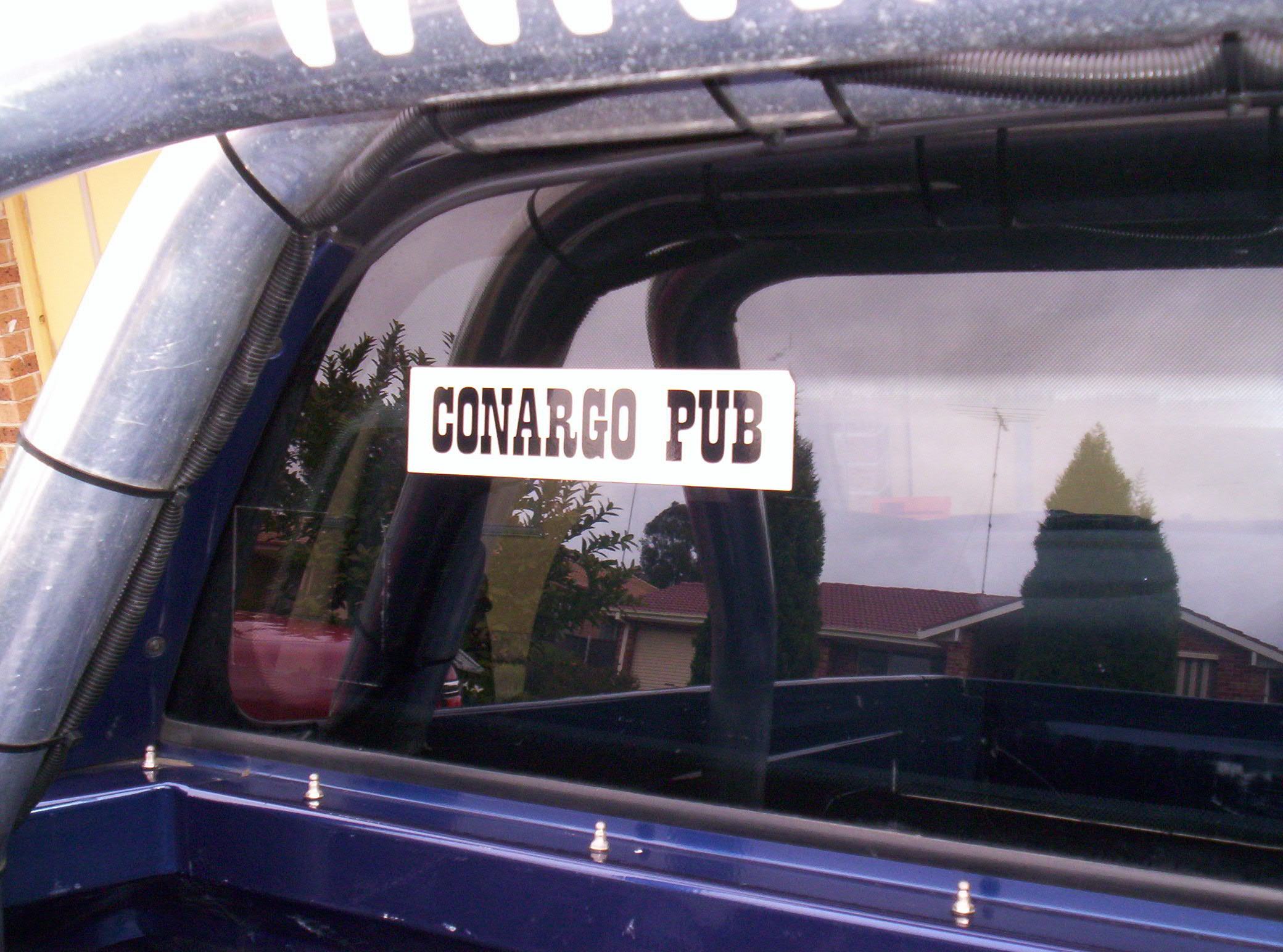
A "Conargo Pub" sticker on the back window of a Holden Commodore Ute

The Conargo Pub was destroyed by fire on 11 November 2014. It was re-opened in October 2022.

== See also ==
- Bachelor and Spinster Balls
