= Windouran Shire =

Former local government area in New South Wales, Australia

Windouran Shire New South Wales
- Established: 7 March 1906
- Abolished: 1 July 2001
- Council seat: Deniliquin
- Region: Riverina

Windouran Shire was a local government area in the Riverina region of New South Wales, Australia.

Windouran Shire was proclaimed on 7 March 1906. The shire contained the villages of Pretty Pine, Wanganella and Booroorban and the Council offices were located in neighbouring Deniliquin.

Following an inquiry into the financial sustainability of the Shire in 2000, Windouran Shire was absorbed into the neighbouring Conargo Shire on 1 July 2001.
