= Murray Shire =

Former local government area in New South Wales, Australia

- Local government area
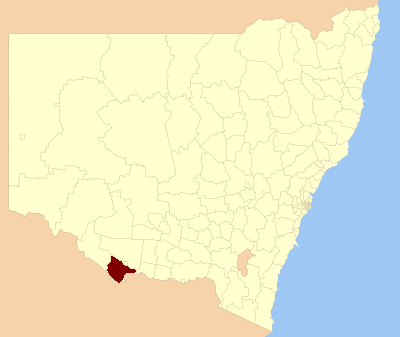
- Location of the former shire in New South Wales
- Coordinates: 35°49′S 144°54′E
- Country: Australia
- State: New South Wales
- Region: Murray
- Established: 1906
- Abolished: 12 May 2016
- Council seat: Mathoura

Government
  - Mayor: Thomas Weyrich (Independent)
  - State electorate: Murray
  - Federal division: Farrer

Area
  - Total: 4,345 km^{2} (1,678 sq mi)

Population
  - Total: 7,312 (2012)
  - Density: 1.5/km^{2} (3.9/sq mi)
- Website: Murray Shire
LGAs around Murray Shire
Conargo	Deniliquin	Conargo
Wakool	Murray Shire	Berrigan
Campaspe (Vic)	Campaspe (Vic)	Moira (Vic)

Murray Shire was a local government area in the Murray region of south western New South Wales, Australia. It included the towns of Moama and Mathoura. It was abolished on 12 May 2016 and its area merged with the Wakool Shire to establish the Murray River Council.

The last mayor of Murray Shire was Thomas Weyrich, an independent politician.

== History ==
The Murray Shire region was developed in the 1840s by squatters following the route of the overlanders as they drove cattle from Sydney to Adelaide in the late 1830s. From the 1860s onwards, the selectors, mainly from Victoria, moved onto the squatter's land, their interest agriculture. The settlements of Moama and Mathoura survived over the years as centres for the movement of agriculture produce and the growth of the timber industry. The area covered by the Shire of Murray today is unique. The Cadell Fault, which changed the course of the Murray River about 30,000 years ago traverses the area from north to south. The Murray River system supports one of the largest river red gum forests in the world.

A 2015 review of local government boundaries by the NSW Government Independent Pricing and Regulatory Tribunal recommended that the Murray Shire merge with the Wakool Shire to form a new council with an area of 11,865 square kilometres (4,581 sq mi) and support a population of approximately 11,500. On 12 May 2016 the Minister for Local Government announced the dissolution of the Murray and Wakool shires and the formation of the Murray River Council with immediate effect.

== Council ==
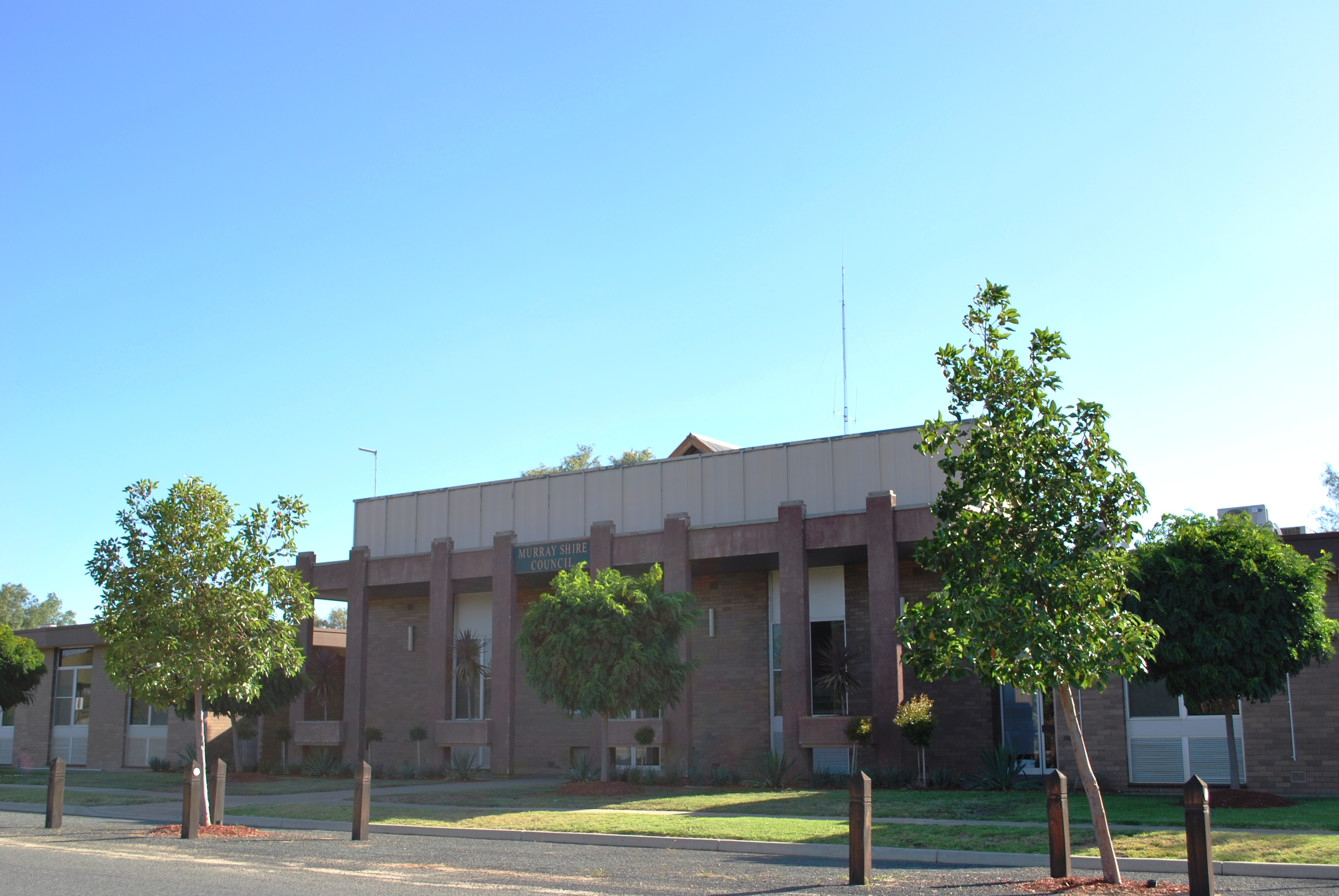
Shire office at Mathoura.

=== Composition and election method ===
Prior to its dissolution, the Murray Shire Council was composed of nine councillors elected proportionally as a single ward. All councillors were elected for a fixed four-year term of office. The mayor was elected by the councillors at the first meeting of the council. The most recent and last election was held on 8 September 2012 and the makeup of the former council was as follows:

Party	Councillors
Independents and Unaligned	9
Total	9

The former council, elected in 2012 and dissolved in 2016, in order of election, was:

Councillor	Party	Notes
Thomas Weyrich	Independent	Mayor
Bill Anderson	Unaligned	
Brian Sharp OAM	Independent	
Betty Murphy	Independent	
Ian Moon	Independent	
Gavin Burke	Independent	
Gen Campbell	Independent	
John Pocklington	Unaligned	Deputy Mayor
Sue Mulcahy	Independent	
