= Urana Shire =

Former local government area in New South Wales, Australia

- Local government area
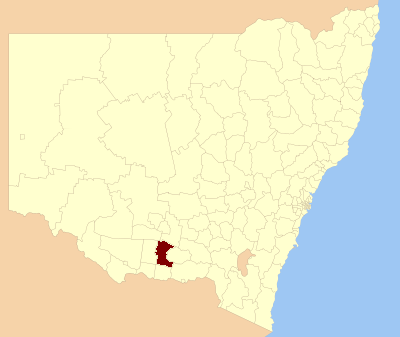
- Location within New South Wales

- Coordinates: 35°19′S 146°16′E
- Country: Australia
- State: New South Wales
- Region: Riverina
- Established: 1906
- Abolished: 2016
- Council seat: Urana

Government
  - State electorate: Albury
  - Federal division: Farrer

Area
  - Total: 3,356 km^{2} (1,296 sq mi)

Population
  - Total: 1,180 (2012)
  - Density: 0.3516/km^{2} (0.911/sq mi)
- Website: Urana Shire
LGAs around Urana Shire
Murrumbidgee	Narrandera	Wagga Wagga
Jerilderie	Urana Shire	Lockhart
Berrigan	Corowa	Greater Hume

Urana Shire was a local government area in the Riverina region of New South Wales, Australia. The Newell Highway crosses its north-west corner. The Shire included the town of Urana and the small towns of Boree Creek, Morundah, Oaklands and Rand.

The last mayor of Urana Shire was Patrick Bourke an unaligned politician.

== Amalgamation ==
A 2015 review of local government boundaries by the NSW Government Independent Pricing and Regulatory Tribunal recommended that the Urana Shire merge with the Lockhart and Corowa shires to form a new council with an area of 8,581 square kilometres (3,313 sq mi) and support a population of approximately 16,000. Following an independent review, on 12 May 2016 the Minister for Local Government announced that the merger with the Corowa Shire would proceed with immediate effect to form the Federation Council.

== Council ==
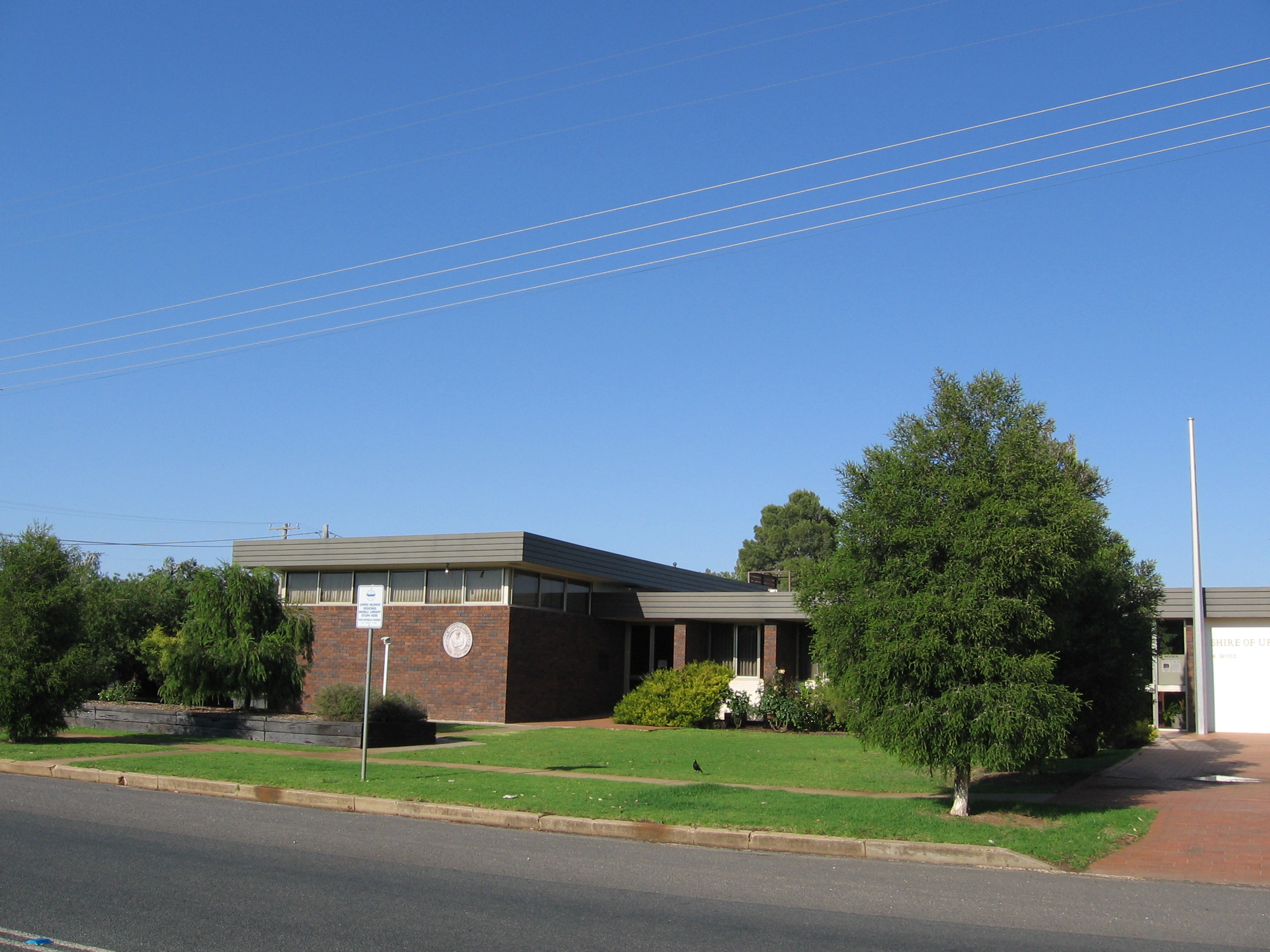
The administration office of the Urana Shire Council, Urana.

=== Composition and election method ===
At the time of dissolution, Urana Shire Council was composed of nine councillors elected proportionally as three separate wards, each electing three councillors. All councillors were elected for a fixed four-year term of office. The mayor was elected by the councillors at the first meeting of the council. The last election was held on 8 September 2012. In the B and C Wards, only three candidates, being those below, nominated for election. There being no additional candidates, the election for these Wards was uncontested. In the A Ward, an election was held.

== See also ==
- Riverina Water County Council
