= Coree, New South Wales =

Coree
- Town
- Coordinates: 35°22′S 145°28′E
- Country: Australia
- State: New South Wales
- LGA: Murrumbidgee Council
- Location: 43 km (27 mi) from Jerilderie; 48 km (30 mi) from Conargo

Government
  - State electorate: Albury
  - Federal division: Farrer
- Elevation: 95 m (312 ft)

Population
  - Total: 91 (2006 census)
- Postcode: 2710
- County: Townsend

Coree is a community in the central part of the Riverina in New South Wales, Australia. It is situated about 43 kilometres west of Jerilderie and 48 kilometres east of Conargo. At the 2006 census, Coree had a population of 91. The name could have derived from an Aboriginal word meaning 'charcoal'.

There was once a village located in Coree on Conargo Rd here. Today nothing remains of the Coree village besides street names visible on maps.

Coree Post Office opened on 15 March 1875 and closed in 1892.

Coree Football Club played in the Southern Riverina Football Association (SRFA) between 1916 and 1932. They were runners up to Finley in the 1929 SRFA grand final.
