= Corowa Shire =

Former local government area in New South Wales, Australia

Corowa Shire New South Wales
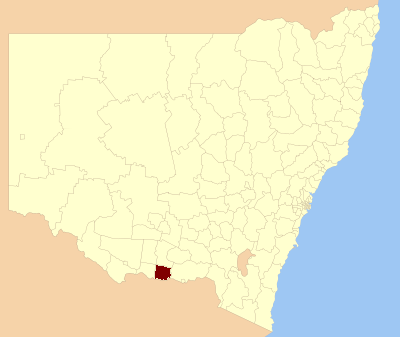
- Location in New South Wales
- Coordinates: 35°59′S 146°23′E
- Population: 11,383 (2012)
  - Density: 4.8875/km^{2} (12.659/sq mi)
- Established: 1955
- Abolished: 2016
- Area: 2,329 km^{2} (899.2 sq mi)
- Council seat: Corowa
- Region: Riverina
- State electorate(s): Albury
- Federal division(s): Division of Farrer
- Website: Corowa Shire
LGAs around Corowa Shire:
Jerilderie	Urana	Lockhart
Berrigan	Corowa Shire	Greater Hume
Moira (Vic)	Indigo (Vic)	Indigo (Vic)

Corowa Shire was a local government area in the Riverina region in southern New South Wales, Australia. The area was located adjacent to the Murray River and the Riverina Highway.

The Shire included the towns of Corowa, Howlong, Balldale, Coreen and Daysdale, Rennie and Mulwala.

It was established in 1955 through a merger of the Corowa Municipality and Coreen Shire.

== Amalgamation ==
A 2015 review of local government boundaries by the NSW Government Independent Pricing and Regulatory Tribunal recommended that the Corowa Shire merge with the Lockhart and Urana shires to form a new council with an area of 8,581 square kilometres (3,313 sq mi) and support a population of approximately 16,000. The council was dissolved on 12 May 2016 and along with Urana Shire the area became part of the new Federation Council

== Council ==
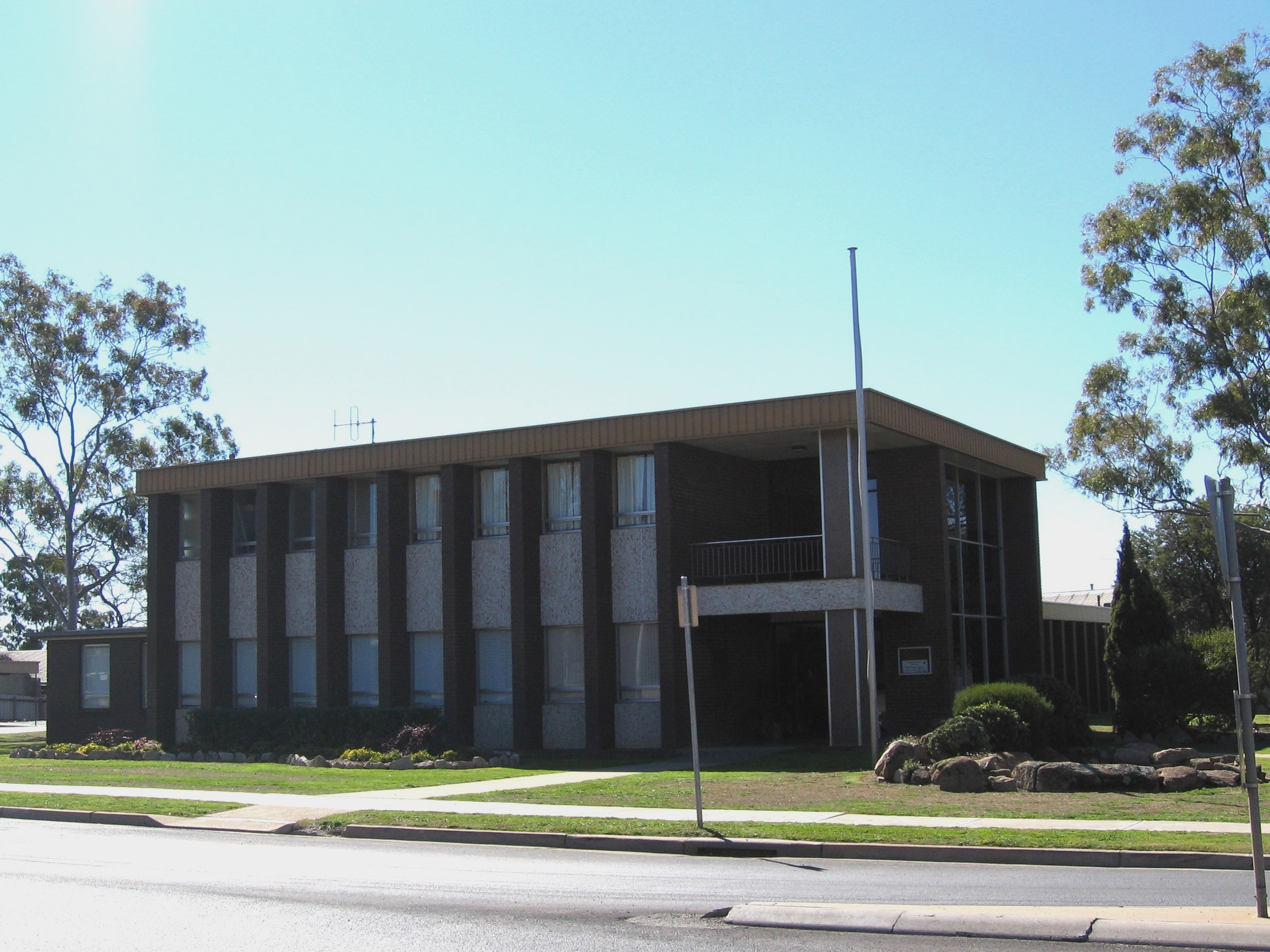
Corowa Shire Council offices, Corowa.

=== Composition and election method ===
At the time of dissolution, Corowa Shire Council was composed of nine councillors elected proportionally as a single ward. All councillors were elected for a fixed four-year term of office. The last election was due to be held on 8 September 2012. However, only nine candidates, being the below, nominated for election. There being no additional candidates, the election was uncontested.
