= Deniliquin Council =

Former local government area in New South Wales, Australia

- Local government area
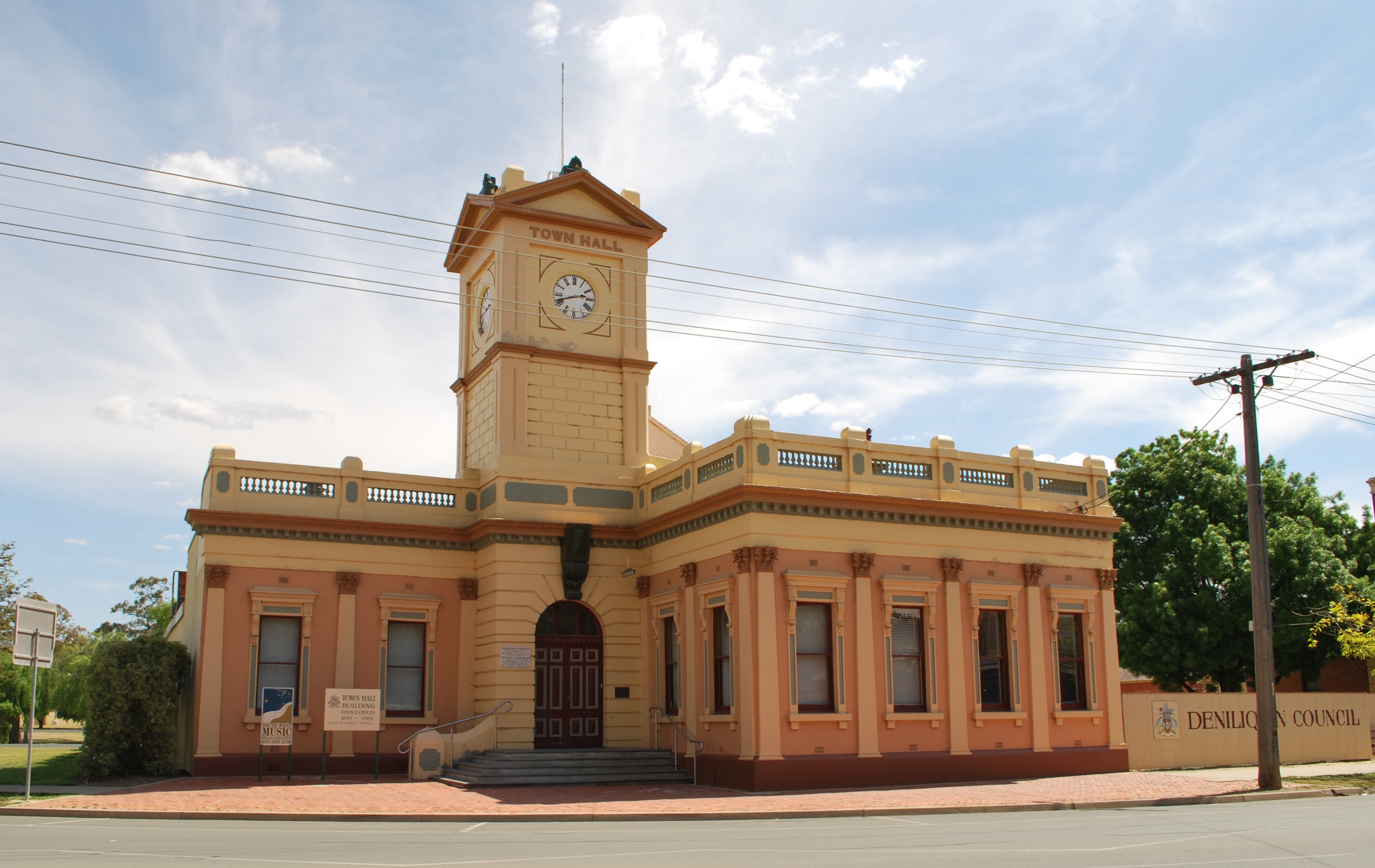
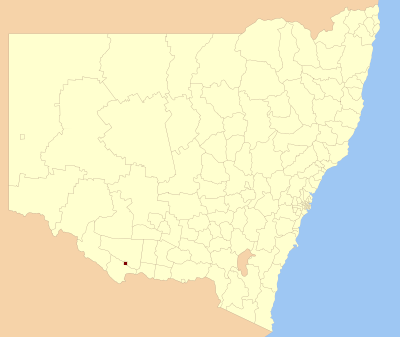
- Town hall Location in New South Wales
- Coordinates: 35°32′S 144°58′E
- Country: Australia
- State: New South Wales
- Region: Riverina
- Established: 16 December 1868
- Abolished: 12 May 2016
- Council seat: Deniliquin

Government
  - Mayor: Lindsay Renwick (Independent)
  - State electorate: Murray
  - Federal division: Farrer

Area
  - Total: 143.2 km^{2} (55.3 sq mi)

Population
  - Total: 7,327 (2012)
  - Density: 51.166/km^{2} (132.52/sq mi)
- Website: Deniliquin Council
LGAs around Deniliquin Council
Conargo	Conargo	Conargo
Murray	Deniliquin Council	Conargo
Murray	Murray	Murray

Deniliquin Council was a local government area in the Riverina region of south-western New South Wales, Australia. At the date of its abolition, Deniliquin Council was the last rural local government area in New South Wales left consisting only of a rural town.

Deniliquin Council was proclaimed as the Municipality of Deniliquin on 16 December 1868.

== Amalgamation ==
A 2015 review of local government boundaries by the NSW Government Independent Pricing and Regulatory Tribunal recommended that the Deniliquin Council merge with the Conargo Shire to form a new council with an area of 8,881 square kilometres (3,429 sq mi) and support a population of approximately 9,000. On 12 March 2016, Deniliquin Council was abolished and, along with the former Conargo Shire, the area incorporated into the new Edward River Council.

== Council ==
=== Composition and election method ===
The last election was due to be held on 8 September 2012. However, only seven candidates, being the below, nominated for election. There being no additional candidates, the election was uncontested. The makeup of the council is as follows:

Party	Councillors
Independents and Unaligned	7
Total	7

The last Council, elected in 2012, in order of election, is:

Councillor	Party	Notes
Peter Connell	Unaligned	
Pat Fogarty	Unaligned	
Ashley Hall	Independent	Deputy Mayor
Andrew Howley	Independent	
Lindsay Renwick	Independent	Mayor
Jeff Shand	Unaligned	
Susan Taylor	Unaligned	
