= Morago =

Morago New South Wales
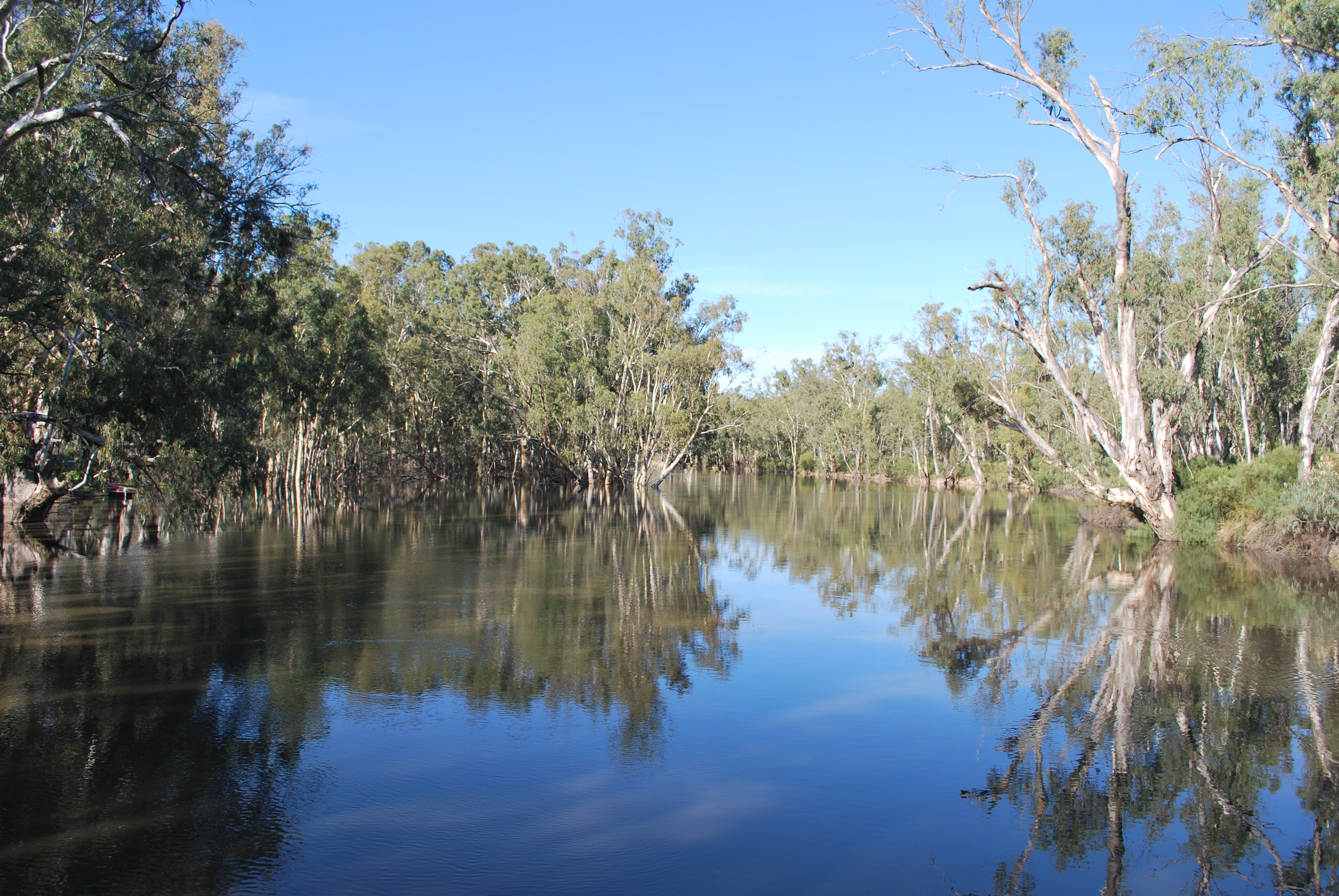
- Edward River at Morago

- Coordinates: 35°22′17″S 144°40′47″E
- Population: 50 (2021 census)
- Postcode(s): 2710
- Elevation: 79 m (259 ft)
- Location: 19 km (12 mi) from Pretty Pine; 86 km (53 mi) from Moulamein
- LGA(s): Edward River Council
- County: Townsend
- State electorate(s): Murray
- Federal division(s): Farrer

Morago is a rural locality in the central part of the Riverina. It is situated by road, about 19 kilometres north west of Pretty Pine and 86 kilometres south east of Moulamein. At the 2021 census, Morago had a population of 50 people.

Morago Post Office opened on 16 September 1904 and closed in 1941.
