= Logie Brae =

- Town
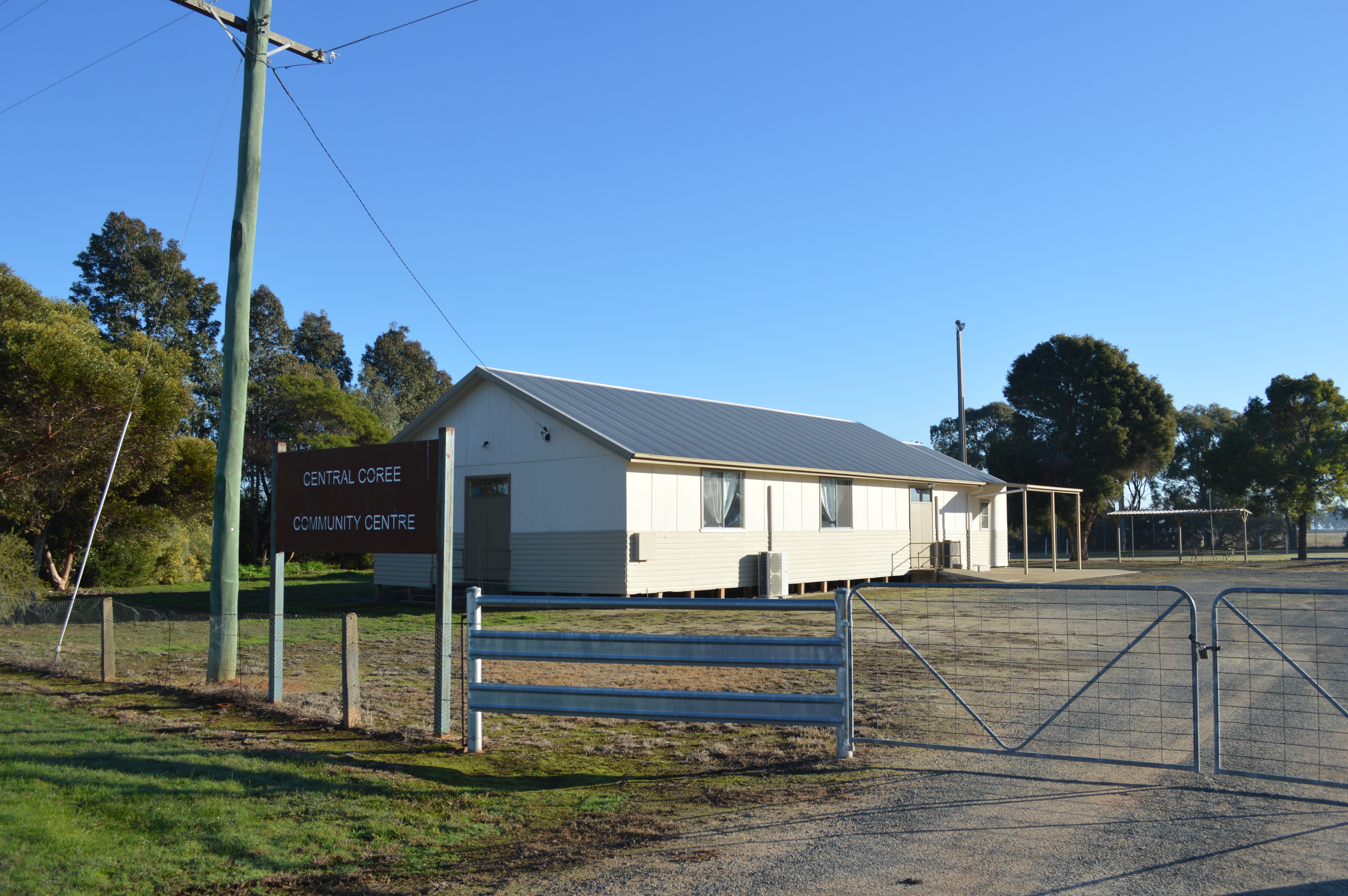
- Central Coree Community Centre at Logie Brae

- Coordinates: 35°28′33″S 145°34′41″E
- Country: Australia
- State: New South Wales
- LGA: Murrumbidgee Council
- Location: 647 km (402 mi) SW of Sydney; 311 km (193 mi) N of Melbourne; 190 km (120 mi) SW of Wagga Wagga; 23 km (14 mi) N of Finley

Government
  - State electorate: Albury
  - Federal division: Farrer

Population
  - Total: 80 (2016 census)
- Postcode: 2713

Logie Brae is a locality in the Riverina region of New South Wales, Australia.

== Description ==
Logie Brae is in the Murrumbidgee Council local government area, 647 kilometres (402 mi) south west of the state capital, Sydney and 311 kilometres (193 mi) from Melbourne.

At the 2016 census, Logie Brae had a population of 80.
