= Jerilderie Shire =

Former local government area in New South Wales, Australia

- Local government area
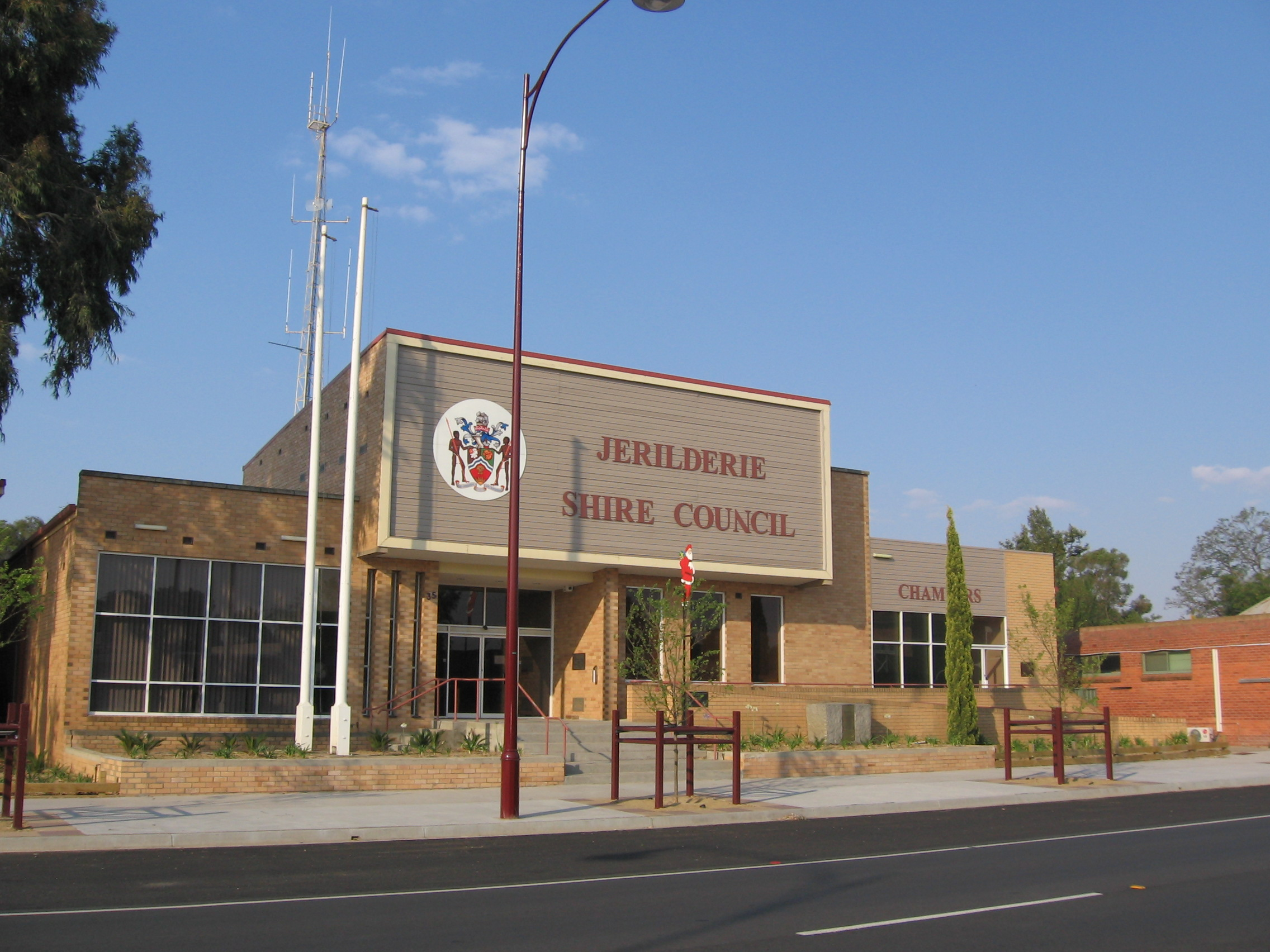
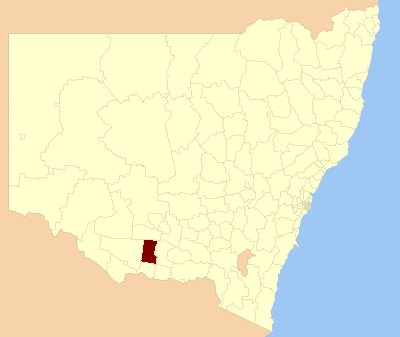
- Jerilderie Shire Council office and chambers. Location of Jerilderie Shire in New South Wales
- Coordinates: 35°21′S 145°44′E
- Country: Australia
- State: New South Wales
- Region: Murray
- Established: 1918
- Abolished: 2016
- Council seat: Jerilderie

Government
  - State electorate: Albury
  - Federal division: Farrer

Area
  - Total: 3,373 km^{2} (1,302 sq mi)

Population
  - Total: 1,526 (2012)
  - Density: 0.45242/km^{2} (1.1718/sq mi)
LGAs around Jerilderie Shire
Murrumbidgee	Murrumbidgee	Narrandera
Conargo	Jerilderie Shire	Urana
Conargo	Berrigan	Corowa

Jerilderie Shire was a local government area in the Murray region of southern New South Wales, Australia. The Shire was located adjacent to the Newell Highway. The Shire was declared in 1918 after the amalgamation of the former Municipality of Jerilderie (1889 – 1918) and Wunnamurra Shire (1906 – 1918). It was dissolved in 2016 after its amalgamation with Murrumbidgee Shire to create Murrumbidgee Council.

At the time of dissolution, Jerilderie Shire was the second smallest local government area in New South Wales, in terms of population.

The final mayor of Jerilderie Shire was Ruth McRae, an unaligned politician. The seat of the council was located in Jerilderie, the only significant town in the Shire.

== Amalgamation ==
A 2015 review of local government boundaries by the NSW Government Independent Pricing and Regulatory Tribunal recommended that the Jerilderie Shire merge adjoining councils. The government considered three proposals. The first proposal was a merger between parts of the Jerilderie Shire with the Murrumbidgee Shire to form a new council with an area of 4,924 square kilometres (1,901 sq mi) and support a population of approximately 3,000. The second proposal was a merger between the remaining parts of the Jerilderie Shire with the Berrigan Shire to form a new council with an area of 4,022 square kilometres (1,553 sq mi) and support a population of approximately 10,000. The Jerilderie Shire Council submitted an alternate proposal to the Minister for Local Government that the entire Jerilderie Shire amalgamate with the Murrumbidgee Shire.

Jerilderie Shire was dissolved on 12 May 2016 with the area, along with Murrumbidgee Shire, incorporated into the new Murrumbidgee Council.

== Composition and election method ==
At the time of dissolution, Jerilderie Shire Council was composed of seven councillors elected proportionally as one entire ward. All councillors were elected for a fixed four-year term of office. The mayor was elected by the councillors at the first meeting of the council. The final election was held on 8 September 2012.
