= Tuppal, New South Wales =

Tuppal
- Town
- Coordinates: 35°41′S 145°18′E
- Country: Australia
- State: New South Wales
- LGA: Edward River Council
- Location: 43 km (27 mi) from Deniliquin; 53 km (33 mi) from Tocumwal

Government
  - State electorate: Murray
  - Federal division: Farrer
- Elevation: 127 m (417 ft)

Population
  - Total: 19 (SAL 2021)
- Postcode: 2714
- County: Townsend

Tuppal is a rural locality in the central south part of the Riverina. It is situated by road, about 43 kilometres south east from Deniliquin and 53 kilometres north west from Tocumwal.
