= Billabong Creek =

River in Australia

Billabong Moulamein
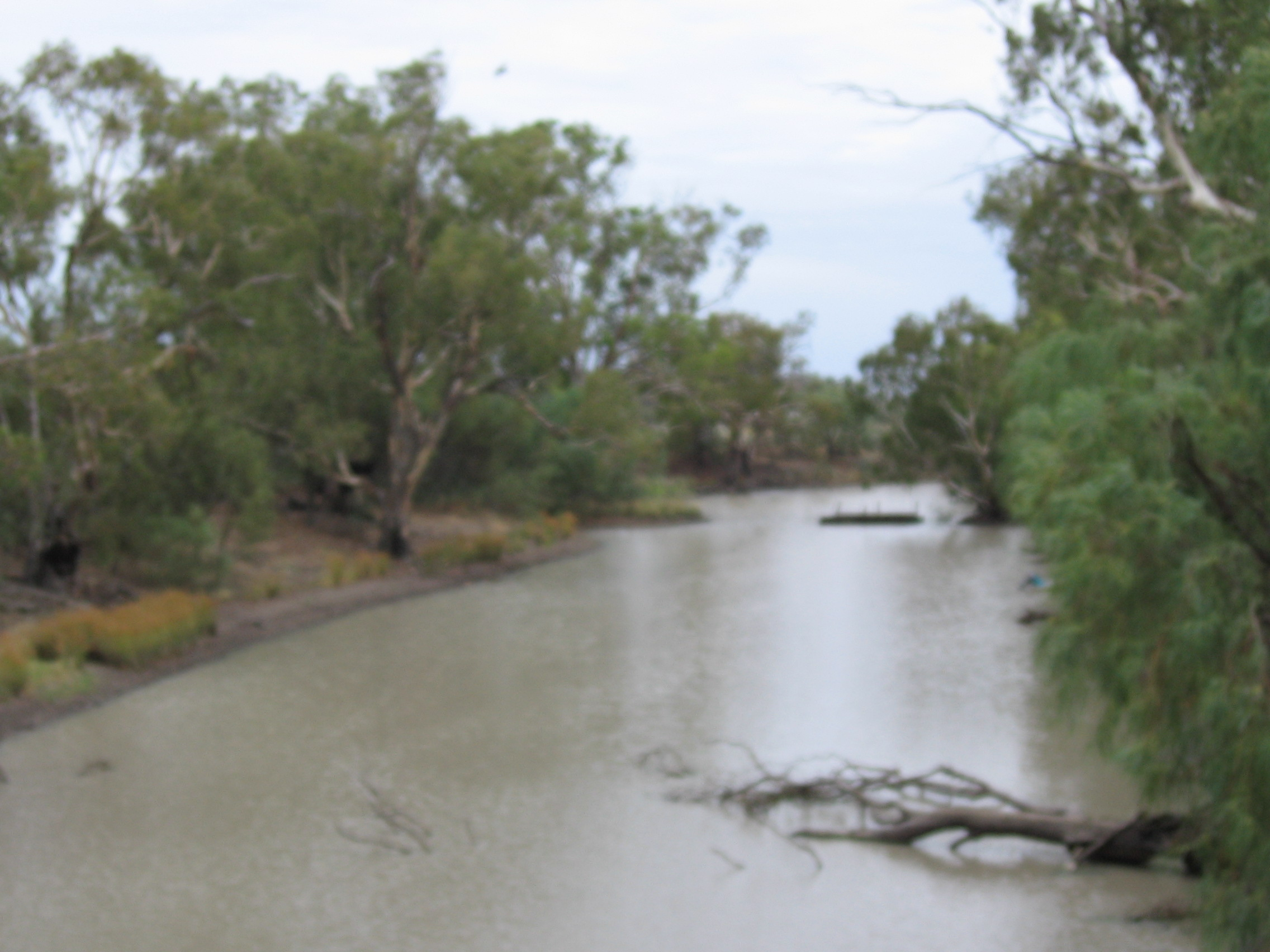
- Billabong Creek at Moulamein

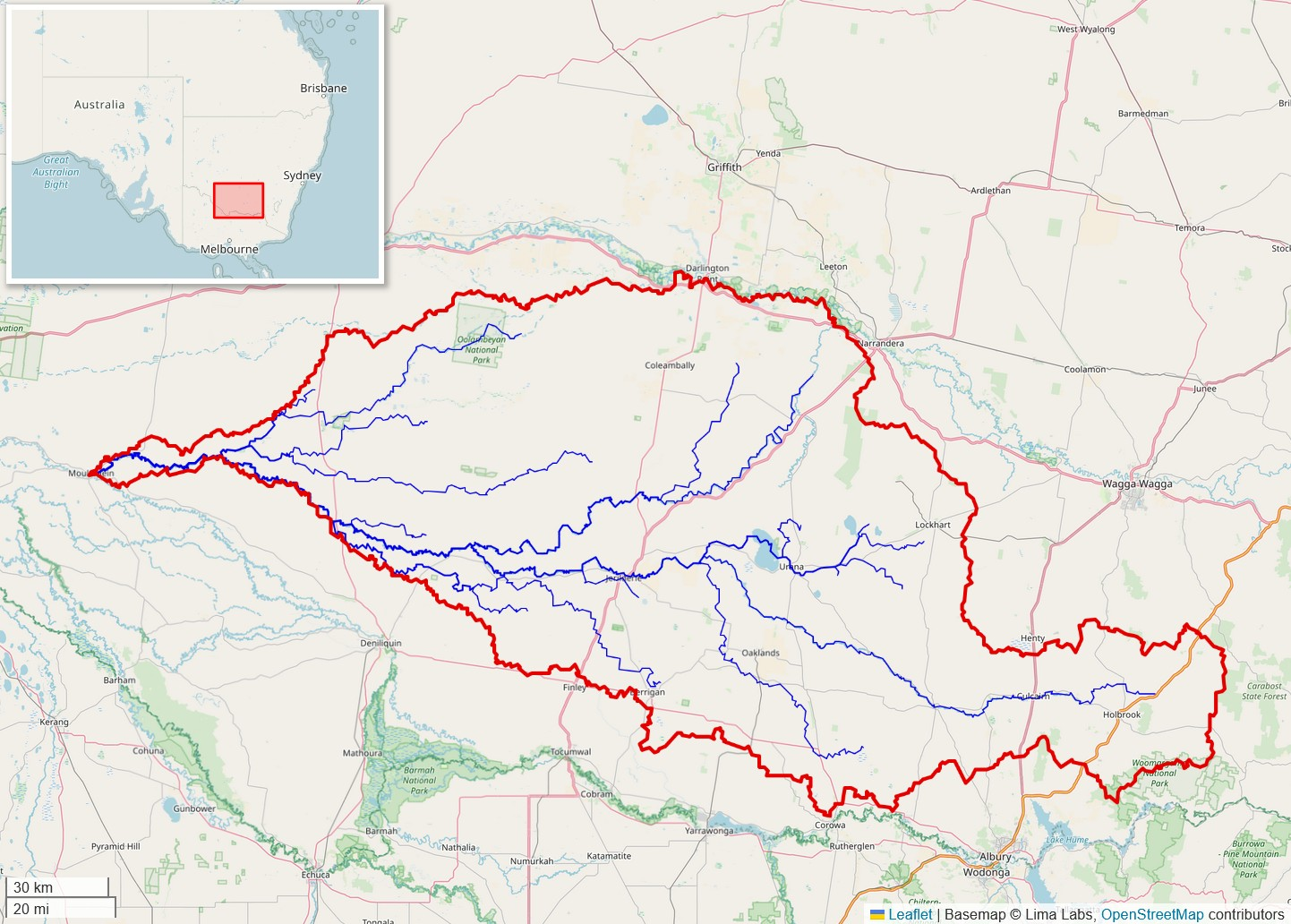
- Billabong Creek watershed (Interactive map)

- Location of the Billabong Creek mouth in New South Wales
- Etymology: Aboriginal: an effluent from a river, sometimes separated from it, sometimes being joined again at time of flood.

Location
- Country: Australia
- State: New South Wales
- Region: Riverina (IBRA)
- LGA: Federation Council
- Towns: Morven, Culcairn, Walbundrie, Rand, Jerilderie, Conargo, Wanganella, Moulamein

Physical characteristics
- Source confluence: Yarra Yarra Creek and Little Billabong Creek
  - location: near Holbrook
  - elevation: 322 m (1,056 ft)
- Mouth: confluence with the Edward River
  - location: Moulamein
  - coordinates: 35°5′32″S 144°2′0″E
  - elevation: 70 m (230 ft)
- Length: 320 km (200 mi)
- Basin size: 791 km^{2} (305 sq mi)

Basin features
- River system: Murray catchment, Murray-Darling basin

The Billabong Creek, a partly perennial stream of the Murray River catchment within the Murray-Darling basin, is located in the Riverina region of New South Wales, Australia.

At 320 kilometres (200 mi) (with some estimates ranging up to 596 kilometres (370 mi)), Billabong Creek is believed to be the longest creek in the world.

== Course and features ==
Formed by the confluence of the Yarra Yarra Creek and Little Billabong Creek, Billabong Creek rises on the Great Dividing Range, north of Holbrook, and flows generally west, northwest, and west, joined by sixteen minor tributaries before reaching its confluence with the Edward River, at Moulamein. The creek descends 252 metres (827 ft) over its 320-kilometre (200 mi) course.

From source to mouth, the creek passes through the towns of Morven, Culcairn, Walbundrie, Rand, Jerilderie, Conargo, Wanganella, and Moulamein.

The creek has a catchment area of 791 square kilometres (305 sq mi) and is the main present drainage line between the Murray and the Murrumbidgee rivers. Alluvial deposits from the system fill a long narrow paleovalley that extends for about 150 kilometres (93 mi) from Garryowen (near Holbrook) to Walla Walla.

== Gallery ==
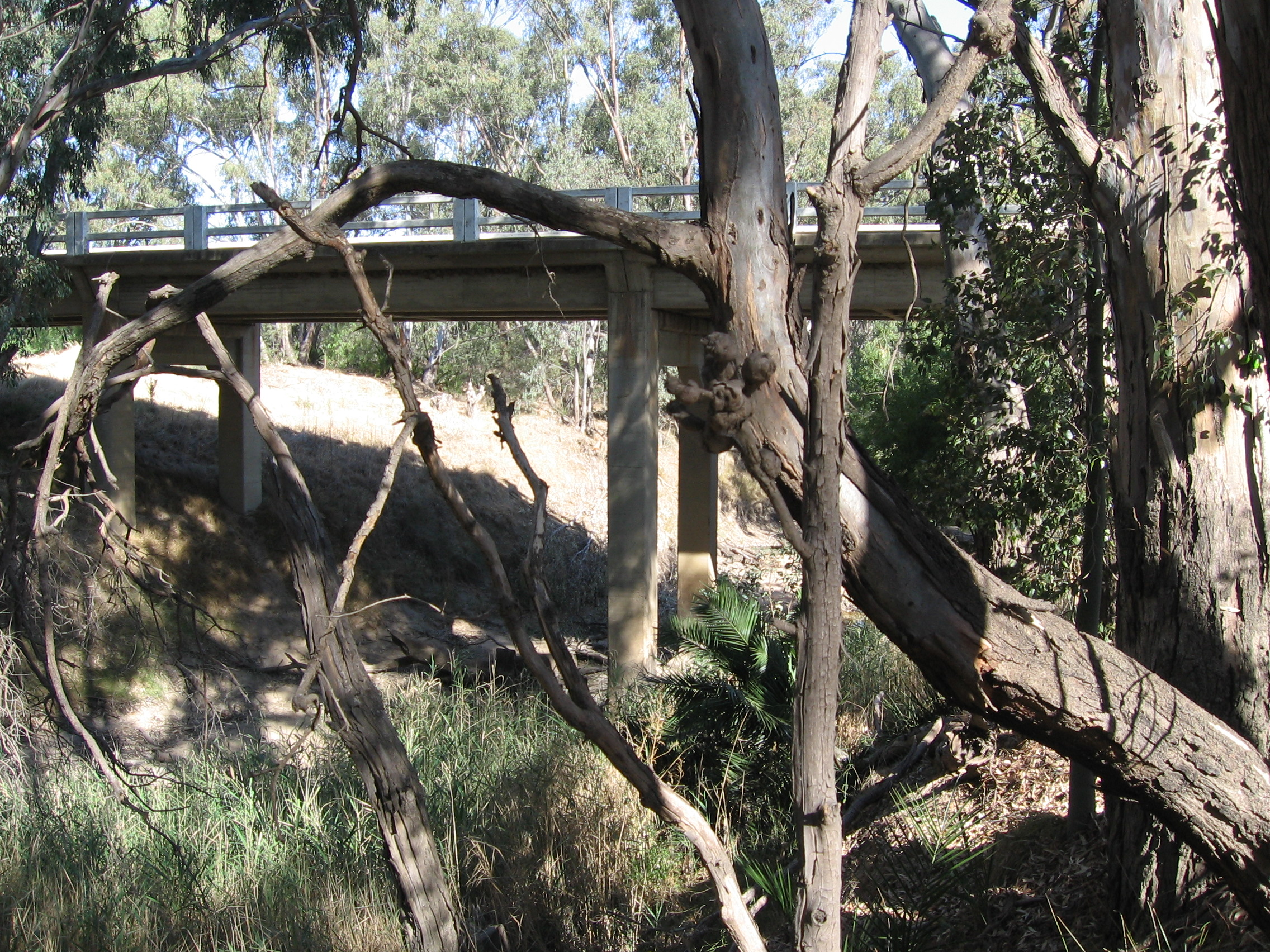
Billabong Creek at Rand

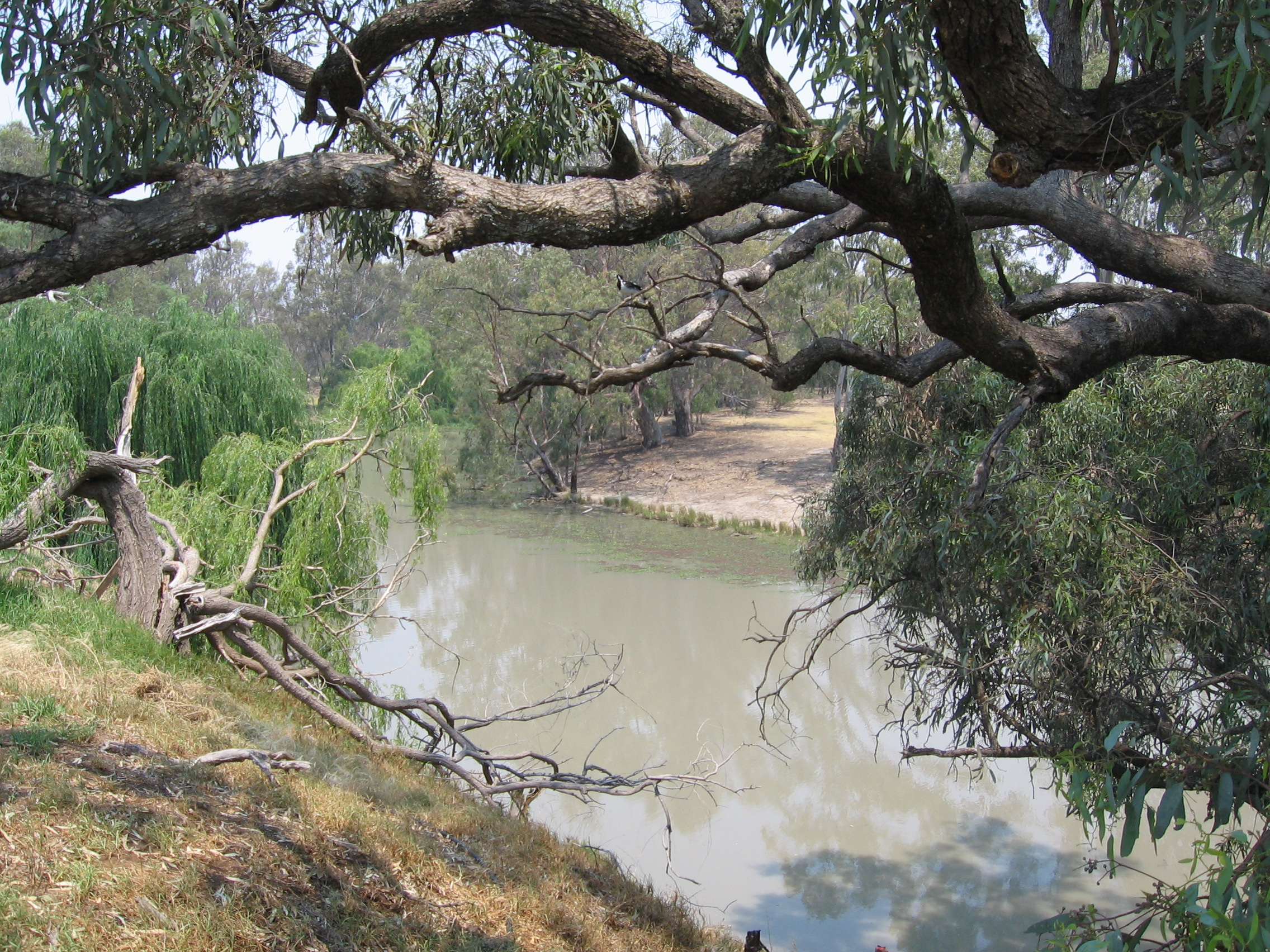
Billabong Creek at Wanganella

== See also ==
- List of rivers of New South Wales (A-K)
- Rivers of New South Wales
