= Murrumbidgee Shire =

Former local government area in New South Wales, Australia

- Local government area
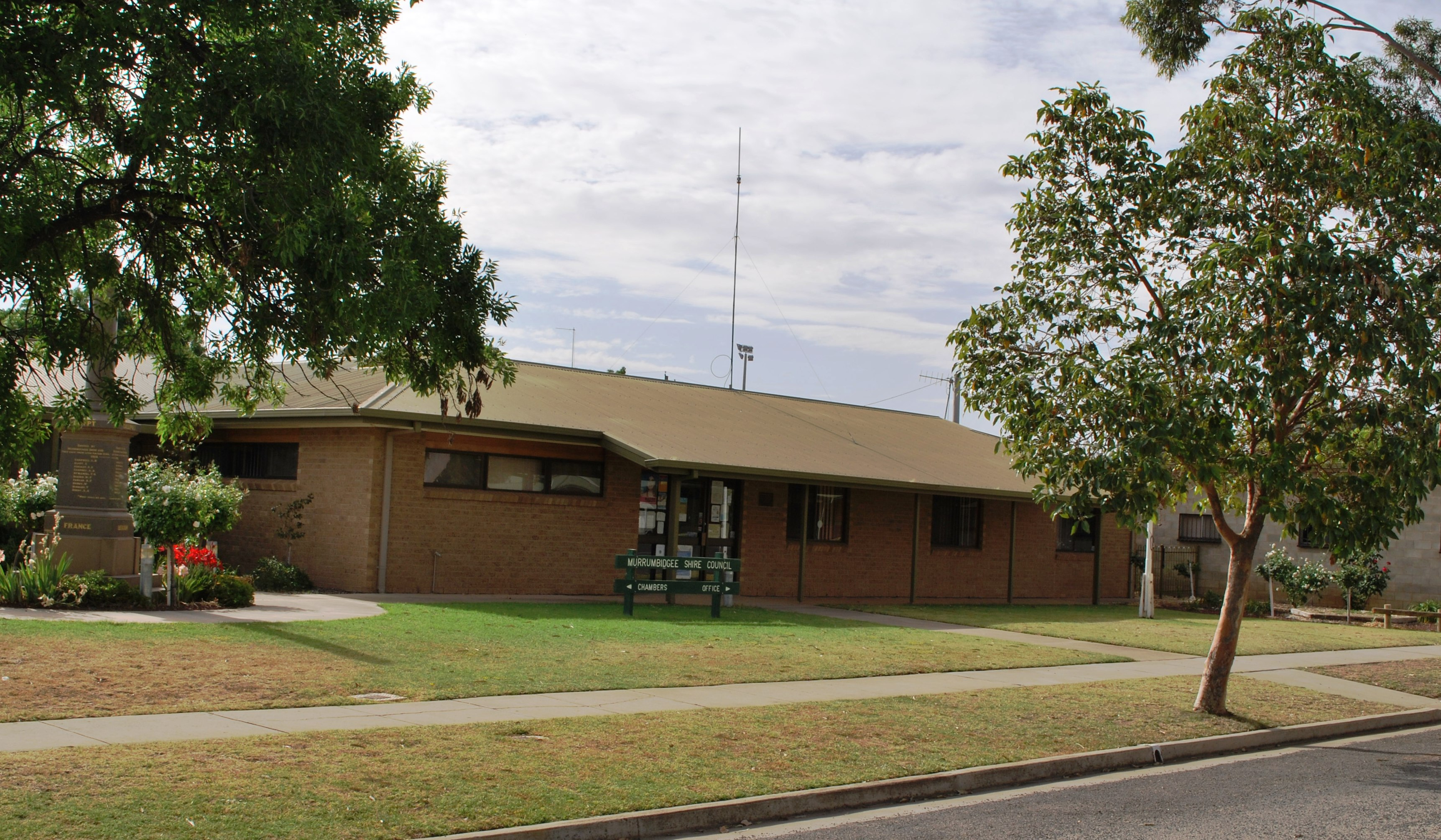
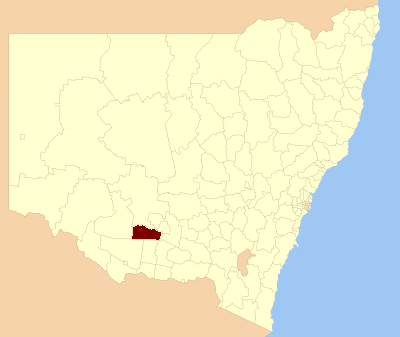
- Shire office and chambers, in Darlington Point. Location within New South Wales
- Coordinates: 34°48′S 145°53′E
- Country: Australia
- State: New South Wales
- Region: Riverina
- Abolished: 2016
- Council seat: Darlington Point

Government
  - State electorate: Murray
  - Federal division: Riverina

Area
  - Total: 3,508 km^{2} (1,354 sq mi)

Population
  - Total: 2,415 (2012)
  - Density: 0.68843/km^{2} (1.7830/sq mi)
LGAs around Murrumbidgee Shire
Carrathool	Griffith	Leeton
Hay	Murrumbidgee Shire	Narrandera
Conargo	Jerilderie	Urana

Murrumbidgee Shire was a local government area in the Riverina region of south western New South Wales, Australia. The Shire was located adjacent to the Murrumbidgee River and the Newell Highway. It was replaced by the Murrumbidgee Council in 2016.

The two main administrative centres for the Murrumbidgee Shire were Coleambally and Darlington Point. It also contained the small town of Waddi.

== Amalgamation ==
A 2015 review of local government boundaries by the NSW Government Independent Pricing and Regulatory Tribunal recommended that the Murrumbidgee Shire merge with parts of the Jerilderie Shire to form a new council with an area of 4,924 square kilometres (1,901 sq mi) and support a population of approximately 3,000. The Jerilderie Shire Council submitted an alternate proposal to the Minister for Local Government that the entire Jerilderie Shire be amalgamated with the Murrumbidgee Shire.

Murrumbidgee Shire was dissolved on 12 May 2016 with the area, along with Jerilderie Shire, incorporated into the new Murrumbidgee Council.

== Council ==
=== Former composition and election method ===
At the time of dissolution, Murrumbidgee Shire Council was composed of six councillors elected proportionally in two separate wards, each electing three councillors. All councillors were elected for a fixed four-year term of office. The mayor was elected by the councillors at the first meeting of the council. The final election was held on 8 September 2012. In East Ward, there were only three candidates, being those below, nominated for election. There being no additional candidates, the election for East Ward was uncontested. An election was held in the North Ward.
