= Mayrung, New South Wales =

Coordinates: 35°27′55″S 145°17′05″E

Mayrung
- Town
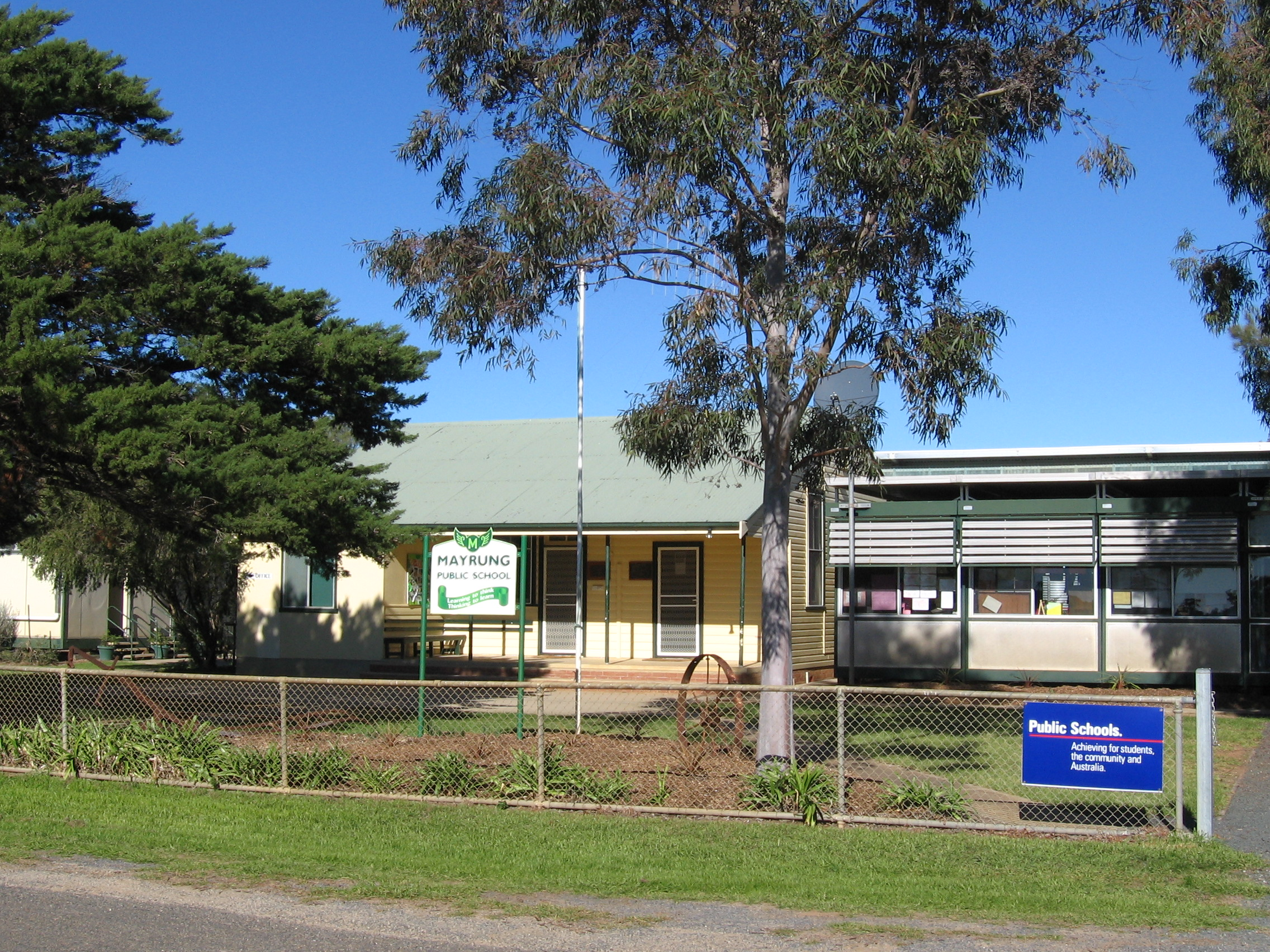
- Mayrung Public School
- Country: Australia
- State: New South Wales
- LGA: Edward River Council
- Location: 45 km (28 mi) from Pretty Pine; 35 km (22 mi) from Deniliquin

Government
  - State electorate: Murray
  - Federal division: Farrer

Population
  - Total: 171 (SAL 2021)
- Postcode: 2710
- County: Townsend

Mayrung is a community in the central part of the Riverina about 45 kilometres east of Pretty Pine and 35 kilometres north-east of Deniliquin.

The Wiradjuri Aborigines, who inhabited the district prior to white settlement, called it 'Carawatha', which is thought to mean 'place of pines'. Wamba Wamba speakers who still inhabit the district call the distinctive sand hill Murray Pines 'marrung'. The place name 'Mayrung' is clearly an Anglicisation of this Wamba Wamba word.

Mayrung is situated within the Berriquin Irrigation Area which supplies wool, wheat, fat lambs, rice, dairy products, vegetables, cereals, cattle and pigs.[2]
