= Blighty, New South Wales =

Blighty New South Wales
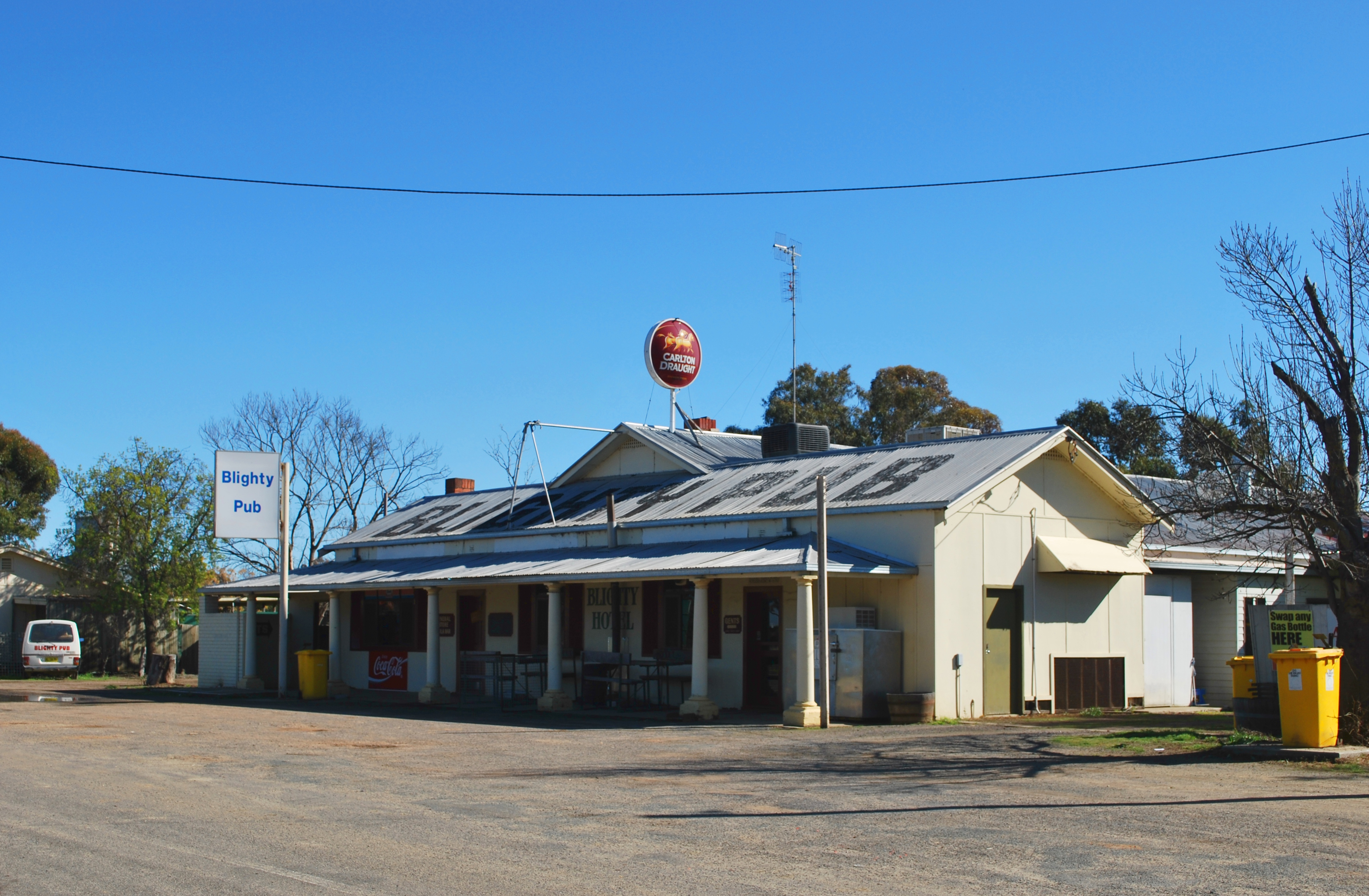
- The pub at Blighty.

- Coordinates: 35°35′0″S 145°21′0″E
- Population: 3 (2016 census)
- Location: 693 km (431 mi) from Sydney; 168 km (104 mi) from Albury; 32 km (20 mi) from Deniliquin; 25 km (16 mi) from Finley
- LGA(s): Edward River Council
- County: Townsend
- State electorate(s): Murray
- Federal division(s): Farrer

Blighty is a small town in the Riverina region of New South Wales, Australia. The town lies on the Riverina Highway between the towns of Finley and Deniliquin. It is located in the Edward River Council local government area. At the 2011 census, Blighty and the surrounding area had a population of 396.

Blighty Post Office opened on 16 February 1926 and closed in 1932. It reopened in 1956 and closed again in 1991.

Blighty consists of a hotel, a school and an Australian rules football ground. The town has a team competing in the Picola & District Football League.

The land around Blighty is mainly irrigated and used to produce rice and other grains. Blighty is also a major receival centre for the Ricegrowers Co-Operative Limited with a number of sheds capable of storing 28,000 tonnes (31,000 short tons) of grain.

== See also ==
- Blighty Football Club
