= Booroorban =

- Town
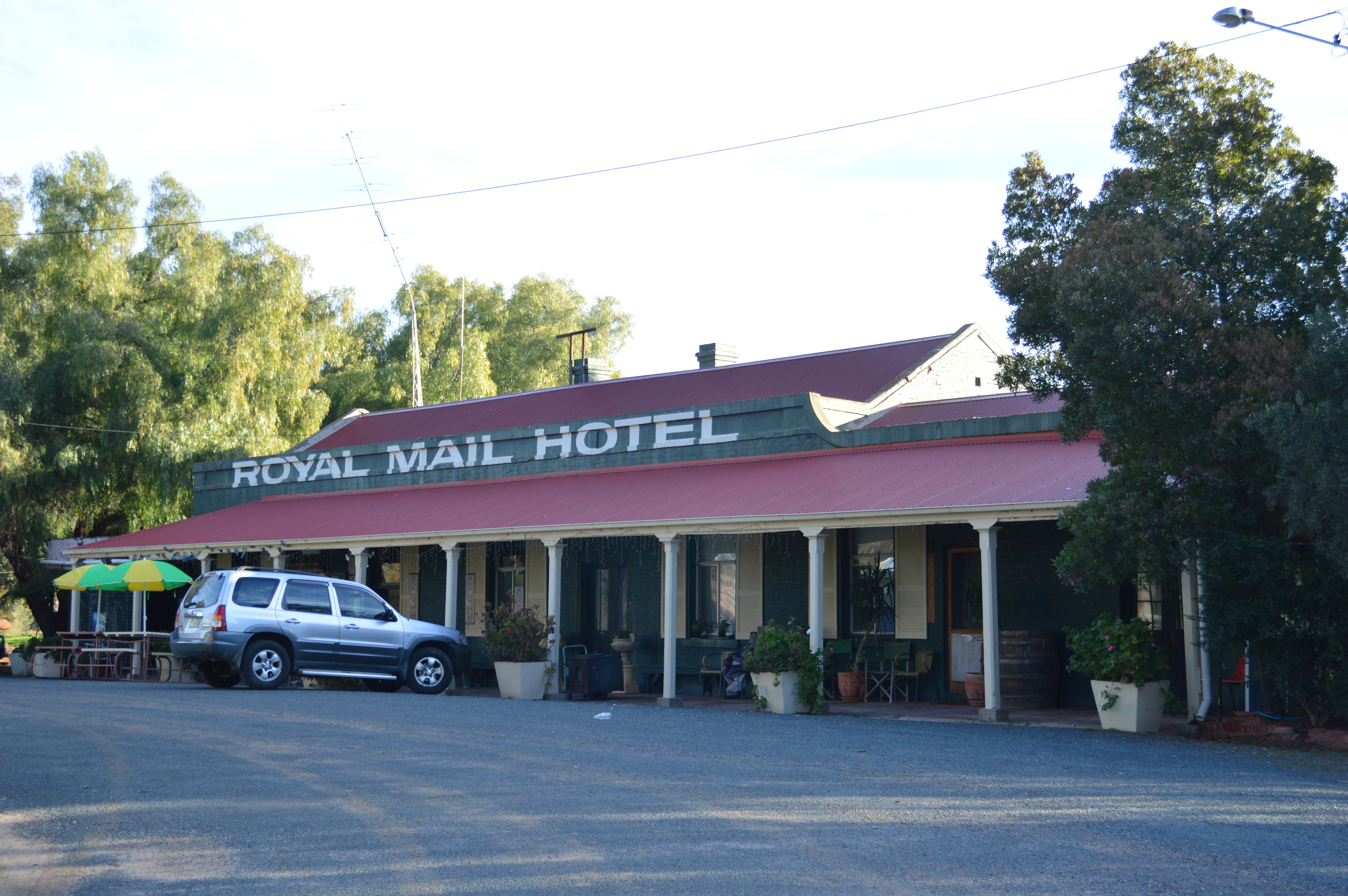
- Royal Mail Hotel

- Coordinates: 34°56′S 144°46′E
- Country: Australia
- State: New South Wales
- LGA: Edward River Council
- Location: 765 km (475 mi) from Sydney; 199 km (124 mi) from Griffith; 47 km (29 mi) from Hay; 33 km (21 mi) from Wanganella

Government
  - State electorate: Murray
  - Federal division: Farrer

Population
  - Total: 33 (2016 census)
- County: Townsend

Booroorban is a village in the central part of the Riverina. It is in the Edward River Council local government area and on the Cobb Highway between Hay and Deniliquin, around 769 kilometres (478 mi) south west of the state capital, Sydney. At the 2016 census, Booroorban had a population of 33.

The community sits alongside the Booroorban State Forest. Facilities include a pub—the Royal Mail Hotel—and a public hall.

== History ==
The site of Booroorban was on a stock-route supplying the Victorian market that developed in the 1850s, located on the Old Man Plain between the Murrumbidgee River and Billabong Creek. The locality, which became known as Pine Ridge, was where the track crossed Box Creek (about mid-way between modern-day Hay and Wanganella).

=== Pine Ridge ===
During 1859 Henry Shiell, the police magistrate for the district based at Lang's Crossing Place (later Hay), initiated a public subscription to fund the sinking of a well at Pine Ridge to provide water for travellers crossing the Old Man Plain. Messrs. Marshall and Waring from Deniliquin were engaged to sink the well, work on which commenced in September 1859.

By late 1860 a public house was constructed near the well by Messrs. Roberts and Roby, businessmen from Deniliquin, which became known as the Pine Ridge Inn (or Hotel). With the establishment of a coach route between Deniliquin and Hay the public-house at Pine Ridge became a coach change-station for horses. Early recorded publicans were Chapman (1862) and William Kiely (May 1864). By November 1864 Samuel Porter had purchased the Pine Ridge Hotel. He carried out extensive repairs to the establishment which had "for some time been in a most dilapidated state" and constructed a dam on nearby Box Creek. In July 1866 Porter was granted a license for the Pine Ridge Hotel.

=== Boorboorban village ===
In December 1867 Crown Lands were declared to be "set apart as the site for the Village of Booroorban". Until at least the late 1870s, despite the official naming of Booroorban village, the locality was more often referred to as Pine Ridge (or Pineridge) in the Hay newspaper, the Riverine Grazier.

During 1868 Porter built a new hotel at Booroorban which he named the Royal Mail. The publican's license of the older Pine Ridge Hotel was transferred to John Edmondson in 1868.

Booroorban Post Office opened on 16 September 1881 and closed in 1986.
