= Murrumbidgee Council =

- Local government area
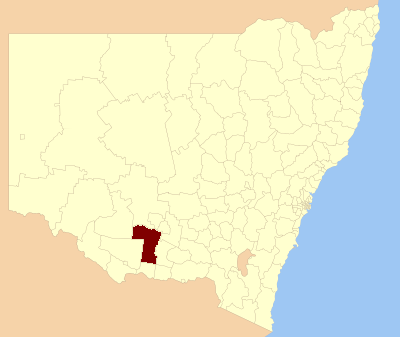
- Location in New South Wales

- Interactive map of Murrumbidgee Council
- Coordinates: 35°9′S 145°46′E
- Country: Australia
- State: New South Wales
- Region: Riverina
- Established: 12 May 2016

Government
  - Mayor: Ruth McRae
  - State electorate: Murray
  - Federal division: Farrer

Area
  - Total: 6,880 km^{2} (2,660 sq mi)

Population
  - Totals: 3,826 (2016 census); 3,961 (2018 est.)
  - Density: 0.5561/km^{2} (1.4403/sq mi)
- Website: Murrumbidgee Council
LGAs around Murrumbidgee Council
Carrathool	Carrathool, Griffith	Leeton
Hay, Edward River	Murrumbidgee Council	Narrandera, Federation
Edward River	Berrigan	Federation

Murrumbidgee Council is a local government area in the Riverina region of New South Wales, Australia. This area was formed in 2016 from the merger of the Murrumbidgee Shire and the Jerilderie Shire.

The combined area comprises 6,880 square kilometres (2,660 sq mi) and covers the urban areas of Coleambally, Darlington Point and Jerilderie and the surrounding cropping and pastoral areas. At the time of its establishment, the estimated population of the area was 4,047.

The inaugural mayor of Murrumbidgee Council is former Jerilderie Shire councillor Ruth McRae, elected on 21 September 2017. Cr McRae was elected as mayor for the second term on 24 September 2019.

== Council ==
Murrumbidgee Council has nine councillors, with three councillors elected proportionally from three wards – Jerilderie, Murrumbidgee and Murrumbidgee East. All councillors are elected for a fixed four-year term of office.

== Election results ==
=== 2024 ===
2024 New South Wales local elections: Murrumbidgee
Party	Votes	%	Swing	Seats	Change
Independents					
Formal votes					
Informal votes					
Total					
Registered voters / turnout					

== Demographics ==
Selected historical census data for Murrumbidgee Council local government area
Census year		2001	2006	2011	2016
Population	Estimated residents on census night	2,502	▲2,503	▼2,261	▲3,836
Population	LGA rank in terms of size within New South Wales			117th	117th
Population	% of New South Wales population	0.04%	0.04%	▼0.03%	▲0.05%
Population	% of Australian population	0.01%	0.01%	0.01%	▲0.02%
Cultural and language diversity					
Ancestry, top responses	Australian			36.4%	▼35.0%
Ancestry, top responses	English			27.4%	▲27.6%
Ancestry, top responses	Irish			9.6%	▼9.3%
Ancestry, top responses	Scottish			7.7%	▲7.8%
Ancestry, top responses	Italian			n/c	▲3.2%
Language, top responses (other than English)	Italian	0.3%	▲0.4%	▲0.5%	▼0.4%
Language, top responses (other than English)	Spanish	n/c	n/c	n/c	▲0.3%
Language, top responses (other than English)	Arabic	n/c	n/c	n/c	▲0.3%
Language, top responses (other than English)	Tagalog	0.2%	▼ n/c	▲0.5%	▼0.3%
Language, top responses (other than English)	Mandarin	n/c	n/c	n/c	▲0.3%
Religious affiliation					
Religious affiliation, top responses	Catholic	28.9%	▼28.0%	▲28.3%	▲28.9%
Religious affiliation, top responses	Anglican	33.0%	▼32.8%	▼29.9%	▼22.3%
Religious affiliation, top responses	No Religion, so described	9.2%	▼8.7%	▲13.6%	▲18.7%
Religious affiliation, top responses	Not stated	n/c	n/c	n/c	▲12.1%
Religious affiliation, top responses	Uniting Church	11.2%	▼9.8%	▼8.2%	▲8.5%
Median weekly incomes					
Personal income	Median weekly personal income		A$467	A$508	A$659
Personal income	% of Australian median income		100.2%	▼88.0%	▲99.5%
Family income	Median weekly family income		A$1,047	A$1,109	A$1,461
Family income	% of Australian median income		89.4%	▼74.9%	▲84.3%
Household income	Median weekly household income		A$861	A$894	A$1,197
Household income	% of Australian median income		83.8%	▼72.4%	▲83.2%

== Heritage listings ==
The Murrumbidgee Council has a number of heritage-listed sites, including:

- Darlington Point, Warangesda: Warangesda Aboriginal Mission
- Jerilderie, Nowranie Street: Jerilderie railway station

== See also ==
- Local government areas of New South Wales
