= Berrigan Shire =

- Local government area
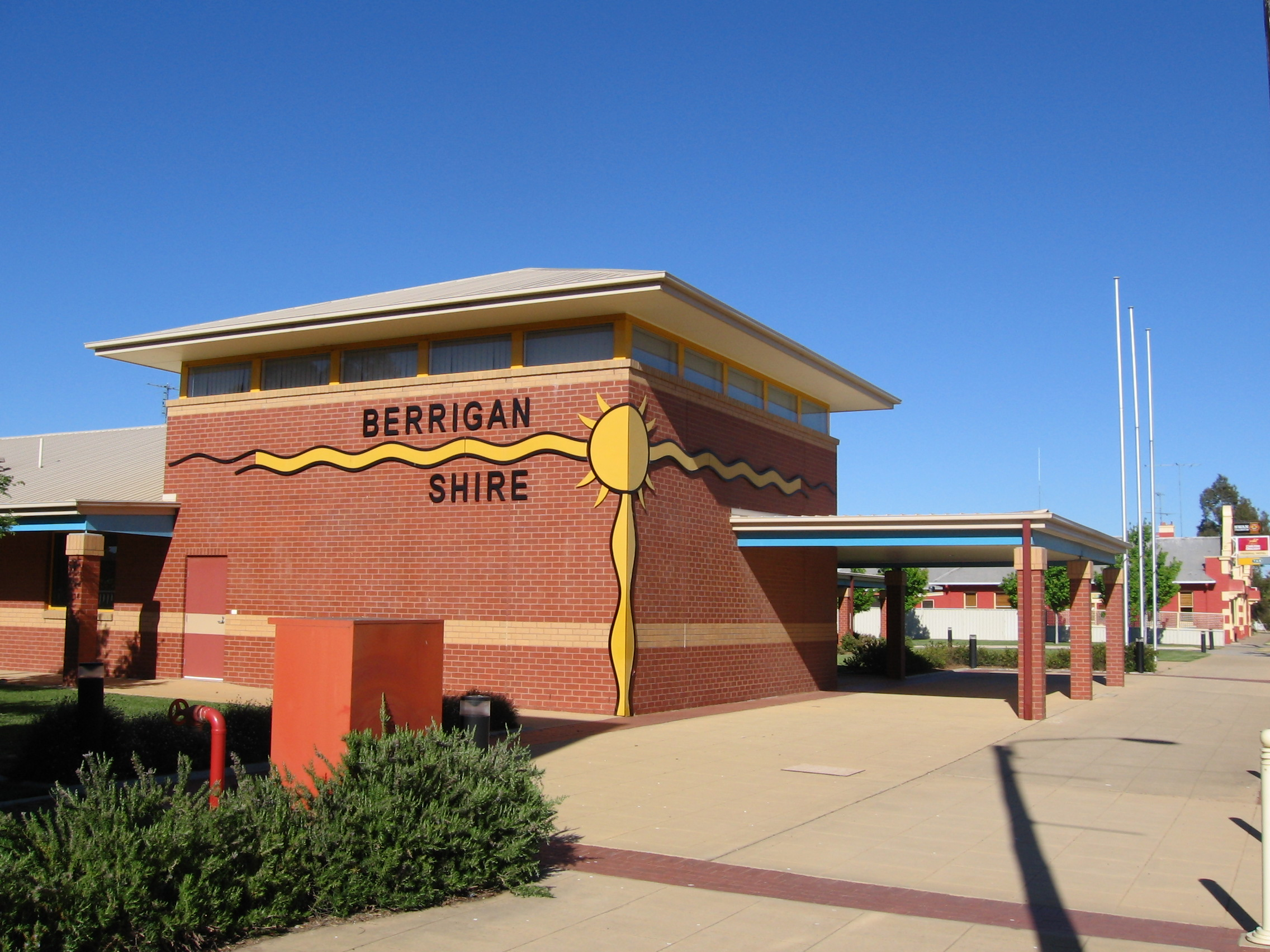
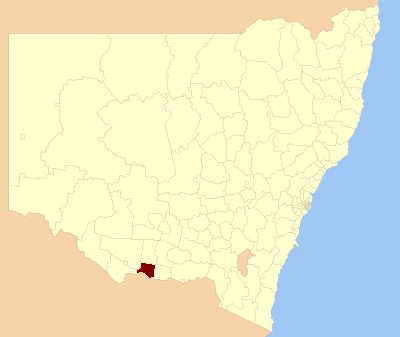
- Berrigan Shire Office, Chanter Street, Berrigan. Location in New South Wales

- Interactive map of Berrigan Shire
- Coordinates: 35°38′S 145°48′E
- Country: Australia
- State: New South Wales
- Region: Riverina
- Established: 1906
- Council seat: Berrigan

Government
  - Mayor: Julia Cornwell-McKean (Unaligned)
  - State electorate: Murray
  - Federal division: Farrer

Area
  - Total: 2,066 km^{2} (798 sq mi)

Population
  - Totals: 8,665 (2021 census); 8,707 (2018 est.)
  - Density: 4.1941/km^{2} (10.863/sq mi)
- Website: Berrigan Shire
LGAs around Berrigan Shire
Edward River	Murrumbidgee	Federation
Murray River	Berrigan Shire	Federation
Moira (Vic)	Moira (Vic)	Moira (Vic)

Berrigan Shire is a local government area in the southern Riverina region of New South Wales, Australia. The Shire lies on the New South Wales State border with Victoria formed by the Murray River. The Shire is adjacent to the Newell and Riverina Highways. The Shire is a mainly agricultural region, with dairying, cattle raising, woolgrowing and cropping the main activities. The vast majority of the Shire is irrigated. Tourism is another major activity, concentrated on the river towns of Tocumwal and Barooga.

The mayor of Berrigan Shire is Julia Cornwell-McKean, an unaligned politician.

== Towns and localities ==
Towns in the shire are:

- Berrigan, where the Council office is based
- Finley
- Tocumwal, and
- Barooga.

== Demographics ==
Selected historical census data for Berrigan Shire local government area
Census year		2011	2016
Population	Estimated residents on census night	8,066	▲8,462
Population	LGA rank in terms of size within New South Wales		97th
Population	% of New South Wales population		
Population	% of Australian population		
Cultural and language diversity			
Ancestry, top responses	English		
Ancestry, top responses	Australian		
Ancestry, top responses	Italian		
Ancestry, top responses	Chinese		
Ancestry, top responses	Irish		
Language, top responses (other than English)	Italian		
Language, top responses (other than English)	Mandarin		
Language, top responses (other than English)	Cantonese		
Language, top responses (other than English)	Korean		
Language, top responses (other than English)	Greek		
Religious affiliation			
Religious affiliation, top responses	Catholic		
Religious affiliation, top responses	No religion		
Religious affiliation, top responses	Anglican		
Religious affiliation, top responses	Eastern Orthodox		
Religious affiliation, top responses	Buddhism		
Median weekly incomes			
Personal income	Median weekly personal income	A$	
Personal income	% of Australian median income		
Family income	Median weekly family income		
Family income	% of Australian median income		
Household income	Median weekly household income		
Household income	% of Australian median income		

== Proposed amalgamation ==
A 2015 review of local government boundaries by the NSW Government Independent Pricing and Regulatory Tribunal recommended that the Berrigan Council merge with parts of the Jerilderie Shire to form a new council with an area of 4,022 square kilometres (1,553 sq mi) and support a population of approximately 10,000. The Jerilderie Shire Council submitted an alternate proposal to the Minister for Local Government that the entire Jerilderie Shire amalgamate with the Murrumbidgee Shire.

The NSW Government decided in May 2016 not to proceed with the proposed amalgamation.

== Council ==
=== Current composition and election method ===
Berrigan Shire Council is composed of eight councillors elected proportionally as a single ward. All councillors are elected for a fixed four-year term of office. The mayor is elected by the councillors at the first meeting of the council. The most recent election was held on 14 September 2024, and the makeup of the council is as follows:

Party	Councillors
Independents and Unaligned	7
Total	7

The current Council, elected in 2024, is:

Councillor	Party	Notes
Renee Brooker	Unaligned	
Julia Cornwell-McKean	Unaligned	
Matthew Hannan	Unaligned	
Catherine Healy	Unaligned	
Katie Ngatokoa	Independent	
Renee Paine	Independent	
John Stringer	Independent	
Vacant		

== Election results ==
=== 2024 ===
2024 New South Wales local elections: Berrigan
Party	Candidate	Votes	%	±%
Independent	Matthew Hannan (elected)	unopposed		
Independent	Catherine Healy (elected)	unopposed		
Independent	Julia Cornwell McKean (elected)	unopposed		
Independent	Renee Brooker (elected)	unopposed		
Independent	Renee Paine (elected)	unopposed		
Independent	John Stringer (elected)	unopposed		
Independent	Katie Ngatokoa (elected)	unopposed		
Registered electors				

A by-election will be held to fill the remaining eighth seat, with only several candidates nominating for the election.

=== 2021 ===
2021 New South Wales local elections: Berrigan
Party	Candidate	Votes	%	±%
Independent	Matthew Hannan (elected)	833	17.6	
Independent	Carly Marriott (elected)	654	13.9	
Independent	Sarah McNaught (elected)	610	12.9	
Independent	Edward (Ted) Hatty (elected)	488	10.3	
Independent	John Taylor (elected)	347	7.4	
Independent	Roger Reynoldson (elected)	313	6.6	
Independent	Julia Cornwell McKean (elected)	302	6.4	
Independent	Renee Paine (elected)	271	5.7	
Independent	Marcus Fry	195	4.1	
Independent	Mandy Bonat	185	3.9	
Independent	Clare Allan	182	3.9	
Independent	Daryll Morris	172	3.6	
Independent	Ross Bodey	168	3.6	
Total formal votes		4,720	95.0	
Informal votes		249	5.0	
Turnout		4,969	80.5	

=== 2012 ===
2012 New South Wales local elections: Berrigan
Party	Candidate	Votes	%	±%
Independent	1. Colin Jones (elected); 2. Denis Glanville (elected)	937	22.6	
Independent	John Bruce (elected)	828	20.0	−1.6
Independent	Matt Hannan (elected)	479	11.6	+1.3
Independent	Andrea O'Neill (elected)	421	10.2	+10.2
Independent	Daryll Morris (elected)	383	9.2	+9.2
Independent	Brian Hill (elected)	355	8.6	+1.2
Independent	Bernard Curtin (elected)	351	8.5	+0.7
Independent	Gary Mexted	252	6.1	+6.1
Independent	Liz McLaurin	135	3.3	−1.8
Turnout			79.4	
