= Pretty Pine, New South Wales =

Pretty Pine New South Wales
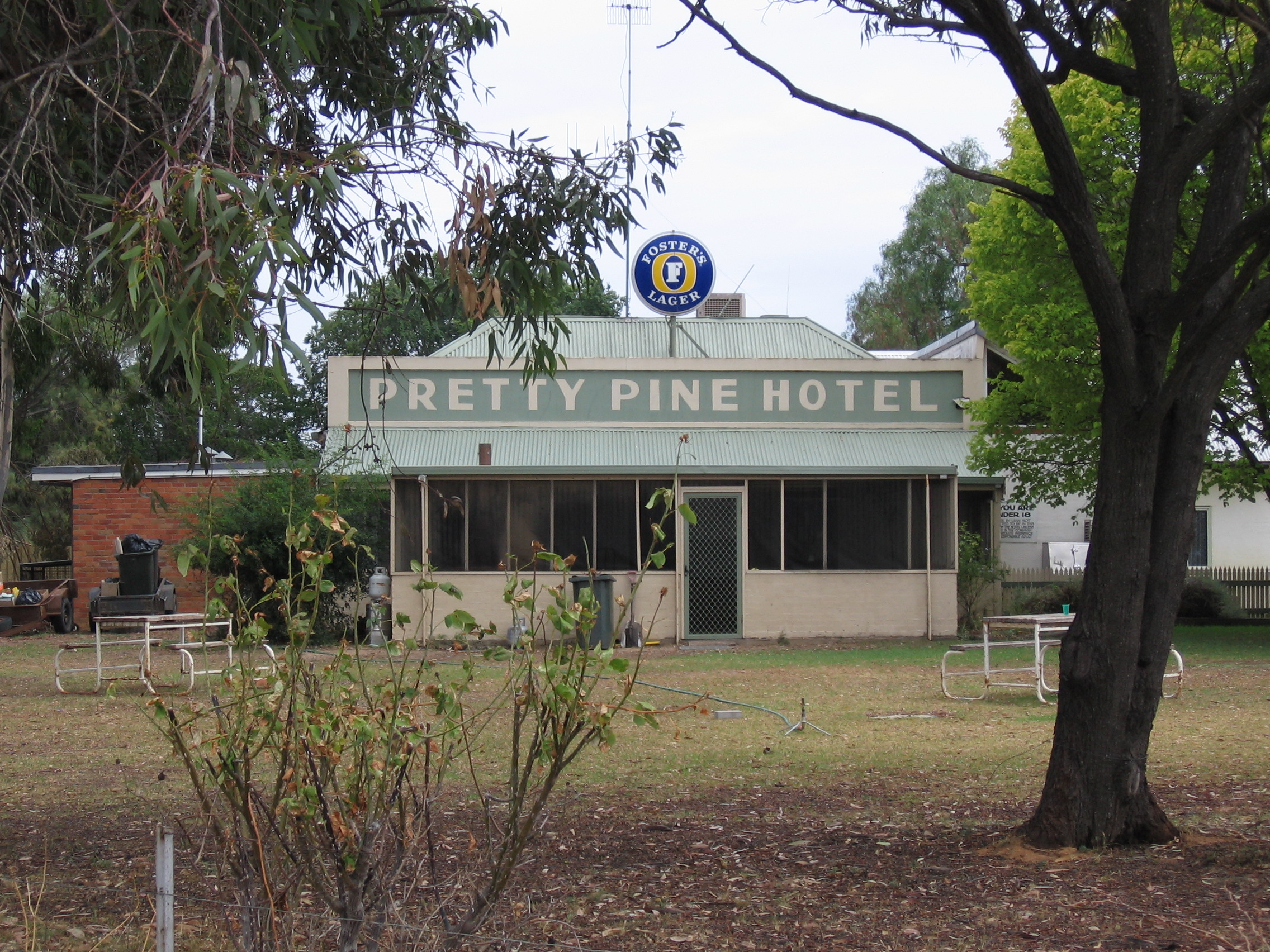
- The Pretty Pine Hotel

- Coordinates: 35°25′S 144°52′E
- Population: 59 (SAL 2021)
- Postcode(s): 2710
- Location: 17 km (11 mi) from Wanganella; 18 km (11 mi) from Deniliquin
- LGA(s): Edward River Council
- County: Townsend
- State electorate(s): Murray
- Federal division(s): Farrer

Pretty Pine is a community in the central part of the Riverina and situated about 17 kilometres south of Wanganella and 18 kilometres north-west of Deniliquin.

== History ==
=== The Pretty Pine Hotel ===
In September 1875 it was reported that a new hotel was being constructed for Robert Holloway at 'Pretty Pine', on the road between Deniliquin and Wanganella. Pretty Pine was a locality eleven miles (18 km) north-west of Deniliquin, at the junction of the Moulamein and Wanganella roads, named after "a very handsome specimen of what is commonly known here as the colonial pine" at the location. Holloway was well known in the Riverina district. He was the publican of the Carriers' Arms Hotel at Deniliquin and had previously been a coach-driver for Cobb and Co. By December 1875 he had obtained a transfer of his license to his new public-house, named the Pretty Pine Hotel. In May 1876 a horse-racing meeting was held at Pretty Pine celebrating the Queen's Birthday, hosted by the local publican, Bob Holloway.

Robert Holloway died in late July 1878 on a visit to 'Baalpool' station near Moulamein. The cause of his death was recorded as "aneurism of the aorta". Holloway had been in failing health "for a long time previously". After his death Holloway's widow, Anastasia, took over the license of the Pretty Pine Hotel.

In November 1879 213 acres of Crown land surrounding the Pretty Pine Hotel was set aside as a site for the village of Dahwilly and adjoining suburban lands. 'Dahwilly' was the parish name where the hotel was located.

In 1880 the widow Anastasia Holloway was married to Matthew Hole, a former coach-driver for Cobb and Co. In September 1881 the publicans' license for the Pretty Pine Hotel was transferred to Matthew Hole.

=== Murder ===
On 11 October 1883 the body of a murdered man was found about four miles south-east of Pretty Pine, beside the road from Deniliquin. The man was a hawker named George Mizon; he was found lying dead beneath his waggonette and covered with rags and sheepskins, with a fracture to his skull probably inflicted by a tomahawk found at the scene. Four days later Joseph Cordini, a French bush-worker born in Marseilles, was arrested at Mathoura for the murder. A cheque belonging to the hawker was found in Cordini's possession. He was tried at Deniliquin in April 1884, found guilty and sentenced to death. The evidence on which he was convicted was "purely circumstantial" and relied substantially on testimony given by Albert Stevenson and his wife, who kept "a sort of grog shanty a little off the main road" near where the murder occurred. After the verdict Cordini's defence team, convinced of their client's innocence, agitated for a reprieve "in order that the matter might be more thoroughly investigated". The French Consul-General in Sydney became involved and representations were made to the colonial government. The Executive Council granted a short reprieve while further investigations were carried out, but eventually the Attorney-General decided that allegations promulgated by the defence were unfounded. The execution of Joseph Cordini was carried out by the New South Wales colonial executioner Robert Howard on 13 June 1884 at Deniliquin Gaol. The prisoner maintained his innocence throughout; his last words were: "I did not hurt anyone in my life".

=== A prospective village ===
Even though official government documents and notifications referred to the location as 'Dahwilly', the name 'Pretty Pine' remained as the preferred descriptor for the locality. Government documents often used both names.

Anastasia Hole died at her home at Pretty Pine on 1 April 1885, aged 41. In May 1885 Sergeant George Rowe of the New South Wales Police Force, stationed at Deniliquin, resigned his position in the police to start a business as a publican. He became the licensee of the Pretty Pine Hotel after leasing the property from Matthew Hole.^{[A]}

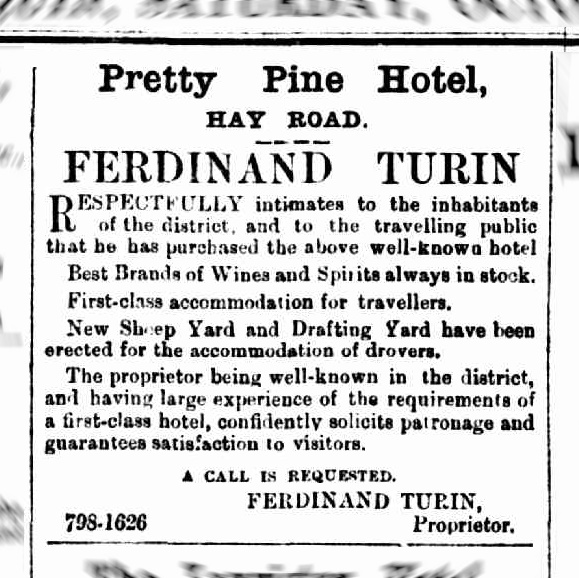
Pretty Pine Hotel advertisement, The Pastoral Times, 25 October 1890.

In June 1886 it was reported that the construction of the Government tank at Pretty Pine had been completed, ensuring that water was available for travelling stock. Previously the scarcity of water at the locality had been "a source of trouble to drovers". The works at the site were described as being "of a substantial character". They consisted of (1) a timbered well with a good supply of permanent water, which could be elevated "by small tanks in a cage worked by a whim"; (2) a receiving tank, 25 feet square and six feet deep, with a capacity of about fifty thousand gallons; and, (3) cast-iron troughing extending from the tank for about 150 yards, from which up to about a thousand sheep could be watered at one time. The publican of the Pretty Pine Hotel, George Rowe, had secured a five-year lease of the tank.

In August 1886 Miss Annie O'Mara was appointed as a teacher at the Pretty Pine Provisional school. In December 1887 Charles Norman was appointed as a teacher to the Pretty Pine school. In July 1889 the teacher at the school was Miss Sarah Colls.

Pretty Pine was the first stopping-place for passenger coaches travelling from Deniliquin to Hay. In an account of such a journey, published in 1888, the writer commented that at Pretty Pine "there is a native pine tree carefully fenced, from which the little inn takes its name". In 1889 the Pretty Pine Hotel was described as a "commodious" hotel with "all necessary out buildings", including stables for twenty horses, stock-yards, tanks and wells. The property was attached to eight acres of freehold land and a leased paddock of 320 acres of Crown land.

In the Deniliquin Police Court in December 1889 the publican George Rowe was charged "with abandoning his licensed premises at Pretty Pine". In January 1890 it was reported that the Pretty Pine Hotel had been sold by Matthew Hole to Ferdinand Turin.

In September 1890 it was reported that an application for a post office at Pretty Pine was under consideration by the postal authorities. The post office opened soon afterwards. By February 1891 the coaching company of Robertson, Wagner & Co. had the government mail delivery contract for Pretty Pine post-office as part of their daily passenger coach service between Deniliquin and Hay.

In February 1902 Ada Smith was appointed as a teacher on probation at the Pretty Pine Provisional School.

=== A rural hub ===
The post office at Pretty Pine was closed in September 1942.

In 1946 the school at Pretty Pine was described as a "subsidised school". In 1949 efforts were made to establish a school bus service to Deniliquin from the communities at Wanganella, Pretty Pine and Morago.

In April 1954 an automatic telephone exchange began operating at Pretty Pine with one direct trunk line to Deniliquin, replacing the manually operated magneto equipment. Seventeen subscribers were initially connected to 40-unit automatic unit at the Pretty Pine exchange.

In 2003 the Australian Electoral Commission abolished the Pretty Pine polling place in the federal electorate of Farrer.

In the 2016 Census Pretty Pine and surrounding district had a population of 63 persons (of which 58.7% were male), living in 30 private dwellings. The median age of the population was 33 years.

In the 2021 Census Pretty Pine and surrounding district had a population of 59 persons (of which 52.9% were male), living in 34 private dwellings. The median age of the population was 47 years.

== Notes ==
A. In May 1886, after reports of gold discoveries in the Kimberley district of Western Australia, Matthew Hole and a group of investors formed a party to travel to the gold field. In November 1887 it was reported that Hole had taken over the license of Pyke's Hotel on the corner of Napier and George streets in Deniliquin.
