= Edward River Council =

- Local government area
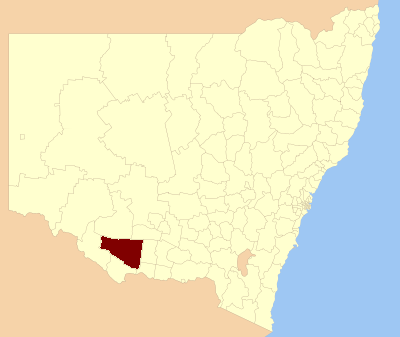
- Location in New South Wales

- Interactive map of Edward River Council
- Coordinates: 35°32′S 144°58′E
- Country: Australia
- State: New South Wales
- Region: Murray
- Established: 12 May 2016
- Council seat: Deniliquin

Government
  - Mayor: Ash Hall
  - State electorate: Murray
  - Federal division: Farrer

Area
  - Total: 8,881 km^{2} (3,429 sq mi)

Population
  - Totals: 8,851 (2016 census); 8,995 (2018 est.)
  - Density: 0.99662/km^{2} (2.58124/sq mi)
- Website: Edward River Council
LGAs around Edward River Council
Hay	Hay	Murrumbidgee
Murray River	Edward River Council	Murrumbidgee
Murray River	Murray River	Berrigan

The Edward River Council is a local government area in the Murray region of New South Wales, Australia. This area was formed in 2016 from the merger of the Deniliquin Council with the surrounding Conargo Shire.

The combined area covers the urban area of Deniliquin and the surrounding region to the north and west across the pastoral southern Riverina plains.

The inaugural mayor of the Edward River Council is Norm Brennan, elected by the councillors on 20 September 2017.

== Main towns and villages ==
In addition to the main centre of Deniliquin, localities in the area include Blighty, Booroorban, Conargo, Mayrung, Morago, Pretty Pine and Wanganella.

== Council ==
Edward River Council has nine councillors elected proportionally as a single ward. All councillors are elected for a fixed four-year term of office.

The most recent election was held on 4 December 2021.

== Election results ==
=== 2024 ===
2024 New South Wales local elections: Edward River
Party	Candidate	Votes	%	±%
Independent	Kellie Crossley (elected)	1,002	20.2	
Independent	Ashley Hall (elected)	750	15.1	
Independent Liberal	Craig Druitt (elected)	745	15.0	
Independent	Frank Schofield (elected)	626	12.6	
Independent	Leanne Mulham (elected)	465	9.4	
Independent Liberal	Shirlee Burge (elected)	389	7.8	−2.4
Independent	Ken Bates (elected)	243	4.9	
Independent	Linda Fawns (elected)	156	3.1	−5.6
Independent	David Schoeffel	123	2.5	
Independent	Shannon Sampson (elected)	121	2.4	−0.6
Independent	Richard McDaid	111	2.2	
Independent	Airlie Circuitt	80	1.6	
Independent	Donna McFeeters	56	1.1	
Independent	Collin Sander	55	1.1	
Independent	Jeff Shand	33	0.7	
Independent	Greg Briscoe-Hough	15	0.3	
Total formal votes		4,970	95.2	
Informal votes		250	4.8	
Turnout		5,220	81.2	

=== 2021 ===
2021 New South Wales local elections: Edward River
Party	Candidate	Votes	%	±%
Independent	Pat Fogarty (elected)	997	21.9	
Independent	Paul Fellows (elected)	783	17.2	
Independent National	Peta Betts (elected)	705	15.5	
Independent Liberal	Shirlee Burge (elected)	463	10.2	
Independent	Linda Fawns (elected)	398	8.7	
Independent	Harold Clapham (elected)	358	7.9	
Independent	Peter Connell (elected)	276	6.1	
Independent	Tarria Moore (elected)	211	4.6	
Independent	Marc Petersen (elected)	183	4.0	
Independent	Shannon Sampson	138	3.0	
Independent	Narelle Whitham	47	1.0	
Total formal votes		4,559	94.9	
Informal votes		245	5.1	
Turnout		4,804	75.8	

== See also ==
- Local government areas of New South Wales
- Edward River Council Website
