= Townsend County =

Townsend
- Cadastral division
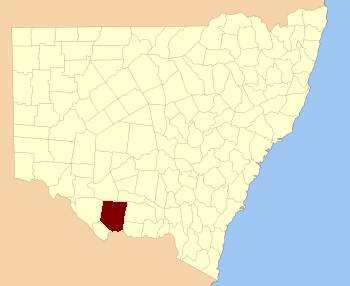
- Location in New South Wales
- Country: Australia
- State: New South Wales
Lands administrative divisions around Townsend
Waradgery	Waradgery	Boyd
Wakool	Townsend	Urana
Cadell	Moira (Vic)	Denison

Townsend County is one of the 141 cadastral divisions of New South Wales. It is in the south of New South Wales with the Murray River to the south. Deniliquin is located there.

Townsend County was named in honour of the surveyor Thomas S Townsend who was an assistant surveyor to Thomas Livingstone Mitchell.

== Parishes within this county ==
A full list of parishes found within this county; their current LGA and mapping coordinates to the approximate centre of each location is as follows:

Banangalite	Edward River Council	35°19′54″S 144°38′04″E
Barratta	Edward River Council	35°13′54″S 144°33′04″E
Belmore	Edward River Council	35°13′54″S 145°00′04″E
Billabong	Edward River Council	35°06′54″S 144°35′04″E
Bingellibunbi	Edward River Council	35°01′54″S 144°43′04″E
Birganbigil	Edward River Council	35°30′54″S 145°11′04″E
Blackwood	Edward River Council	35°31′54″S 145°23′04″E
Booabula	Edward River Council	35°08′54″S 145°00′04″E
Boonoke	Edward River Council	35°19′54″S 145°03′04″E
Boorga	Murray River Council	35°41′54″S 145°10′04″E
Booroorban	Edward River Council	35°00′54″S 144°45′04″E
Boree	Edward River Council	35°17′54″S 144°48′04″E
Bowna	Edward River Council	34°51′54″S 145°26′04″E
Boyeo	Murray River Council	35°44′54″S 144°53′04″E
Brassi	Murray River Council	35°30′54″S 144°46′04″E
Bullatella	Murray River Council	35°44′54″S 145°00′04″E
Bungooka	Murray River Council	35°44′54″S 145°09′04″E
Campbell	Edward River Council	35°04′54″S 145°11′04″E
Carroonboon North	Edward River Council	35°00′54″S 144°37′04″E
Carroonboon	Edward River Council	35°01′54″S 144°37′04″E
Carse	Edward River Council	34°54′54″S 145°27′04″E
Citgathen	Murray River Council	35°35′54″S 144°49′04″E
Colimo	Murray River Council	35°28′54″S 144°36′04″E
Conargo	Edward River Council	35°19′54″S 145°07′04″E
Coolagali	Edward River Council	35°34′54″S 145°05′04″E
Coolambil	Edward River Council	35°08′54″S 145°04′04″E
Cornalla	Murray River Council	35°47′54″S 145°03′04″E
Cudoc	Murray River Council	35°41′54″S 144°47′04″E
Currabunganung	Edward River Council	35°23′54″S 145°27′04″E
Dahwilly	Edward River Council	35°25′54″S 144°52′04″E
Derrulaman	Murray River Council	35°37′54″S 145°00′04″E
Devon	Edward River Council	35°14′54″S 144°42′04″E
Drysdale	Edward River Council	34°51′54″S 144°44′04″E
Dulverton	Edward River Council	35°13′54″S 144°49′04″E
Dunkeld	Edward River Council	35°01′54″S 145°20′04″E
Edgar	Edward River Council	35°01′54″S 145°16′04″E
Euroka	Edward River Council	35°07′54″S 145°22′04″E
Euroley	Edward River Council	34°52′54″S 145°00′04″E
Finlay	Edward River Council	35°03′54″S 145°05′04″E
Gilbert	Edward River Council	35°02′54″S 145°00′04″E
Gobram	Murray River Council	35°31′54″S 144°34′04″E
Gonawarra	Edward River Council	35°05′54″S 144°54′04″E
Gotha	Murray River Council	35°35′54″S 144°39′04″E
Harold	Edward River Council	34°56′54″S 145°06′04″E
Hartwood	Edward River Council	35°18′54″S 145°28′04″E
Hebden	Edward River Council	35°08′54″S 144°01′04″E
Jung Jung	Edward River Council	34°59′54″S 145°26′04″E
Kerranakoon	Edward River Council	35°24′54″S 144°46′04″E
Lamb	Edward River Council	35°05′54″S 145°00′04″E
Loch	Edward River Council	34°51′54″S 145°22′04″E
Mallee	Edward River Council	35°12′54″S 144°56′04″E
Monimail	Edward River Council	35°20′54″S 144°55′04″E
Moonbria	Edward River Council	35°12′54″S 145°21′04″E
Morago	Edward River Council	35°20′54″S 144°38′04″E
Morton	Edward River Council	34°53′54″S 145°32′04″E
Moultrassie	Edward River Council	34°56′54″S 145°21′04″E
Mundiwa	Edward River Council	35°31′04″S 145°05′34″E
Myall	Edward River Council	34°54′54″S 144°37′04″E
Nallam	Murray River Council	35°48′54″S 144°57′04″E
Nardoo	Edward River Council	35°05′54″S 145°30′04″E
Narrama	Edward River Council	35°31′54″S 145°17′04″E
Narratoola	Murray River Council	35°44′54″S 145°18′04″E
Neerim	Edward River Council	35°09′54″S 145°09′04″E
North Conargo	Edward River Council	35°14′54″S 145°08′04″E
North Currabunganung	Edward River Council	35°18′54″S 145°21′04″E
North Deniliquin	Edward River Council	35°31′54″S 145°00′04″E
North Moonbria	Edward River Council	35°02′54″S 145°25′04″E
North Zara	Edward River Council	35°05′54″S 144°45′04″E
Nyangay	Edward River Council	34°53′54″S 144°49′04″E
Officer	Edward River Council	35°04′54″S 144°42′04″E
Palmer	Edward River Council	34°52′54″S 144°54′04″E
Peppin	Edward River Council	35°13′54″S 144°53′04″E
Powheep	Edward River Council	34°54′54″S 145°16′04″E
Puckawidgee	Edward River Council	35°12′54″S 145°14′04″E
Pungulgui	Edward River Council	35°39′54″S 145°19′04″E
Purdanima	Murray River Council	35°31′54″S 144°41′04″E
Quandong	Edward River Council	34°51′54″S 144°39′04″E
Quiamong	Edward River Council	35°21′54″S 145°14′04″E
Ricketson	Edward River Council	35°13′54″S 144°39′04″E
Ronald	Edward River Council	34°56′54″S 144°49′04″E
South Deniliquin	Edward River Council	35°34′54″S 144°56′04″E
South Zara	Edward River Council	35°11′54″S 144°44′04″E
Stanaforth	Edward River Council	35°11′54″S 144°33′04″E
Tawarra	Murray River Council	35°43′54″S 145°14′04″E
Tholobin	Edward River Council	35°24′54″S 145°06′04″E
Thulabin	Edward River Council	35°23′54″S 145°18′04″E
Thurgoon	Edward River Council	35°36′54″S 145°10′04″E
Towool	Murray River Council	35°41′54″S 145°03′04″E
Tumudgery	Murray River Council	35°25′54″S 144°41′04″E
Walla	Edward River Council	34°59′54″S 145°33′04″E
Wandook	Edward River Council	35°26′54″S 145°02′04″E
Wanganella	Edward River Council	35°09′54″S 144°50′04″E
Warbreccan	Murray River Council	35°30′54″S 144°51′04″E
Wargam	Edward River Council	35°00′54″S 144°55′04″E
Warrawool	Edward River Council	35°37′54″S 145°15′04″E
Warriston	Edward River Council	35°08′54″S 145°15′04″E
Warwillah	Edward River Council	35°01′54″S 144°54′04″E
Werai	Murray River Council	35°20′54″S 144°32′04″E
Werkenbergal	Edward River Council	34°59′54″S 145°00′04″E
Willeroo	Edward River Council	35°27′54″S 145°11′04″E
Willurah	Edward River Council	34°59′54″S 145°07′04″E
Winter	Edward River Council	35°01′54″S 144°48′04″E
Wollamai	Edward River Council	35°31′54″S 145°27′04″E
Wonnue	Berrigan Shire	35°44′54″S 145°23′04″E
Wononga	Edward River Council	35°13′54″S 145°28′04″E
Woonox	Edward River Council	35°26′54″S 144°57′04″E
Wureep	Edward River Council	34°52′54″S 145°07′04″E
Yalama	Murray River Council	35°39′54″S 144°53′04″E
Yalgadoori	Edward River Council	35°39′54″S 145°24′04″E
Yallakool	Murray River Council	35°39′54″S 144°30′04″E
Yaloke	Murray River Council	35°37′54″S 144°44′04″E
