= Wanganella, New South Wales =

Wanganella
- Town
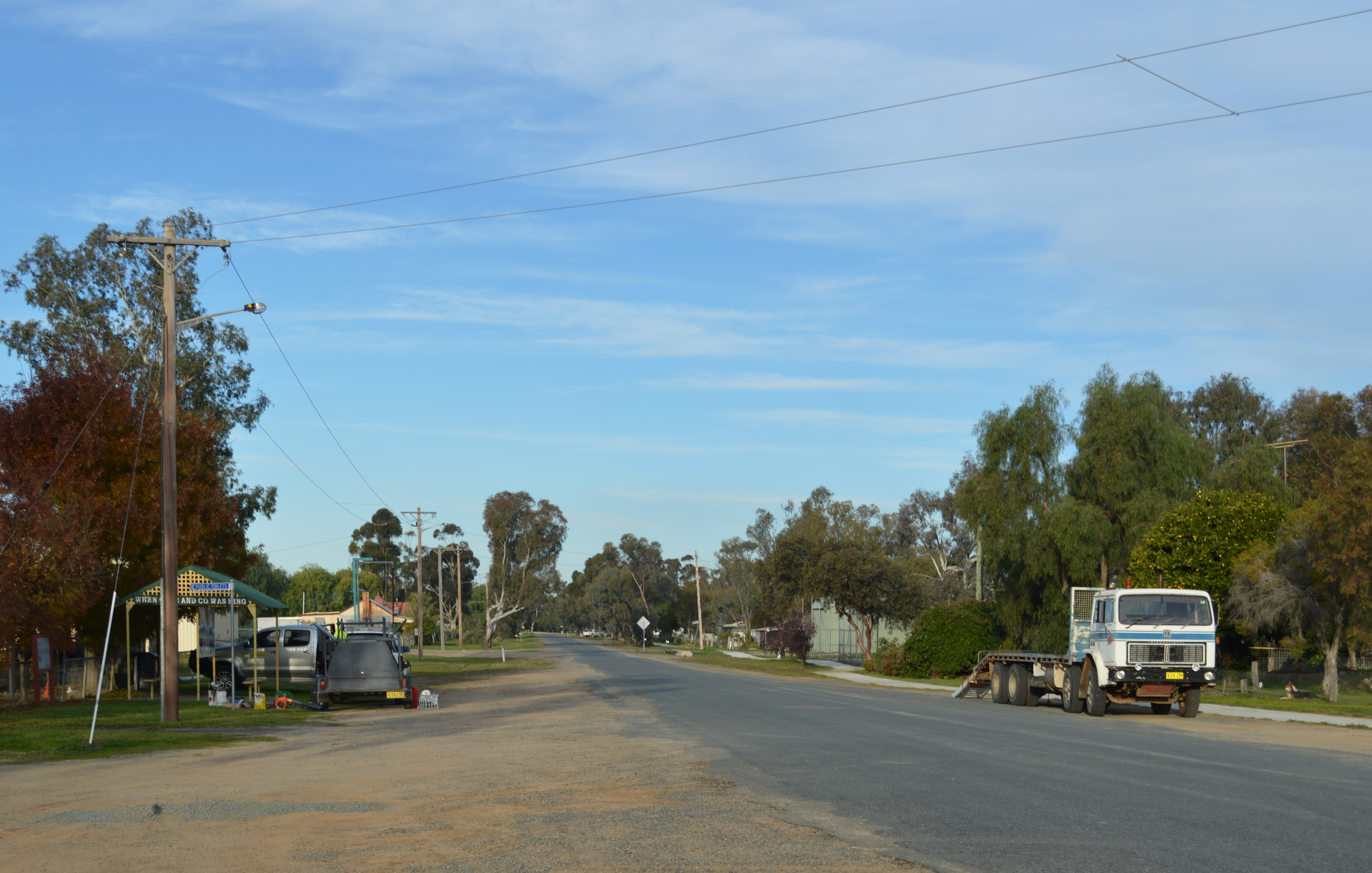
- Lang Street, the main street of Wanganella

- Coordinates: 35°11′S 144°48′E
- Country: Australia
- State: New South Wales
- LGA: Edward River Council
- Location: 40 km (25 mi) from Deniliquin; 80 km (50 mi) from Hay

Government
  - State electorate: Murray
  - Federal division: Farrer

Population
  - Total: 30 (2016 census)
- Postcode: 2710
- County: Townsend

Wanganella /ˈwæŋɡənɛlə/ is a village community on the Billabong Creek in New South Wales, Australia. The settlement is on the Cobb Highway, located between Hay (to the north) and Deniliquin (to the south). Wanganella is within the Edward River Council local government area. At the 2016 census, Wanganella had a population of 30.

== History ==
Land was subdivided at Wanganella and in 1864 allotments were sold. A traveller passing through Wanganella in mid-1865 described the township as consisting "of two public houses, a blacksmith’s shop, and a shoemaker’s shop"; he also stated that "a neat bridge" had been erected over Billabong Creek. Another report from 1865 stated there were twenty-five persons living at Wanganella, which had two inns, two stores and two butchers' shops.

== Climate ==
Rainfall records have been kept for Wanganella from 1862 until 2019, averaging 364.4 millimetres (14.3 in). Temperature data are found between 1914 and 1927.

Climate data for Wanganella
Month	Jan	Feb	Mar	Apr	May	Jun	Jul	Aug	Sep	Oct	Nov	Dec	Year
Mean daily maximum °C (°F)	31.2 (88.2)	31.6 (88.9)	27.7 (81.9)	22.9 (73.2)	18.1 (64.6)	14.5 (58.1)	14.1 (57.4)	15.7 (60.3)	19.0 (66.2)	23.0 (73.4)	26.8 (80.2)	30.4 (86.7)	22.9 (73.2)
Mean daily minimum °C (°F)	15.7 (60.3)	16.3 (61.3)	12.9 (55.2)	9.6 (49.3)	6.8 (44.2)	5.1 (41.2)	3.6 (38.5)	4.2 (39.6)	6.4 (43.5)	9.0 (48.2)	11.9 (53.4)	14.9 (58.8)	9.7 (49.5)
Average precipitation mm (inches)	26.6 (1.05)	27.3 (1.07)	29.9 (1.18)	27.1 (1.07)	34.9 (1.37)	35.5 (1.40)	30.7 (1.21)	32.1 (1.26)	32.2 (1.27)	33.8 (1.33)	27.0 (1.06)	27.2 (1.07)	364.4 (14.35)
