= Independent Pricing and Regulatory Tribunal of New South Wales =

Tribunal overview
- Formed: 1992
- Type: Regulatory and pricing tribunal
- Jurisdiction: New South Wales
- Headquarters: Sydney
- Employees: 200
- Annual budget: A$37 million
- Minister responsible: Premier of New South Wales
- Tribunal executives: Carmel Donnelly, Chairman; Jonathan Coppel, Member; Sharon Henrick, Member; Dr Darryl Biggar, Member
- Parent Tribunal: Department of Premier and Cabinet
- Key documents: Independent Pricing and Regulatory Tribunal Act 1992; Gas Supply Act 1996; Electricity Supply Act 1995; National Electricity (NSW) Law 1997; Transport Administration Act 1996
- Website: www.ipart.nsw.gov.au

The Independent Pricing and Regulatory Tribunal of New South Wales (IPART) is an independent regulatory and pricing tribunal that oversees regulation in water, gas, electricity and transport industries in the Australian state of New South Wales. It was established in 1992 by Government of New South Wales to regulate the maximum prices for monopoly services by government utilities and other monopoly businesses, such as public transport.

IPART's organisational arm or Secretariat is managed by its chief executive officer. It has about 140 staff members and an annual budget of A$25 million. Carmel Donnelly PSM is its current chairperson. IPART reports to the Premier of New South Wales.

IPART's role is defined by several state legislative acts, including the Independent Pricing and Regulatory Tribunal Act 1992, the Gas Supply Act 1996, the Electricity Supply Act 1995, the National Electricity (NSW) Law 1997, and the Transport Administration Act 1996.

== Functions ==
IPART's core functions are conferred by legislation, rules and access regimes established by legislation. They are:

- Set maximum prices for monopoly services provided by government agencies in NSW (including water and public transport).
- Administer licensing or authorisation of water, electricity and gas businesses, and monitor compliance with licence conditions.
- Advise the NSW Government or its agencies on issues such as pricing, efficiency, industry structure and competition.
- Regulate maximum electricity and gas prices that regulated energy retailers can charge to residential and small business customers.
- Regulate private sector access to water and waste water to encourage competition and re-use.
- Maintain a local government cost index, determine the maximum percentage increase in local government general revenue (rate peg), determine special rate variations and review Council development contributions plans.
- Review the regulatory burden in priority industries to reduce red tape.
- Administer the Energy Savings Scheme and associated Register of energy savings certificates.
- Register agreements for access to public infrastructure assets and arbitrate disputes about agreements for access to public infrastructure.
- Investigate complaints about competitive neutrality referred to us by the Government.

IPART also conducts reviews and investigations to advise the NSW government and its agencies on a range of economic and policy issues, such as pricing, efficiency, industry structure and competition.

== Membership ==
=== Tribunal Members ===
The Tribunal comprises three permanent members: a part-time chairman and two part-time tribunal members. Tribunal members are appointed by the premier. The premier can also appoint any number of additional temporary members. As of May 2025, the Tribunal members are:

Name	Title	Term began	Term length	Notes
Carmel Donnelly PSM	Chairman	1 July 2021	5 years	
Jonathan Coppel	Member	16 November 2023	5 years	
Sharon Henrick	Member	1 July 2024	3 years	
Dr Darryl Biggar	temporary Member	1 July 2024	2 years	

=== Notable former members ===
Name	Title	Term began	Term end	Time in office	Notes
Tom Parry	Inaugural Chairman	1992	2004	11–12 years	
