= Cunninyeuk =

- Town
- Coordinates: 35°15′S 143°55′E
- Country: Australia
- State: New South Wales
- LGA: Murray River Council
- Location: 55 km (34 mi) from Moulamein; 35 km (22 mi) from Dilpurra

Government
  - State electorate: Murray
  - Federal division: Farrer

Population
  - Total: 24 (SAL 2021)
- Postcode: 2734
- County: Wakool

Cunninyeuk is a locality in the Murray River Council, New South Wales, Australia.

== Geography ==
Cunninyeuk is in the western part of the Riverina and situated about 35 kilometres (22 mi) by road east of Dilpurra and 55 kilometres (34 mi) south west of Moulamein.

== Heritage listings ==
Gee Gee Bridge was a heritage-listed bridge on Nooroon Road over the Wakool River connecting Cunninyeuk with neighbouring Wetuppa. However it was delisted from the heritage register on 2 March 2018 to allow a new bridge to be built to replace it as part of the Roads & Maritime Services Timber Truss Bridge Strategy. Work commenced in September 2018 with the new bridge opening in May 2020.
