= Murray Downs Homestead =

- Location within New South Wales Location within Australia
- 35°20′27″S 143°35′09″E
- Location: Moulamein Highway Wakool, Murray River Council, New South Wales, Australia

History
- Built: 1866–1891

Site notes
- Owner: Wariat Nominees

New South Wales Heritage Register
- Official name: Murray Downs Homestead
- Type: State heritage (landscape)
- Designated: 17 November 2000
- Reference no.: 1438
- Type: Historic Landscape
- Category: Landscape - Cultural
- Builders: Seutorius Henry Officer and Charles Officer (1866–84); Alfred Felton and Charles Campbell (1884–91)

The Murray Downs Homestead is a heritage-listed homestead at Moulamein Road, Murray Downs, Murray River Council, New South Wales, Australia. It was built by Seutorius Henry Officer and Charles Officer (between 1866 and 1884); and by Alfred Felton and Charles Campbell (between 1884 and 1891). The property is privately owned and as of 2024 the Homestead is no longer open for public inspection. It was added to the New South Wales State Heritage Register on 17 November 2000.

== History ==
The Murray Downs Station was a vast expanse of land in the south west of NSW bordered by the Wakool River to the north and the Murray River to the south. In 1848 Messrs Bell and Wilson applied to lease Crown Land of 61,000 hectares (150,000 acres) which became known as Murray Downs. In 1862 the property was divided into two leases. Murray Downs Station was then 27,418 hectares (67,751 acres) and Melool was 44,704 hectares (110,467 acres). Murray Downs and part of the adjoining property of Melool was acquired by Seutorius Henry Officer and his brother Charles in 1862. At that stage it was all unimproved country without fences. White colonists considered Aboriginal people a threat to themselves and to livestock. All goods arrived by paddle steamer and produce was likewise shipped along the river to Echuca and then by train to Melbourne. The Murray Downs Station prospered in the hands of Seutonius Officer. He was a pioneer of irrigation, established a flourishing citrus grove. The property became a community in itself and had to be self supporting. There was a baker, blacksmith, carpenter, steam engine drivers, drovers, shearers, wool classers etc. On 22 June 1866 the Officer brothers were authorised to purchase land on Murray Downs and by 26 January 1883, Murray Downs consisted of 31,454 hectares (77,725 acres) of purchased land.

The property was sold at auction in 1884 to Alfred Felton and Charles Campbell. The sheep and wool industry flourished during their ownership of the station. In 1889 there were 79,326 sheep shorn on the property, which at that time consisted of 32,651 hectares (80,683 acres). In 1905 the property came under the control of trustee Executors and Agency Company Ltd of Melbourne. In 1917 a merino stud was established under the supervision of Arthur Laird who was to manage the station until 1935. The experiment was successful and Murray Downs was registered as a stud in 1922. In 1969 it was purchased by Kidman Reid & Co. The property has continued to function as a successful sheep station until recent years. The first homestead on Murray Downs was a pine log and mud iron roofed hut lined with hessian and paper. The date of construction was unknown. It was demolished as recently as 1917. The present homestead was commenced in 1866 by the Officers, who built the middle portion. Bricks were brought from Echuca by barge. A comprehensive complex of outbuildings, including sheds and stables for carriage and stable horses, wagons and buggies, a blacksmith's shop and harness room were erected. At this time the garden was also established.

From 1888 to 1891 Messrs Campbell and Felton altered and added to the homestead. The two-storey portion and roof tower was built as a lookout for approaching aborigines as well as the beautifully proportioned dining room. The present brick kitchen was built in 1884.

The house is currently owned on a separate title of 61.43 hectares (151.8 acres) by Matthew and Clare Lewis of Wariat Nominees. The homestead is no longer open to public inspection. The property is still farmed as a hobby farm that provides a backdrop to the historic building complex.

== Description ==
The precinct includes the main house that has a painted rendered finish to brick work, with some face brick, corrugated iron roofs, verandahs all round, two-storey towers, a viewing platform, bay windows, complex roof forms, classical detailing, flush eaves overhangs, and an enclosed an internal courtyard. The courtyard has a fine gravel finish and the edges are defined by the homestead, blacksmiths workshops, and old school house. A 900-millimetre-high (3.0 ft) timber picket fence surrounds the precinct with 1,800-millimetre (71 in) posts topped by decorative finials. A formal garden with decorative planting and geometric garden beds with brick edging; and a small house orchard; a grand driveway is lined by trees of historic significance; and an artificial lake.

=== Condition ===
As at 24 November 2000, the homestead and grounds were in good condition. Repairs and maintenance of the precinct has been constant as required for public display.

The property of the Murray Downs estate has been gradually eroded and disassembled over the years. The original estate has been subdivided repeatedly. Records from the Lands and Titles Office reveal Certificates of Title for the subject property as far back as 1867. Suetonius Henry Officer was granted for the sum of One hundred and ninety six pounds, Lot 29 Vol. 1605 Fol. 14of area 79 hectares (196 acres). The land title according to evidence available remained at this size and configuration until 1969 when a small portion on the north west corner on the main road was subdivided off. The remaining parcel, titled Lot 2 in Deposited Plan 531599 in the shire of Wakool Parish of Yellymong and County of Wakool was 78 hectares (192 acres) in area.

In 1982 another portion at the western end of the lot, 6.7 hectares (17 acres) in area was subdivided from the original lot. The remaining Lot had become a Torrens Title, now defined as Lot 4 in DP 623456 had an area of 71 hectares (180 acres). The next recorded change to the Lot was in 1989 when the eastern boundary was adjusted to increase the property to 89.5 hectares (221 acres). The eastern boundary ran along the road known as Murray Downs Drive and included a parcel along the river further east from the existing and previous boundary. The Lot was then known as Lot 7 in DP 785831. In 1996 the property is shown in its current configuration as Lot 15 DP 859813 with an area of 61.43 hectares (151.8 acres).

The south eastern portion of the site is subdivided into a variety lots including 12 house sized lots along the river frontage and 2 larger lots. namely Lot 1 and Lot 14 of 21 hectares (52 acres) and 2 hectares (4.9 acres) respectively. Subsequently in 1999 council has approved further subdivision of Lot 1 for housing development. The pattern of evolution of the subject lot since 1969 has been gradual reduction in size with subdivision of land into smaller lot sizes. This land use pattern reflects the changing nature of the agricultural industry, which is no longer buoyant and prosperous. It also reflects the increasing popularity of the hobby farm or small boutique farm lot and the demand for single lot housing in out of town locations especially bounding the riverbanks. The homestead itself shows a remarkable likeness to a sketch drawn in 1868. It appears to have had no major additions since the early 1900s. The immediate homestead precinct remains reasonably intact.

=== Modifications and dates ===
The homestead and surrounds evolved and changed over the period 1866-1891. The building complex probably was at its peak around 1890. At this time there were 6 houses on the entire estate and many more outbuildings. While the homestead complex reduced in size since, there have been no new additions to the house itself. Any significant changes in the precinct are to the gardens and surrounds. The intrusion is of little or no significance.

== Heritage listing ==
As at 12 February 2001, the Homestead and its surrounding precinct had historical significance as a record of rural life and industry and their evolution over the last 160 years. The aesthetic significance of the precinct is limited. While the main buildings and surrounds are fine examples of their times, they are not exceptional or innovative or rare. The Murray Downs homestead and surrounds are highly valued by the local Community. The Wakool Council has listed the item in its LEP and DCP as an "historic precinct". The homestead is open to the public for inspection and it is apparent that it is highly valued by the local community and travelers to the region.

The precinct is representative of aristocratic pastoral practices of the 19th century and as such is an example of its type. In the region it represents an endangered aspect of our cultural environment.

Murray Downs Homestead was listed on the New South Wales State Heritage Register on 17 November 2000 having satisfied the following criteria.

The place is important in demonstrating the course, or pattern, of cultural or natural history in New South Wales.

The subject building and surrounds show evidence of historic significance in that they display a record of a particular era in the Murray Valley region and the rise and decline of the agricultural industry. The story of agriculture in Australia in general and on the Murray Downs estate in particular is evidenced here in the buildings and remnants of the wider property. The homestead precinct is a record of the lifestyle of the farming families and their approach to agriculture during the century and the first half of this century.

The place is important in demonstrating aesthetic characteristics and/or a high degree of creative or technical achievement in New South Wales.

The homestead building itself is a work by an unknown designer. The building and its surroundings are landmarks in the local area, providing a physically significant tower and building in an otherwise flat plain dotted with homes. The grand driveway and garden surrounds also provide a point of significance, a highlight in the surrounding utilitarian landscape. The aesthetic characteristics are not unique across the state, but in the context of the region today are significant.

The place has a strong or special association with a particular community or cultural group in New South Wales for social, cultural or spiritual reasons.

The property is listed with the local Council, Shire of Wakool in the Wakool LEP and DCP as a heritage item. The current boundary to the Murray Downs Property defines an "historic precinct" in the Wakool DCP. The homestead is a tourist attraction and the local community takes pride in its existence. It is valued by the neighbouring properties as providing a desirable backdrop to their outlooks. This value is based "on amenity reasons". Heritage Office and Department of Urban Affairs and Planning, P 4-5. The buildings and immediate precinct are not crucial to the community's sense of place.

The place has potential to yield information that will contribute to an understanding of the cultural or natural history of New South Wales.

The buildings do provide evidence of past lifestyles however these are available elsewhere. They have little research and/or educational potential

The place possesses uncommon, rare or endangered aspects of the cultural or natural history of New South Wales.

The house in itself is not a rare building. Many such examples of residential buildings built in the late 1800s exist throughout Australia. However in the context of the region the entire precinct is rare. There are few remaining examples of the grand rural estate in the Murray Valley region. As such the old homestead tells a story the people in the present. The grand homestead and surrounding court and utilitarian buildings are generally under threat as the farming industry declines or is industrialized.

The place is important in demonstrating the principal characteristics of a class of cultural or natural places/environments in New South Wales.

The homestead, blacksmiths workshop and school house all represent their class of items i.e. rural outbuildings of a residential and working nature. They are unaltered and typical of such outbuildings. They have the principal characteristics such as materials and construction methods. The buildings are outstanding as part of their immediate setting and their place in the local region rather than due to their individual merit.

== See also ==
- Australian residential architectural styles
