= Wetuppa, New South Wales =

Wetuppa is a locality in the Murray River Council, New South Wales, Australia.

== Heritage listings ==
Gee Gee Bridge was a heritage-listed bridge on Nooroon Road over the Wakool River connecting Wettup with neighbouring Cunninyeuk. However it was delisted from the heritage register on 2 March 2018 to allow a new bridge to be built to replace it as part of the Roads & Maritime Services Timber Truss Bridge Strategy. Work commenced in September 2018 with the new bridge opening in May 2020.
