= Yallakool =

Yallakool New South Wales
- Coordinates: 35°31′48″S 144°27′36″E
- Postcode(s): 2710
- Location: 10 km (6 mi) from Caldwell; 50 km (31 mi) from Deniliquin
- LGA(s): Murray River Council
- County: Cadell
- State electorate(s): Murray
- Federal division(s): Farrer

Yallakool is an unbounded village community within the locality of Caldwell in the central south part of the Riverina in New South Wales, Australia. It is situated by road about 10 kilometres (6.2 mi) north west of Caldwell and 50 kilometres (31 mi) west of Deniliquin, but is a part of the Murray River Council.

Yallakool Post Office opened on 17 August 1927 and closed in 1965.
