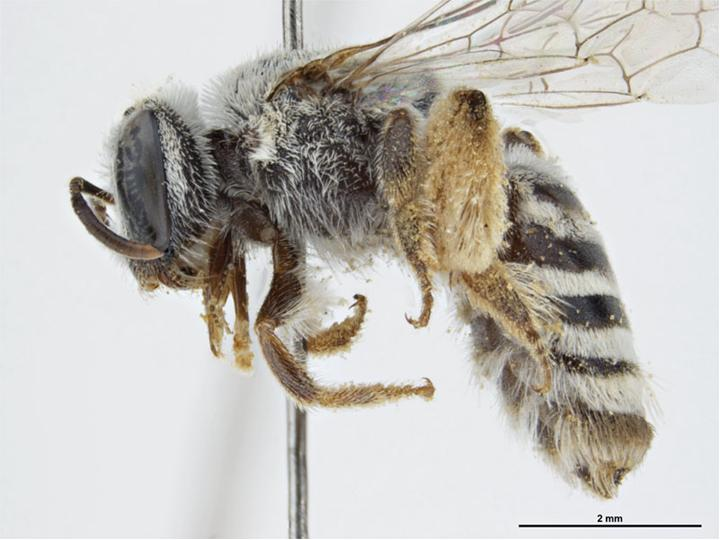
- Female

Scientific classification
- Kingdom: Animalia
- Phylum: Arthropoda
- Clade: Pancrustacea
- Class: Insecta
- Order: Hymenoptera
- Family: Colletidae
- Genus: Leioproctus
- Species: L. tarsalis

Binomial name
- Leioproctus tarsalis (Rayment, 1959)

Synonyms
- Protomorpha tarsalis Rayment, 1959

= Leioproctus tarsalis =

Species of bee

Leioproctus tarsalis, or Leioproctus (Protomorpha) tarsalis, is a species of bee in the family Colletidae and subfamily Colletinae. It is endemic to Australia. It was described by Australian entomologist Tarlton Rayment in 1959.

== Description ==
Male body length about 7 mm. Integumental colouration mainly black, hair white.

== Distribution and habitat ==
The species occurs across much of mainland Australia. The type locality is Caldwell, New South Wales, in the Riverina region.

== Behaviour ==
The adults are flying mellivores. Flowering plants visited by the bees include Eucalyptus species.

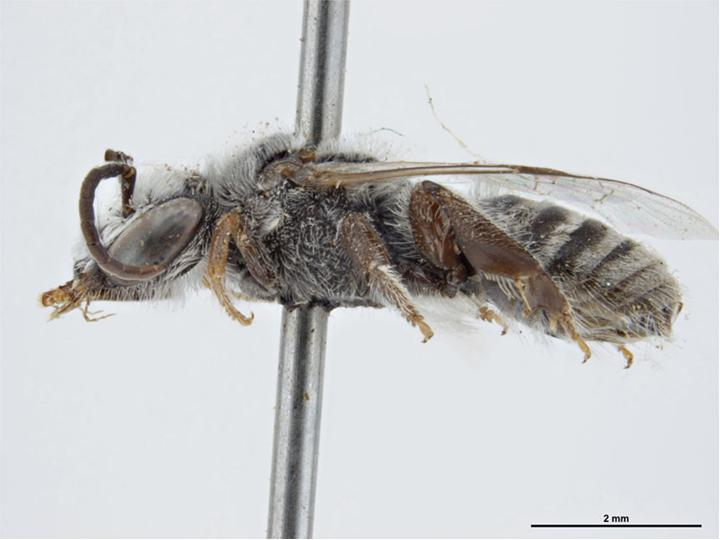
Male
