= Stony Crossing, New South Wales =

Stony Crossing New South Wales
- Coordinates: 35°04′S 143°34′E
- Population: 27 (SAL 2021)
- Postcode(s): 2734
- Elevation: 73 m (240 ft)
- Location: 22 km (14 mi) from Kyalite; 35 km (22 mi) from Swan Hill
- LGA(s): Murray River Council
- County: Wakool
- State electorate(s): Murray
- Federal division(s): Farrer

Stony Crossing is a locality in the south western part of the Riverina on the south bank of the Wakool River. By road, it is about 22 kilometres (14 mi) south east from Kyalite and 35 kilometres (22 mi) north west from Swan Hill.

The Stony Crossing railway line from Kerang, Victoria reached Stony Crossing in March 1928, after the Murray River at Gonn Crossing. Initially, there were three trains per week to Murrabit, with one continuing on to Stony Crossing. Services were suspended between Murrabit and Stony Crossing in 1943. The Stony Crossing station nameboard was relocated to the North Williamstown Railway Museum.

Stony Crossing Post Office opened on 16 October 1890 and closed in 1956.
