= Coonamit Bridge =

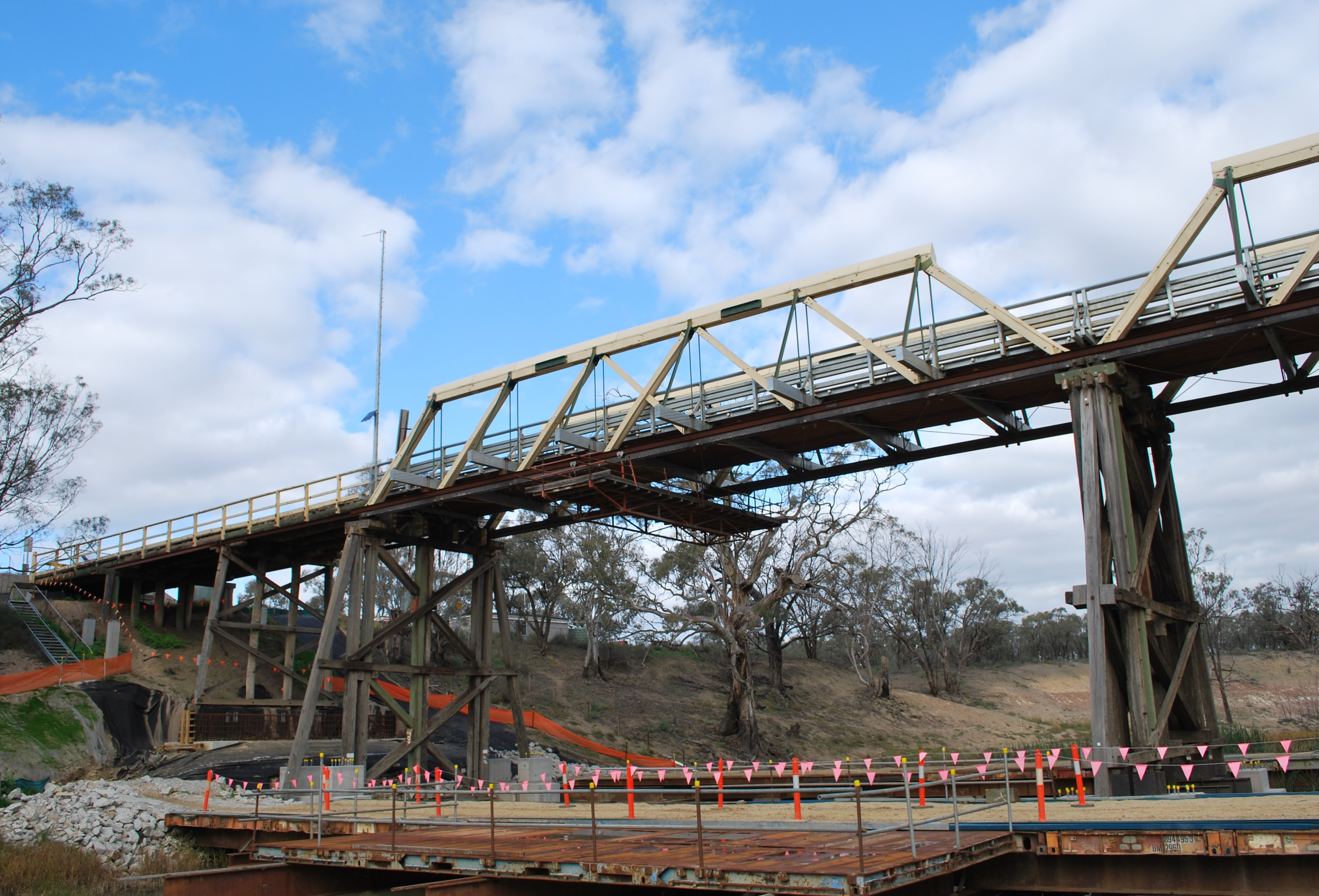
- Coonamit Bridge over Wakool River in 2010
- Coordinates: 35°08′07″S 143°40′53″E
- Carries: Swan Hill Road
- Crosses: Wakool River
- Locale: Murray River Council, New South Wales, Australia
- Begins: Mallan
- Ends: Dilpurra
- Owner: Transport for NSW

Characteristics
- Design: Dare truss
- Material: Timber
- Total length: 128 metres (420 ft)
- Width: 5.5 metres (18 ft)
- Longest span: 28.2 metres (93 ft)
- No. of spans: Two

History
- Architect: Harvey Dare
- Opened: 1929

New South Wales Heritage Register
- Official name: Coonamit Bridge over Wakool River
- Type: State heritage (built)
- Designated: 20 June 2000
- Reference no.: 1464
- Type: Road Bridge
- Category: Transport – Land

The Coonamit Bridge is a heritage-listed road bridge that carries Swan Hill Road across the Wakool River, connecting Mallan and Dilpurra in the Riverina region of New South Wales, Australia. The bridge was designed by Harvey Dare and built in 1929. The bridge is owned by Transport for NSW and was added to the New South Wales State Heritage Register on 20 June 2000.

== History ==
Timber truss road bridges have played a significant role in the expansion and improvement of the NSW road network. Prior to the bridges being built, river crossings were often dangerous in times of rain, which caused bulk freight movement to be prohibitively expensive for most agricultural and mining produce. Only the high priced wool clip of the time was able to carry the costs and inconvenience imposed by the generally inadequate river crossings that often existed prior to the trusses construction. Timber truss bridges were preferred by the Public Works Department from the mid 19th to the early 20th century because they were relatively cheap to construct, and used mostly local materials. The financially troubled governments of the day applied pressure to the Public Works Department to produce as much road and bridge work for as little cost as possible, using local materials. This condition effectively prohibited the use of iron and steel, as these, prior to the construction of the steel works at Newcastle in the early 20th century, had to be imported from England.

Harvey Dare, the designer of Dare truss and other bridges, was a leading engineer in the Public Works Department, and a prominent figure in early 20th century NSW.

Timber truss bridges and timber bridges generally were so common that NSW was known to travelers as the "timber bridge state".

== Description ==
Coonamit Bridge is a Dare type timber truss road bridge. It has two timber truss spans, each of 28.2 metres (93 ft). There are five approach spans at one end and two at the other, giving the bridge an overall length of 128 metres (420 ft). The superstructure is supported by timber trestles and provides a carriage way with a minimum width of 5.5 metres (18 ft). The guard rail is of timber post and rail construction and extends the full length of the bridge.

=== Condition ===
2018, the physical condition is good and intact.

== Heritage listing ==
The Coonamit Bridge is a Dare type timber truss bridge that was completed in 1929. In 1998 it was in good condition. As a timber truss road bridge, it has many associational links with important historical events, trends, and people, including the expansion of the road network and economic activity throughout NSW, and Harvey Dare, the designer of this type of truss. Dare trusses were fifth in the five stage design evolution of NSW timber truss road bridges. They were similar to Allan trusses, but contain improvements which make them stronger and easier to maintain. This engineering enhancement represents a significant evolution of the design of timber truss bridges, and gives Dare trusses some technical significance. In 1998 there were 27 surviving Dare trusses in NSW of the 40 built, and 82 timber truss road bridges survive from the over 400 built. The Coonamit bridge is a representative example of Dare timber truss road bridges, and is assessed as being State significant, primarily on the basis of its technical and historical significance.

The Coonamit Bridge over Wakool River was listed on the New South Wales State Heritage Register on 20 June 2000, having satisfied the following criteria.

The place is important in demonstrating the course, or pattern, of cultural or natural history in New South Wales.

Through the bridge's association with the expansion of the NSW road network, its ability to demonstrate historically important concepts such as the gradual acceptance of NSW people of American design ideas, and its association with Harvey Dare, it has historical significance.

The place has strong or special association with a particular community or cultural group in New South Wales for social, cultural or spiritual reasons.

Timber truss bridges are prominent to road travellers, and NSW has in the past been referred to as the "timber truss bridge state". Through this, the complete set of bridges gain some social significance, as they could be said to be held in reasonable esteem by many travellers in NSW. The Coonamit bridge is valued only for its utility by the local population.

The place possesses uncommon, rare or endangered aspects of the cultural or natural history of New South Wales.

Rare – In 1998 there were 27 surviving Dare trusses in NSW of the 40 built, and 82 timber truss road bridges survive from the over 400 built. The Coonamit Bridge is also the last timber truss bridge built in NSW.

The place is important in demonstrating the principal characteristics of a class of cultural or natural places/environments in New South Wales.

This bridge is a representative of Dare truss bridges.

== See also ==
- Historic bridges of New South Wales
- List of bridges in Australia

== External lianks ==
Media related to Coonamit Bridge over Wakool River at Wikimedia Commons
