= Tooleybuc =

- Town
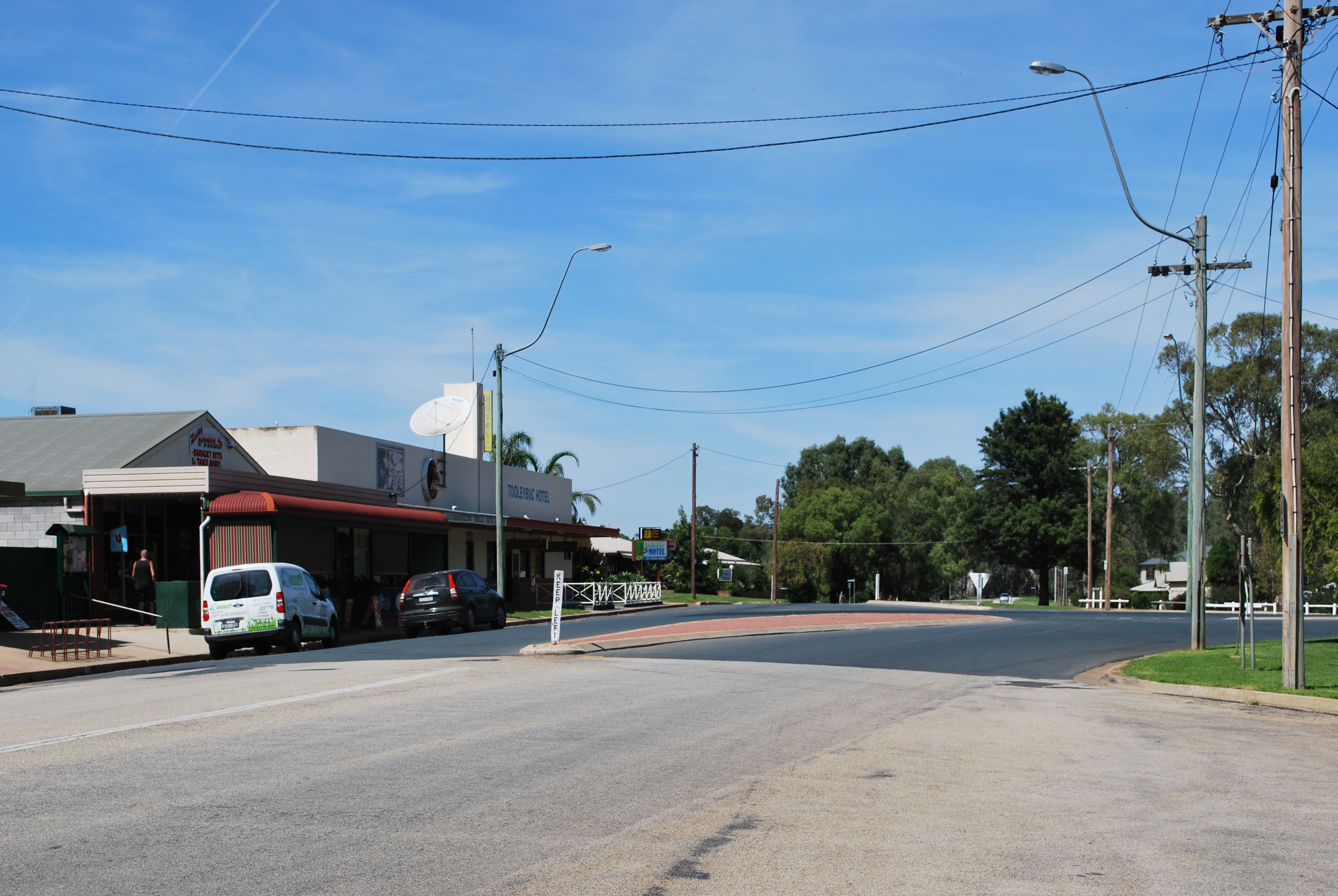
- Murray Street, the main street of Tooleybuc, near the approach to the bridge

- Coordinates: 35°01′48″S 143°20′17″E
- Country: Australia
- State: New South Wales
- LGA: Murray River Council
- Location: 919 km (571 mi) SW of Sydney; 381 km (237 mi) NW of Melbourne; 46 km (29 mi) NW of Swan Hill

Government
  - State electorate: Murray
  - Federal division: Farrer

Population
  - Total: 277 (2016 census)
- Postcode: 2736
- County: Wakool

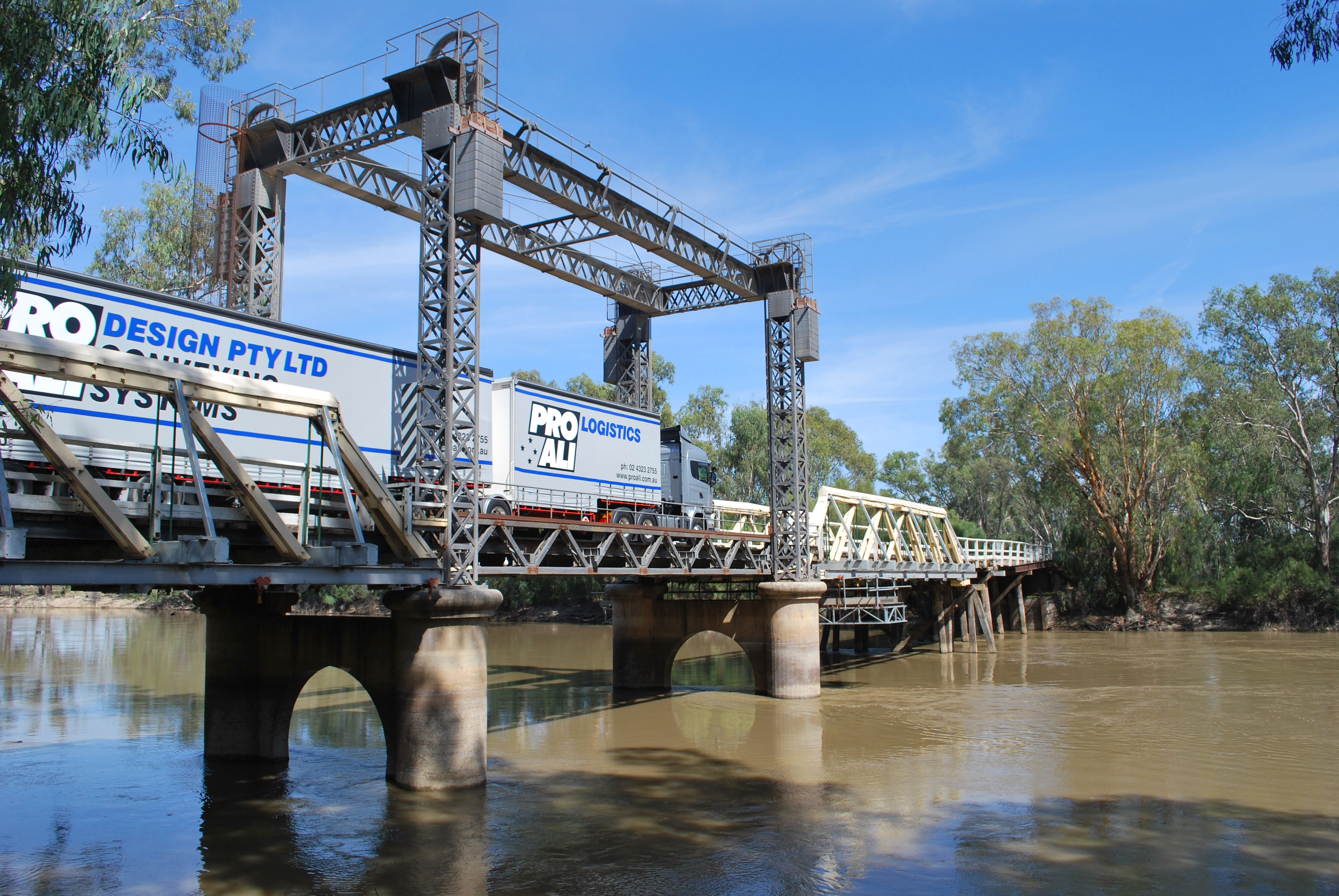
Tooleybuc bridge, built in 1925

Tooleybuc /ˈtuːlɪbʌk/ is a town in the western Riverina district of New South Wales, Australia. The town is located on the Mallee Highway, 919 kilometres (571 mi) southwest of the state capital, Sydney and 381 kilometres (237 mi) north west of Melbourne. Situated on the banks of the Murray River across from Piangil in the neighbouring state of Victoria, at the 2011 census, Tooleybuc has a population of 277. The town is in the Murray River Council local government area. The Tooleybuc Bridgekeepers Cottage close to the Tooleybuc Bridge is of particular local historic interest. It is open to the public.

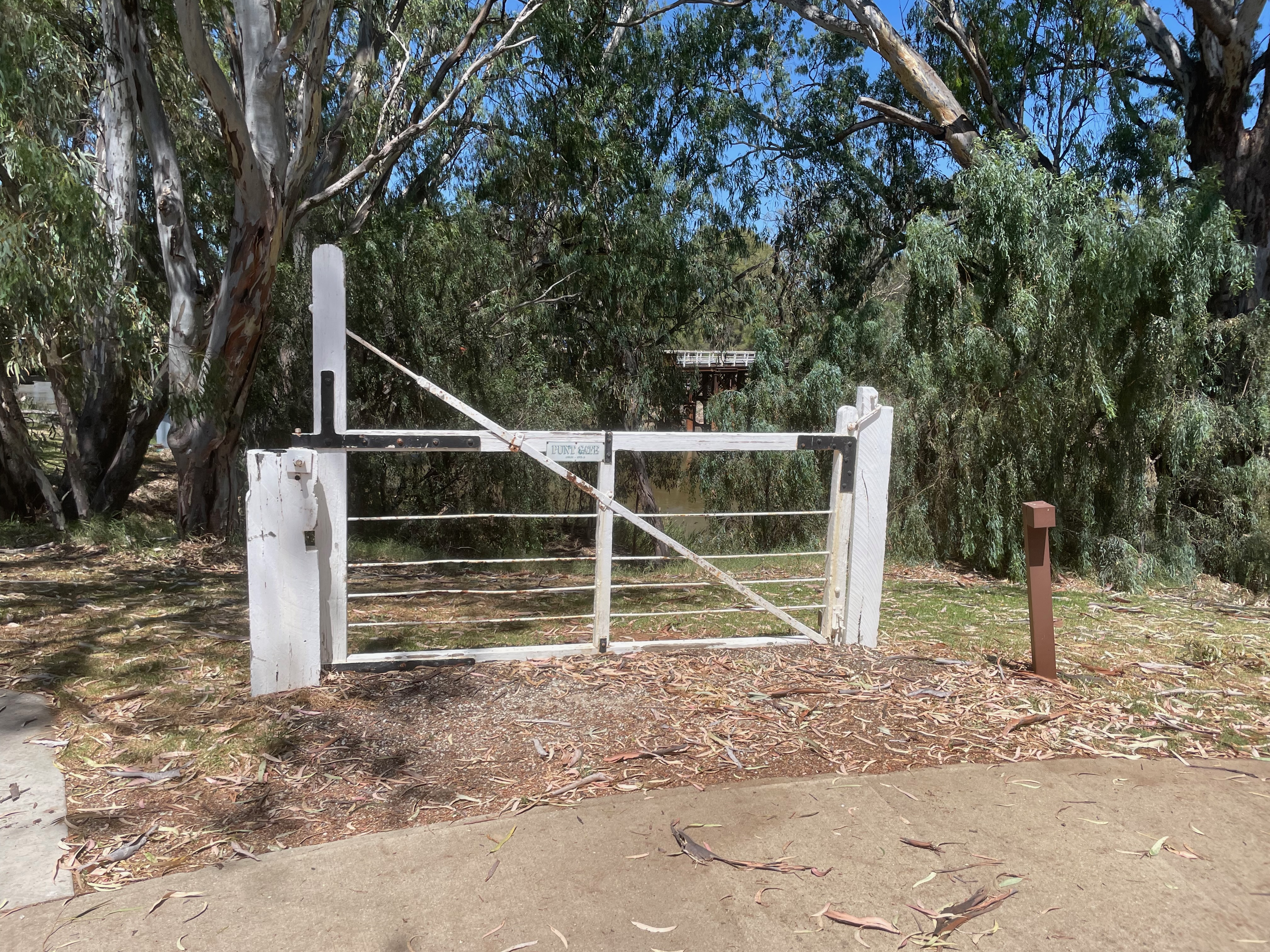
The Gate controlled access to the Punt river crossing prior to the construction of Tooleybuc Bridge

== History ==
The Post Office opened on 1 February 1873 and closed in 1885. However, a Post Office agency has been run in the town for many years, usually in the General Store.

In 1876 the settlement at Tooleybuc was described in the following terms:

Tooley Buc is on the New South Wales side of the river, and is on the mail road between Swan-hill and Balranald, being nearly equidistant between the two places. There is no township, but there is a good deal of settlement in the neighbourhood. A store and post-office are attached to the public-house. Tooley Buc is a crossing-place for sheep and cattle.

== Heritage listings ==
Tooleybuc has a number of heritage-listed sites, including:

- 222 Main Road: Tooleybuc Bridge over Murray River

Tooleybuc is home to a historic bridge over the Murray River. Constructed in 1925, the bridge was designed to rise to let paddle steamers through. In 1974, the paddle steamer "Pevensey" collided with the bridge after passing through the open bridge heading upstream. The steamer attempted to move to the south bank after clearing the bridge, but was caught in the strong current and swept sideways into the east side of the bridge. The bridge sustained no noticeable damage, but the "Pevensey" suffered some damage to her upper works. After being pulled off by a team of locals who were gathered to see her come through the bridge, the "Pevensey" refueled and made minor repairs, before heading upstream to Echuca.

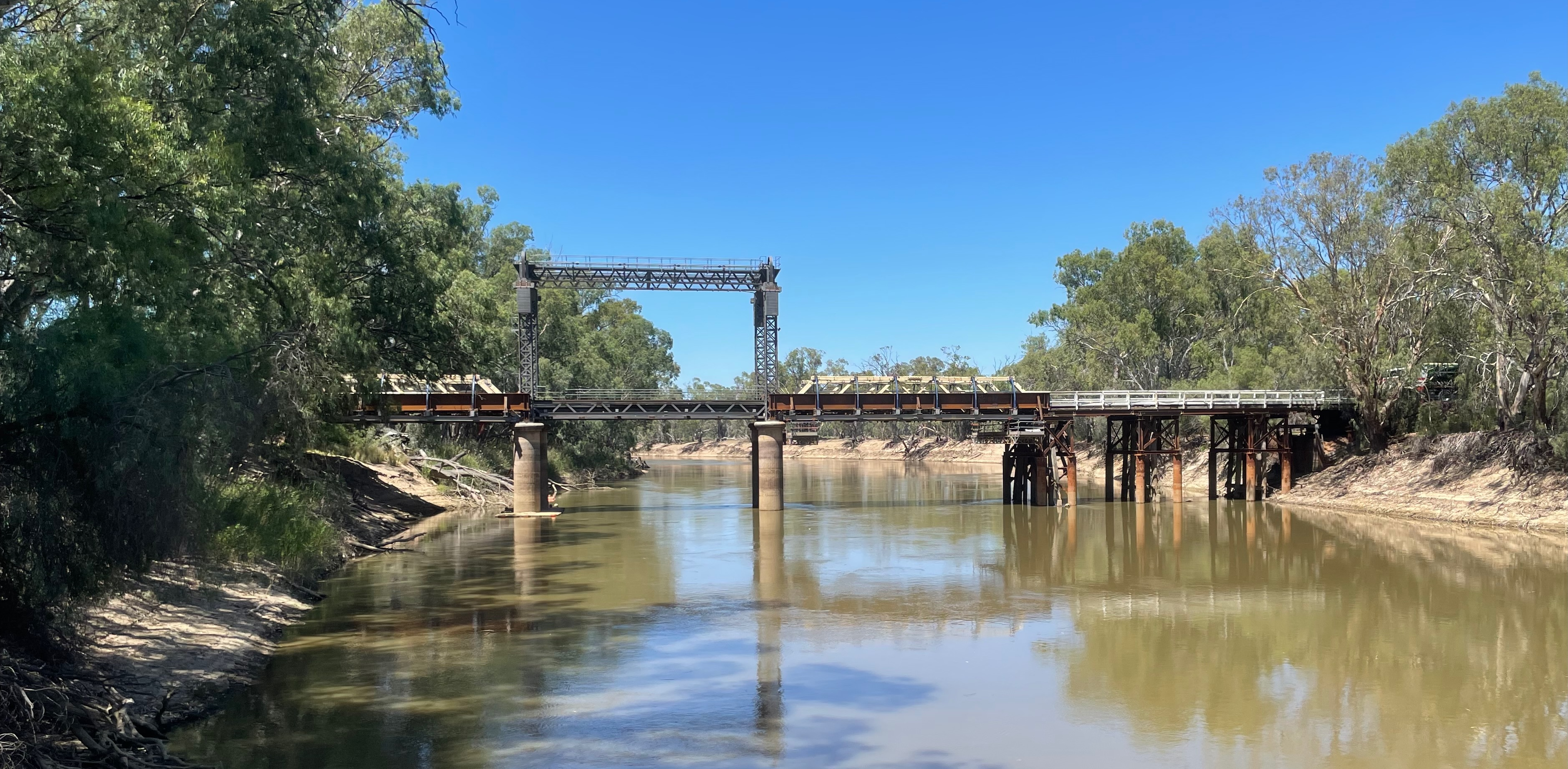
The 1925 bridge uses a timber Allan truss with a steel lift span to permit paddle steamers and other river traffic to pass.

== Culture ==
The town in conjunction with nearby township Manangatang has an Australian rules football team competing in the Central Murray Football League. The town first established a football team in 1903, in the Lines Football Association. This became the Nyah-Piangil Football Association soon after, and Tooleybuc won its first Premiership in 1923, defeating Woorinen by 1 point. As a member of the Mid Valley Football Association, Tooleybuc won the Premiership in 1935. The Association became the Mid-Murray Football League, and Tooleybuc made the Grand Final on six occasions, but only managed one Premiership, when they defeated Lalbert by 32 points in 1965. In 1997, a re-organisation of football leagues in the area resulted in the creation of the Central Murray Football League. In 2004 the Tooleybuc and Manangatang football clubs merged to form the Saints. The senior team lost the Grand Final to Kerang Football Club in 2004, and won the Premiership in 2007, defeating Balranald Football Club by 45 points. In the 2011 season, the Saints won the Reserves and Under-15 Premierships.

Tooleybuc Central School is a K-12 school. It began as a primary school in 1916, and in 1952 surrounding small schools were absorbed into it to form the Central School. It has students from the NSW towns of Kyalite, Goodnight and Koraleigh, as well as farm areas within that range. It also serves students from Victoria, especially for high school, for the towns and localities of Nyah, Nyah West, Wood Wood, Piangil, Natya, Kooloonong and surrounding areas.
