= Niemur River =

Coordinates: 35°08′S 143°42′E

Location
- Country: Australia
- State: New South Wales
- Region: IBRA: Riverina
- District: Riverina
- Municipalities: Murray, Deniliquin, Wakool

Physical characteristics
- Source: Edward River
  - location: near Moonahcullah
  - elevation: 92 m (302 ft)
- Mouth: confluence with the Wakool River
  - location: north of Swan Hill
  - elevation: 63 m (207 ft)
- Length: 155 km (96 mi)

Basin features
- River system: Murray River, Murray–Darling basin

Niemur River, a perennial stream of the Murray catchment and part of the Murray–Darling basin, is located in the western Riverina region of south western New South Wales, Australia.

The river leaves Edward River, near Moonahcullah, flowing generally west north-west, joined by five minor tributaries, before reaching its confluence with the Wakool River, north of Swan Hill, descending 29 metres (95 ft) over its 155 kilometres (96 mi) course.

== See also ==
- List of rivers of New South Wales
- List of rivers of Australia
