= Mallan, New South Wales =

Mallan
- Town
- Coordinates: 35°7′44″S 143°47′43″E
- Country: Australia
- State: New South Wales
- Region: Murray River

Government
  - Federal division: Farrer

Population
  - Total: 53, (2016 census)
- Time zone: UTC+10 (AEST)
  - Summer (DST): UTC+11 (AEDT)
- Postcode: 2734

Mallan is a locality in the Murray River Council, New South Wales, Australia. It is located approximately 690 km from Sydney and covers an area of some 320 square kilometers.

== Heritage listings ==
The Coonamit Bridge over Wakool River on Swan Hill Road that connects Mallan with neighbouring Dilpurra is listed on the New South Wales State Heritage Register.
