= Murray River road bridge, Swan Hill =

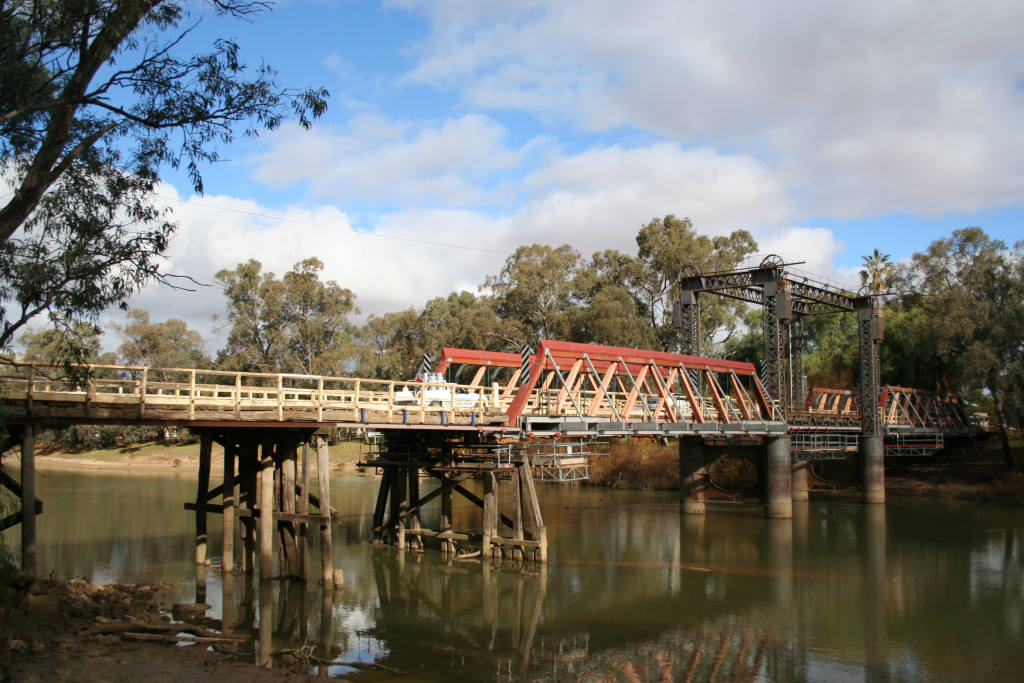
- The bridge, in 2006
- Coordinates: 35°20′16″S 143°33′46″E
- Carries: Swan Hill Road: Motor vehicles; Pedestrians
- Crosses: Murray River
- Locale: Murray Downs, New South Wales, Australia
- Begins: Murray Downs, New South Wales
- Ends: Swan Hill, Victoria
- Other names: Swan Hill Bridge; Swan Hill-Murray River Road Bridge; Swan Hill Lift Bridge
- Owner: Transport for NSW
- Preceded by: Gonn Crossing Bridge
- Followed by: Speewa Ferry

Characteristics
- Design: Allan truss with lift span
- Material: Timber and riveted lattice steel
- Trough construction: Timber
- Pier construction: Timber and cast iron
- Longest span: 27.9 metres (92 ft)
- No. of spans: 3
- No. of lanes: One, on lift span; Two, on approaches

History
- Designer: Percy Allan
- Opened: 1896

New South Wales Heritage Register
- Official name: Swan Hill-Murray River Road Bridge; Murray River road bridge, Swan Hill
- Type: State heritage (built)
- Designated: 20 June 2000
- Reference no.: 1481
- Type: Road Bridge
- Category: Transport – Land

Location
- Interactive map of Murray River road bridge, Swan Hill

The Murray River road bridge is a heritage-listed road bridge that carries Swan Hill Road across the Murray River, on the border between New South Wales and Victoria, Australia. The bridge connects Murray Downs in New South Wales with McCallum Street in Swan Hill, Victoria. The bridge was built in 1896 and is owned by Transport for NSW. The bridge is also called the Swan Hill Bridge and the Swan Hill-Murray River Road Bridge. It was added to the New South Wales State Heritage Register on 20 June 2000.

== History ==
Sir Thomas Mitchell, the Surveyor General named Swan Hill when he camped there in 1836 on the wide Murray Plain. Mitchell's head is today the crest of Swan Hill. This area was settled in the subsequent decade in very large stations: on the New South Wales side of the river, Murray Downs under Bell and Wilson covered 60,000 hectares (150,000 acres) and by the 1860s, under H. S. Officer, was carrying 6000 sheep. On the Victorian side, the principal runs were Tyntynder and Mercers Vale, established by the Beveridge family as cattle stations. Because of this pastoral development a punt was installed at Swan Hill as early as 1846. In 1853, when the first two steamers on the river, the Lady Augusta and Mary Ann raced up the river, both stopped at Swan Hill and the Campbell family mounted a ball for the passengers and crew while their wool-clip was loaded. Swan Hill developed wharfage and in the 1860s had two hotels and three stores but only eleven houses. The town continued to develop as a crucial centre for the river trade, overlanding and interstate commerce, with hotels on both sides of the river adjacent to the punt.

The Victorian railway reached Swan Hill in 1889 and the need for a bridge was more and more recognised. A lift span bridge, allowing the passage of the river-boats, which were still numerous in this area, was planned in 1895 and opened in 1896. The bridge is still in use: Swan Hill, with good road, rail and water links, reached a population of 4,000 by 1948, remains the focus of a large area of diversified farming and attracts many tourists to its open-air museum.

== Description ==
Swan Hill Bridge is a timber truss, steel lift span bridge across the Murray River at Swan Hill. The main axis of the bridge is east – west. There are three main spans including one lift span supported on cast iron cylindrical piers. On the northern side there are three approach spans, and on the southern side there is one.

The two main truss spans are 27.9-metre (92 ft) Allan trusses, with timber cross girders. The main stringers have been replaced with steel I-sections. The deck is timber. The 17.8-metre (58 ft) lift span superstructure is constructed with riveted lattice steel. The lifting layout was also developed by Percy Allan. The deck of the lift span is also timber, and traffic is restricted to one lane across the lift span. The approach spans of 10.4 to 10.8 metres (34 to 35 ft) timber girders supporting a timber deck. Piers are timber trestles, including the junctions with the main spans.

There is a footway added on the upstream side, using steel beams. this has resulted in modification of the top chord stabilising angles to the Allan trusses.

=== Condition ===
As at 23 June 2005, the bridge is described as being in fair condition as it has had major rehabilitation in recent years. One truss span was repaired in May 1998.

Transport for NSW issued a community update entitled "Planning for a future Murray River crossing at Swan Hill in September 2020.

A new bridge is now under construction about 110 metres south (upstream) of the existing Swan Hill Bridge. The bridge is about 192 metres long and has two traffic lanes, one in each direction. There is a shared pedestrian and cyclist path. There are three sets of piers within the Murray River and a lift span over the navigation channel to provide access under the bridge for large river craft.

== Heritage listing ==
As at 23 June 2005, Swan Hill Bridge is significant under all four criteria - historical, aesthetic, technical, and social. The significance of the bridge lies in its form, setting and materials. The presence of the lift span is important. The appropriate level of significance in NSW is State and likely of national significance. The form and setting have high aesthetic and social significance. The superstructure construction - Allan timber trusses and Allan lift span have very high significance in the detail and materials. The bridge is the original of its type, and extremely rare (there is one other example at Tooleybuc).

Swan Hill-Murray River Road Bridge was listed on the New South Wales State Heritage Register on 20 June 2000 having satisfied the following criteria.

The place is important in demonstrating the course, or pattern, of cultural or natural history in New South Wales.

The Swan Hill Bridge is historically very significant. It is hard to differentiate between historical and technical significance in this instance as they are closely intertwined. This bridge has great importance for its association with Percy Allan, who is respected as the outstanding bridge engineer in NSW. In his 46 years in the Public Service he designed over 550 bridges, including several outstanding structures. Swan Hill Bridge was one of his major works, and a significant advancement in technology. He was extremely proud of this bridge and prepared a technical paper on it. The bridge demonstrates a major step in the evolving pattern of our moveable bridge history.

The place is important in demonstrating aesthetic characteristics and/or a high degree of creative or technical achievement in New South Wales.

The Swan Hill Bridge has aesthetic significance due to its outstanding setting and landmark qualities. The bridge provides a gateway to NSW from the major urban area of Swan Hill. It is a focus of the town to the river, which it dominates by its size and mass. The setting within the town of a lift bridge is rare, being only duplicated (with RTA bridges) at Tooleybuc.

The place has strong or special association with a particular community or cultural group in New South Wales for social, cultural or spiritual reasons.

The Swan Hill Bridge has high significance in the Swan Hill / Wakool District as the main urban link across the river and the focus of movements across the river, controlling access of people and commerce. The river is the centre of social and recreational region, and the Swan Hill Bridge is the centre of this area. It is considered an important element in the region by the local people, although there is concern at its perceived traffic inadequacies.

=== Engineering heritage award ===
The bridge received a Historic Engineering Marker from Engineers Australia as part of its Engineering Heritage Recognition Program.

=== National Trust heritage list ===
Despite the bridge being located in New South Wales, on 6 July 1998, the Victorian branch of the National Trust of Australia added the bridge to their non-statutory list of heritage properties.

== See also ==
- List of crossings of the Murray River
- List of bridges in Australia

Next bridge upstream	Murray River	Next bridge downstream
Gonn Crossing Bridge	Murray River road bridge, Swan Hill	Speewa Ferry
