= Tantonan =

Tantonan New South Wales
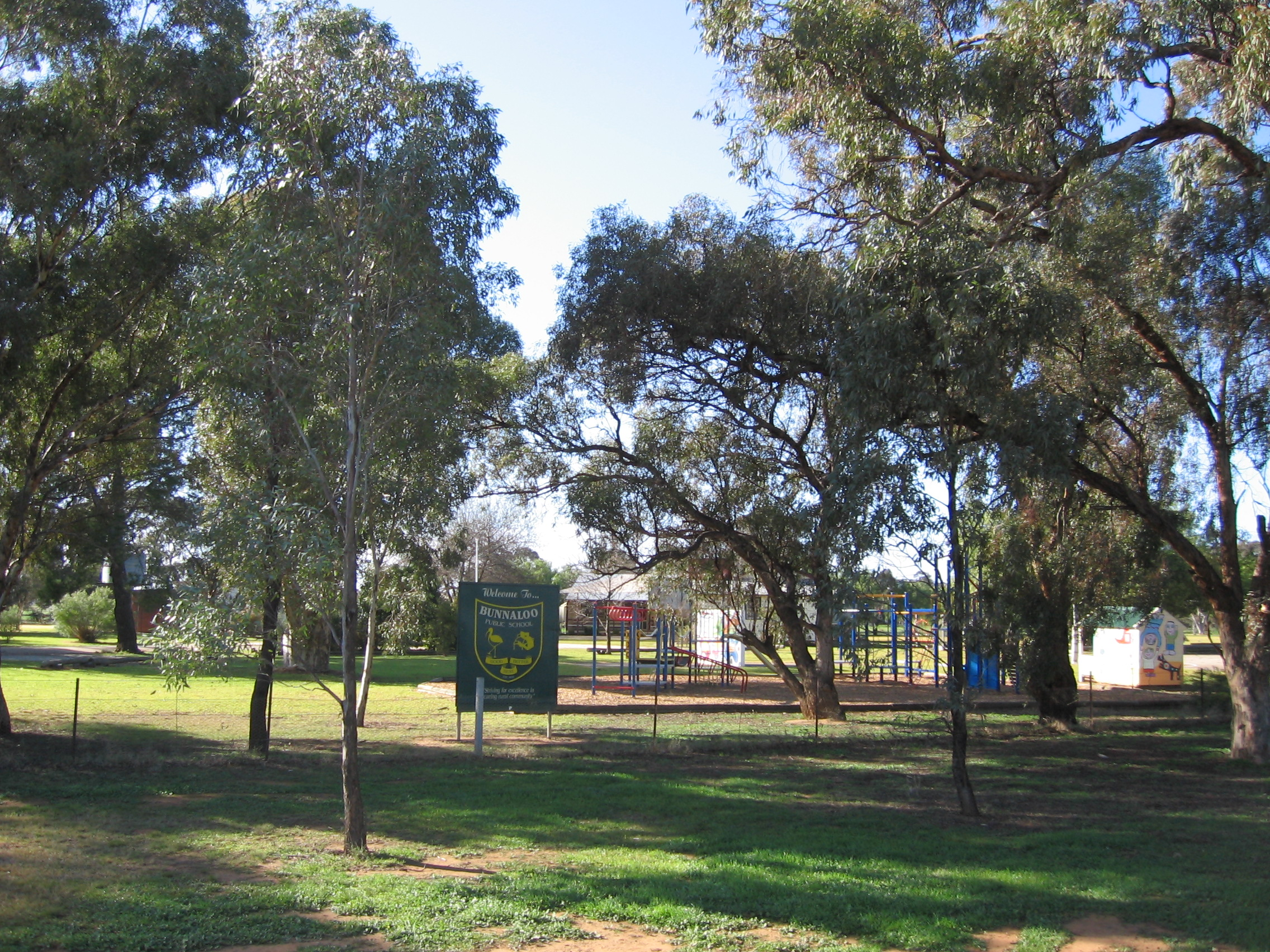
- Education in Tantonan is provided by Bunnaloo Public School

- Coordinates: 35°42′S 144°33′E
- Population: 15 (SAL 2021)
- Postcode(s): 2731
- Location: 8 km (5 mi) from Caldwell; 13 km (8 mi) from Bunnaloo
- LGA(s): Murray River Council
- County: Cadell
- State electorate(s): Murray
- Federal division(s): Farrer

Tantonan is a rural locality in the central south part of the Riverina, New South Wales, Australia. It is situated by road, about 8 kilometres north west from Caldwell and 13 kilometres south east from Bunnaloo.

Tantonan Post Office opened on 21 June 1926 and closed in 1962.

Local education is provided by the Bunnaloo Public School.
