= Koraleigh =

Koraleigh New South Wales
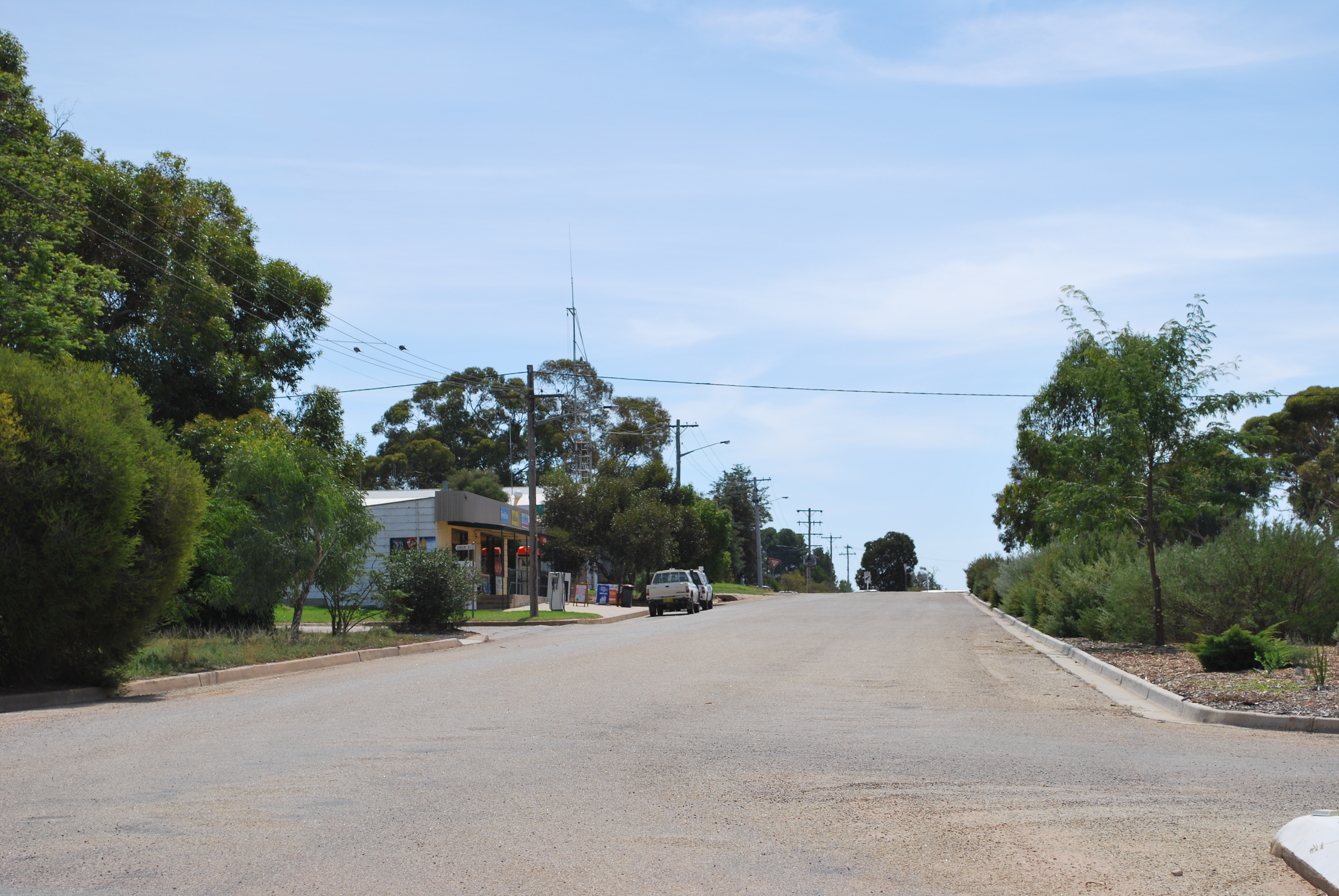
- Main street

- Coordinates: 35°07′S 143°26′E
- Population: 373 (2006 census)
- Postcode(s): 2735
- Location: 374 km (232 mi) NW of Melbourne; 921 km (572 mi) SW of Sydney; 32 km (20 mi) NW of Swan Hill; 4 km (2 mi) E of Nyah, Victoria
- LGA(s): Murray River Council
- County: Wakool
- State electorate(s): Murray
- Federal division(s): Farrer

Koraleigh is a small village in the west of the Riverina region of New South Wales, Australia. The village is on the Murray River and in Murray River Council local government area. Koraleigh is 6 kilometres (3.7 mi) northeast of Nyah, Victoria and 15 kilometres (9.3 mi) south of Tooleybuc.

Koraleigh is on the traditional lands of the Muthi Muthi Aboriginal tribe and it is from their language that it gets its name.

At the 2006 census, Koraleigh had a population of 373.

Koraleigh Post Office opened on 18 September 1922. In the late 1980s, the Post Office moved from its original location in Eagles Lane and was integrated into the town's only store.

== Gallery ==
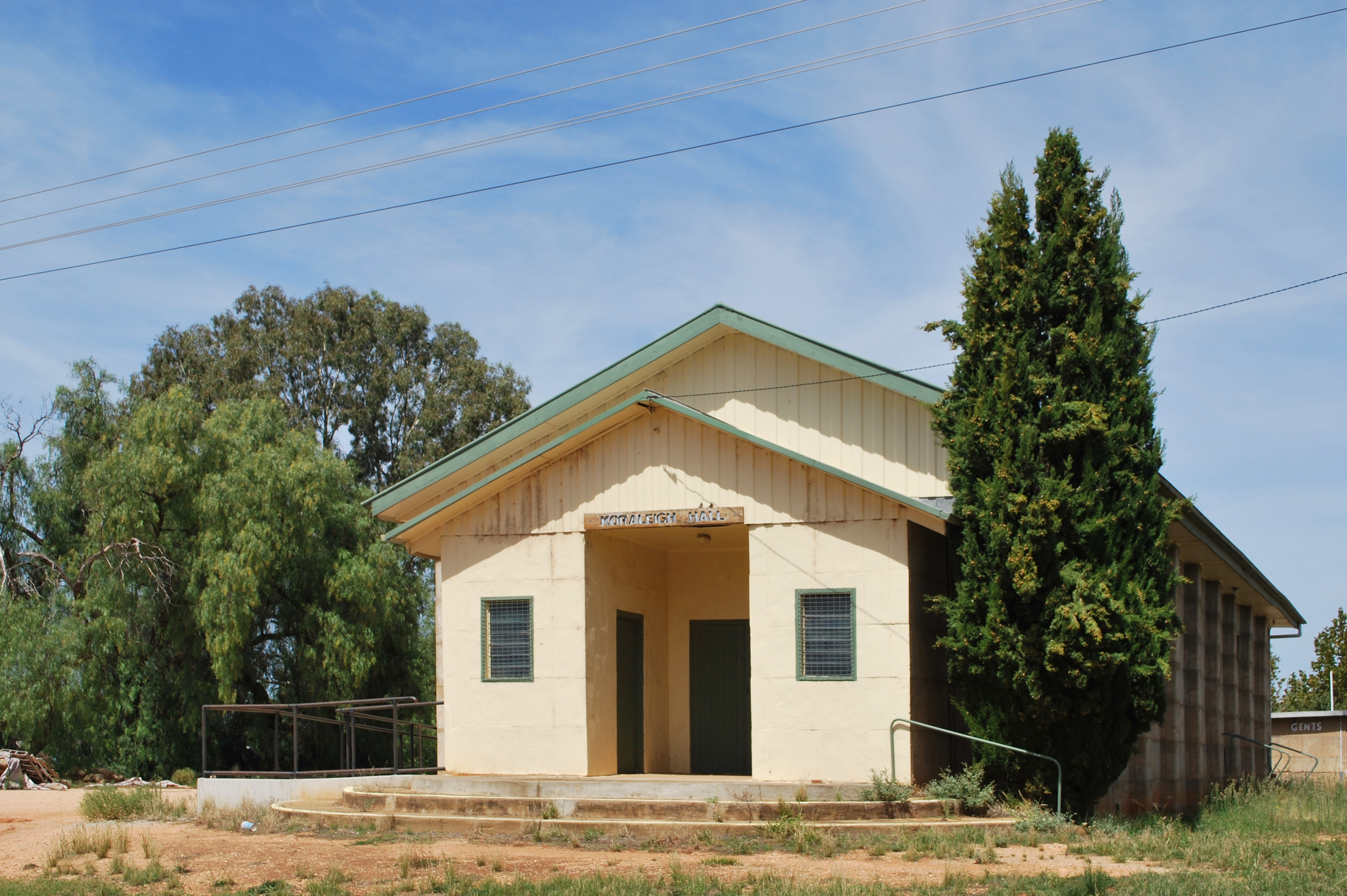
Public hall

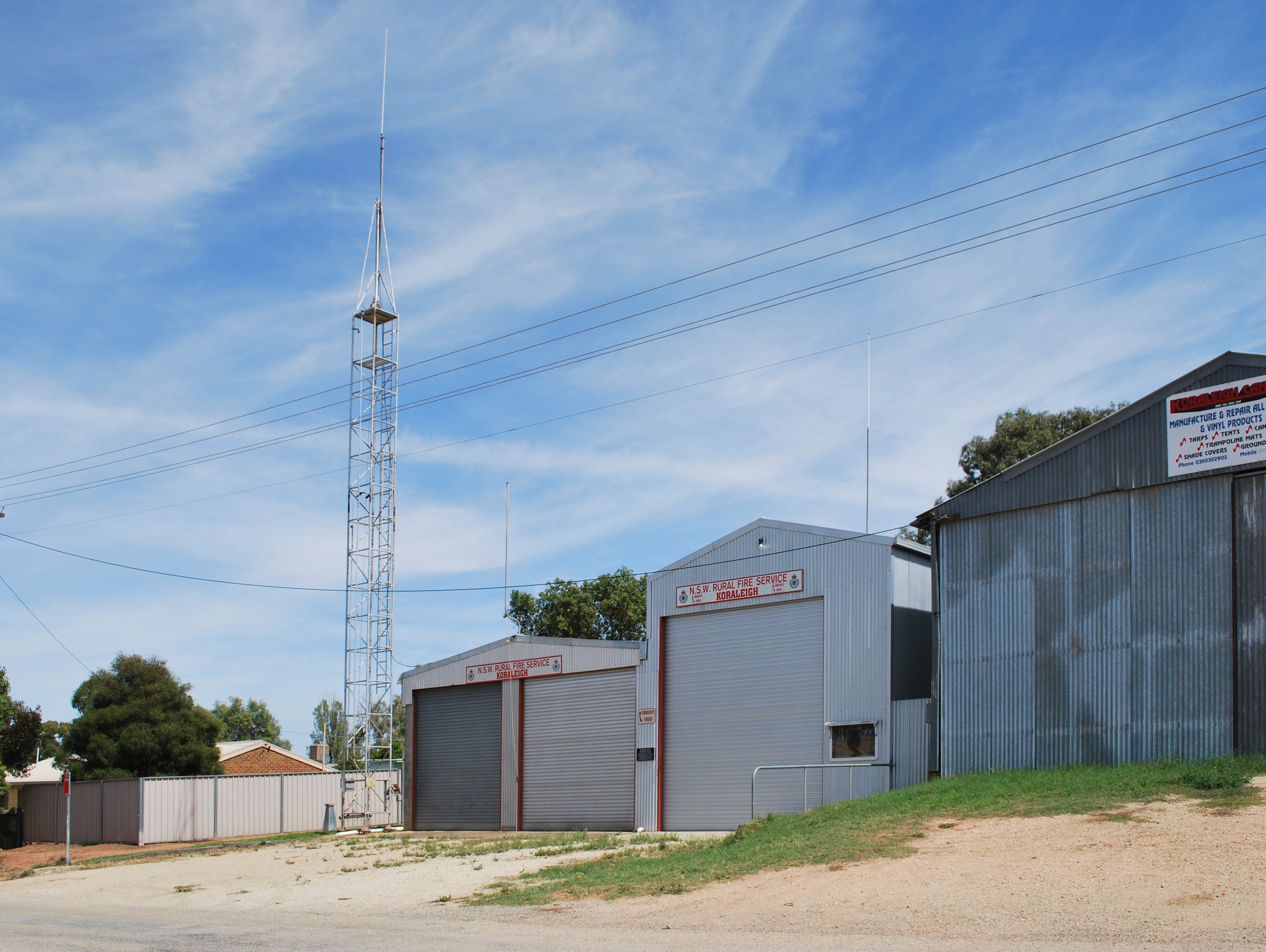
RFS shed

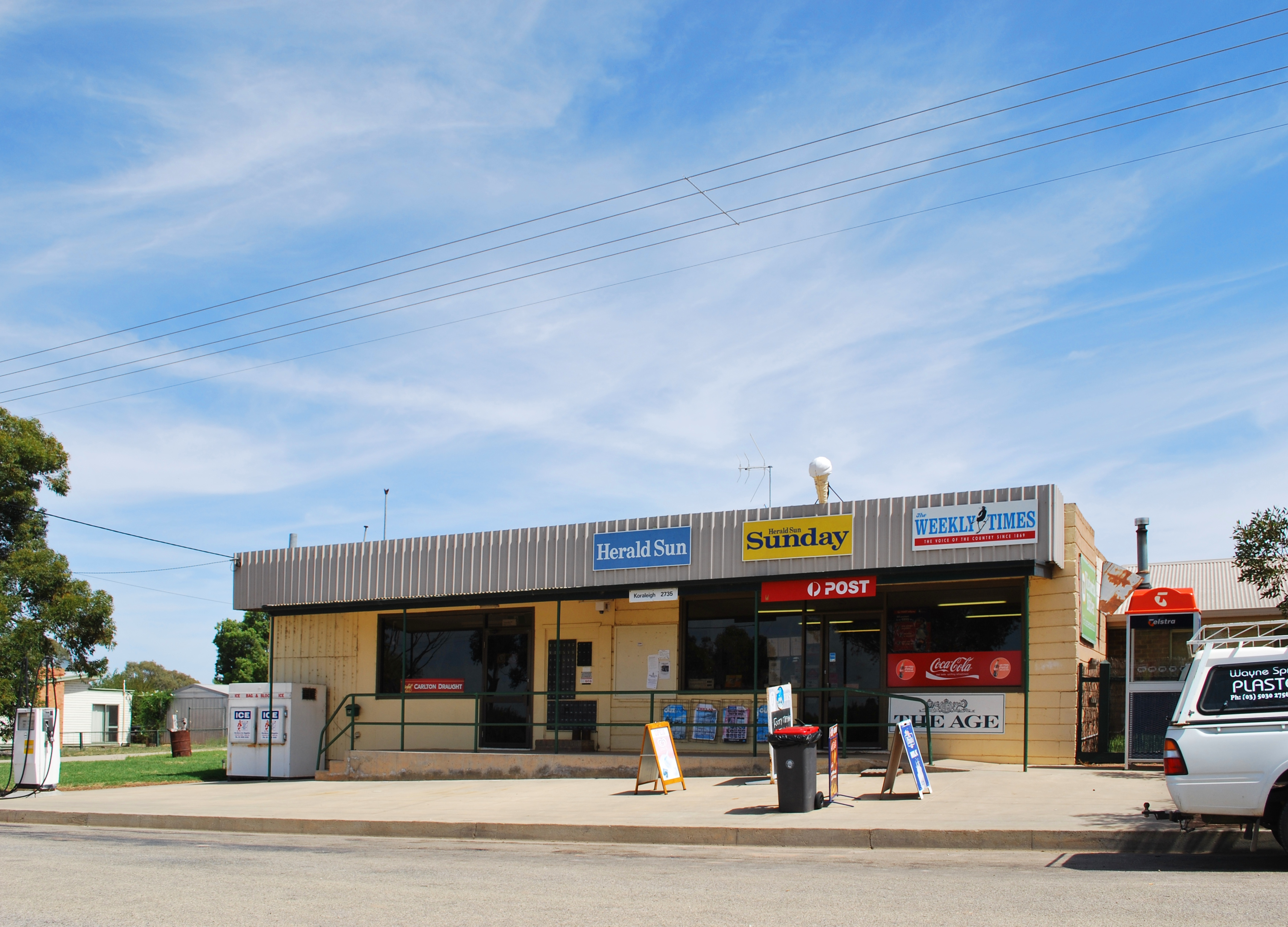
General store
