= Bob Lane (Australian footballer) =

Personal information
- Full name: Robert John Lane
- Nickname: Rocky
- Born: 12 December 1946; Kerang, Victoria
- Died: 13 July 1979 (aged 32); Kyalite, New South Wales
- Original team: Kerang
- Height: 188 cm (6 ft 2 in)
- Weight: 85 kg (187 lb)

Playing career^{1}
Years	Club	Games (Goals)
1966	Carlton	2 (0)
- ^{1} Playing statistics correct to the end of 1966.

Robert John "Rocky" Lane (12 December 1946 – 13 July 1979) was a Victorian police detective who was murdered in the line of duty. He was also an Australian rules footballer who played two senior games with Carlton in the Victorian Football League (VFL).

== Family ==
The son of George Walter Lane (1910-1968), and Eliza Jean Lane (1915-1977), née Lane, Robert John Lane was born at Kerang, Victoria on 12 December 1946.

Lane was married with two children.

== Football ==
=== Carlton (VFL) ===
Lane, who hailed from Kerang, had joined the Victoria Police before he was recruited to Carlton. Former teammates remember him turning up to training in his police uniform. He managed only the briefest of opportunities at the VFL level, coming on late in the last quarter in both of his appearances.

=== Williamstown (VFA) ===
He transferred to Williamstown in the Second Division of the VFA in 1967. His employment meant that he could only play from time to time. In all he played in 39 games, scored 36 goals, over seven seasons (1967-1971, 1974, 1975), including the team that defeated Sunshine, in the Second Division VFA Grand Final, at Toorak Park, on 14 September 1969.

=== Country football ===
He later transferred to the country as his police career progressed. Lane was captain-coach of Lake Boga and, later, Lalbert, in the Mid Murray Football League.

== Death ==
On 13 July 1979, while working as a detective senior constable with Victoria Police, Lane accompanied Daniel Bernard Chapman (who was suspected of stealing a police car) to a campsite across the state border at Kyalite, New South Wales. While Lane was searching the caravan, Chapman shot Lane twice in the head, with a rifle that he (Chapman) had hidden, killing Lane instantly.

Following a massive manhunt, involving both Victorian and New South Wales police, the suspect was apprehended seven days later, after he had dumped the police car in the river. He was tried, convicted of murder, and (on 1 July 1980) sentenced to life in prison, and was released 13 years later.

== See also ==
- Kyalite § Murder of policeman
