= Gee Gee Bridge =

- Coordinates: 35°19′47″S 143°55′40″E
- Carries: Noorong Road
- Crosses: Wakool River
- Locale: New South Wales, Australia
- Begins: Cunninyeuk
- Ends: Wetuppa
- Owner: Murray River Council

Characteristics
- Design: Dare-type Allan truss
- Material: Timber
- Pier construction: Timber
- Total length: 72.5 metres (238 ft)
- Width: 5.5 metres (18 ft)
- Longest span: 27.7 metres (91 ft)
- No. of spans: 1
- No. of lanes: 2

History
- Engineering design by: Harvey Dare
- Construction end: 1929

Former New South Wales Heritage Register
- Official name: Gee Gee Bridge over Wakool River (Revoked)
- Type: State heritage (built)
- Designated: 20 June 2000
- Delisted: 2 March 2018
- Reference no.: 1469
- Type: Road Bridge
- Category: Transport – Land

The Gee Gee Bridge was a heritage-listed road bridge that carried Noorong Road across the Wakool River, connecting Cunninyeuk with Wetuppa in New South Wales, Australia. The bridge was designed by Harvey Dare and opened in 1929. Owned by the Murray River Council it was replaced by a concrete structure in May 2020 and demolished.

== History ==
Timber truss road bridges have played a significant role in the expansion and improvement of the NSW road network. Prior to the bridges being built, river crossings were often dangerous in times of rain, which caused bulk freight movement to be prohibitively expensive for most agricultural and mining produce. Only the high priced wool clip of the time was able to carry the costs and inconvenience imposed by the generally inadequate river crossings that often existed prior to the trusses construction. Timber truss bridges were preferred by the Public Works Department from the mid 19th to the early 20th century because they were relatively cheap to construct, and used mostly local materials. The financially troubled governments of the day applied pressure to the Public Works Department to produce as much road and bridge work for as little cost as possible, using local materials. This condition effectively prohibited the use of iron and steel, as these, prior to the construction of the BHP steel works at Newcastle in the early 20th century, had to be imported from England.

Harvey Dare, the designer of Dare truss and other bridges, was a leading engineer in the Public Works Department, and a prominent figure in early 20th century NSW.

Timber truss bridges, and timber bridges generally were so common that NSW was known to travellers as the "timber bridge state".

The 1929 bridge was replaced under the Roads & Maritime Services Timber Truss Bridge Strategy. The old bridge was demolished as part of the replacement. Work commenced in September 2018 with the new bridge opened in May 2020. The original bridge was subsequently demolished.

== Description ==
Gee Gee Bridge was a Dare-type timber Allan truss road bridge. It has a single timber truss span of 27.7 metres (91 ft). There are three timber approach spans at one end and two at the other giving the bridge an overall length of 72.5 metres (238 ft).

The super structure was supported by timber trestles and provided a dual-lane carriage way with a minimum width of 5.5 metres (18 ft). A timber post and rail guard rail extended the full length of the bridge. In the 1990s strengthening of the timber trestles took place.
