= Murray River Council =

- Local government area
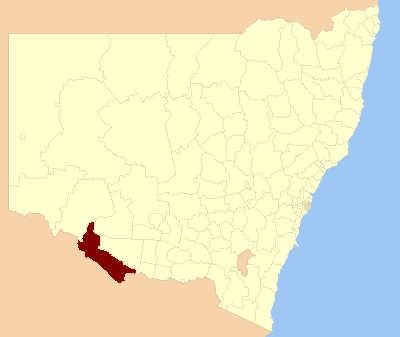
- Location in New South Wales

- Interactive map of Murray River Council
- Coordinates: 35°24′S 144°19′E
- Country: Australia
- State: New South Wales
- Region: Riverina
- Established: 12 May 2016

Government
  - Mayor: John Harvey (Ind. Liberal)
  - State electorate: Murray
  - Federal division: Farrer

Area
  - Total: 11,865 km^{2} (4,581 sq mi)

Population
  - Totals: 11,680 (2016 census); 12,118 (2018 est.)
  - Density: 0.9844/km^{2} (2.5496/sq mi)
- Website: Murray River Council
LGAs around Murray River Council
Balranald	Hay	Edward River
Swan Hill (Victoria)	Murray River Council	Berrigan
Gannawarra Shire(Victoria)	Campaspe Shire (Victoria)	Moira (Victoria)

The Murray River Council is a local government area in the Riverina region of New South Wales, Australia. This area was formed in 2016 from the merger of Murray Shire with Wakool Shire.

The combined area comprises 11,865 square kilometres (4,581 sq mi) and covers the northern bank of the Murray River and hinterland from Moama downstream to Tooleybuc. At the time of its establishment, the estimated population of the area was 11,456.

== Main towns and villages ==
The largest town in Murray River Council is Moama in the far south east. Other towns and localities in the area include Barham, Bunnaloo, Burraboi, Caldwell, Cunninyeuk, Koraleigh, Kyalite, Mathoura, Moulamein, Murray Downs, Speewa, Tantonan, Tooleybuc, Wakool and Womboota.

== Council ==
Murray River Council

Type
- Type: Unicameral

History
- Founded: 12 May 2016
- Preceded by: Murray Shire Council; Wakool Shire Council

Leadership
- Mayor: John Harvey, Independent Liberal since October 2024
- Deputy Mayor: Neil Gorey, Independent since October 2024

Structure
- Seats: 9 (3 wards)
- Length of term: 4 years (renewable)

Elections
- First election: 2016
- Last election: 2024

Meeting place
- Moama Council Chambers; 52 Perricoota Road, Moama; New South Wales

The Administrator of the Murray River Council from 2016 to September 2017 was David Shaw.

Murray River Council has nine councillors elected proportionally from three wards – Moama, Greater Murray and Greater Wakool. All councillors are elected for a fixed four-year term of office.

== Election results ==
=== 2024 ===
2024 New South Wales local elections: Murray River
Party	Votes	%	Swing	Seats	Change
Independent					
Independent Liberal					
Formal votes					
Informal votes					
Total				9	

== Main towns in shire ==
In 2021 census the shire had a population of 12,850.

Population
Locality	2016	2021
Barham	1,159	1,569
Bunnaloo	101	107
Burraboi	63	196
Caldwell	33	42
Cunninyeuk	37	24
Dilpurra	22	29
Koraleigh	353	291
Kyalite	82	87
Mallan	53	45

Population
Locality	2016	2021
Mathoura	938	1,002
Moama	5,620	7,213
Moulamein	484	489
Murray Downs	265	274
Speewa	98	115
Stony Crossing	17	27
Tantonan	24	15
Tooleybuc	277	336
Wakool	297	262
Womboota	105	90

== Heritage listings ==
The Murray River Council has a number of heritage-listed sites, including:

- Barham, 319 Main Road: Barham Bridge over Murray River
- Cunninyeuk, 94 Noorong Road (Main Road): Gee Gee Bridge over Wakool River
- Moama, Hunt Street: Moama Historic Precinct
- Swan Hill, 386 Main Road: Coonamit Bridge over Wakool River
- Swan Hill, 67 Main Road (East): Swan Hill-Murray River Road Bridge
- Tooleybuc, 222 Main Road: Tooleybuc Bridge
- Wakool, Moulamein Highway: Murray Downs Homestead

== See also ==
- Local government areas of New South Wales
