= Murray Downs =

Murray Downs New South Wales
- Coordinates: 35°20′31″S 143°36′0″E
- Population: 265 (2016 census)
- Postcode(s): 2734
- LGA(s): Murray River Council
- State electorate(s): Murray
- Federal division(s): Farrer

Murray Downs is a locality in the Murray River Council, New South Wales, Australia. It is directly across the border from Swan Hill.

== Heritage listings ==
The Murray River road bridge over the Murray River connects Swan Hill Road in Murray Downs to Swan Hill in Victoria. The bridge is listed on the New South Wales State Heritage Register.

== Recreation ==
The Murray Downs Golf and Country Club has a 18 hole golf course and also a green for Lawn bowls.
