= Kyalite =

Kyalite New South Wales
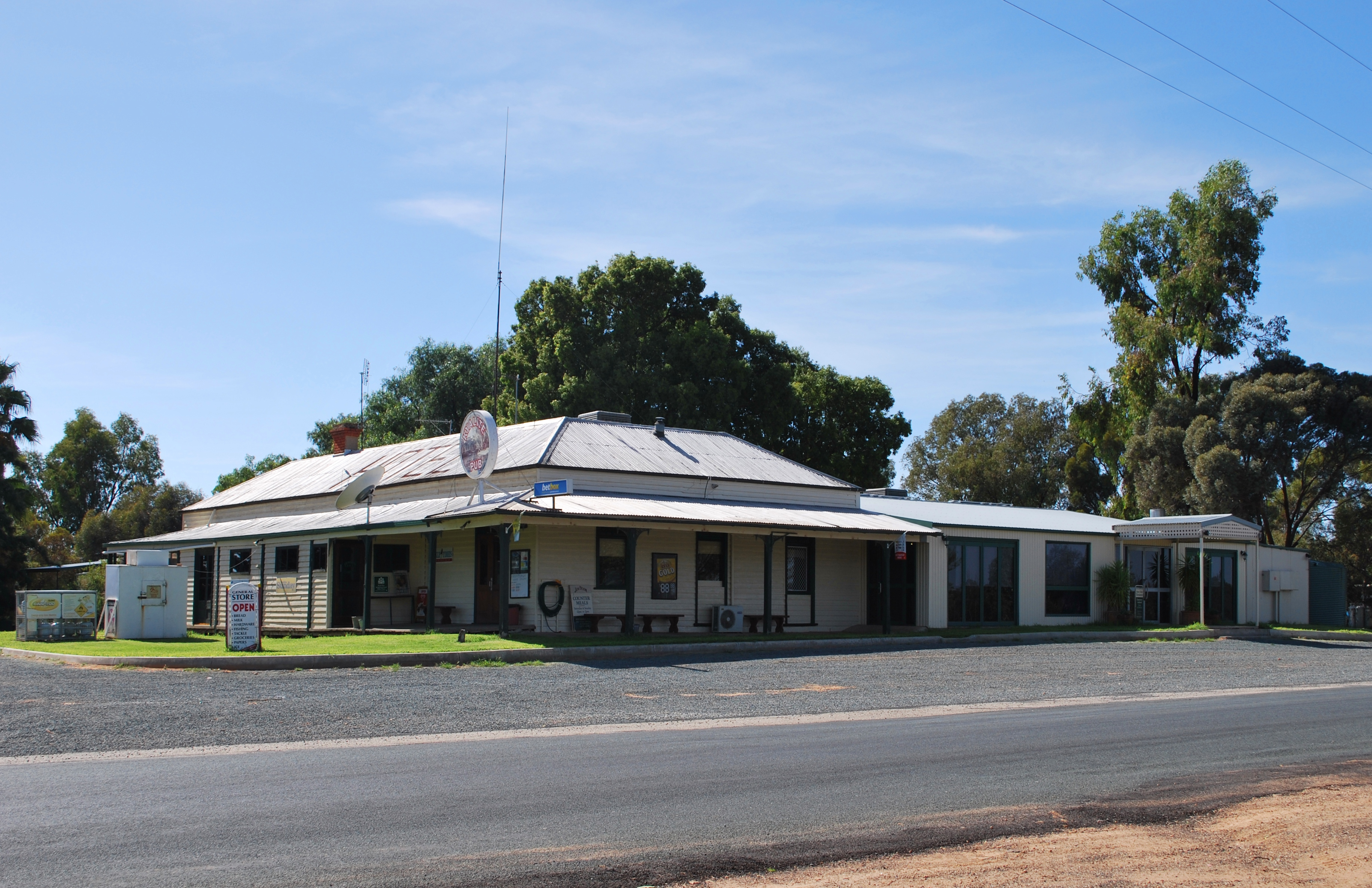
- Wakool Hotel at Kyalite

- Coordinates: 34°57′0″S 143°29′6″E
- Population: 87 (SAL 2021)
- Postcode(s): 2734
- Elevation: 68 m (223 ft)
- Location: 883 km (549 mi) W of Sydney; 405 km (252 mi) NW of Melbourne; 56 km (35 mi) N of Swan Hill; 37 km (23 mi) N of Balranald
- LGA(s): Balranald Shire, Murray River Council
- County: Caira
- State electorate(s): Murray
- Federal division(s): Farrer

Kyalite is a locality on the Wakool River in the Riverina district of the Australian state of New South Wales. It is part of Balranald Shire and is approximately 890 kilometres (550 mi) south west of the state capital Sydney and 400 kilometres (250 mi) north west of Melbourne. Kyalite was formerly known as Wakool Crossing. At the 2021 census, Kyalite had a population of 87.

== History ==
Kyalite lies within the traditional country of the Muthi Muthi Aboriginal people.

=== Wakool Crossing ===
The village of Wakool Crossing (the site of present-day Kyalite) was founded by Henry Talbett, who in about 1848 established a punt service across the Wakool River at the location. When he became established Talbett brought out his family from Ireland, including his parents and siblings. His brother John came to Wakool Crossing with his family and assisted Henry Talbett to construct an inn and a general store on land Henry had purchased near his punt. The punt was operated by Harry and Agnes Edwards. Agnes was named "Queen Aggie" in a ceremony in nearby Swan Hill to mark the British coronation. Their descendants include musician Kutcha Edwards.

In 1854 John Talbett was the licensee of the Wakool Inn.

In 1860 Henry Talbett was the licensee of the Wakool Inn.

Henry Talbett held the licence of the Wakool Hotel between 1865 and at least 1870.

In 1882 Talbett sold the hotel to Thomas Spinks who held the licence until his death in January 1890.

In 1890 the publican of the Wakool Hotel was listed as John James, a co-executor of Thomas's will and father in law of Thomas's daughter, Hannah.

From 1891 to 1893 it was John Spinks, he was Thomas's only son.

The original hotel was burnt down and re-built in 1890 by the Spinks family.

The hotel licence was transferred from John Spinks to Lewis James, the husband of Hannah, in August 1893.

The property was later owned by a Mr. Peppin (Pappin) whose family still reside in the region.

Wakool Crossing Post Office opened on 1 June 1911 and was renamed Kyalite in 1927.

The railway reached Kyalite in 1928, when it became a station on the railway line from Kerang, Victoria, across the Murray River to Stony Crossing, New South Wales. The line was not a success and trains ceased running north of the Murray in 1943.

In 1976 Kyalite was described in the following terms: "It… consists of a Post Office, Public Hall, General Store (with petrol pumps), Hotel, tennis courts, cricket oval, about five private houses and has 66 persons on the Electoral Roll".

== Burke and Wills ==
On 13 September 1860 the Burke and Wills expedition to the Gulf of Carpentaria arrived at Wakool Crossing and dined at Henry Talbett's hotel. The next day they crossed the Wakool River by Talbett’s punt and Burke paid £9.6.0 "for portage, provisions &c.".

== Murder of policeman ==
On 13 July 1979, while working as a Detective Senior Constable, Bob Lane, of the Victoria Police, accompanied a suspect from Piangil to a campsite across the state border at Kyalite. While searching the suspect's bus, the suspect, Daniel Bernard Chapman, shot Lane twice in the head with a rifle that he had hidden, killing him instantly. Following a massive manhunt involving both Victorian and New South Wales police, Chapman was apprehended seven days later after he had dumped the police car in the river, and was sentenced to life in prison. He was released just 13 years later.
