= Dilpurra, New South Wales =

Dilpurra
- Town
- Coordinates: 35°12′S 143°42′E
- Country: Australia
- State: New South Wales
- LGA: Murray River Council
- Location: 57 km (35 mi) from Moulamein; 15 km (9.3 mi) from Swan Hill

Government
  - State electorate: Murray
  - Federal division: Farrer

Population
  - Total: 29 (SAL 2021)
- Postcode: 2734
- County: Wakool

Dilpurra is a village community in the south western part of the Riverina in New South Wales, Australia.

== Geography ==
Dilpurra is situated about 57 kilometres west of Moulamein and 15 kilometres north of Swan Hill, Victoria.

== Heritage listings ==
The Coonamit Bridge over Wakool River on Swan Hill Road that connects Dilpurra with neighbouring Mallan is listed on the New South Wales State Heritage Register.
