= Tooleybuc Bridge =

Bridge crossing Murray River in Victoria, Australia

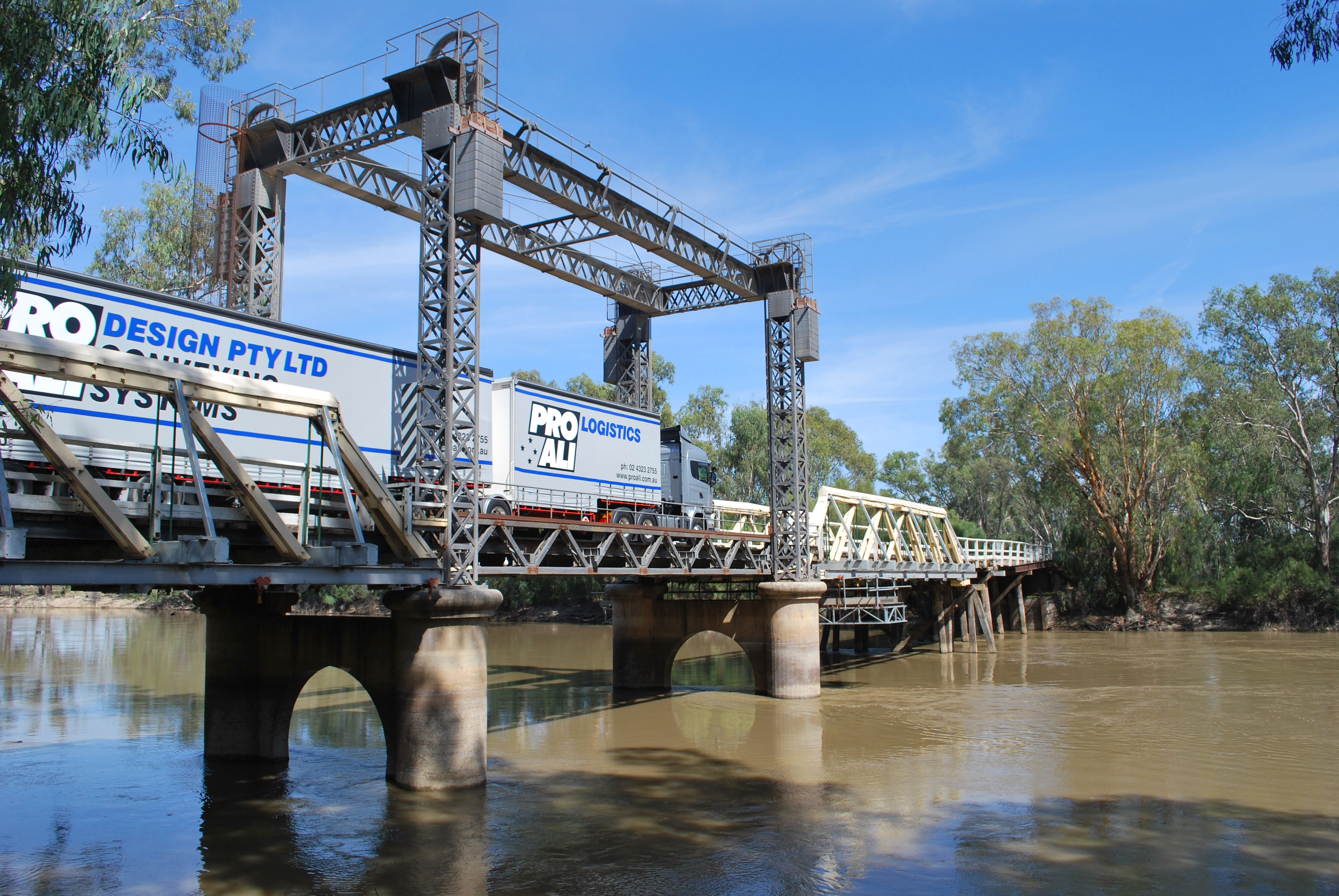
- A road train crosses the bridge in 2012
- Coordinates: 35°01′50″S 143°20′07″E
- Carries: Tooleybuc Road: Motor vehicles only
- Crosses: Murray River
- Locale: Tooleybuc, New South Wales, Australia
- Begins: Tooleybuc, New South Wales
- Ends: Piangil, Victoria
- Other name: Tooleybuc Bridge over Murray River
- Owner: Transport for NSW
- Preceded by: Nyah Bridge
- Followed by: Robinvale-Euston Bridge

Characteristics
- Design: Allan truss with lift-span
- Material: Timber and steel
- Trough construction: Timber
- Pier construction: Concrete and steel
- Longest span: 17.8-metre (58 ft)
- No. of spans: 3
- Clearance above: 8.5 metres (28 ft) flood level
- No. of lanes: One

History
- Engineering design by: Percy Allan
- Constructed by: NSW Department of Public Works
- Construction end: December 1924
- Construction cost: A£28,795
- Inaugurated: 27 February 1925 by Mrs F. E. Old
- Replaces: Vehicular punt (c. 1870s–1925)

New South Wales Heritage Register
- Official name: Tooleybuc Bridge over Murray River
- Type: State heritage (built)
- Designated: 20 June 2000
- Reference no.: 1482
- Type: Road Bridge
- Category: Transport – Land
- Builders: NSW Department of Public Works

Victorian Heritage Register
- Official name: Tooleybuc Bridge
- Type: Registered place
- Designated: 10 July 2008
- Reference no.: VHR H0765
- Type: Road Bridge
- Category: Transport - Road

Location
- Interactive map of Tooleybuc Bridge

The Tooleybuc Bridge is a dual heritage-listed road bridge that carries Tooleybuc Road across the Murray River, located in Tooleybuc, New South Wales, Australia. It was built in 1925. The bridge is owned by the Transport for NSW, and is also called the Tooleybuc Bridge over Murray River. The bridge was added to the New South Wales State Heritage Register on 20 June 2000 and the Victorian Heritage Register on 10 July 2008.

== History ==
Tooleybuc lies on the extreme west fringe of the saltbush plain, a semi-arid or arid area created by sediments from the Murray-Darling flood waters. The saltbush provided useful fodder and the Murray frontage in this area, as in others, was largely taken up by 1847. Tooleybuc was on the Puon Buon run, part of the 1840s pastoral empire of Ben Boyd, the whaling entrepreneur of Twofold Bay. In the 1850s Puon Buon was owned by William Degraves and then Christopher Bagot: in the 1860s the Trust and Agency Co. ran 32,000 sheep there and in the late nineteenth century J. Lawrence held the property and ran 50,000 sheep. The high stocking was encouraged by the almost permanent lakes on Puon Buon.

Development of the township of Tooleybuc was assisted by the sub-division of the huge station just before World War I. The Tooleybuc area subsequently became the scene of intensive agriculture, with fruit-growing the principal cash-crop. The river steamers were fundamental to the wool-trade in the nineteenth century; so was easy communication across the river. A vehicular punt was in operation by the 1870s, with a riverside hotel (the Tooley Buc) on the New South Wales side.

Finally in 1925, in response to pressure from fruit-growers, the present lift-span bridge was erected by the NSW Department of Public Works, just upstream from the old privately owned punt. The bridge was designed by Percy Allan, and was his final lift span bridge.

== Description ==
The Tooleybuc Bridge is a single-lane timber Allan truss and steel lift span bridge across the Murray River at Tooleybuc. The main axis of the bridge is north–south. There are three main spans including one lift span, supported on concrete piers. On the northern approach there are no approach spans, and there are three approach spans at the Victorian end.

The two main truss spans of 21.8 metres (72 ft) are of the Allan Type. These trusses support timber cross girders and steel longitudinal stringers. The latter are unusual and are probably replacements of the original timber stringers. The deck is timber. The 17.8-metre (58 ft) lift span superstructure is of riveted lattice steel, including the main support girders. The lift span has been converted recently to allow hydraulic operation. The lift span deck is timber on steel girders. The piers to the main spans are concrete with oval diaphragms giving a similar appearance to the cast iron piers under older bridges. The piers are protected by sheet pile cofferdams and filling.

The approach spans (two being 9.1 metres (30 ft) long each, and one being 7.3 metres (24 ft) long) are timber girders. There are five girders to each span supported on timber corbels. The piers to the approach spans, and the junction of approach span to main truss, are all timber trestles.

There is no footway, but there is a timber handrail except on the lift span which has a pipe handrail. The deck is 8.5 metres (28 ft) above flood level.

=== Condition ===
As at 23 June 2005, the bridge was in fair condition having had considerable maintenance in previous years.

== Future bridge ==
In May 2016, NSW Roads & Maritime Services in conjunction with VicRoads released final plans for a replacement high-level 250-metre-long (820 ft) bridge across the Murray River, located downriver of the existing bridge. The plans involve a realignment and extension of the Mallee Highway (B12) to commence in Tooleybuc, New South Wales, east of the junction of Lockharts Road, Murray Street, and Lea Street, effectively bypassing the town centre of Tooleybuc. The highway would extend west and then south as it crosses the Murray, before reconnecting with the former Tooleybuc Road, renamed as the Mallee Highway, that connects with the Murray Valley Highway (B400), north of Piangil, Victoria.

In November 2019, Roads & Maritime Services announced that the existing dual heritage-listed Tooleybuc Bridge would be added to the New South Wales conservation list of bridges. The bridge will be conserved to ensure its strength, safety and accessibility for the local community.

== Heritage listing ==
Tooleybuc Bridge over Murray River was listed on the New South Wales State Heritage Register on 20 June 2000 and on the Victorian Heritage Register on 10 July 2008 having satisfied the following criteria.

The place is important in demonstrating the course, or pattern, of cultural or natural history in New South Wales and/or Victoria.

The only two surviving Murray River bridges with Allan truss spans, or Allan-designed lift spans, are Swan Hill and Tooleybuc. Swan Hill was the first of its type to be constructed anywhere, and Tooleybuc the last. The bridge has regional historical significance through this association with Percy Allan. It also has local historical significance in the evolving pattern of river traffic.

The place is important in demonstrating aesthetic characteristics and/or a high degree of creative or technical achievement in New South Wales and/or Victoria.

The Tooleybuc Bridge has aesthetic significance due to its setting and size. Within the town it has landmark qualities. The bridge provides a gateway from Victoria to New South Wales and the town of Tooleybuc, and reciprocal contact between New South Wales and Victoria. The bridge dominates the river valley which provides the focus of recreational activity in the township. The setting is not rare on the Murray River, being similar to Swan Hill. The Tooleybuc Bridge is of technical (scientific) significance for its sophisticated design and construction. The Tooleybuc Bridge was the last of a series of bridges over the Murray River that incorporated central lift spans with innovative truss spans.

The place has a strong or special association with a particular community or cultural group in New South Wales and/or Victoria for social, cultural or spiritual reasons.

The Tooleybuc Bridge has significance to the adjacent towns as the main crossing of a major barrier to communication (the Murray River). The bridge is a focal point to transport, and also provides the only gateway between the states of Victoria and New South Wales. The Tooleybuc Bridge is of historical significance for its role in facilitating interstate trade between New South Wales and Victoria.

== See also ==
- List of crossings of the Murray River
- List of bridges in Australia

Next bridge upstream	Murray River	Next bridge downstream
Nyah Bridge	Tooleybuc Bridge	Robinvale-Euston Bridge
