= Wakool =

- Town
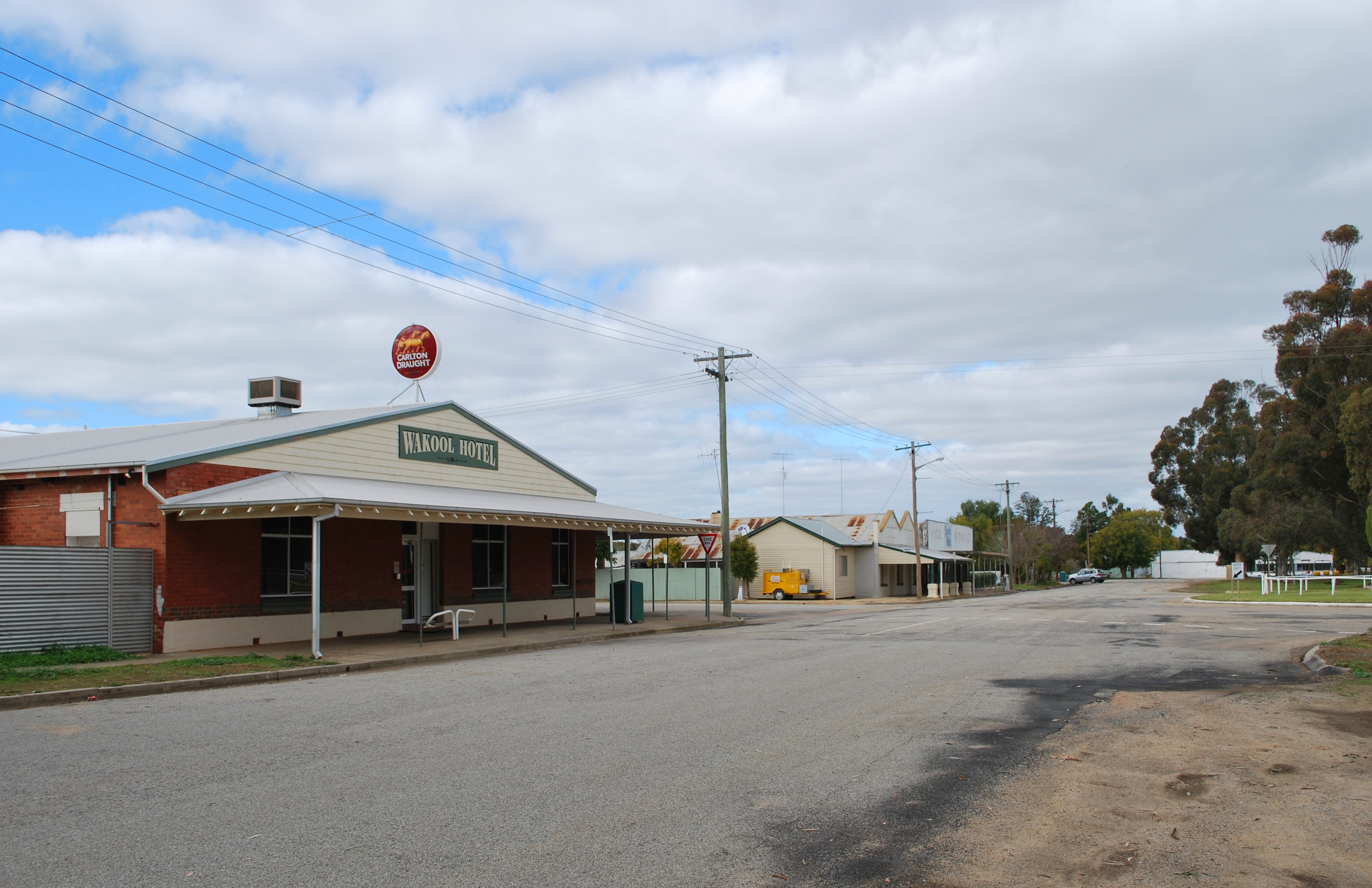
- The main street of Wakool, looking south towards the general store. The Wakool Hotel is in the foreground.

- Coordinates: 35°28′0″S 144°23′0″E
- Country: Australia
- State: New South Wales
- LGA: Murray River Council
- Location: 791 km (492 mi) from Sydney; 336 km (209 mi) from Melbourne; 63 km (39 mi) from Deniliquin

Government
  - State electorate: Murray
  - Federal division: Farrer
- Elevation: 80 m (260 ft)

Population
  - Total: 297 (2016 census)
- Postcode: 2710
- County: Wakool

Wakool /wɔːˈkuːl/ is a town in the western Murray region of New South Wales, Australia. Wakool is in the Murray River Council local government area, 791 kilometres (492 mi) south west of the state capital, Sydney and 336 kilometres (209 mi) north-west of Melbourne. At the 2016 census, Wakool had a population of 297.

== History ==
Wakool Post Office opened on 1 January 1870 and closed in 1874. It reopened in 1926.

Closer settlement of the Wakool area commenced in the 1890s and the town grew around a railway station established on the line between Echuca and Balranald. In 1942, rice growing was established in the area. Other industries include wool and cattle.

== Heritage listings ==
Wakool has a number of heritage-listed sites, including:

- Moulamein Highway: Murray Downs Homestead

== Current facilities ==
The town includes a cafe/post office, hotel and services club. Education is available to primary level at Wakool Burraboi Public School; High School students must travel to Barham or Deniliquin.

== Sport ==
The town used to have an Australian rules football club, which played in the Golden Rivers Football League from 1958-2015, and then in 2017 and 2018. The team managed to win seven premierships, in seasons 1976, 1978, 1980, 1989, 1990, 2006 and 2013.

== Gallery ==
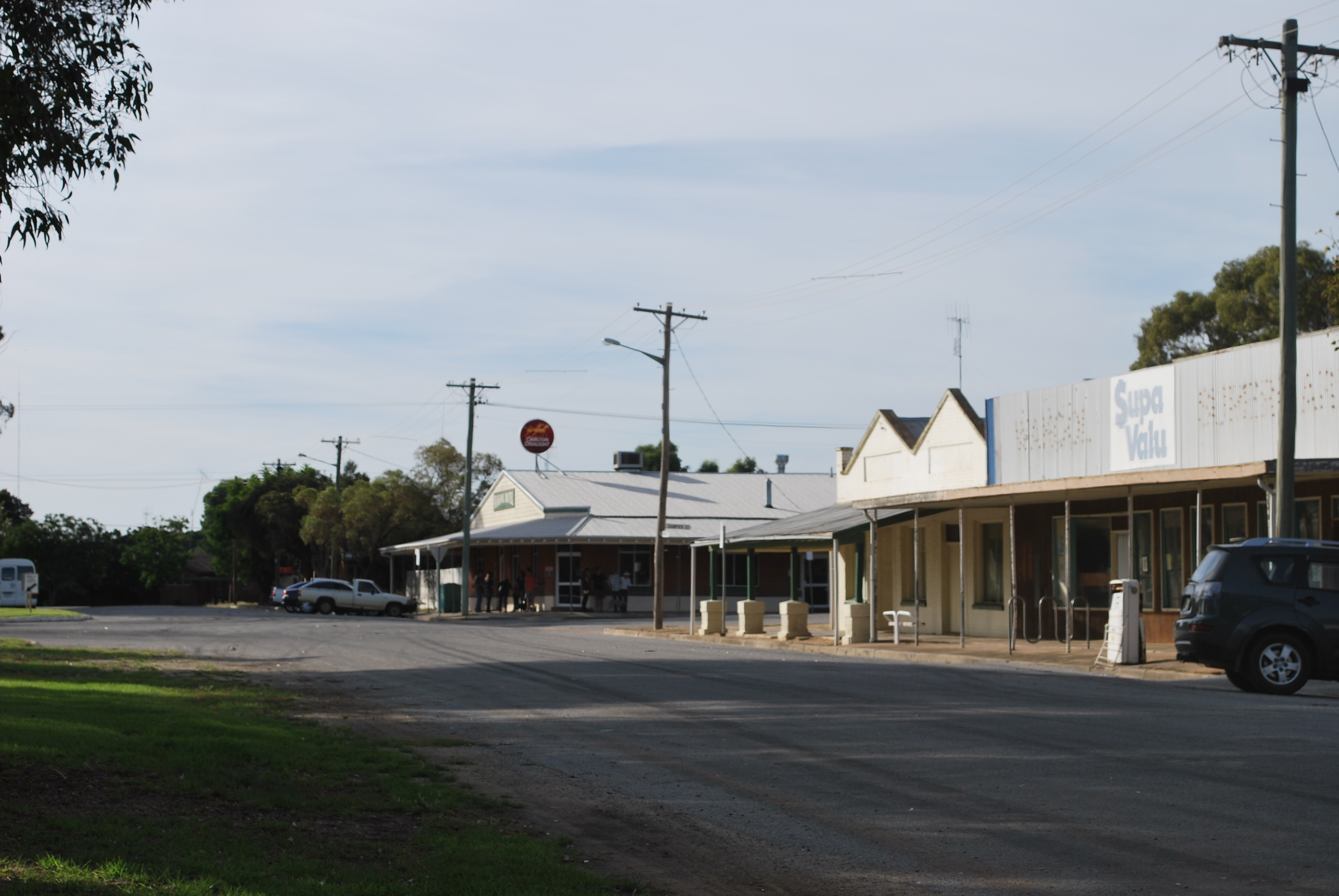
Wakool Main Street.

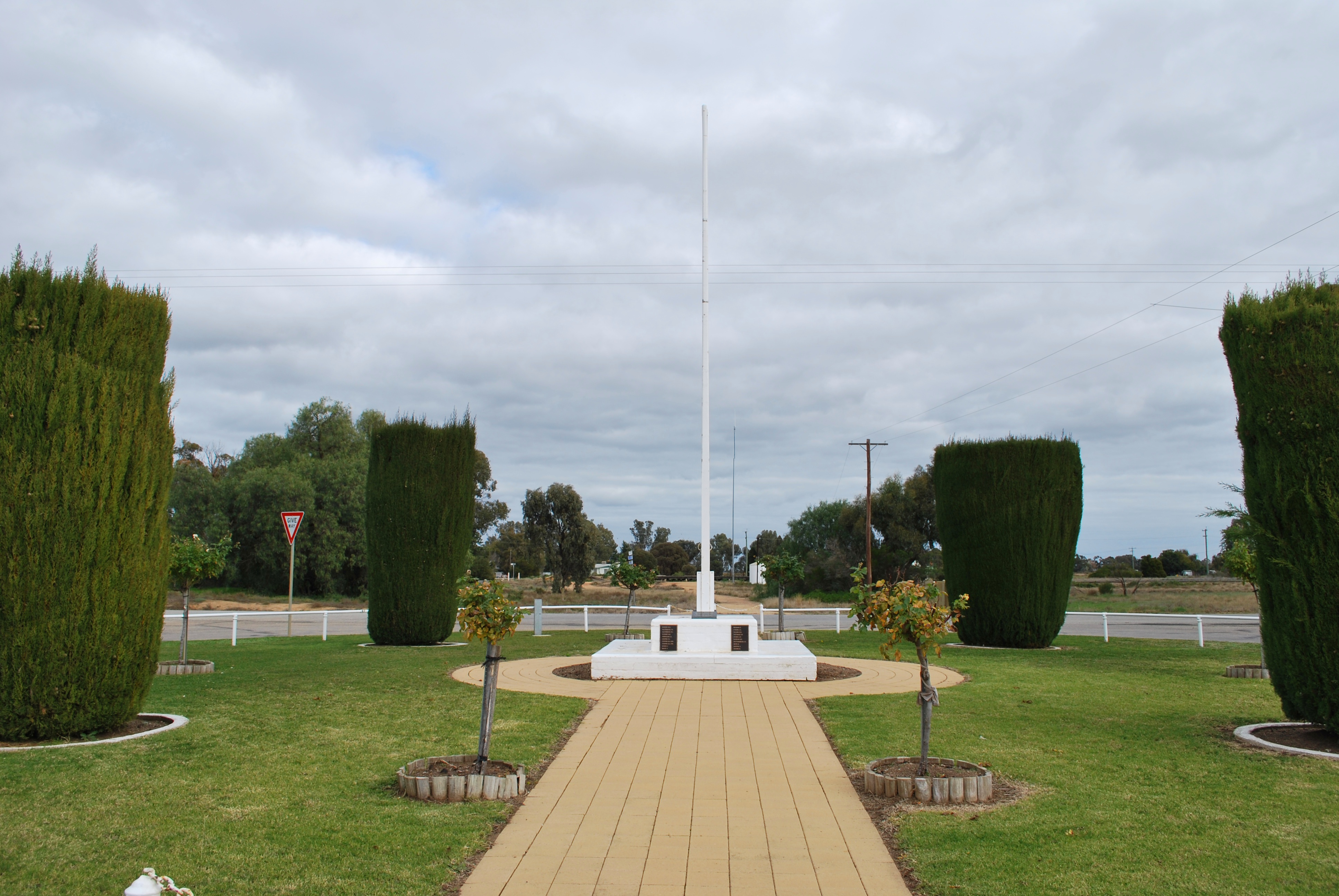
Wakool War Memorial.

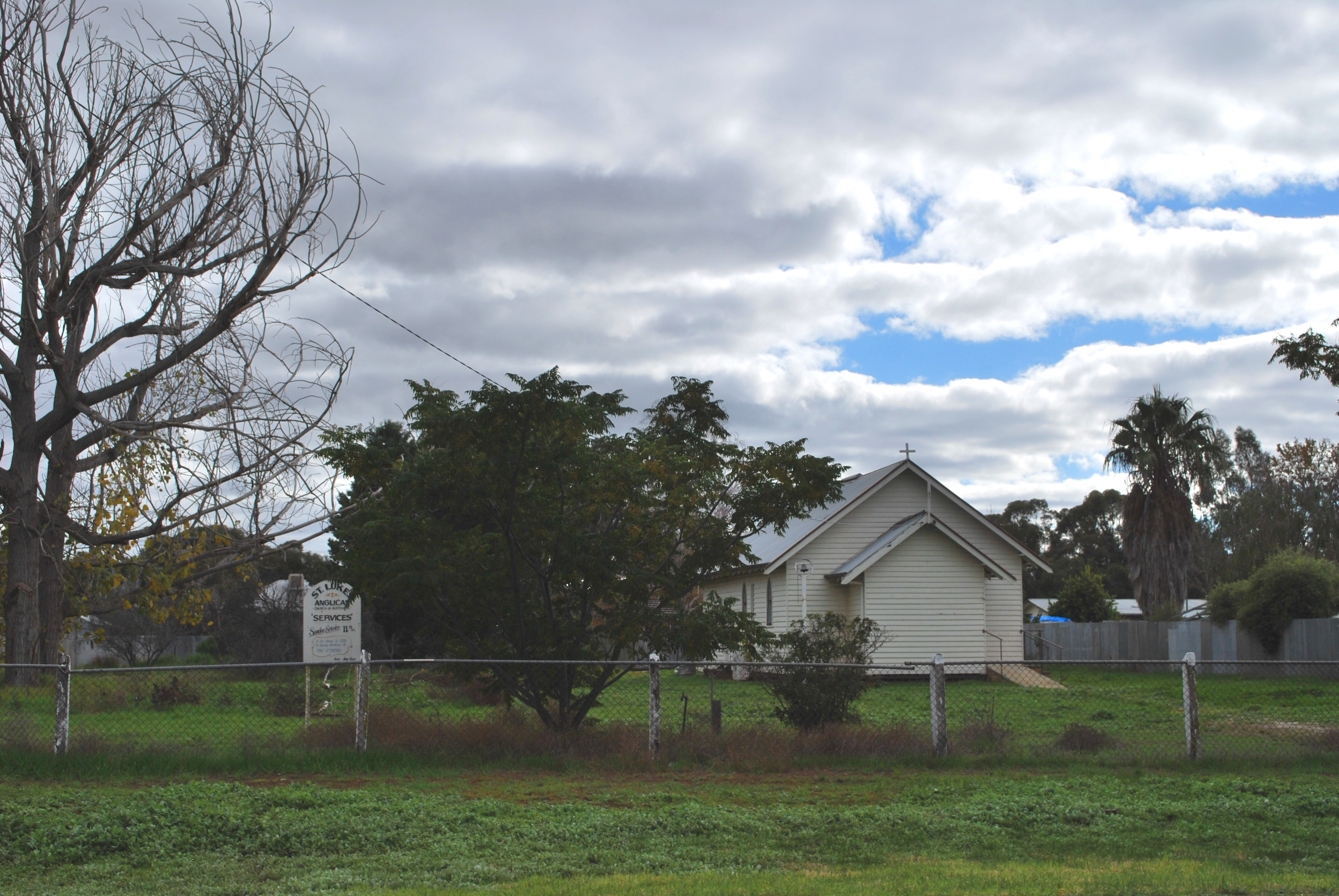
Wakool Anglican Church.

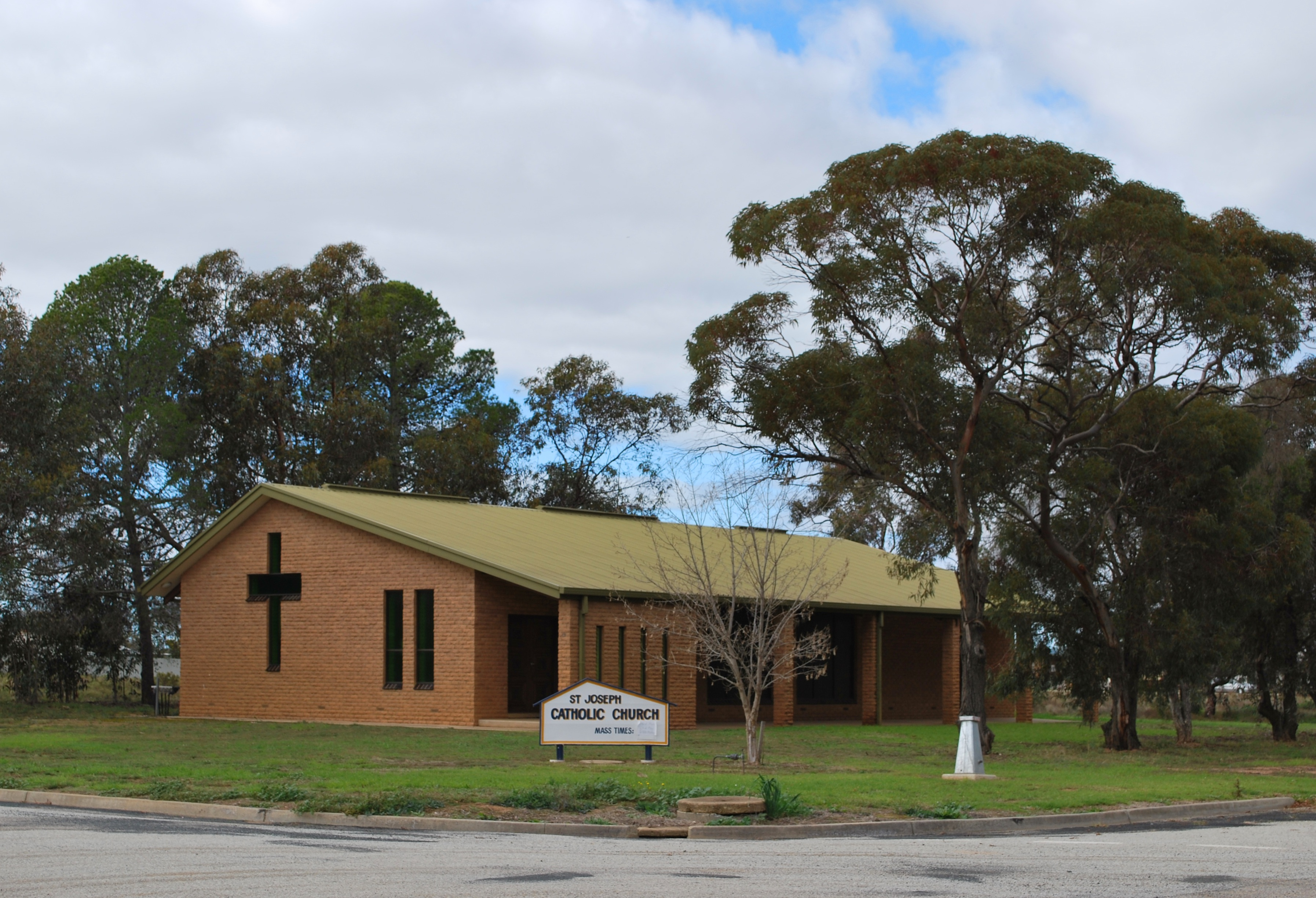
Wakool Roman Catholic Church building.

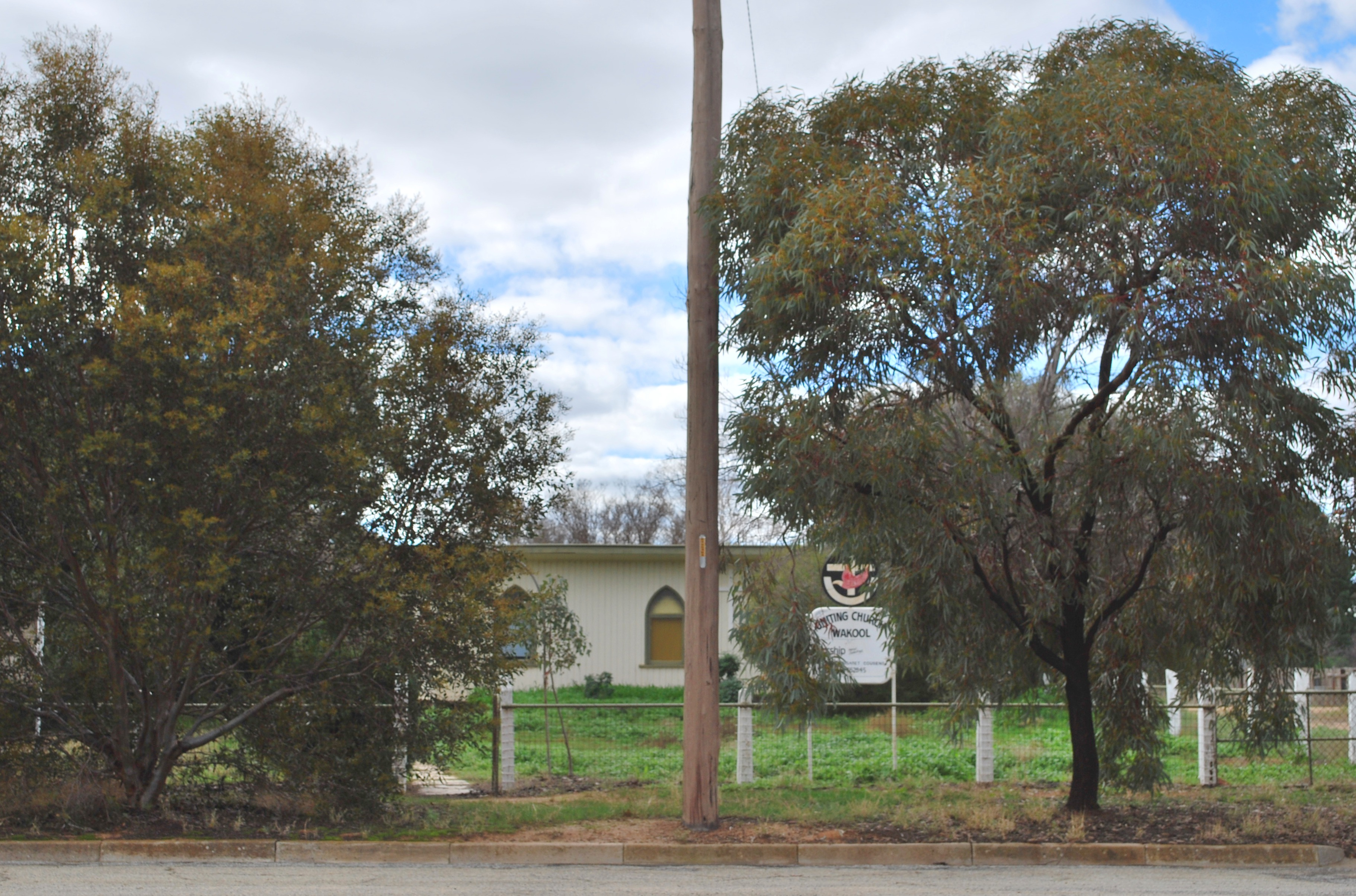
Wakool Uniting Church.

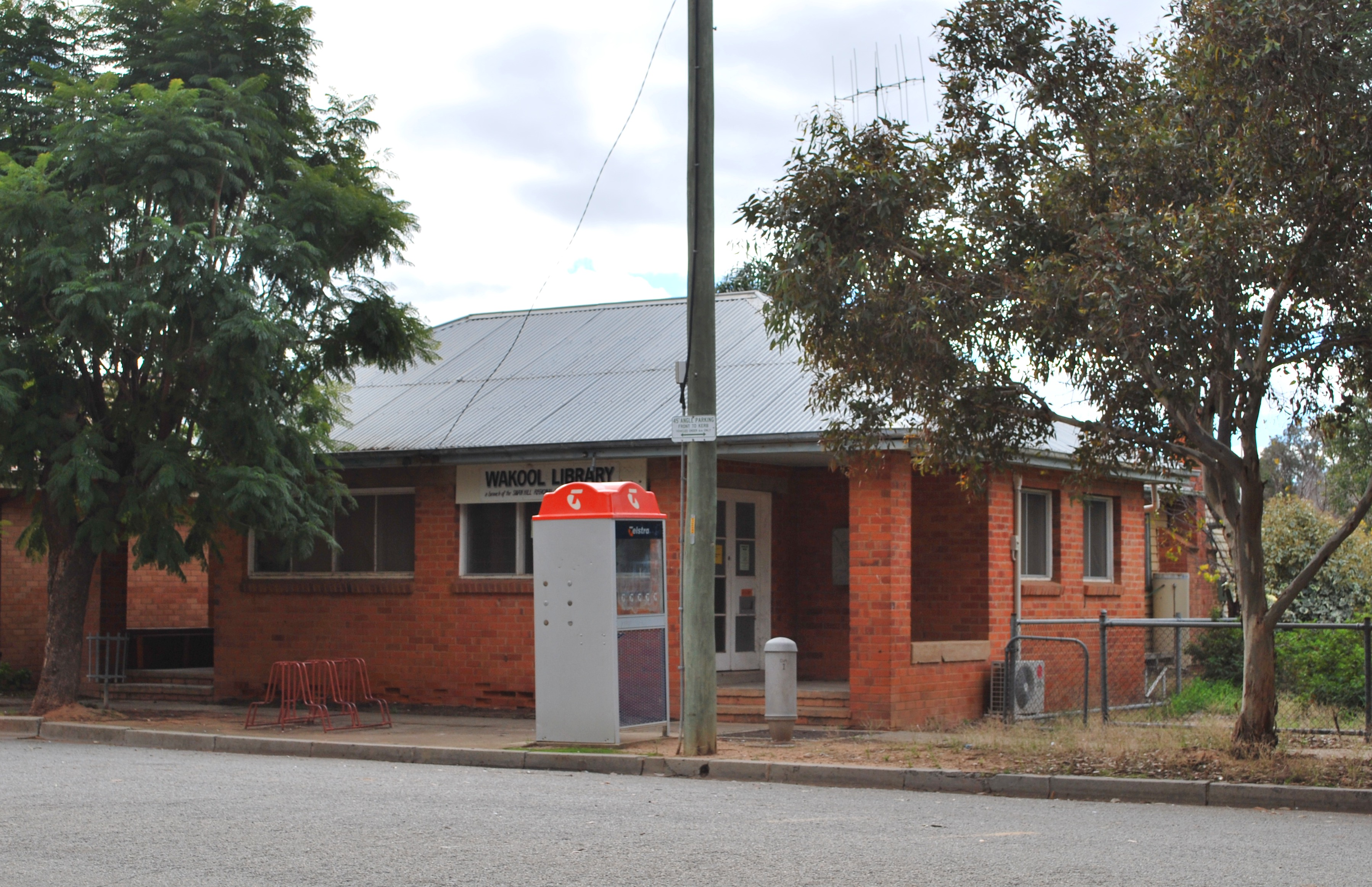
Wakool Library.

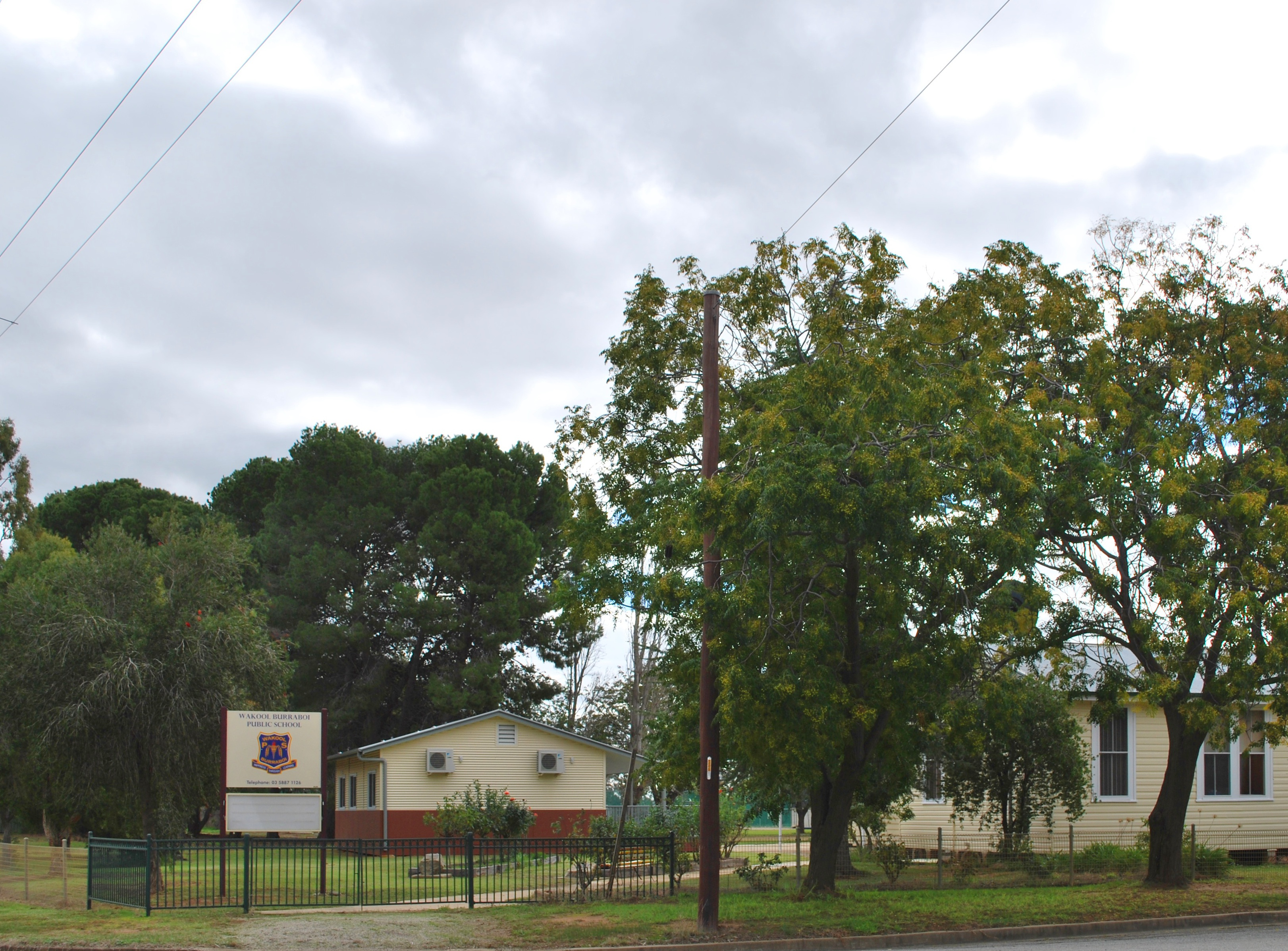
Wakool Public School.

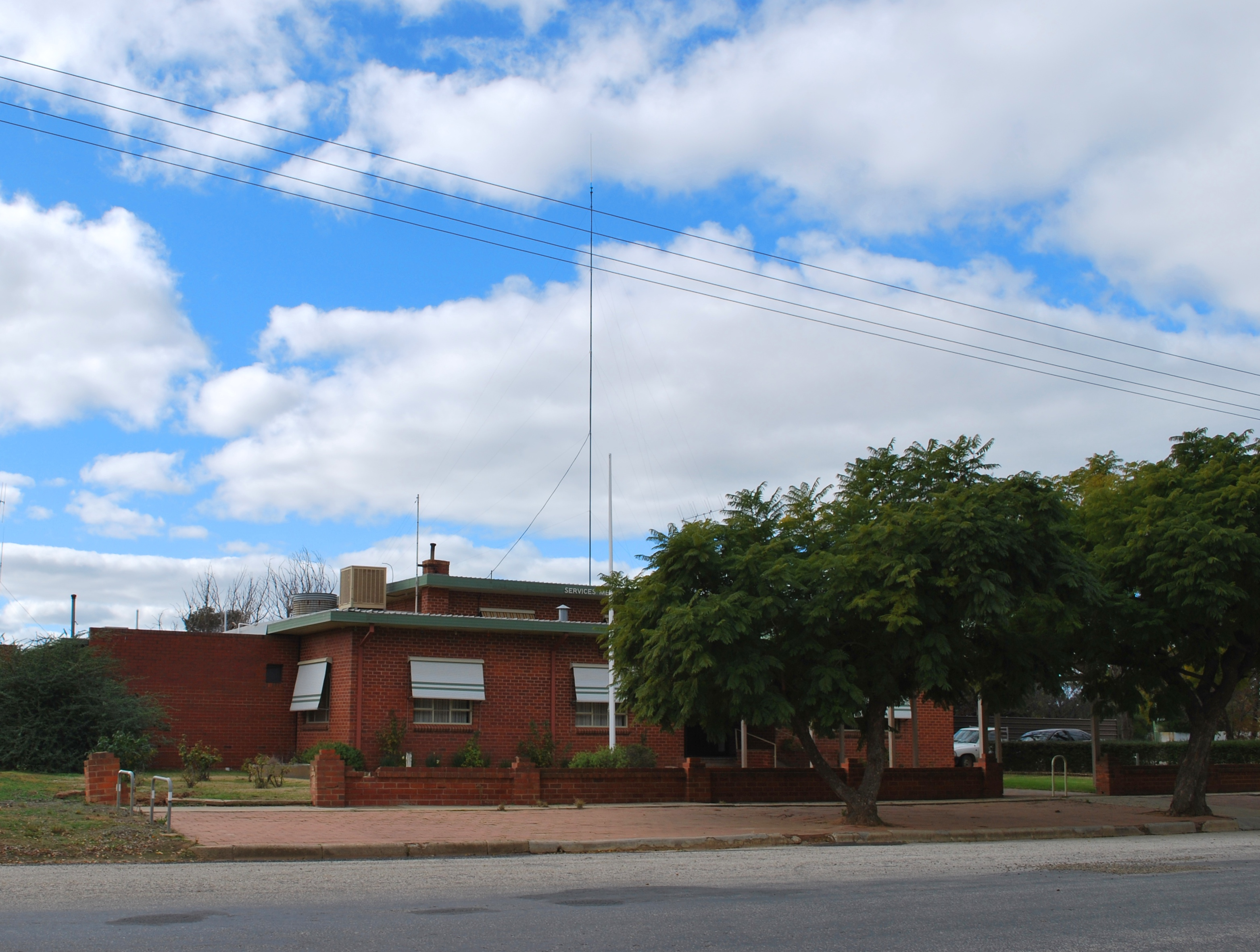
Wakool Services Club.
