= Caldwell, New South Wales =

Caldwell New South Wales
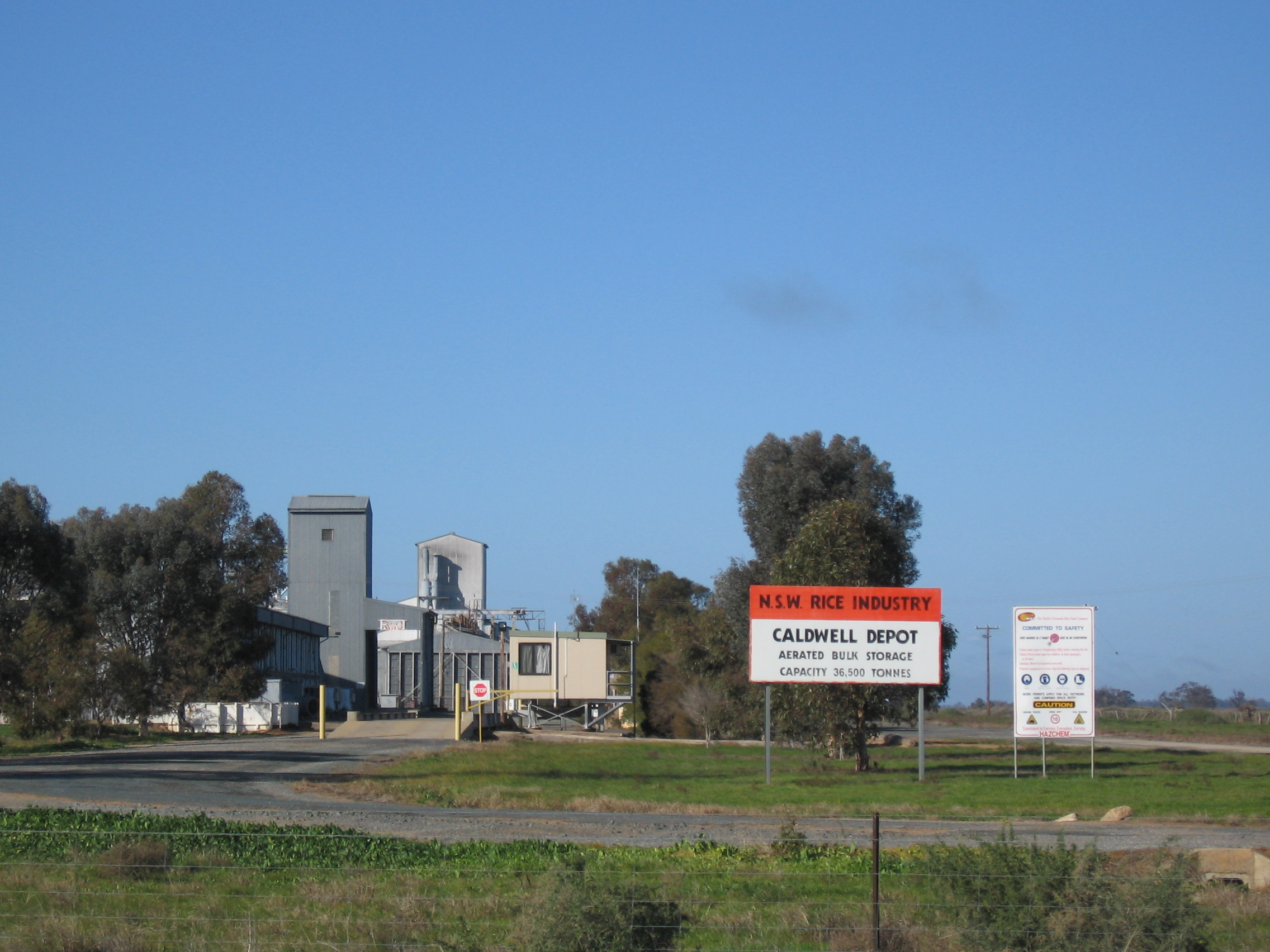
- Rice silo at Caldwell

- Coordinates: 35°38′S 144°30′E
- Population: 42 (SAL 2021)
- Postcode(s): 2710
- Elevation: 90 m (295 ft)
- Location: 773 km (480 mi) from Sydney; 249 km (155 mi) from Albury; 11 km (7 mi) from Yallakool; 10 km (6 mi) from Tantonan
- LGA(s): Murray River Council
- County: Cadell
- State electorate(s): Murray
- Federal division(s): Farrer

Caldwell is an Australian village community in the Deniboota Irrigation Area in the central south part of the Riverina and situated about 45 kilometres (28 mi) west from Deniliquin, New South Wales and 10 kilometres (6.2 mi) north west from Tantonan.

Caldwell Post Office opened on 21 June 1926 and closed in 1970.
