= Wakool River =

River in New South Wales, Australia

Coordinates: 34°51′30″S 143°21′10″E

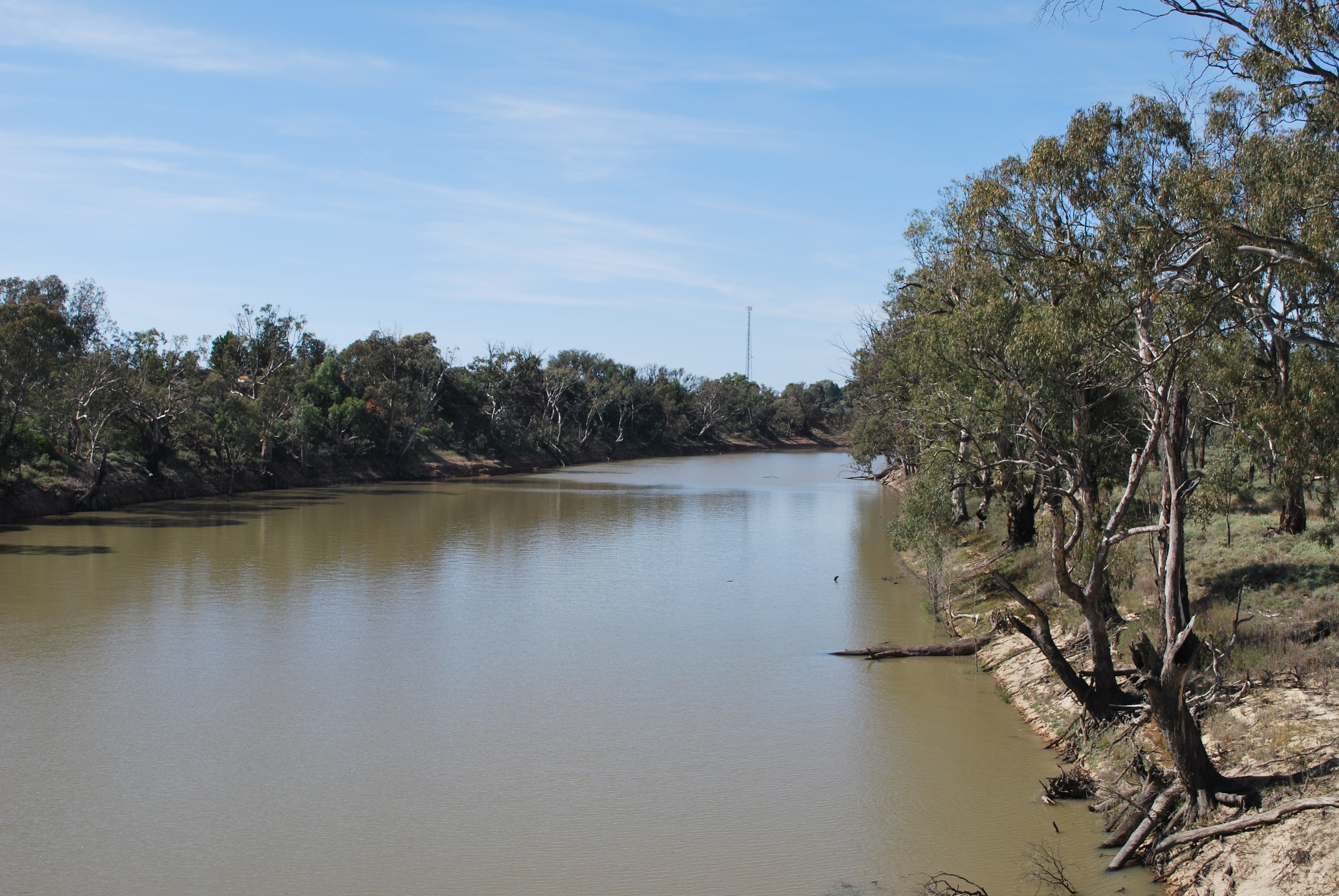
- The Wakool River near Kyalite.
- Etymology: Aboriginal:

Location
- Country: Australia
- State: New South Wales
- Region: IBRA: Riverina
- District: Riverina
- Municipalities: Deniliquin, Murray, Wakool

Physical characteristics
- Source: Edward River
  - location: near Deniliquin
  - elevation: 100 m (330 ft)
- Mouth: confluence with the Edward River
  - location: at Wakool Junction
  - elevation: 58 m (190 ft)
- Length: 363 km (226 mi)

Basin features
- River system: Murray River, Murray–Darling basin
- Tributaries
  - right: Niemur River

Wakool River, an anabranch of the Edward River that is part of the Murray River catchment within the Murray–Darling basin, is located in the western Riverina region of south western New South Wales, Australia.

The Wakool River splits from the Edward River (itself an anabranch of the Murray) near Deniliquin, and flows generally to the west, southwest, northwest, and then west, joined by eleven minor tributaries, including the Niemur River. The Wakool is rejoined by the Edward River near Kyalite, not far from where it runs back into the main channel of the Murray, at Wakool Junction; dropping 43 metres (141 ft) over the course of its 363 kilometres (226 mi) length.

== See also ==
- Rivers of New South Wales
- Gee Gee Bridge over Wakool River
