= Mars, New South Wales =

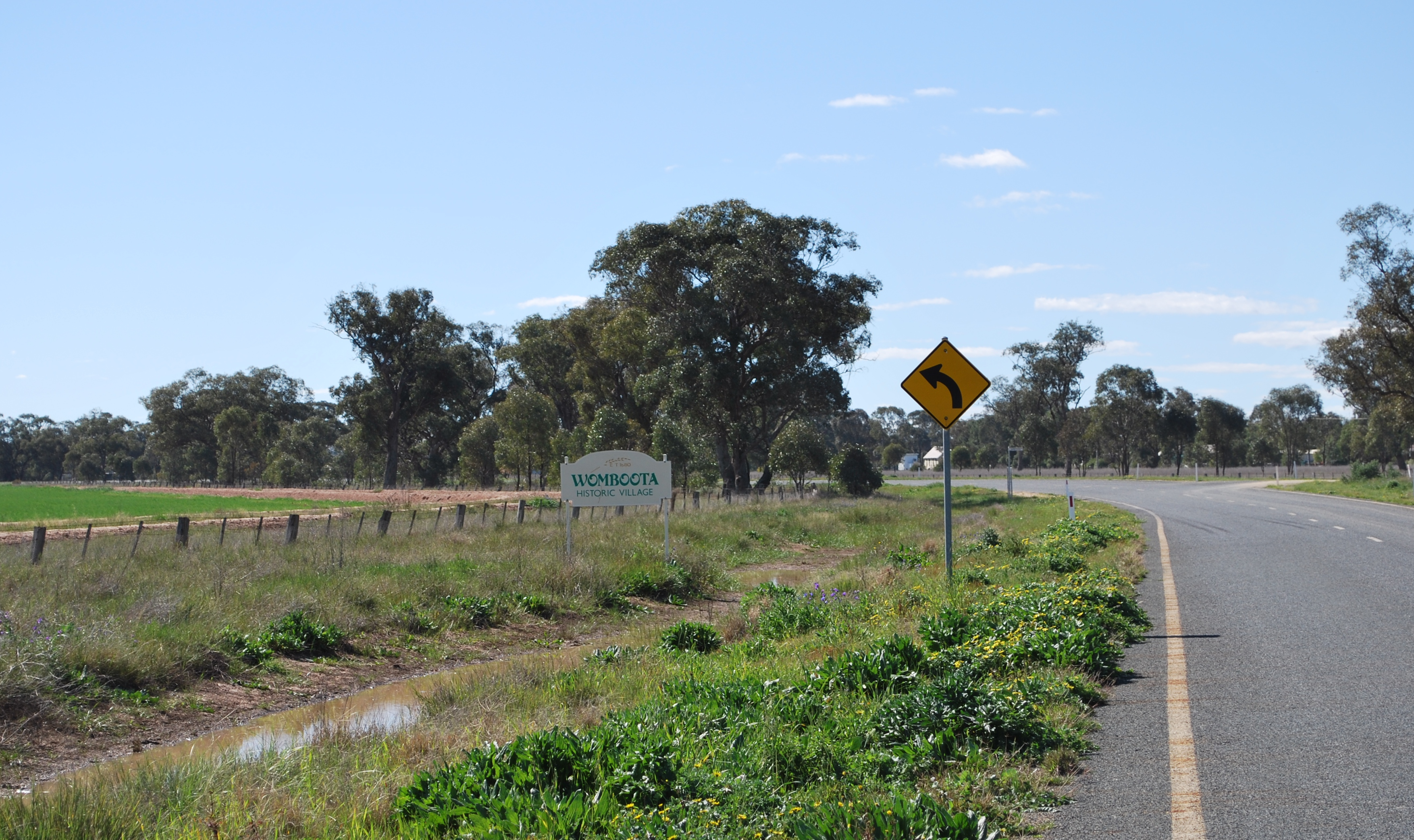
Mars, New South Wales

Mars, New South Wales is a locality in Cadell County, southern New South Wales, Australia. It is 15 km north west of Echuca, Victoria on the Balranald branch line of the Deniliquin railway line.

The Parish is on the Murray River and therefore borders the State of Victoria, It lies at the closest point on that border to Melbourne the Capital of Victoria. The Perricoota State Forest covers much of the west of the parish and the main town is Womboota, New South Wales. The Cadell Fault runs through the parish.

Agriculture remains the main economic activity and electorally the locality is in the Division of Farrer.

== History ==
The area was the traditional home of the Barababaraba and Yorta Yorta peoples, with the Ngureaiillam people across the river.

The first Europeans to the area were Hamilton Hume and William Hovell, in 1824, and Captain Charles Sturt in 1830. In 1852 Francis Cadell, began a steam ship service. The river here is still navigable by paddle steamer.
