= Thyra, New South Wales =

Thyra
- Town
- Coordinates: 35°49′54″S 144°41′04″E
- Country: Australia
- State: New South Wales
- LGA: Murray River Council
- Location: 790 km (490 mi) from Sydney; 262 km (163 mi) from Melbourne; 42 km (26 mi) from Echuca (Vic); 30 km (19 mi) from Deniliquin; 40 km (25 mi) from Barmah (Vic)
- Established: 1860

Government
  - State electorate: Murray
  - Federal division: Farrer
- Elevation: 105 m (344 ft)

Population
  - Total: 650 (2011 census)
- Postcode: 2710
- County: Cadell
- Mean max temp: 31.4 °C (88.5 °F)
- Mean min temp: 9.1 °C (48.4 °F)
- Annual rainfall: 447.3 mm (17.61 in)

Thyra, New South Wales is a parish and suburb in Cadell County, southern New South Wales, Australia. It is located 15 km north of Echuca, Victoria at 35°49′54″S 144°41′04″E and is on the Balranald branch line of the Deniliquin railway line and in Murray River Council.

One church building remains the only public building, and the nearest town is Mathoura.

== History ==
Thyra was on the border of the traditional lands of the Yorta Yorta peoples, and their neighbors the Baraba baraba.

The first Europeans to the area were Hamilton Hume and William Hovell, in 1824, and Captain Charles Sturt in 1830. In In 1852 Francis Cadell, began a steam ship service. The nearby Murray River is still navigable here by paddle steamer.

== Climate ==
Climate data for Mathoura
Month	Jan	Feb	Mar	Apr	May	Jun	Jul	Aug	Sep	Oct	Nov	Dec	Year
Record high °C (°F)	44.7 (112.5)	44.2 (111.6)	40.8 (105.4)	34.9 (94.8)	27.2 (81.0)	26.6 (79.9)	19.4 (66.9)	23.1 (73.6)	33.3 (91.9)	37.8 (100.0)	41.7 (107.1)	41.9 (107.4)	44.7 (112.5)
Mean daily maximum °C (°F)	31.4 (88.5)	30.3 (86.5)	27.5 (81.5)	22.1 (71.8)	16.9 (62.4)	14.1 (57.4)	12.9 (55.2)	15.0 (59.0)	18.1 (64.6)	21.7 (71.1)	25.6 (78.1)	28.6 (83.5)	22.0 (71.6)
Mean daily minimum °C (°F)	15.5 (59.9)	15.2 (59.4)	13.2 (55.8)	9.2 (48.6)	6.1 (43.0)	4.3 (39.7)	3.3 (37.9)	4.2 (39.6)	5.9 (42.6)	8.7 (47.7)	10.7 (51.3)	13.1 (55.6)	9.1 (48.4)
Record low °C (°F)	5.6 (42.1)	5.8 (42.4)	2.8 (37.0)	1.3 (34.3)	−1.1 (30.0)	−3.3 (26.1)	−3.8 (25.2)	−2.6 (27.3)	−1.4 (29.5)	−0.7 (30.7)	0.8 (33.4)	4.4 (39.9)	−3.8 (25.2)
Average precipitation mm (inches)	32.3 (1.27)	23.5 (0.93)	35.8 (1.41)	28.0 (1.10)	40.6 (1.60)	36.8 (1.45)	42.6 (1.68)	43.4 (1.71)	41.8 (1.65)	41.6 (1.64)	34.7 (1.37)	34.6 (1.36)	436.3 (17.18)
Average precipitation days	3.8	3.6	4.3	5.3	8.0	9.0	10.5	10.6	8.9	7.7	6.1	5.2	83.0

Agriculture remains the main economic activity and Electorally the parish is in the Division of Farrer.
