= List of acts of the Parliament of Victoria from 1944 =

This is a list of acts of the Parliament of Victoria, Australia for the year 1944.

== 1944 ==
Short title, or popular name	Citation	Royal assent
Long title
	No. 4999	29 June 1944
An Act to apply out of the Consolidated Revenue the sum of Three million eight hundred and forty-seven thousand four hundred and ninety-two pounds to the service of the year One thousand nine hundred and forty-four and One thousand nine hundred and forty-five.
	No. 5006	31 August 1944
An Act to apply out of the Consolidated Revenue the sum of Three million nine hundred and one thousand seven hundred and twelve pounds to the service of the year One thousand nine hundred and forty-four and One thousand nine hundred and forty-five.
National Security (Emergency Powers) Continuation Act 1944 (repealed)	No. 5009	4 September 1944
An Act to continue the Operation of the National Security (Emergency Powers) Act 1939. (Note: National Security (Emergency Powers) Act 1939 (No. 4645)) (Repealed by National Security (Repeal) Act 1945 (No. 5073))
Outer Circle Railway (Partial Dismantling) Act 1944 (repealed)	No. 5010	13 September 1944
An Act to provide for the Dismantling of a Certain Section of the Outer Circle Railway and for other purposes. (Repealed by Transport Act 1983 (No. 9921))
Cremorne Bridge Act 1944	No. 5015	9 October 1944
An Act relating to the Construction of a Railway Bridge across the River Yarra between the Railway Stations at Richmond and South Yarra, and for other purposes.
	No. 5018	9 October 1944
An Act to apply out of the Consolidated Revenue the sum of Eight hundred and thirty-three thousand one hundred and twelve pounds to the service of the year One thousand nine hundred and forty-three and One thousand nine hundred and forty-four.
Farm Water Supplies Advances Act 1944 (repealed)	No. 5020	16 October 1944
An Act to authorize the making of Advances to Farmers to enable them to obtain Supplies of Water for their Farms, and for other purposes connected therewith. (Repealed by Legislation Reform (Repeals No. 3) Act 2008 (No. 53 of 2008))
	No. 5024	1 November 1944
An Act to apply out of the Consolidated Revenue the sum of Four million and seven thousand five hundred and twelve pounds to the service of the year One thousand nine hundred and forty-four and One thousand nine hundred and forty-five.
Border Railways Act 1944 (repealed)	No. 5026	6 November 1944
An Act to amend Section Nineteen of the Border Railways Act 1922. (Note: Border Railways Act 1922 (13 Geo. V. No. 3194)) (Repealed by Transport Act 1983 (No. 9921))
Administration and Probate Duties Act 1944	No. 5031	13 November 1944
An Act to continue the Operation of Part III. of the Finance Act 1930. (Note: Finance Act 1930 (No. 3889))
Agricultural Colleges Act 1944	No. 5044	11 December 1944
An Act relating to State Agricultural Colleges.
Heatherton Sanitorium Act 1944 (repealed)	No. 5045	11 December 1944
An Act to transfer the Control and Management of the Heatherton Sanatorium to the Department of Health, and for other purposes. (Repealed by Legislation Reform (Repeals No. 1) Act 2008 (No. 10 of 2008))
Constitution Act Amendment Act 1944	No. 5052	11 December 1944
An Act to amend Sections Seventeen Twenty-seven Sixty and One hundred and forty-one of The Constitution Act Amendment Act 1928. (Note: Constitution Act Amendment Act 1928 (19 Geo. V. No. 3660))
Public Library National Gallery and Museums Act 1944 (repealed)	No. 5053	11 December 1944
An Act to make provision with respect to the Public Library the National Gallery and the National Museums of Victoria. (Repealed by State Library National Gallery National Museum and Institute of Applied Science (Amendment) Act 1966 (No. 7379))
Co-operative Housing Societies Act 1944	No. 5055	18 December 1944
An Act to regulate the Formation and provide for the Registration and Management of Co-operative Housing Societies and to authorize the Making by the Treasurer of Victoria of Certain Guarantees and Indemnities relating to such Societies, and for other purposes.
Cemeteries Act 1944	No.	
Coal Mines Regulation (Amendment) Act 1944	No.	
Commonwealth and States Financial Agreement Act 1944	No.	
Country Fire Authority Act 1944	No.	
Country Roads Board Fund Act 1944	No.	
Drought Relief Act 1944	No.	
Electoral (War Service Deaths) Act 1944	No.	
Electoral Districts Act 1944	No.	
Farmers Advances Act 1944	No.	
Farmers Protection (Amendment) Act 1944	No.	
Financial Emergency (Grants and Funds) Act 1944	No.	
Goods (Textile Products) Act 1944	No.	
Health (Infectious Diseases Hospitals) Act 1944	No.	
Hospitals and Charities Act 1944	No.	
Justices Act 1944	No.	
Land Act 1944	No.	
Land Settlement (Acquisition) Amendment Act 1944	No.	
Land Tax Act 1944	No.	
Local Government (Polling Booths) Act 1944	No.	
Local Government (Shire of Blackburn and Mitcham) Act 1944	No.	
Local Government Act 1944	No.	
Maribyrnong and Ashburton Lands Exchange Act 1944	No.	
Marketing of Primary Products Act 1944	No.	
Masseurs Act 1944	No.	
Melbourne and Metropolitan Board of Works (Contributions) Act 1944	No.	
Melbourne and Metropolitan Board of Works Act 1944	No.	
Melbourne Harbor Trust Act 1944	No.	
Mildura Irrigation and Water Trusts (Superannuation) Act 1944	No.	
Mildura Irrigation and Water Trusts Act 1944	No.	
Mines (Minerals) Act 1944	No.	
Police Offences (Unlawful Games) Act 1944	No.	
Public Works Loan and Application Act 1944	No.	
Railway Loan and Application Act 1944	No.	
Railways Act 1944	No.	
Sewerage Districts Act 1944	No.	
Stamps (Increased Duty Continuance) Act 1944	No.	
State Forests Loan and Application Act 1944	No.	
Stock Foods (Amendment) Act 1944	No.	
Surplus Revenue Act 1944	No.	
Town and Country Planning Act 1944	No.	
Trustee Companies Act 1944	No.	
Water (Loddon) Act 1944	No.	
Water Act 1944	No.	
Water Supply Loans Application Act 1944	No.	

== Sources ==
- "1944 Victorian Historical Acts". AustLII.
