= Cadell County =

Cadell New South Wales
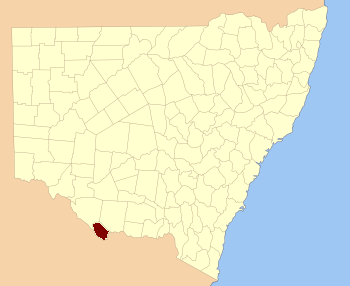
- Location in New South Wales
Lands administrative divisions around Cadell:
Wakool	Townsend	Townsend
Wakool	Cadell	Townsend
Gunbower (Vic)	Rodney (Vic)	Moira (Vic)

Cadell County is one of the 141 cadastral divisions of New South Wales. It contains the city of Moama.

Cadell County was named in honour of Francis Cadell (1822–1879), river navigator and entrepreneur who in 1852, in preparation for the launch of his steamer service, explored the Murray River in a canvas boat, travelling 1,300 miles (2,100 km) downstream from Swan Hill.

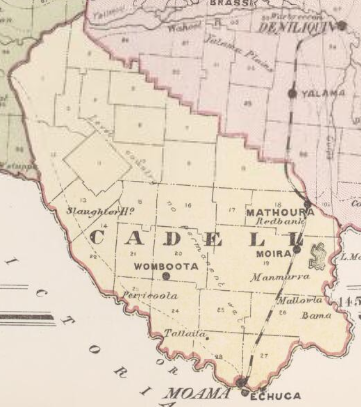
Cadel_cfounty_nsw_1876_map

== Parishes within this county ==
A full list of parishes found within this county; their current LGA and mapping coordinates to the approximate centre of each location is as follows:

Parish	LGA	Coordinates
Bama	Murray River Council	36°00′54″S 144°51′04″E
Benarca	Murray River Council	35°57′54″S 144°38′04″E
Bunnaloo	Murray River Council	35°45′54″S 144°41′04″E
Burrumbury	Murray River Council	35°49′54″S 144°25′04″E
Caldwell	Murray River Council	35°39′54″S 144°28′04″E
Caloola	Murray River Council	36°00′54″S 144°44′04″E
Caloola	Murray River Council	35°59′54″S 144°43′04″E
Gotha	Murray River Council	35°37′54″S 144°35′04″E
Gothog	Murray River Council	35°40′54″S 144°41′04″E
Gulpa	Murray River Council	35°50′54″S 144°51′04″E
Marah	Murray River Council	35°33′54″S 144°29′04″E
Mars	Murray River Council	35°53′54″S 144°39′04″E
Mathoura	Murray River Council	35°45′54″S 144°46′04″E
Moama	Murray River Council	36°03′54″S 144°48′04″E
Moira	Murray River Council	35°55′54″S 144°49′04″E
Nallam	Murray River Council	35°49′54″S 144°46′04″E
Perricoota	Murray River Council	35°57′54″S 144°33′04″E
Porthole	Murray River Council	35°35′54″S 144°21′04″E
Tamar	Murray River Council	35°48′54″S 144°34′04″E
Tantonan	Murray River Council	35°42′54″S 144°23′04″E
Tataila	Murray River Council	36°02′54″S 144°42′04″E
Thule	Murray River Council	35°37′54″S 144°24′04″E
Thyra	Murray River Council	35°49′54″S 144°41′04″E
Tomara	Murray River Council	35°49′54″S 144°28′04″E
Toorangabby	Murray River Council	35°54′54″S 144°28′04″E
Wirringan	Murray River Council	35°40′54″S 144°35′04″E
Womboota	Murray River Council	35°53′54″S 144°33′04″E
Wongal	Murray River Council	35°44′54″S 144°35′04″E
Yarraman	Murray River Council	35°45′54″S 144°30′04″E
