= Arthur Mattingley =

Australian bird photographer and ornithologist (1870–1950)

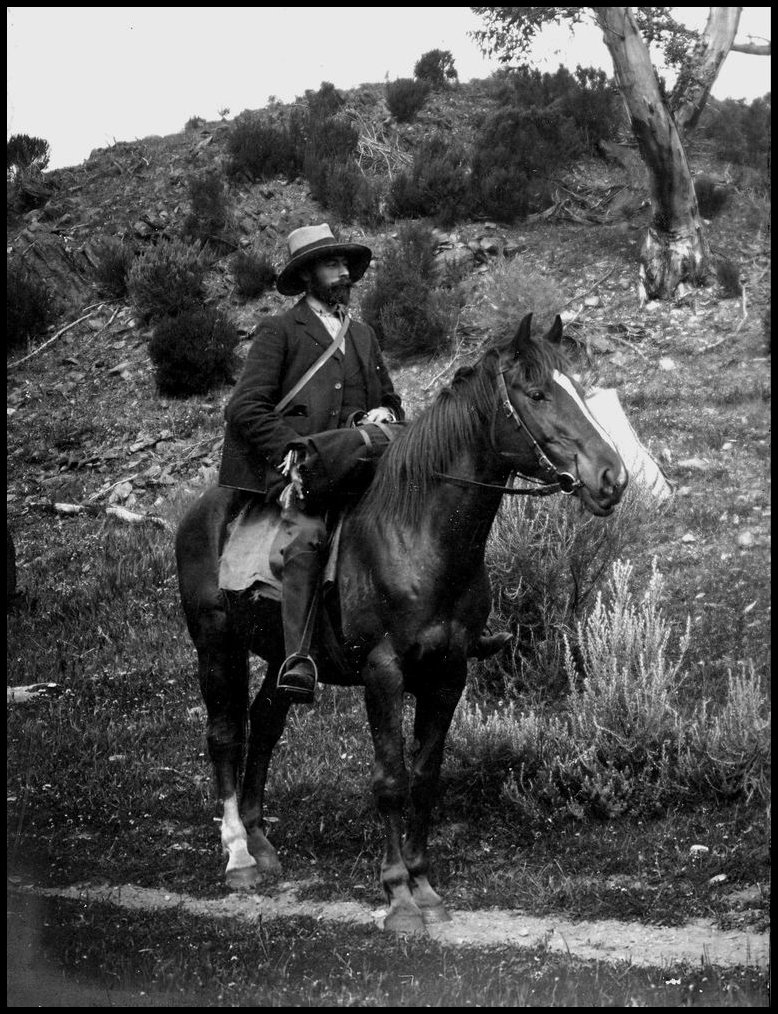
Mattingley in 1905

Arthur Herbert Evelyn Mattingley (1870–1950), noted Australian bird photographer and ornithologist, was a founding member of the Royal Australasian Ornithologists Union (RAOU) in 1901. He worked for 40 years with the Commonwealth Customs Department in Melbourne. He also served as President of the RAOU 1913–1914 as well as organising ornithological expeditions to the Bass Strait islands and to central and northern Australia.

He made his greatest impact as a photographer and conservationist when he reported his two visits to the St Helena swamp in the Emu (October 1907)'

== Plundered for the plumes ==
In 1906 and 1907 Mattingley made two trips to the St Helena swampland on the Edward River to the northeast of Mathoura. He wrote an article about each trip, both of which were published in the same edition of the Emu.

Mattingley's first trip was in November 1906 to 'make a closer acquaintance with the heronries casually observed by me in my earlier years' (Herons, Egrets, Night Herons, Bitterns). He observed 'the stream had risen in many places above its banks and had submerged the surrounding country'. He returned soon after in his Christmas holidays to 'obtain one picture only—namely, that of a "White Crane" or Egret feeding its young.'

On the second trip, as he described in the second article 'Plundered for their plumes' which was accompanied by his photographs, he found the bodies of 50 white and plumed egrets shot by 'plume hunters' to sell to the fashion industry. Mattingley counted 70 nestlings that had died and 200 left to die of starvation.

The disinformation put about by the fashion industry was that the fashion feathers were gleaned from feathers the birds used to line their nests, that the feathers were gathered after being moulted, and that the feathers used in fashion had been made by hand.

Mattingley's 7 photographs revealed the truth, that the much-desired feathers were only produced when breeding, came from the bird's back and could only be collected by killing the parent, which caused the young birds to starve to death.

Mattingley's photos arrived in the UK at an opportune moment. In 1908, a Plumage Bill had passed the House of Lords and was sent to the Commons.

== Royal Society for the Protection of Birds 'The Story of the Egret' campaign ==
To increase support for the Bill and 'to bring home the truth of the matter to those whom words may not have convinced' the Royal Society for the Protection of Birds in Britain turned Mattingley's images into a mini-campaign 'The Story of the Egret'.

The Royal Society prepared five sets of the 7 photographs mounted and printed 42 cm x 55 cm (roughly an A2 sheet). Each set was placed in a specially made case and sent by rail around the UK to be displayed by supportive retailers in 'leading thoroughfares' willing to lend their windows for the display. People could buy a leaflet containing the photos for 1s or 3d. Posters containing the photos and the 'white badge of cruelty' were produced for hanging in museums and schools. (4d post free) or 1sh on card (free delivery).

A set of the photos and 500 leaflets were sent to Paris, more to Amsterdam and to branches of the Audubon Society in the USA. Groups of uniformed sandwich board men paraded around London, bearing enlargements of the photos.

The photographs contributed to the long-running campaign to eliminate the fashion industry's use of bird feathers. The campaign led to the US 1918 Migratory Bird Treaty Act and the UK Importation of Plumage (Prohibition) Act 1921 among other prohibitions.

Today, the threat to these birds is not the fashion industry. A report in 2016–2017 noted that 'Large waterbird nesting events have been recorded within Millewa Forest since early in the 20th century (Mattingley, 1907, 1908). Although these breeding events still occur, they are much smaller in size compared to historical events (Maher, 1993) and occur less frequently (Leslie, 2001). This has been attributed largely to removal of water from within the Murray River system.'
