= Moira, New South Wales =

Moira New South Wales
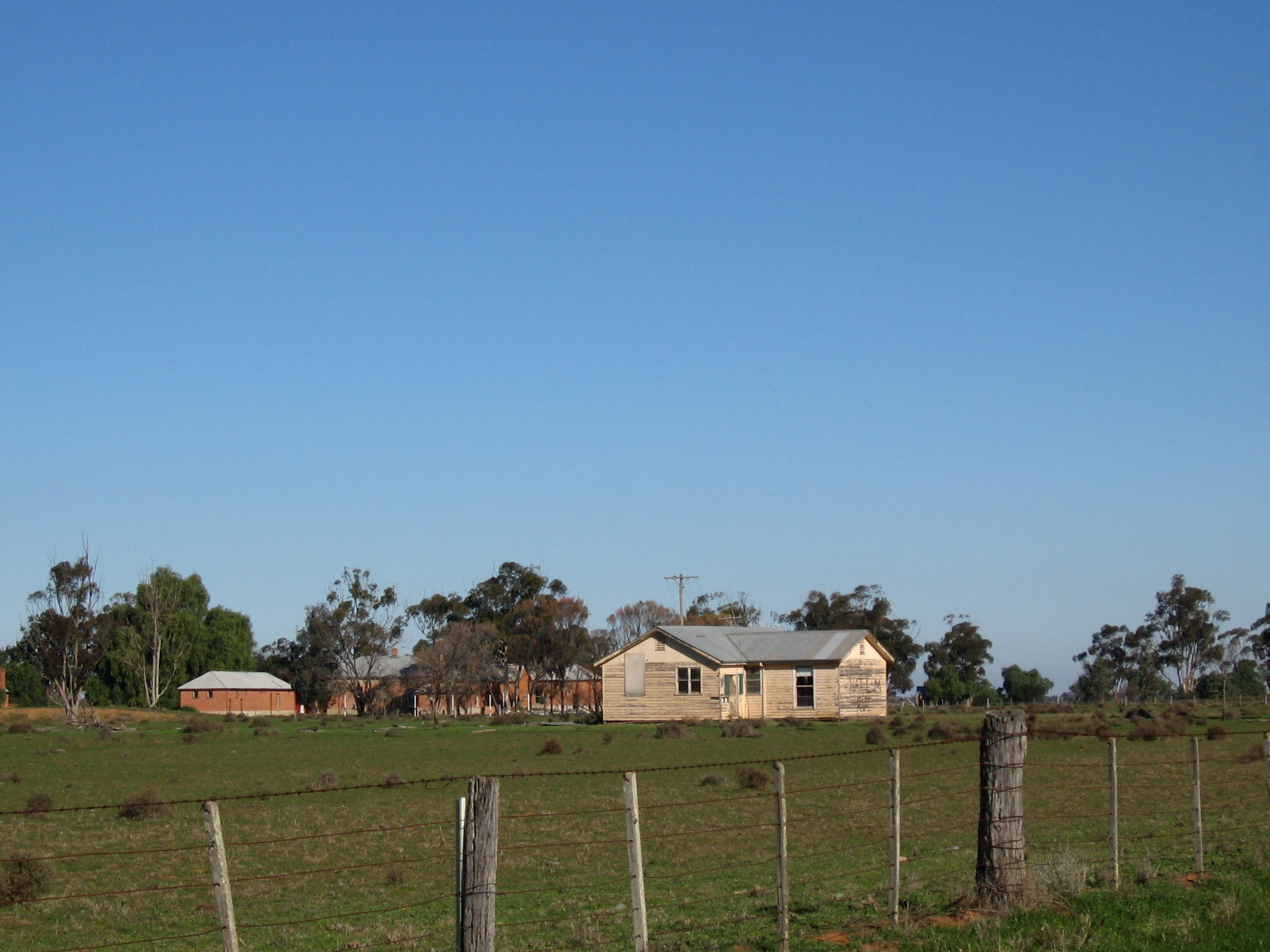
- Moira homestead

- Coordinates: 35°55′37″S 144°50′52″E
- Postcode(s): 2710
- Elevation: 99 m (325 ft)
- Location: 11 km (7 mi) from Barnes; 15 km (9 mi) from Mathoura
- LGA(s): Murray River Council
- County: Cowper
- State electorate(s): Murray
- Federal division(s): Farrer

Moira is a rural community in the central south part of the Riverina and the site of a railway station. It is situated by road, about 11 kilometres north of Barnes and 15 kilometres south west of Mathoura.

Moira Post Office opened on 16 December 1879 and closed in 1970.
