= List of acts of the Parliament of Victoria from 1922 =

This is a list of acts of the Parliament of Victoria, Australia for the year 1922.

== 1922 ==
Short title, or popular name	Citation	Royal assent
Long title
	13 Geo. V. No. 3177	12 July 1922
An Act to apply out of the Consolidated Revenue the sum of Three million one hundred and twenty-seven thousand two hundred and eighty-one pounds to the service of the year One thousand nine hundred and twenty-two and One thousand nine hundred and twenty-three.
	13 Geo. V. No. 3178	21 July 1922
An Act to apply out of the Consolidated Revenue the sum of Four hundred and sixty-seven thousand eight hundred and ninety-five pounds to the service of the year One thousand nine hundred and twenty-one and One thousand nine hundred and twenty-two.
	13 Geo. V. No. 3183	13 September 1922
An Act to apply out of the Consolidated Revenue the sum of Two million two hundred and forty-six thousand one hundred and seventy-four pounds to the service of the year One thousand nine hundred and twenty-two and One thousand nine hundred and twenty-three.
	13 Geo. V. No. 3187	9 October 1922
An Act to apply out of the Consolidated Revenue the sum of Two hundred thousand pounds to the service of the year One thousand nine hundred and twenty-two and One thousand nine hundred and twenty-three.
	13 Geo. V. No. 3192	3 November 1922
AD Act to apply out of the Consolidated Revenue the sum of One million one hundred and seventy thousand nine hundred and forty-nine pounds to the service of the year One thousand nine hundred and twenty-two and One thousand nine hundred and twenty-three.
Border Railways Act 1922	13 Geo. V. No. 3194	21 November 1922
An Act to ratify and provide for carrying out an Agreement between the States of New South Wales and Victoria respecting the Construction Maintenance and Operation of certain Lines of Railway in the State of New South Wales and the State of Victoria the Construction and Maintenance of certain Bridges over the River Murray and other Works and for other purposes.
Special Funds Act 1922 (repealed)	13 Geo. V. No. 3202	28 November 1922
An Act to provide for the Payment into the Consolidated Revenue of the Amount standing to the Credit of the Government Employés Accident Fund. (Repealed by Statute Law Revision Act 1995 (No. 11 of 1995))
Agricultural Education Act 1922	13 Geo. V. No. 3204	28 November 1922
An Act to amend Section Three of the Agricultural Education Act 1919. (Note: Agricultural Education Act 1919 (10 Geo. V. No. 3043))
Architects Registration Act 1922 (repealed)	13 Geo. V. No. 3207	4 December 1922
An Act to provide for the Registration of Architects. (Repealed by Architects Act 1928 (19 Geo. V. No. 3638))
Daylesford Land Act 1922 (repealed)	13 Geo. V. No. 3212	14 December 1922
An Act to provide for the Sale of certain Land in the Parish of Wombat temporarily reserved as a Site for Show Yards and for the Application of the Proceeds of such Sale towards the Purchase of a certain other Site for Show Yards and for other purposes. (Repealed by Statute Law Revision Act 1984 (No. 10087))
Jeparit Land Act 1922	13 Geo. V. No. 3221	14 December 1922
An Act to provide for the Closing of Portion of a certain Street adjoining the Township of Jeparit and for the Grant of a Lease of the Portion so closed to the Country Fire Brigades Board and for other purposes.
Audit Act 1922 (repealed)	13 Geo. V. No. 3228	14 December 1922
An Act to amend the Audit Acts. (Repealed by Audit Act 1928 (19 Geo. V. No. 3640))
Mildura Vineyards Protection Act 1922 (repealed)	13 Geo. V. No. 3229	14 December 1922
An Act to amend the Mildura Vineyards Protection Act 1918. (Note: Mildura Vineyards Protection Act 1918 (9 Geo. V. No. 2959)) (Repealed by Mildura Vineyards Protection Act 1931 (No. 3983))
Alexandra Park Act 1922 (repealed)	13 Geo. V. No. 3230	16 December 1922
An Act to amend Section Four of the Alexandra Park Act 1904. (Note: Alexandra Park Act 1904 (4 Edw. VII. No. 1937)) (Repealed by Statute Law Revision Act 1984 (No. 10087))
	13 Geo. V. No. 3232	16 December 1922
An Act to apply a sum out of the Consolidated Revenue to the service of the year ending on the thirtieth day of June One thousand nine hundred and twenty-three and to appropriate the Supplies granted in this Session of Parliament.
South Melbourne Land (Street Closing) Act 1922 (repealed)	13 Geo. V. No. 3236	21 December 1922
An Act to provide for the Closing of a certain Street in the City of South Melbourne and for other purposes. (Repealed by Statute Law Revision Act 1984 (No. 10087))
Public Accounts Committee Act 1922	13 Geo. V. No. 3246	21 December 1922
An Act relating to the Committee of Public Accounts.
Great Ocean Road (Lands Exchange) Act 1922 or the Great Ocean Road (Land Exchange) Act 1922 (repealed)	13 Geo. V. No. 3250	21 December 1922
An Act to provide for the Excision of certain Crown Lands from a Reserved Forest under the Forests Acts in Exchange for portion of certain Lands under the Great Ocean Road (Lands Sale) Act 1920 (Note: Great Ocean Road (Lands Sale) Act 1920 (11 Geo. V. No. 3094)) and for other purposes. (Repealed by Statute Law Revision Act 1984 (No. 10087))
Melbourne Harbor Trust (Exchange of Lands) Act 1922 (repealed)	13 Geo. V. No. 3258	21 December 1922
An Act to provide for the Exchange of certain pieces of Land vested in the Melbourne Harbor Trust Commissioners for certain other pieces of Land in which the Mount Lyell Mining and Railway Company Limited the Vacuum Oil Company Proprietary Limited and Cuming Smith and Company Proprietary Limited are the respective registered proprietors of an Estate in Fee Simple under the provisions of the Transfer of Land Acts and for other purposes. (Repealed by Statute Law Revision Act 2011 (No. 29 of 2011))
Betting Tax Act 1922	13 Geo. V. No.	
Boorhaman Land Act 1922	13 Geo. V. No.	
Brands Act 1922	13 Geo. V. No.	
Brunswick Lands Sale Act 1922	13 Geo. V. No.	
Brunswick Mechanics' Institute Act 1922	13 Geo. V. No.	
Closer Settlement Act 1922	13 Geo. V. No.	
Coal Mines Regulation Act 1922	13 Geo. V. No.	
Development Roads Act 1922	13 Geo. V. No.	
Drainage Areas Act 1922	13 Geo. V. No.	
Electoral Act 1922	13 Geo. V. No.	
Electricity Supply Loan Act 1922	13 Geo. V. No.	
Elliminyt Land Act 1922	13 Geo. V. No.	
Factories and Shops (Fruit Shops) Act 1922	13 Geo. V. No.	
Factories and Shops Act 1922	13 Geo. V. No.	
Farm Produce Agents Act 1922	13 Geo. V. No.	
Fire Escapes (Melbourne) Act 1922	13 Geo. V. No.	
Friendly Societies Act 1922	13 Geo. V. No.	
Gaming Act 1922	13 Geo. V. No.	
Health Act 1922	13 Geo. V. No.	
Hopetoun to Patchewollock Railway Construction Act 1922	13 Geo. V. No.	
Hospitals and Charities Act 1922	13 Geo. V. No.	
Income Tax Act 1922	13 Geo. V. No.	
Juries Act 1922	13 Geo. V. No.	
Kew Land Act 1922	13 Geo. V. No.	
Korumburra Silkstone and Strezlecki Railway Act 1922	13 Geo. V. No.	
Land Surveyors Act 1922	13 Geo. V. No.	
Land Tax Act 1922	13 Geo. V. No.	
Libel Law Amendment Act 1922	13 Geo. V. No.	
Libraries Act 1922	13 Geo. V. No.	
Licensing Act 1922	13 Geo. V. No.	
Marnoo Land Act 1922	13 Geo. V. No.	
Masseurs Registration Act 1922	13 Geo. V. No.	
Melbourne and Geelong Harbor Trusts (Leasing Powers) Act 1922	13 Geo. V. No.	
Melbourne and Metropolitan Board of Works Act 1922	13 Geo. V. No.	
Melbourne to West Brunswick Tramway Construction Act 1922	13 Geo. V. No.	
Metropolitan Fire Brigades Board Loan Act 1922	13 Geo. V. No.	
Metropolitan Town Planning Commission Act 1922	13 Geo. V. No.	
Milk Supply Act 1922	13 Geo. V. No.	
Municipal Endowment Act 1922	13 Geo. V. No.	
Municipal Rates Recovery Act 1922	13 Geo. V. No.	
Poisons Act 1922	13 Geo. V. No.	
Police Offences Act 1922	13 Geo. V. No.	
Primary Products Advances Act 1922	13 Geo. V. No.	
Public Works (Sinking Funds) Act 1922	13 Geo. V. No.	
Railway Loan Application Act 1922	13 Geo. V. No.	
Railway Loan Application Act 1922 (No. 2)	13 Geo. V. No.	
Railways (Board of Discipline) Act 1922	13 Geo. V. No.	
Rating on Unimproved Values Act 1922	13 Geo. V. No.	
Real Estate Agents Act 1922	13 Geo. V. No.	
Richmond to Prahran Tramway Construction Act 1922	13 Geo. V. No.	
Scaffolding Inspection Act 1922	13 Geo. V. No.	
Sewerage Districts Act 1922	13 Geo. V. No.	
South Melbourne Land Act 1922	13 Geo. V. No.	
Stamps Act 1922	13 Geo. V. No.	
State Electricity Commision (Funds and Accounts) Act 1922	13 Geo. V. No.	
State Electricity Commission Act 1922	13 Geo. V. No.	
State Savings Bank Act 1922	13 Geo. V. No.	
Supreme Court Act 1922	13 Geo. V. No.	
Surplus Revenue Act 1922	13 Geo. V. No.	
Congregational Union Incorporation Act 1922	13 Geo. V. No.	
Constitution Act Amendment Act 1922	13 Geo. V. No.	
North Melbourne Electric Tramways and Lighting Company Act 1922	13 Geo. V. No.	
Tourists' Resorts Act 1922	13 Geo. V. No.	
Treasury Bills and Advances Act 1922	13 Geo. V. No.	
Treasury Bonds Act 1922	13 Geo. V. No.	
Trustees' Investments Act 1922	13 Geo. V. No.	
Trusts Act 1922	13 Geo. V. No.	
University (Veterinary School) Act 1922	13 Geo. V. No.	
Vermin and Noxious Weeds Act 1922	13 Geo. V. No.	
Victorian Government Loan Act 1922	13 Geo. V. No.	
Victorian Loan (Public Works) Act 1922	13 Geo. V. No.	
Victorian Loan Act 1922	13 Geo. V. No.	
Water Supply Loans Application Act 1922	13 Geo. V. No.	
Workers' Compensation Act 1922	13 Geo. V. No.	

== Sources ==
- "1922 Victorian Historical Acts". AustLII.
