= Gulpa, New South Wales =

Gulpa New South Wales
- Coordinates: 35°46′S 144°54′E
- Postcode(s): 2710
- Elevation: 97 m (318 ft)
- Location: 20 km (12 mi) from Deniliquin; 14 km (9 mi) from Mathoura
- LGA(s): Murray River Council
- County: Cadell
- State electorate(s): Murray
- Federal division(s): Farrer

Gulpa, sometimes spelt "Gulpha", is a village community in the central south part of the Riverina in New South Wales, Australia.

== Geography ==
Gulpa is situated about 20 kilometres (12 mi) south of Deniliquin and 14 kilometres (8.7 mi) north of Mathoura.

== History ==
In the early 1900s there were several houses and stock loading facilities at the rail siding as well as Wheat Stacks where bags of wheat were stored before loading onto the train. Gulpa Post Office opened on 18 December 1925 and closed in 1971.

During the 1960s there were two houses at Gulpa one being the postmaster/ railway siding and manual telephone exchange combined. The other was occupied by a railway worker. With the coming of the automatic telephone exchange in the early 1970s the houses were moved. Today there are few remnants of Gulpa, there remain a couple of fig trees that locals visit to collect fruit from, and not much else. There are crossroads on the Waliston Road and Leetham (Line) Road and a railway crossing to mark the place.

Approximately 1 mile (1.6 km) east of Gulpa on the Cobb Highway there was the Gulpa Sawmill. It burnt down in 1955 and was rebuilt in Deniliquin after the fire. There were a number of houses at the sawmill site during the 1950s.
