= Womboota =

Womboota New South Wales
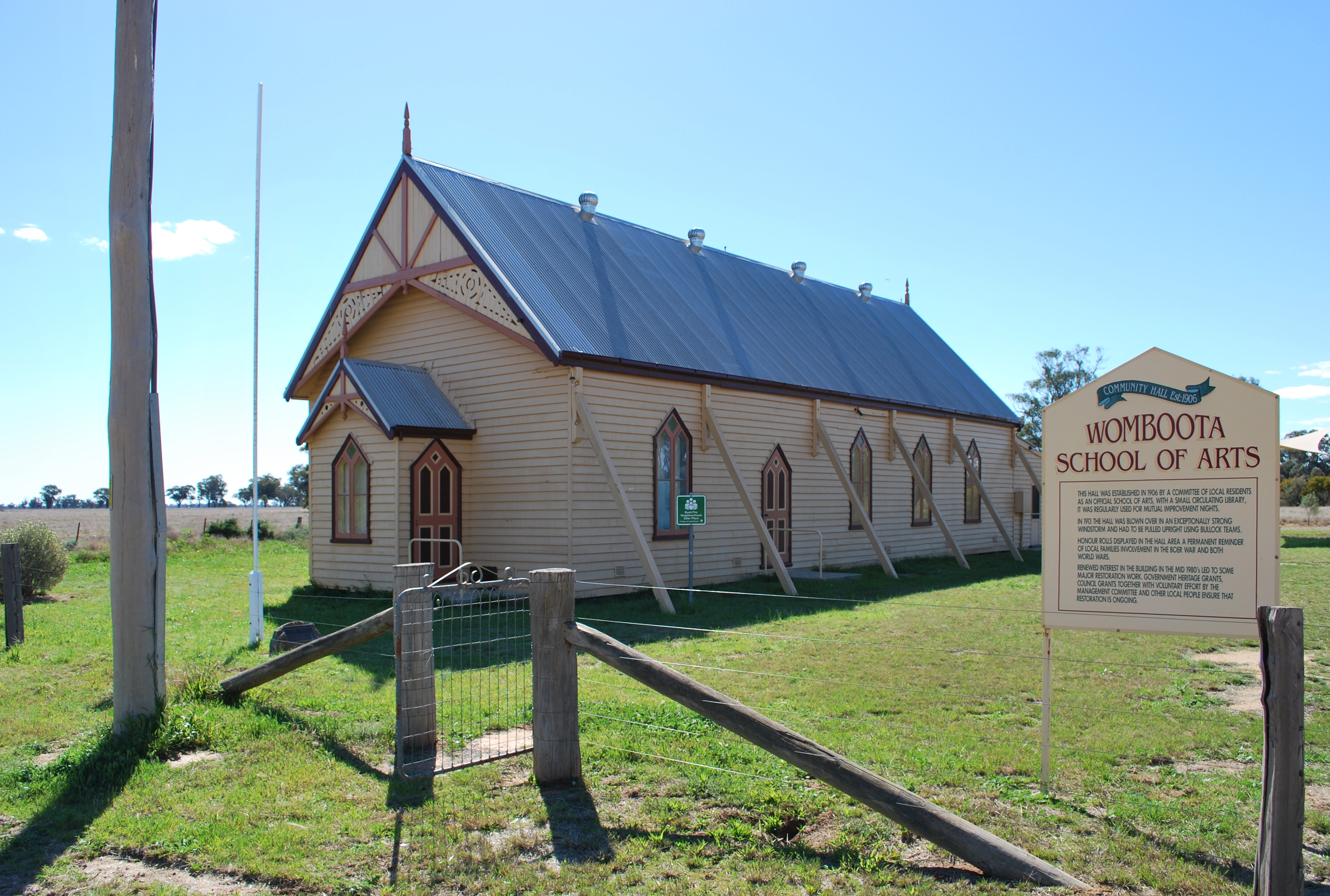
- School of Arts hall

- Coordinates: 35°57′25″S 144°35′19″E
- Population: 105 (2016 census)
- Postcode(s): 2731
- Elevation: 91 m (299 ft)
- Location: 26 km (16 mi) from Moama; 28 km (17 mi) from Bunnaloo
- LGA(s): Murray River Council
- County: Cadell
- State electorate(s): Murray
- Federal division(s): Farrer

Womboota is a locality in the central-southern part of the Riverina. It is about 26 kilometres (16 mi) north from Moama by road, and 28 kilometres (17 mi) south-west from Bunnaloo. At the 2016 census, Womboota had a population of 105.

Womboota is in the Deniliquin land district and the Murray River Council, and was on the now-closed Balranald branch of the Deniliquin railway line.

Womboota Post Office opened on 1 July 1899 and closed in 1979.

The town's name was earlier spelled "Wamboota", but "Womboota" was gaining currency in the 1920s. In 1927, when the Post Office was destroyed by fire and postmaster Kelly tried for arson, the earlier spelling was still being used by one newspaper.

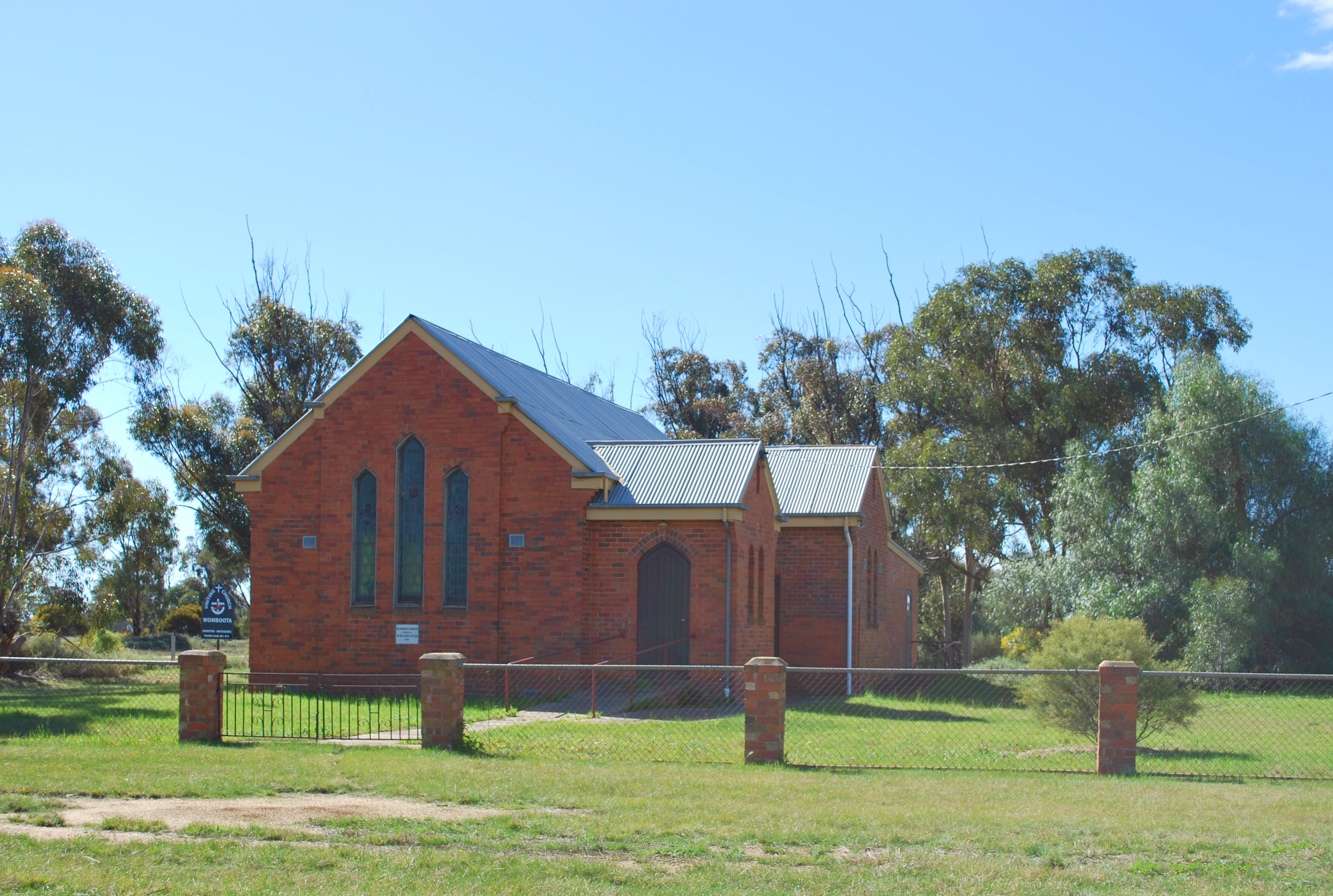
Womboota Uniting Church building

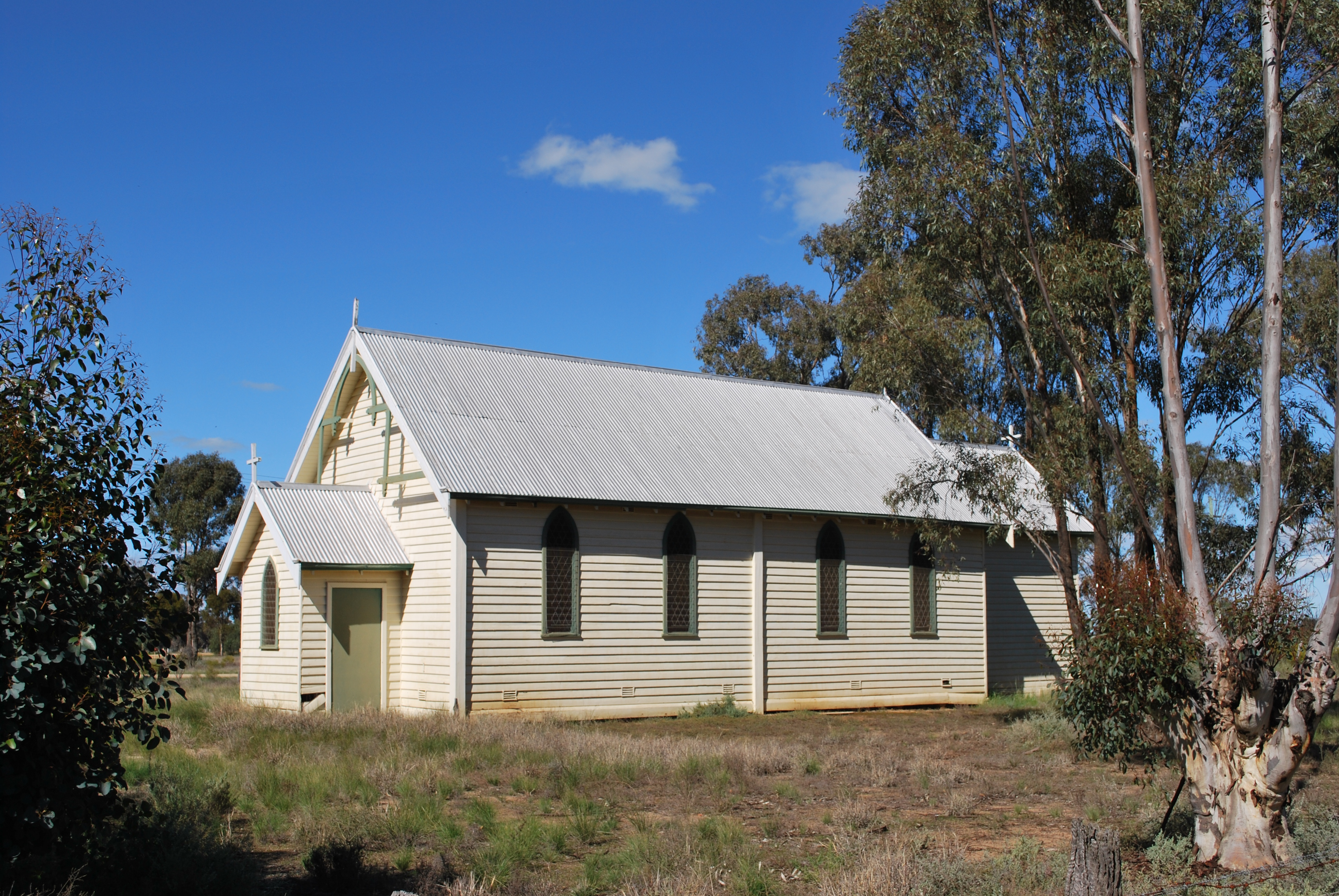
Womboota Roman Catholic Church building
