= Cadell Fault =

Geological fault in Australia

Coordinates: 35°49′0″S 144°54′0″E

The Cadell Fault is a north-south trending intra-plate geological fault in the Riverina area of New South Wales and Victoria, in Australia. It straddles the Murray River and, in quite recent geological times, has affected its course, as well as the courses of the Edward River, Wakool River, Goulburn River and Campaspe River. The Cadell Fault is notable due to that impact and has been described as one of the most significant examples of seismic activity changing the course of rivers. The fault is visible as a continuous earthen ridge along the Cobb Highway between Deniliquin and Echuca, and extends further south into Victoria. The fault is likely named after Francis Cadell, an early European pioneer of the Murray River and river trader.

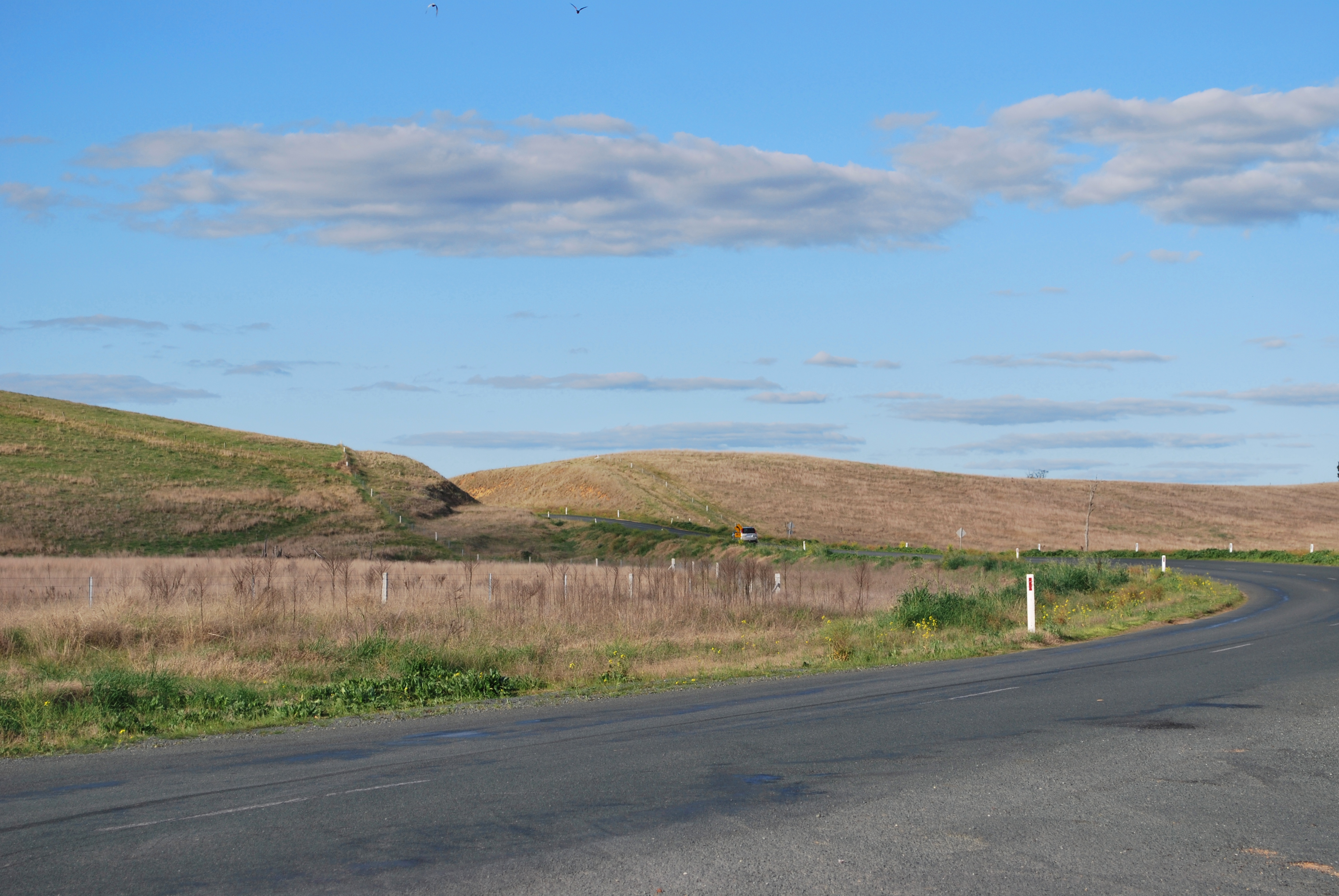
The Cadell Fault in southern New South Wales

== Geology ==
The Australian Continental Plate is generally considered to be one tectonic plate, and is classified as a craton - a stable continental region. Within the plate, however, there are a number of fault lines. Those lines are relatively stable compared to the external plate boundaries, but do have the potential to generate significant earthquakes. The Cadell fault is an example of that.

The uplifted Cadell fault forms a bifurcated scarp, the northern part of which extends for 55 kilometres from Deniliquin to Echuca, with a height of 12–15 metres, and the southern part which extends for 13 kilometres south of Echuca, with a height of about 3–4 metres. The split between the two elements has been formed by the erosion caused by historic Lake Kanyapella (refer to the Goulburn section below). The fault deforms a 200- to 250-metre-thick section of sedimentary rock, which overlies granitic base rock. To the west, the Cadell Tilt Block was formed subsequent to the uplift

== Rise and impact on river courses ==
The Cadell fault showing the possible former courses of the Murray (yellow), Goulburn (purple) and Campaspe (brown) rivers. The fault itself is the red dashed line

The lifting of the Cadell fault has had a significant impact on the courses of four major rivers of the Murray river system, and can be described as creating an inland delta on the Murray River in the area between Barmah and Kyalite.

=== Murray ===
The uplift of the Cadell fault significantly affected the course of the Murray River. Prior to the uplift, the Murray travelled from its current course to the south of Mathoura, through a palaeochannel now known as Green Gully. It then traversed the plains west of Mathoura to join the current course of the Murray further west.

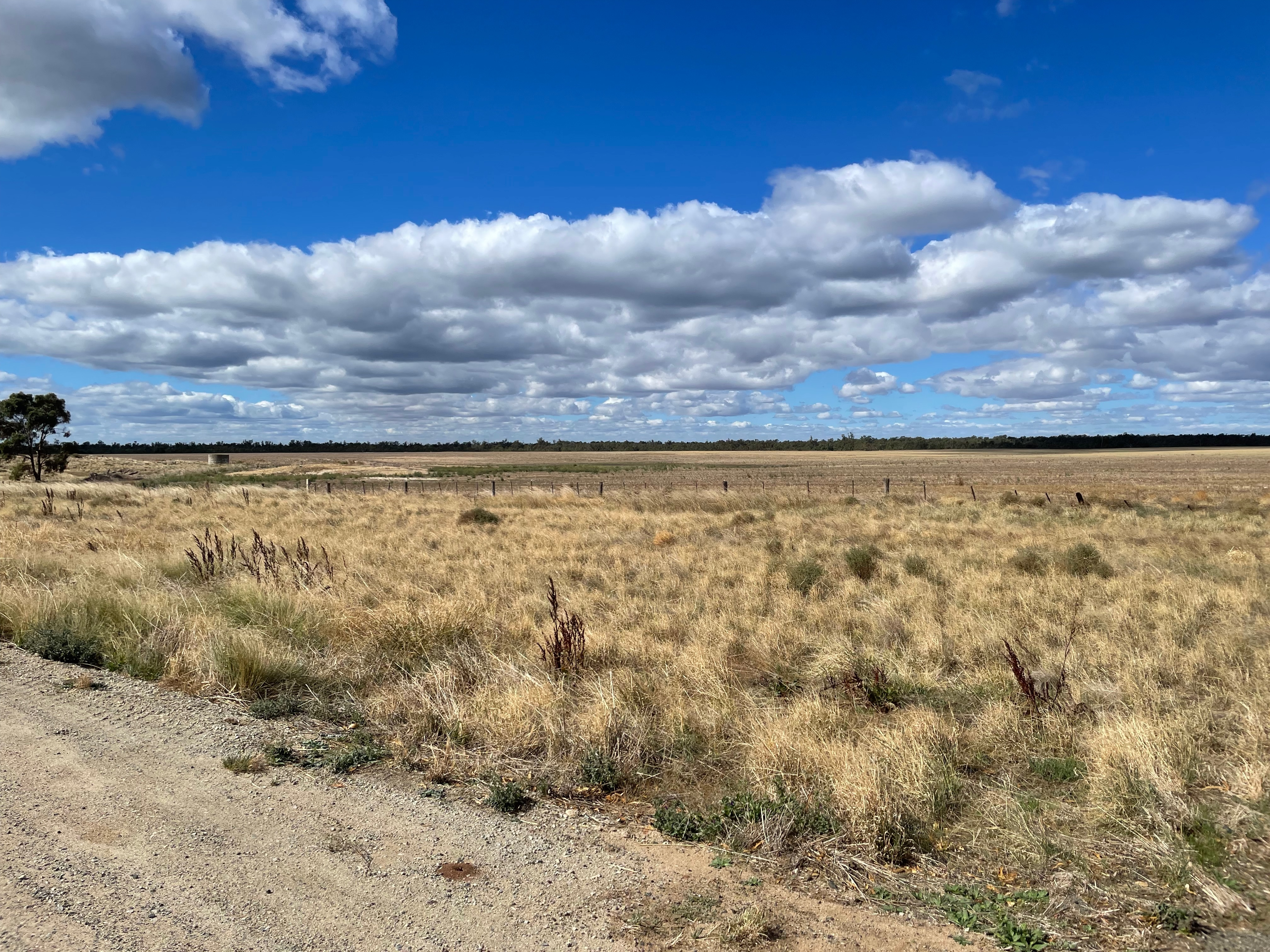
Looking east from the Cobb Highway over the eastern edge of the Cadell fault towards Moira Lake and the Barmah Forest

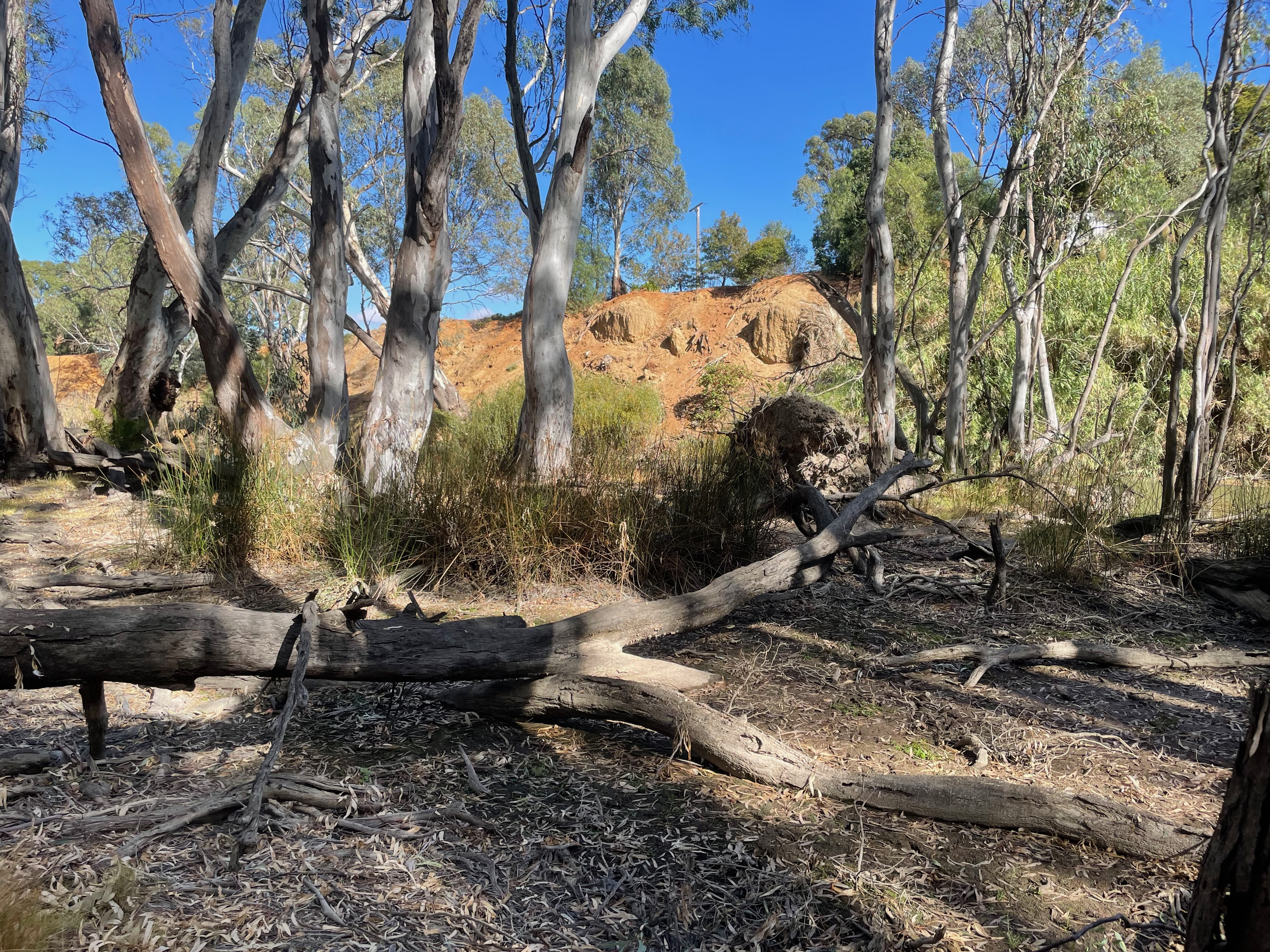
Looking west across the Gulpa Creek south of Pollys (Poleys) Bridge at the scarp of the Tilt.

It appears that Green Gully ceased to be the course of the Murray approximately 45,000 years ago due to the uplift, although it seems to have commenced up to 20,000 years before that (i.e. 65,000 years ago). However, 45,000 years ago it reached a sufficient level to disrupt the flow of the river. Prior to that, the river had been able to maintain its course within the Green Gully, albeit with significant modification to the channel. The uplift effectively dammed the river and formed a large expanse of water, continuously fed by glacial and snow melt in the Snowy Mountains. After a time, the flow found its present course into the Edward River and began to make its way westward via the Deniliquin region. An earlier stream formed by that northward flow is the Gulpa Creek. During that time, the main flow of the Murray may have also followed the course of the current Bullatale Creek The Northern lake continued to exist at that time, with evidence of silt jetties being formed towards present day Barmah eventually draining to become a series of wetlands and swamps. The present-day Moira Lake and Barmah Lake are remnants of the Northern Lake.

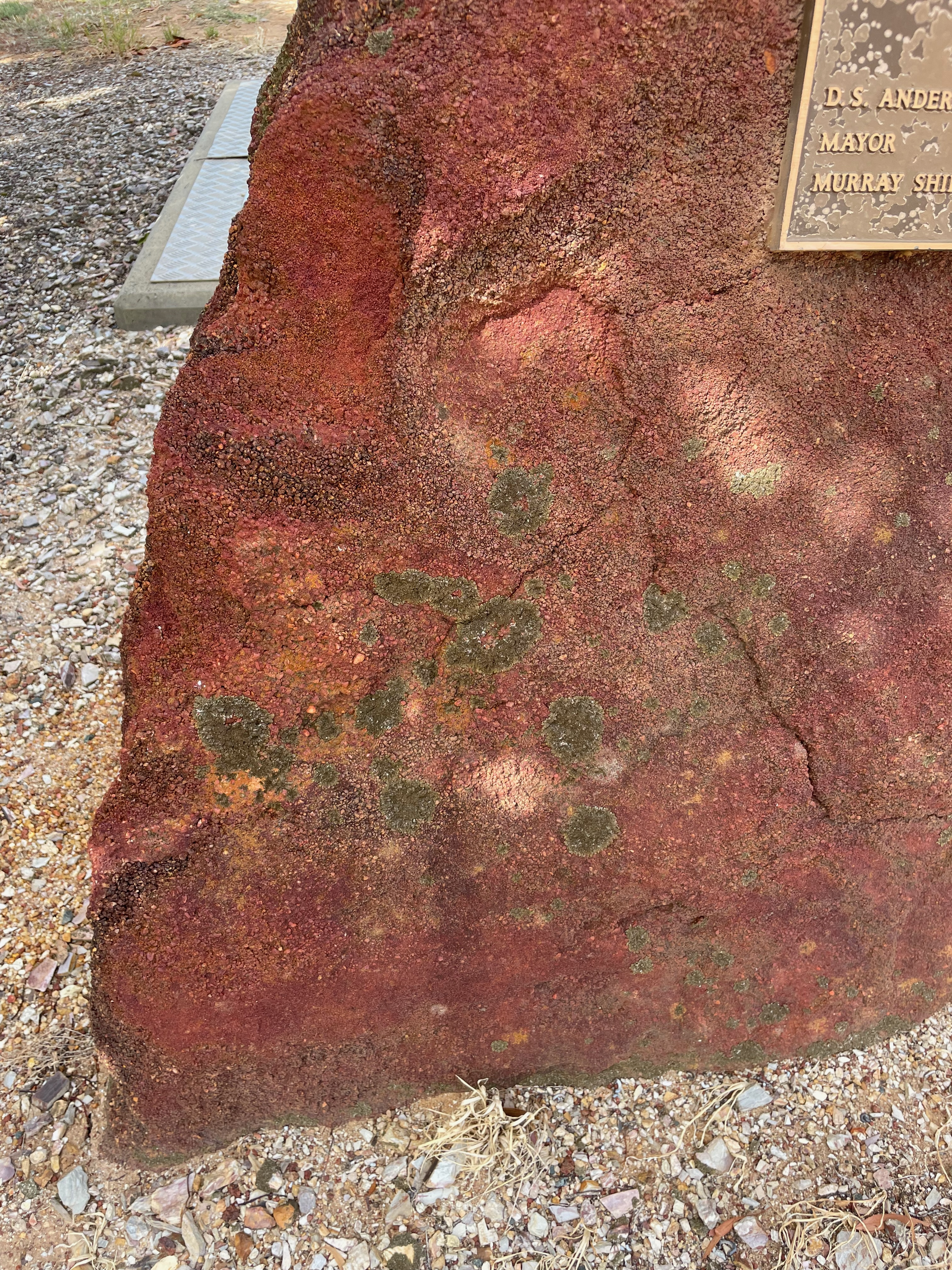
The pressure of the uplift fused sand into distinctive red rocks. The area around Mathoura was known for a period as Redbank. This rock can be seen on the corner of the Cobb Highway and Mitchell Street where it has been used to memorialise the opening of the sewerage pumping works.

Recent research indicates that the current course of the Murray River through the Narrows (also known as the Barmah Choke) may have originated in recent history, possibly as recently as approximately 550 years ago (approximately 1450 CE). Indeed, local Aboriginal legend is that the Aboriginal population of the region at the time was instrumental in the formation of the current path of the Murray. Their folklore has it that the local Aborigines carved a channel through the sandbank holding the waters of the Northern Lake back, which then allowed the water to flow into the Goulburn River and form the current course of the Murray. The Narrows were noted by early squatters in the area to be somewhat unusual given its straight sides, compared to the more sloping bank formation of mature rivers

The damming of the Murray by the Cadell Fault directly led to the creation of the Barmah Red Gum Forests, now protected by the Barmah National Park in Victoria and Murray Valley National Park in New South Wales. The damming caused the creation of an alluvial fan (through aggradation) on which the red gum forests established, and the ongoing flooding and draining of the area has led to the arboreal ecosystem present today.

=== Edward ===
The Edward River owes a significant part of its origin to the rise of the Cadell fault. Whilst not studied in as much detail as the course of the Murray, water flowing out of the Northern Lake may have found a previous tributary of the Murray and made its course across to the present day confluence with the Wakool River and eventually the Murray at Kyalite.

=== Goulburn ===
Similar to the Murray, the Goulburn River formerly followed a path to the north of its current one, flowing through the Broken Creek and meeting with the former Murray (now Green Gully) somewhere south-west of Mathoura, where it continued westward.

With the uplift of the Cadell, a large lake was also formed south of the Northern Lake, which was the predecessor of present-day Lake Kanyapella, the remnant of the larger prehistoric lake. Wind-blown, or aeolian, movement of surface soils created the Barmah Sandhills on the north-eastern edge of the lake. Over time, water flowed from the lake into the Campaspe River, and the Goulburn River changed its course to follow that path. Eventually, erosive water flows drained the prehistoric Lake Kanyapella along the course of the current Murray River.

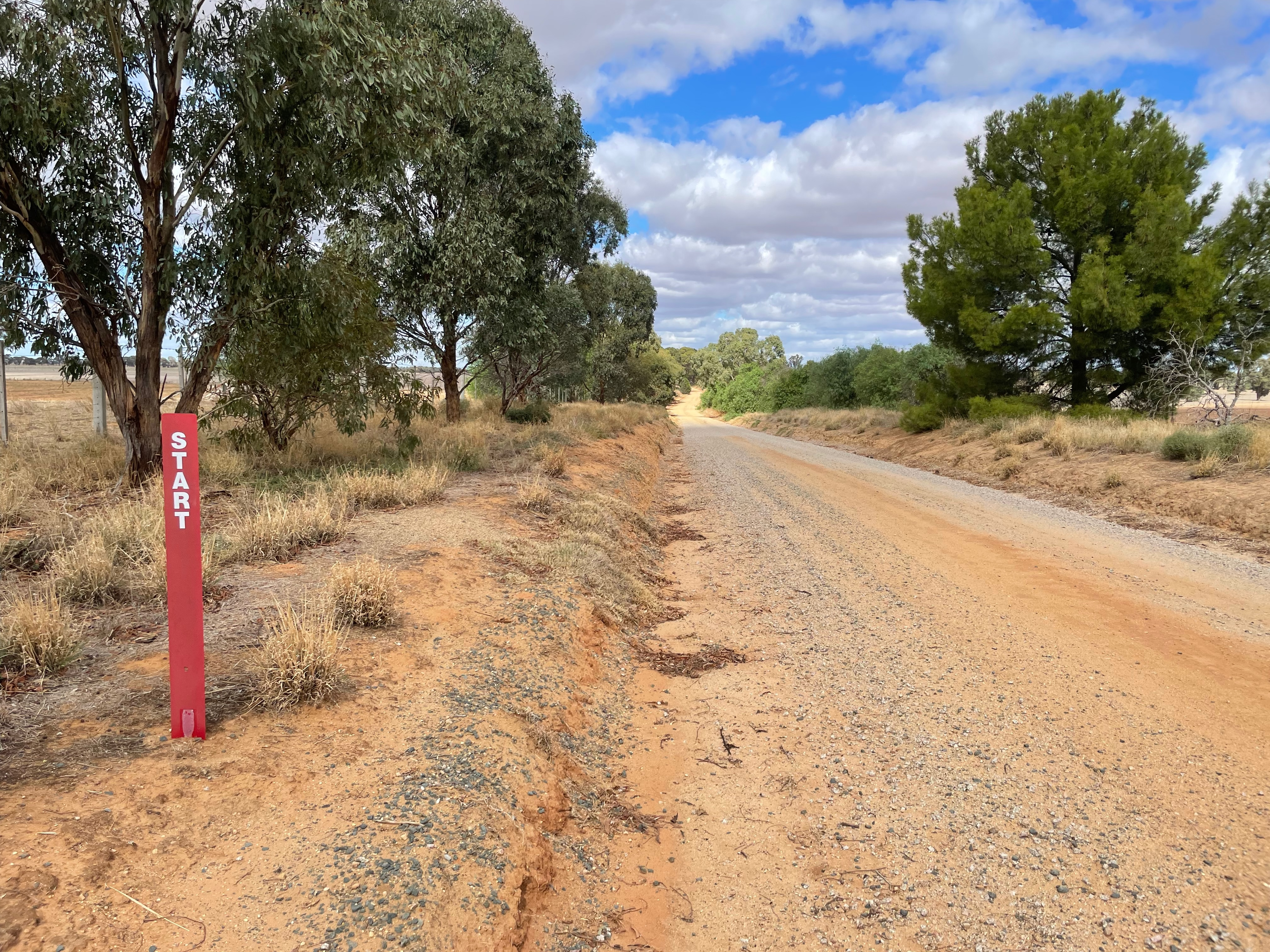
Stirling Park Road south of Bunallo Road, looking south across Green Gully the old course of the Murray River

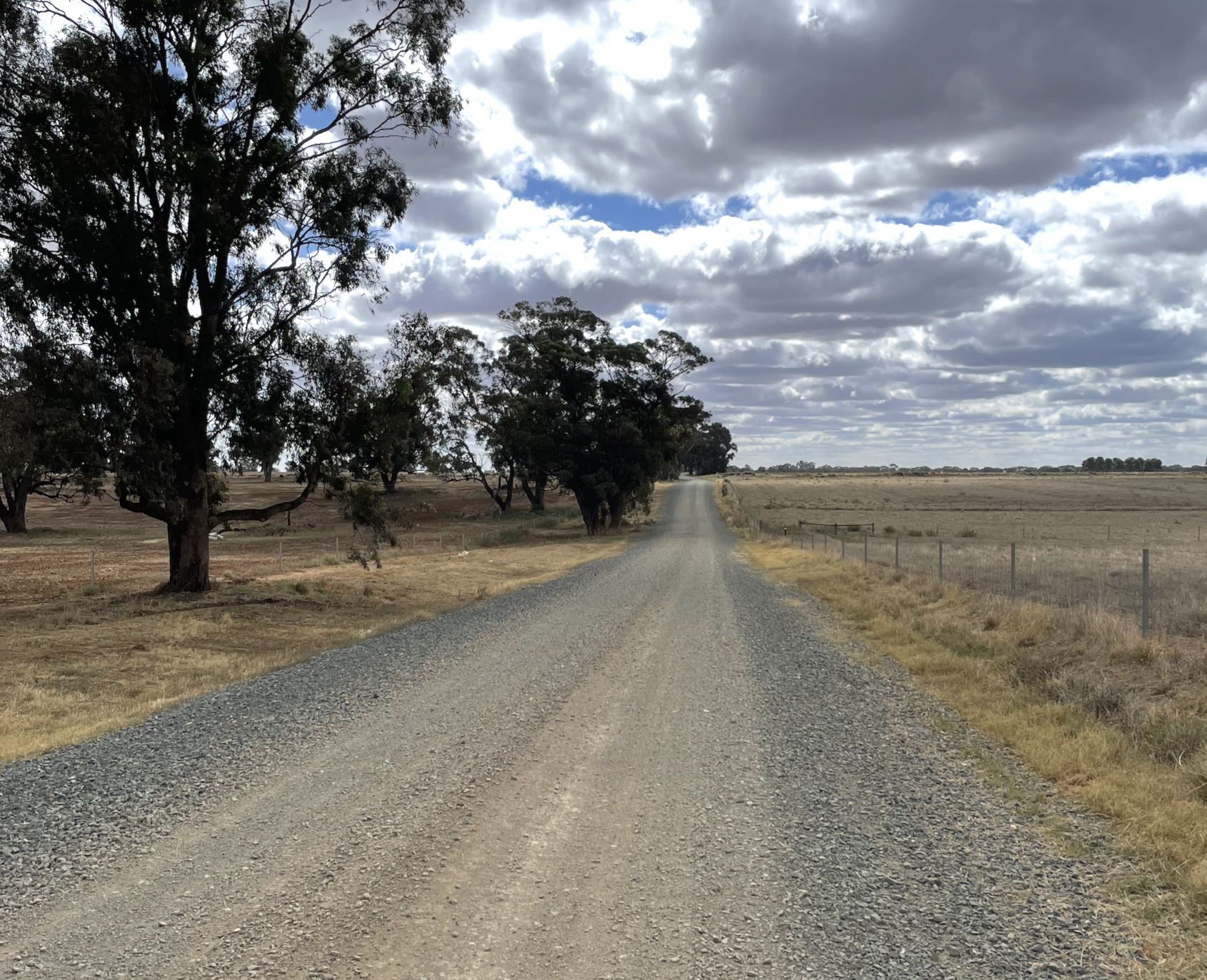
Solly Road south of Bunallo Road, looking north across Green Gully the old course of the Murray River

=== Campaspe ===
The path of the Campaspe River was less affected by the Cadell fault, but the routing of both the Goulburn and the Murray rivers down the course of the ancient Campaspe, instead of both rivers continuing westwards towards Kyalite, had the effect of making the Campaspe upstream of Echuca a tributary of the new Murray and making its reaches from Kaarimba to Kanyapella part of the Goulburn River.

== Ongoing management ==
As the location of a significant tectonic event, and due to the population and production importance of the region to Australia, Geoscience Australia has studied the likelihood of further earthquake activity involving the fault. Based on modelling of the maximum credible earthquake, of moment magnitude scale (MMS) 7.2, the damage incurred would be catastrophic, with over 1,000 square kilometres of land suffering 50% loss of structures. A potentially more likely earthquake, of MMS 6.8, would do less damage in itself but, due to the increased possibility of such an occurrence, may be more of a risk. Those estimates are based on the information presently available, and Geoscience Australia has not specified its confidence in them.

Future movement of the Cadell fault could also affect the courses of rivers, as it has done in the past.

== Novel set in this area ==
Chris Hammer's novel The Tilt, is set in this area. The towns have pseudonyms. Mathoura appears as ‘Tulong’. Deniliquin is Hatheson, Moama is Boonlea, and Anglers Reach represents Picnic Point on the Murray.

== See also ==
- Plate tectonics
- Fault (geology)
