= Edward River =

River in New South Wales, Australia

Coordinates: 34°58′54.87″S 143°29′27.19″E

Edward River Kyalite River
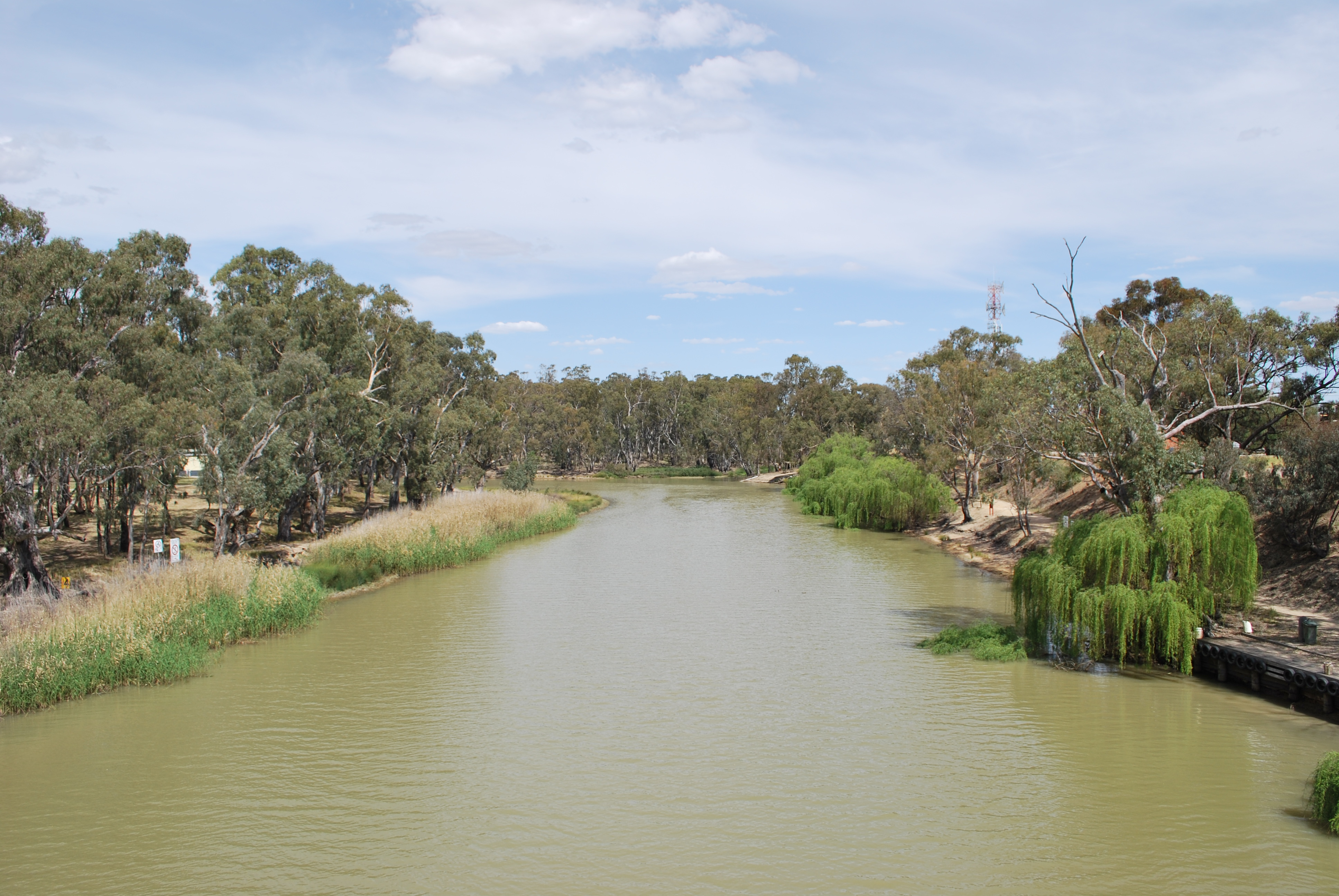
- Edward River, near Deniliquin
- Native name: Kolety (Wemba Wemba)

Location
- Country: Australia
- State: New South Wales
- Region: Riverina (IBRA)
- Municipalities: Murray, Deniliquin, Wakool

Physical characteristics
- Source: Murray River
  - location: at Picnic Point, near Mathoura
  - elevation: 110 m (360 ft)
- Mouth: confluence with the Wakool River
  - location: at Wakool Junction, near Kyalite
  - elevation: 61 m (200 ft)
- Length: 383 km (238 mi)

Basin features
- River system: Murray River, Murray–Darling basin

Edward River, or Kolety is an anabranch of the Murray River and part of the Murray–Darling basin, is located in the western Riverina region of south-western New South Wales, Australia.

The river rises at Picnic Point east of Mathoura, as a result of the bottleneck created in the Murray by the Cadell Fault, and flows generally north through river red gum forest, reaching Deniliquin and then flowing generally west through Moulamein. It is joined by six minor tributaries, before reaching its confluence with the Wakool River and re-entering the Murray at Wakool Junction, near Kyalite. The river descends 49 metres (161 ft) over its 383-kilometre (238 mi) course.

Kolety was gazetted as a dual official name for the river in 2006.

== See also ==
- Rivers of New South Wales
- List of rivers of Australia
