= Barnes, New South Wales =

Barnes New South Wales
- Coordinates: 36°1′48″S 144°47′24″E
- Postcode(s): 2731
- Location: 795 km (494 mi) from Sydney; 238 km (148 mi) from Albury; 28 km (17 mi) from Mathoura; 11 km (7 mi) from Moama
- LGA(s): Murray River Council
- County: Cadell
- State electorate(s): Murray
- Federal division(s): Farrer

Barnes is a small town in the far central south part of the Riverina and situated about 11 kilometres (6.8 mi) north of Moama and 13 kilometres (8.1 mi) north of Echuca.

Because of geography, it is in the sphere of influence of the adjoining state of Victoria, which explains why its railway connection goes to Victoria.

Barnes Post Office opened on 1 January 1928 and closed in 1972.
