= Border Railways Act 1922 =

Victorian legislation

Parliament of Victoria
- Long title: An Act to ratify and provide for carrying out an Agreement between the States of New South Wales and Victoria respecting the Construction Maintenance and Operation of certain Lines of Railway in the State of New South Wales and the State of Victoria the Construction and Maintenance of certain Bridges over the River Murray and other Works and for other purposes.
- Citation: 13 Geo. V. No. 3194
- Royal assent: 21 November 1922

The 1922 Border Railways Acts, were acts passed by the parliaments of both Victoria and New South Wales, which authorised the construction of cross border railways in the Riverina region of Australia. Despite being located in New South Wales, the region was closer economically to Victoria and its railway network, operated by Victorian Railways. Another complication was that Victorian Railways used the 1,600 mm (5 ft 3 in) broad gauge, while the New South Wales Government Railways used 1,435 mm (4 ft 8 1/2 in) standard gauge.

== Background ==
The first 1,600 mm (5 ft 3 in) line to be built from Victoria into New South Wales was the Deniliquin - Moama line. Permission was granted to the private Deniliquin and Moama Railway Company by the New South Wales Government in 1874 to construct a 72 kilometres (45 mi) long line from Moama on the Murray River north to Deniliquin, connecting with the Victorian railway system at the Murray Bridge, near Echuca. Opened in 1876, it was later purchased by Victorian Railways.

In 1904, the Victorian Parliament authorised an extension of the Goulburn Valley line 13.2 kilometres (8.2 mi) north from Strathmerton station, to the south bank of the Murray River across from Tocumwal. The line was opened in February 1905, and in April 1906, the two state Premiers (Thomas Bent and Joseph Carruthers) signed an agreement for a final 3.3 kilometres (2.1 mi) extension, into the town itself. The existing road bridge was strengthened and became the responsibility of Victoria, with both states sharing construction costs for the line. Opened in 1908, the profit (or loss) of operating the line would be Victoria's. In the station became a break-of-gauge in 1914 with extension of the NSWGR Tocumwal line.

== Impact of the acts ==
As a result of the predicament of border towns, the Border Railways Commission (made up of representatives of both states) recommended in 1917 in favour of the construction of four additional lines into New South Wales. The most important line was to run from Swan Hill to Balranald. The culmination was the 1922 Border Railways Acts of both states, with the first outcome being that Victorian Railways took over the Deniliquin and Moama Railway Company in 1923 at a cost of £165,000. The actual construction differed from that initially proposed.

- The Balranald line was to have left the Victorian network at Swan Hill, but instead branched from the Deniliquin line at Barnes. Opened in 1926, it was shortened to Moulamein in 1986, to Caldwell in 2006 and Barnes in 2008. It stopped carrying passengers and only transported rice some time before complete closures.
- The Murrabit - Stony Crossing line was opened in 1928. It left the Yungera line at Kerang station but was not a great success as it ran through marginal land, and closed in 1943. In its initial year of opening from 1928, the Railway Construction Branch renamed the final station (as up until then the referred to terminus of Stony Crossing) to "Poonboon" after nearby Lake Poonboon. By the following year's Railway Construction Branch Report - 1929 - The terminus name had reverted to "Stony Crossing". The line was never "handed over" to the VR "proper" with the VR never assuming the debt for the construction of the line and the line was operated by the Railway Construction Branch for its entire existence.
- The Yarrawonga - Oaklands line opened in 1938 and met the NSWGR Oaklands line at a break-of-gauge. It remains open today for grain traffic and has been converted to standard gauge.
- The line from Robinvale to Lette never officially opened, but the Railway Construction Branch ran an annual train on it from 1932 until it was dismantled in 1943. The railway was in fact an extension from Manangatang, Victoria to Lette N.S.W. in one Act (via Robinvale). Rails were laid as far as Korrakee N.S.W. The VR Commissioners' Train visited Korrakee in 1936 with Chairman of Commissioners, Clapp (with locomotive D1 600) and a year later in 1937 with Chairman of Commissioners, Clapp with locomotive D3 683, the then Commissioners’ Locomotive being specially fitted with electric headlight. The line was never "handed over" to the VR "proper" with the VR never assuming the debt for the construction of the line and was operated by the Railway Construction Branch for its entire existence. Goods trains did operate with VR crews to Euston, Benanee and Korrakee, and in final years by individual wagons being conveyed to and from Robinvale by horse haulage
- A final railway was authorised from Mildura to Gol Gol over the Mildura bridge built in 1927. The Railway Construction Branch Reports say that the Gol Gol railway from Mildura into New South Wales was to be a 10 to 15 miles (16 to 24 km) construction to the north-east of Mildura. This line was never commenced.

Schedule 1 to the Victoria Border Railways Act 1922 (13 Geo. V. No. 3194 (Vic)) also provided that two engineers, one of whom shall be appointed by the Government of New South Wales and one by the Victorian Government, shall recommend the sites of two bridges to be constructed between a point 3 miles upstream from Mildura Wharf and downstream to a point near the Wentworth Township. The bridges were to provide for both road and rail traffic. Suitable bridges were built at both Mildura and Yelta, but no railway lines were built.
