= Balranald railway line =

Former railway line in Victoria, Australia

Overview
- Status: Reactivated
- Locale: Riverina, New South Wales, Australia
- Coordinates: 36.026°S 144.7909°E
- Termini: Barnes; Balranald
- Stations: Wakool, Moulamein

History
- Opened: 26 March 1926
- Closed beyond Moulamein: 1986
- Closed beyond Caldwell: March 9, 2006
- Closed beyond Barnes: May 12, 2008
- Closed: May 12, 2008
- Reopened: November 20, 2024

Technical
- Line length: 193.53 km (120.25 mi)
- Track gauge: 1,600 mm (5 ft 3 in)
- Operating speed: 30 km/h (19 mph)

The Balranald railway line was a Victorian Railways broad gauge line that branched from Barnes on the Deniliquin railway line and ran to Balranald. The building of the line was sanctioned under the Border Railways Act 1922.

The Balranald branch line was opened on 26 March 1926. The section from Moulamein to Balranald was closed in 1986. The bridge across Yanga Creek near Balranald was subsequently demolished to make way for a realignment of the Sturt Highway. The sections of the line between Caldwell and Moulamein, and Barnes and Caldwell, were closed in 2006 and 2008 respectively.

On 20 November 2024, about 4 km section of the line up to Centre Road level crossing at Barnes was reopened as a stub siding.
