= Francis Cadell (explorer) =

Scottish mariner, explorer and blackbirder (1822–1879)

Francis William Cadell
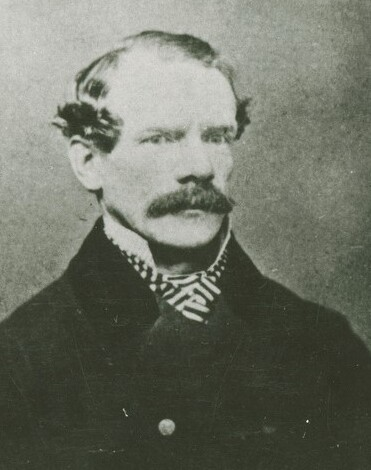
- Born: 9 February 1822; Cockenzie, Haddingtonshire, Scotland
- Died: March 1879 (aged 57) near New Guinea
- Occupations: ship's captain, explorer, blackbirder
- Parent: Hew Francis Cadell (father)

Francis William Cadell (9 February 1822 – 1879) was a Scottish explorer of Australia, mostly remembered for opening the Murray River up for transport by steamship and for his activities as a blackbirder, where he systematically kidnapped Indigenous people to work as slaves on his pearling and trepanging interests in northern Australia.

== Early life ==
Cadell was born in 1822 in Cockenzie, Haddingtonshire, Scotland. He was the second son of Hew Francis Cadell, a mine-owner and shipbuilder from a notable Scottish family.

His brother, Thomas, was a notable British soldier and administrator. Another brother, Robert, joined the Royal Artillery.

Francis went to sea as a crewman on the East Indiaman, at just 14 years of age. He was fifth mate on that vessel when it sailed to China in 1839, where it was involved in the First Opium War. During that time, he claimed to have taken part in the siege of Canton.

By 1844, he was serving on the Royal Sovereign which sailed to ports in Europe and South America. In 1846, he returned to Scotland where he studied shipbuilding and the application of steam-power in the workshops of Robert Napier and Sons.

He first arrived in Australia in January 1849 as captain of the schooner Royal Sovereign, visiting Adelaide, Circular Head and Sydney, sailing in ballast for Singapore in June.

== Navigation of the Murray river ==
In 1850, the government of South Australia offered a prize for the first two ships to navigate the Murray River up to the Darling River. Cadell had a ship, the s/s Lady Augusta, built specifically for the purpose.

He proved that the river was navigable to Albury and Gundagai. While credited as the first person to navigate the river, William Randell had a claim to priority. Murray was given a gold medal by the Legislative Council.

Cadell was later a co-founder of the River Murray Navigating Company but, after some early success, the company went bust.

== Relocation to New Zealand ==
In 1865, Cadell was in New Zealand employed by the New Zealand government as commandant in the Waikato Steam Transport Service, a support group during the New Zealand Wars.

In March 1865, Cadell was involved in the mutiny of Captain Hannibal Marks on HMS Sandfly. Cadell ordered the first mate of Sandfly to get underway without its captain. When Marks caught the ship in a row boat, he placed the mate under arrest for taking orders from Cadell. Cadell then ordered Marks to reinstate the mate and fire another crew member. Marks refused and the crew sided with Marks.

== 1867 expedition to Northern Australia ==
In 1867, the South Australian Government sent Cadell on an expedition to the Northern Territory. His modus operandi was much criticised at the time, for his employment of men from New South Wales rather than experienced South Australians, for choosing the ex-paddle-wheeler Eagle for transport, and for taking few, if any, horses, without which any inland exploration was futile.

He approached the Northern Territory by ship, and his choice of site was influenced by the navigability of the river. He traversed a strait between Elcho Island and the mainland, which Matthew Flinders had previously noted as a probable island.

During the expedition an Aboriginal party-member called Tommy tried to desert three times and was imprisoned on the ship. Tommy reportedly drowned whilst making a fourth escape attempt, although Cadell indicated in a separate report that he had in fact been murdered by other party-members.

== Blackbirder ==
During the early 1870s, Cadell became involved in whaling, trading, pearling and blackbirding in North-West Australia. Cadell and others became notorious for their coercion, capture and sale of Aboriginal people as slaves. The slaves were often detained temporarily at camps known as barracoons on Barrow Island, 56 kilometres (35 mi) offshore.

In 1874 he engaged 10 people at Batavia, described as Malays. In 1875 magistrate Robert Fairbairn was sent to investigate pearling conditions at Shark Bay, following reports that Malays employed by Cadell and Charles Broadhurst were unpaid, unable to return home and some had starved to death. Fairbairn held that Cadell was required to pay the 10 Malays plus an additional 4 months wages as amends for the lack of food, totaling £198. 14s. 4d, equivalent to A$29,566.37 in 2022. They received just £16. 16s, equivalent to A$2,499.57, from the sale of Cadell's property at Shark Bay as Cadell had left the Colony of Western Australia some months previously.

In 1878, Cadell was investigated by police for the kidnapping of around forty Aboriginal Australians from the Cobourg Peninsula region of what is now called the Northern Territory. He had also kidnapped a number of Aboriginal people from Queensland. He forced them to work on his luggers, diving for pearls and sea cucumbers. There were several mutinies of his captives due to his harsh treatment and fourteen people managed to escape and report him to the authorities. In 1879, he fled the region.

In 1879, he was killed by a crewman near New Guinea.

== See also ==
- Survey parties to the Northern Territory 1864–1870 Includes comprehensive lists of participants

== Sources ==
- Serle, Percival (1949). "Cadell, Francis". Dictionary of Australian Biography. Sydney: Angus & Robertson.
- Mennell, Philip (1892). "Cadell, Francis" . The Dictionary of Australasian Biography. London: Hutchinson & Co. pp. 75–76 – via Wikisource.
