= Mathoura =

- Town
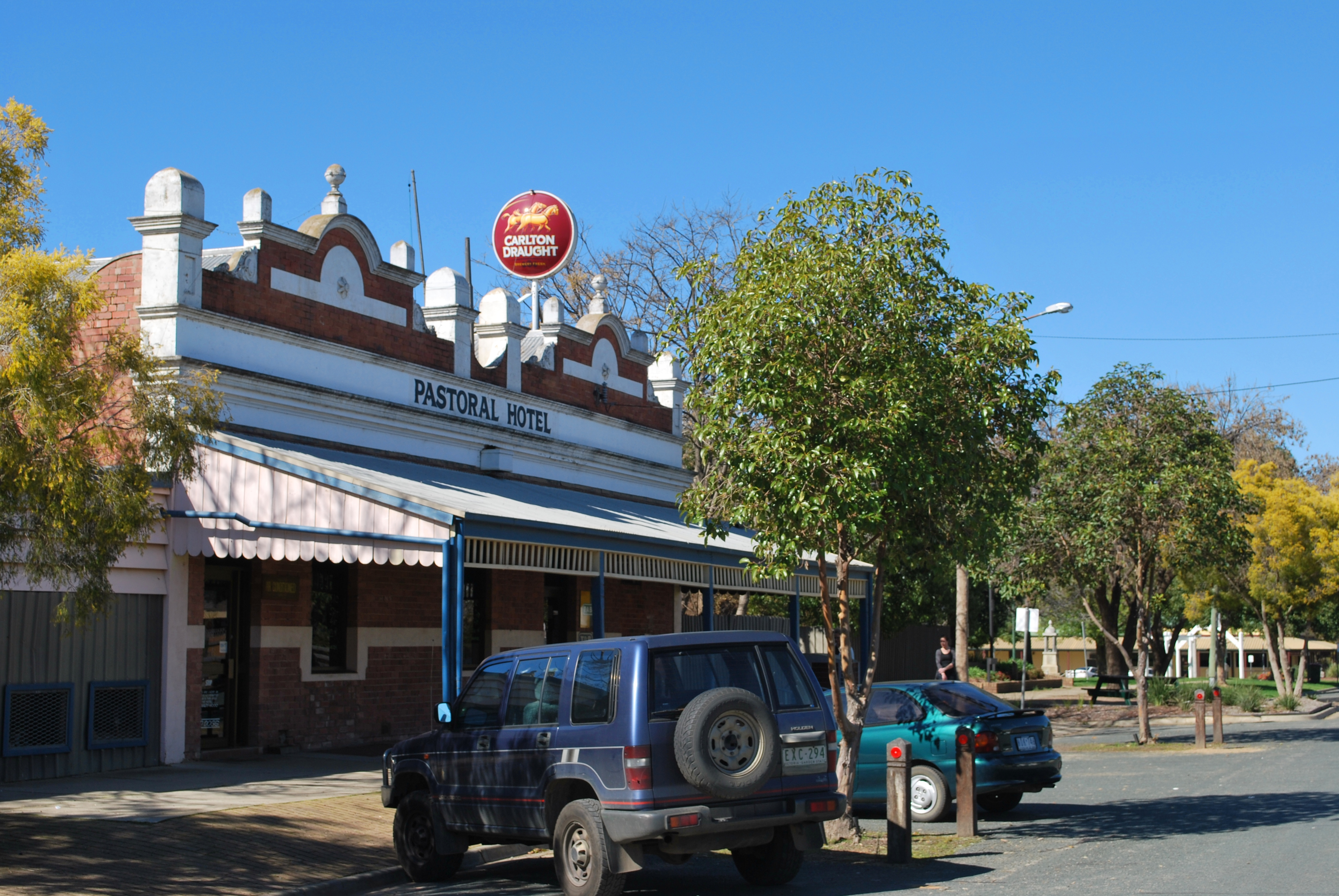
- Pastoral Hotel, with the Soldiers Memorial Garden and the Tattersalls Club Hotel in the background

- Coordinates: 35°49′0″S 144°54′0″E
- Country: Australia
- State: New South Wales
- LGA: Murray River Council
- Location: 790 km (490 mi) from Sydney; 258 km (160 mi) from Melbourne; 42 km (26 mi) from Echuca (Vic); 32 km (20 mi) from Deniliquin; 42 km (26 mi) from Barmah (Vic)
- Established: 1860

Government
  - State electorate: Murray
  - Federal division: Farrer
- Elevation: 105 m (344 ft)

Population
  - Total: 938 (2016 census)
- Postcode: 2710
- County: Cadell
- Mean max temp: 22.0 °C (71.6 °F)
- Mean min temp: 9.1 °C (48.4 °F)
- Annual rainfall: 437.3 mm (17.22 in)

Mathoura /məˈθaʊərə/ is a small town in the Riverina region of southern New South Wales, Australia, in the Murray River Council local government area. At the 2016 census, Mathoura had a population of 938. At the 2021 census the population was 1,002.

The town's name may be derived from a Yorta Yorta word for 'windy'. (There is also a city called Mathura in India.)

Traditional Yorta Yorta lands lie on both sides of the Murray River roughly from Cohuna to Albury / Wodonga. They include towns such as Echuca, Shepparton, Benalla, Corowa and Wangaratta and extend northwards to just south of Deniliquin.

== Cobb Highway ==
Mathoura is on the Cobb Highway named after the Cobb & Company Coach services that ran along the same route from the Murray River to Wilcannia on the Darling River.

Cobb & Co took over the coach run between Moama (Maiden's Punt) and Deniliquin from Bevan and Co after the opening of the Melbourne Echuca rail line in 1864 and ran the service until the opening of the Echuca-Deniliquin rail line in 1876.

Along this section, there were horse-changing stations at Yellow Waterhole (near the present Barmah turnoff), Moira Inn (just north of Moira Station), Mathoura, and Hill Plain.

== History - 1800s ==
In 1848 a reserve was established on Gulpa Creek by Surveyor Townsend. The locality became known as Redbank. By 1853 W. Moore Carter had established an inn at Redbank and in 1856 he was permitted to purchase 12 acres (4.9 ha) at £2 10s. per acre. By 1860 Carter had about 40 acres (16.2 ha) under cultivation, including a 5 acres (2.0 ha) vineyard.

A petition in 1859 called on the Government to put up the reserve at Redbank for sale. However, there were others who considered a more suitable position for a village was at Hill Plain, where Mr. Stuckey had erected an inn (opened in June 1860 and managed by John Atkinson).

In 1860 Surveyor McCulloch laid out the township of Redbank near the site of Carter's Redbank Inn. In 1864 Carter was growing tobacco at Redbank (from which cigars were manufactured).

A traveller passing through Redbank in mid-1865 stated that "Mr. Carter has established a brick public-house… situated on the bank of the Gulpa Creek". The writer added: "I observed three or four acres fenced and stocked with fruit trees, withered and dried up".

In 1865 Henry Burton, a circus proprietor, purchased the Redbank Inn; he held the licence until 1878 when it was transferred to T O'Sullivan.

Mathoura Post Office opened on 1 September 1867.

On 4 July 1876 the Deniliquin & Moama Railway opened. The station in the township of Mathoura was called Redbank. The line was quite flat, rising only 5m between Deniliquin and Moama. Redbank Station was at the summit (13m above Deniliquin) and initially was the only other station on the line. Redbank Station had a 76,000 litre tank which could be filled by a steam pump from the Gulpa Creek in 5 hours.

1877: A visitor returning in that year noted several changes including a powerful new crane at the Redbank Railway Station, a new and commodious refreshment room adjoining the ticket office, and a drinking fountain drawing on the pure sparkling water from the Gulpha Creek. As well as the Redbank and Bowtell’s Mathoura hotel (frequented generally by selectors) there was a butcher, draper, general store, blacksmith, and wheelwright. The extensive fish hauls from the Gulpha were sold into Melbourne via Echuca. The Redbank Saw-mills including Barbour’s supplied nearly the whole trade of Deniliquin with red-gum piles, sleepers, and building timber.

1879: On 2 June 1879, the Redbank Railway Station was renamed Mathoura. One reason was that Mathoura was the Government name for the town and parish. The other was that there was another Redbank (near Hillston) in NSW and one in Victoria and goods and parcels intended for Redbank, Victoria were frequently forwarded to the ‘Mathoura’ Redbank.

By 1879 it was reported that the village had about six houses of "straggling order" and was supported principally by the timber trade. By 1882 a flour mill had been established at Mathoura; there were two hotels, the Mathoura Inn and the Railway Hotel, as well as a school, a Union church and a sawmill.

1883: John Boothman, licensee of the Railway Refreshment Rooms, Mathoura, appeared before the Moama Police Court in March 1883. Constable Baynes deposed that he was on duty at the railway platform, Mathoura, at 10:30 on the night specified, when he saw dancing taking place in the ladies' waiting room and on the platform. The charge was dismissed.

1884: A bale of wool from Mathoura won third prize at the Amsterdam International Exhibition.

== History - 1900s ==
=== Mathoura and the campaign against the feather trade ===
In late 1906 and early 1907, Mathoura was the jumping-off point for the ornithologist and photographer A. H. E. Mattingley on two trips to the St Helena swampland on the Edward River to the northeast of the town.

On the second trip, he found the bodies of 50 white and plumed egrets shot by ‘plume hunters’ to sell to the fashion industry. Mattingley counted 70 nestlings that had died and 200 left to die of starvation.

Mattingley’s published outrage (and the 7 photographs he took) travelled around Australia and the world.

Mattingley’s work contributed to the already long-running campaign to eliminate the clothing industry's use of bird feathers. The wider campaign led to the US 1918 Migratory Bird Treaty Act and the Importation of Plumage (Prohibition) Act 1921 among other prohibitions.

=== First World War ===
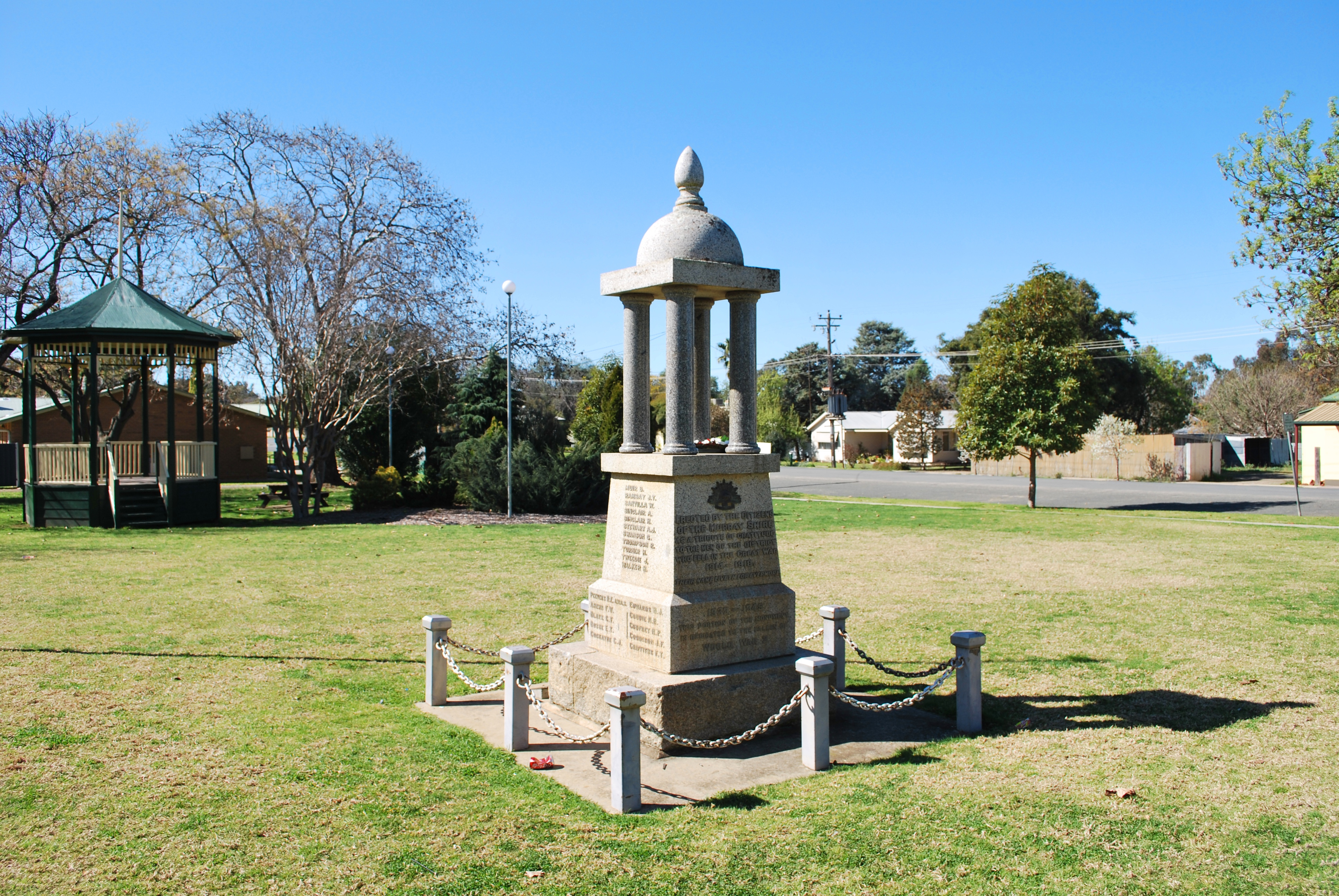
War Memorial unveiled 25 April 1934

The first Mathoura man to enlist for the First World War was Samuel Gardiner.

War was declared (by the UK) on 4 August and Gardiner enlisted on 16 September 1914 at the age of 22.

Gardiner was farewelled at a ceremony in the Shire Hall on Friday 13 November 1914. Speakers said they ‘appreciated his loyalty and courage in joining the colours, to protect, with thousands of others, the nation from German domination.’ Gardner replied saying that as a public speaker, he was no good, but at the front, he would do his best for the honour of Australia. (Loud applause.) The Chairman then presented Gardner with a ‘wristlet watch’.

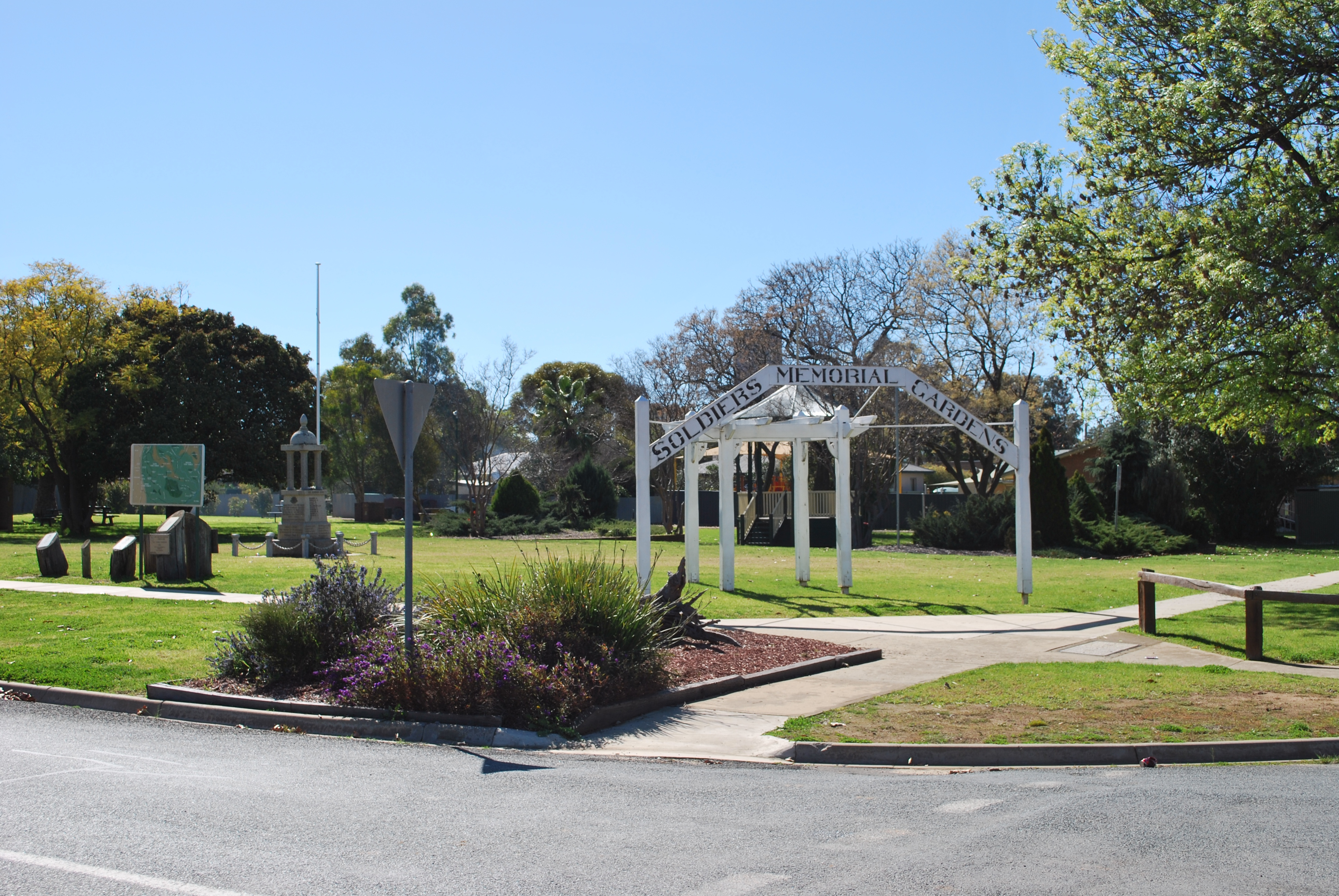
Soldiers Memorial Gardens established by the Mathoura branch of the Returned Soldiers, Sailors and Airmen's Imperial League of Australia.

Gardiner (service number 534, 14th Infantry Battalion 1st AIF), left Melbourne on HMAT Ulysses A38 on 22 December 1914. He was at Gallipoli from the landing until the last 'hop over' or attack on 21 August 1915 (Hill 60) in which he lost a leg. He returned to Australia on 8 May 1916 and to the Mathoura district where for a time he was Rabbit Inspector at Deniliquin. (Rabbit Inspectors were responsible for the administration and enforcement of the Pastures Protection Act which included the requirement for the landowner to suppress rabbits.)

In his last years, he was often in hospital due to his war injuries. He died 22 April 1933 at about age 41 in Royal Park.

Mathoura War Memorial: Report of unveiling. List of veterans

=== Mathoura’s day out. Victory picnic & procession ===
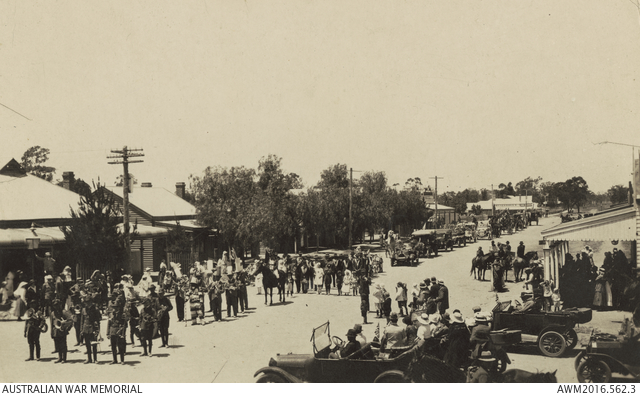
Mathoura's day out. Victory picnic and procession

When the armistice was signed, the residents of Mathoura decided to celebrate the event by holding a monster picnic on Wednesday 20 November 1918. The sports were preceded by a procession from the Murray Shire Chambers led by the Echuca Rangers' Band under the conductorship of Bandmaster F. E. Grimwood and Private Alexander Joss, who only returned home on the previous evening. Following the band were Miss Peters as John Bull, Red Cross nurses, and soldiers. Girls, ranging in age from 14 to five, represented all the Allied nations. Then came decorated cars followed by a Kiltie [Scots] Band (whose band leader 'a noted piper' came from Casterton), then decorated gigs, buggies, and carts.

== Climate ==
Climate data for Mathoura
Month	Jan	Feb	Mar	Apr	May	Jun	Jul	Aug	Sep	Oct	Nov	Dec	Year
Record high °C (°F)	44.7 (112.5)	44.2 (111.6)	40.8 (105.4)	34.9 (94.8)	27.2 (81.0)	26.6 (79.9)	19.4 (66.9)	23.1 (73.6)	33.3 (91.9)	37.8 (100.0)	41.7 (107.1)	41.9 (107.4)	44.7 (112.5)
Mean daily maximum °C (°F)	31.4 (88.5)	30.3 (86.5)	27.5 (81.5)	22.1 (71.8)	16.9 (62.4)	14.1 (57.4)	12.9 (55.2)	15.0 (59.0)	18.1 (64.6)	21.7 (71.1)	25.6 (78.1)	28.6 (83.5)	22.0 (71.6)
Mean daily minimum °C (°F)	15.5 (59.9)	15.2 (59.4)	13.2 (55.8)	9.2 (48.6)	6.1 (43.0)	4.3 (39.7)	3.3 (37.9)	4.2 (39.6)	5.9 (42.6)	8.7 (47.7)	10.7 (51.3)	13.1 (55.6)	9.1 (48.4)
Record low °C (°F)	5.6 (42.1)	5.8 (42.4)	2.8 (37.0)	1.3 (34.3)	−1.1 (30.0)	−3.3 (26.1)	−3.8 (25.2)	−2.6 (27.3)	−1.4 (29.5)	−0.7 (30.7)	0.8 (33.4)	4.4 (39.9)	−3.8 (25.2)
Average precipitation mm (inches)	32.3 (1.27)	23.5 (0.93)	35.8 (1.41)	28.0 (1.10)	40.6 (1.60)	36.8 (1.45)	42.6 (1.68)	43.4 (1.71)	41.8 (1.65)	41.6 (1.64)	34.7 (1.37)	34.6 (1.36)	436.3 (17.18)
Average precipitation days	3.8	3.6	4.3	5.3	8.0	9.0	10.5	10.6	8.9	7.7	6.1	5.2	83.0

== Today ==
The town has an Australian Rules football team competing in the Picola & District Football League.

Golfers play at the course of the Mathoura Golf Club on the Cobb Highway.

== See also ==
- Mathoura Football Club

== Redbank & the Tilt ==
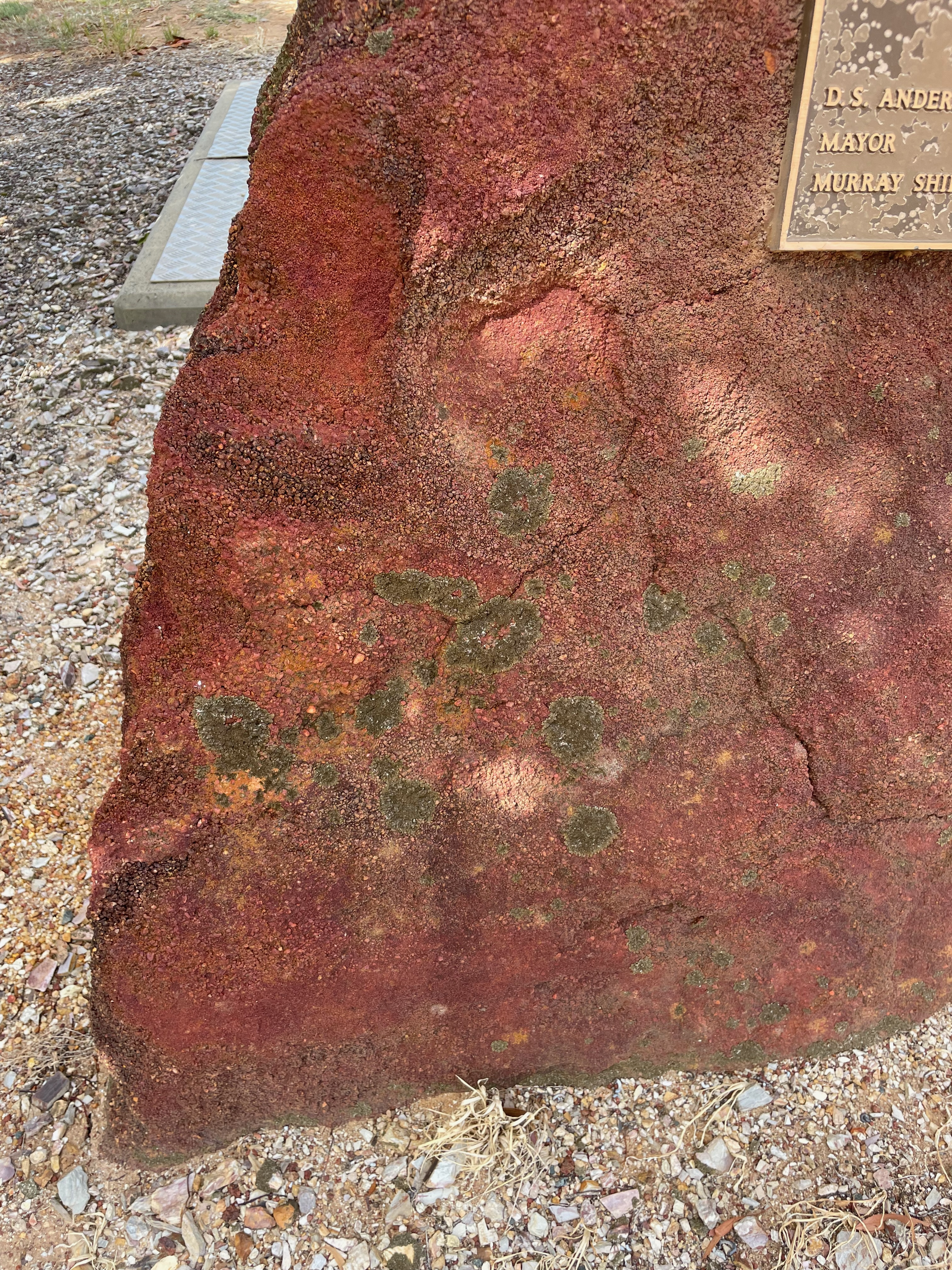
The forces that caused the Tilt fused sand into distinctive red rocks

Mathoura's early name 'Redbank' referenced the red-coloured rocks visible in the east face of the small cliff or fault scarp formed by the Cadell Fault or Tilt which can be seen near the town.

At some time or times 65,000 to 45,000 years ago earthquakes caused or found a crack in the earth’s crust. This energy escaped by pushing up a 60km wide, 250m thick section of crust, tilting it like a hinged and partly open trapdoor. Deniliquin and Echuca are at the northern and southern ends of the uplift with Mathoura in the middle, sitting on the high side and eastern edge of the Tilt.

The actual edge of the scarp is a few hundred metres east of the Cobb Highway. The Gulpa Creek east of the town winds along the base of the scarp.

The height and character of the scarp are most easily seen from the walking track on the far bank of the Gulpa Creek which follows the scarp and the creek. The path can be reached on foot by Cranes footbridge north of Clifton Street, a footbridge at the reserve on Gulpa Street North and the Pollys (Poleys) road Bridge to the south on the Jones Street/Picnic Point Road.

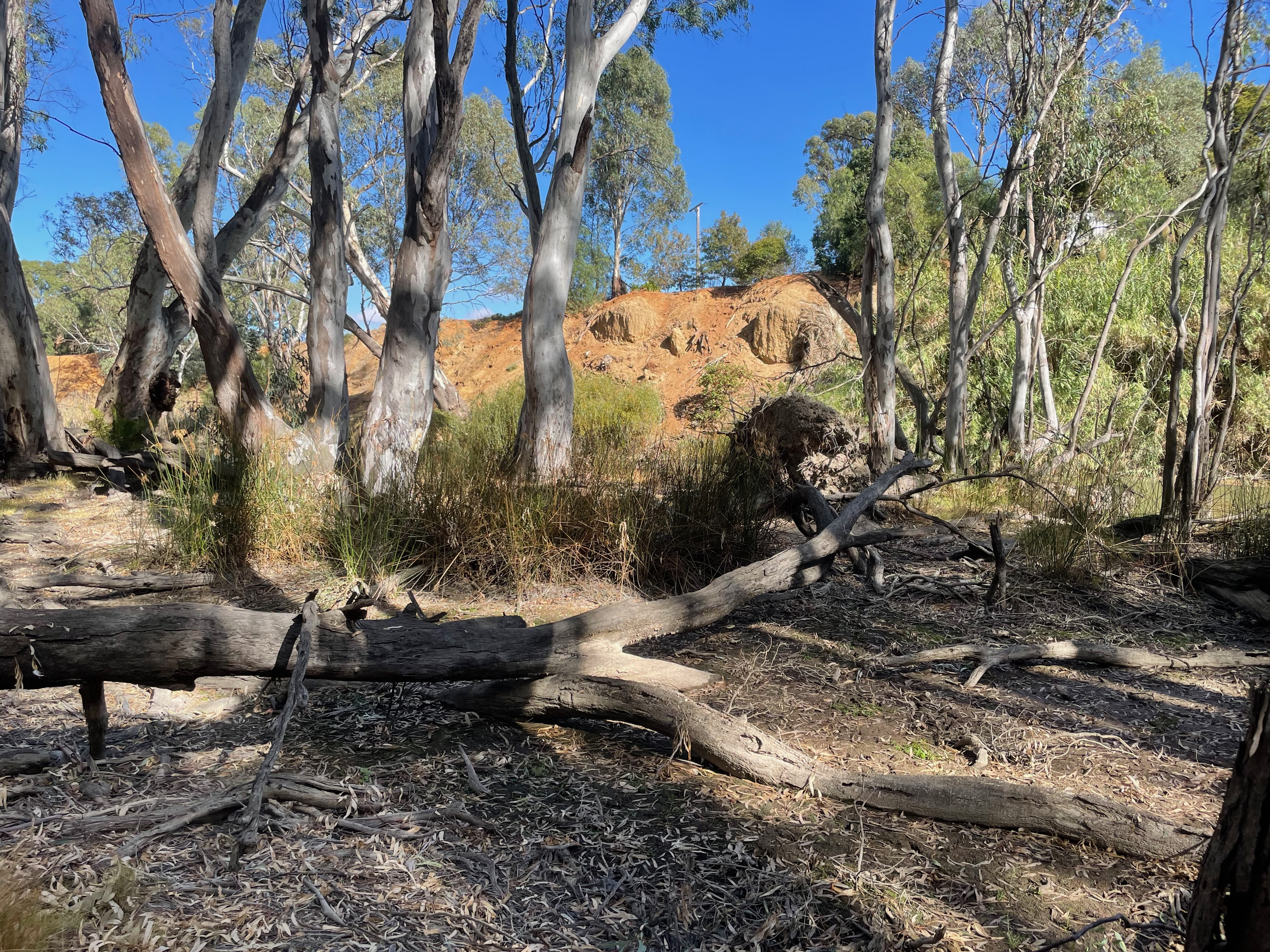
The Cadell uplift seen from the east side of Gulpa Creek looking west

The heat of the forces that lifted the crust, fused sand into striking, red-coloured rocks that gave the area its name. The intense redness of these rocks can be seen on the south side of Mitchell Street near its intersection with the Cobb Highway where a red rock has been used to support a plaque recording the NSW Governor’s presence at the ceremonial opening of the town’s sewerage pumping works.

In Chris Hammer’s novel The Tilt, Mathoura appears as ‘Tulong’. (Hatheson is the real-life Deniliquin, Boonlea is Moama, and Anglers Reach represents Picnic Point.)

== Green Gully – the former course of the Murray River ==
Thousands of years ago the Murray River ran through the area of Mathoura. But the Tilt formed a massive dam that blocked this route. The water backed up into large lakes before finding its way west around the blockage. Some water pushed around the north end of the Tilt on a course we call the Edward River. The channel around the southern end of the Tilt is today’s Murray.

The original and now empty Murray River watercourse (today called Green Gully) remains imprinted on the landscape.

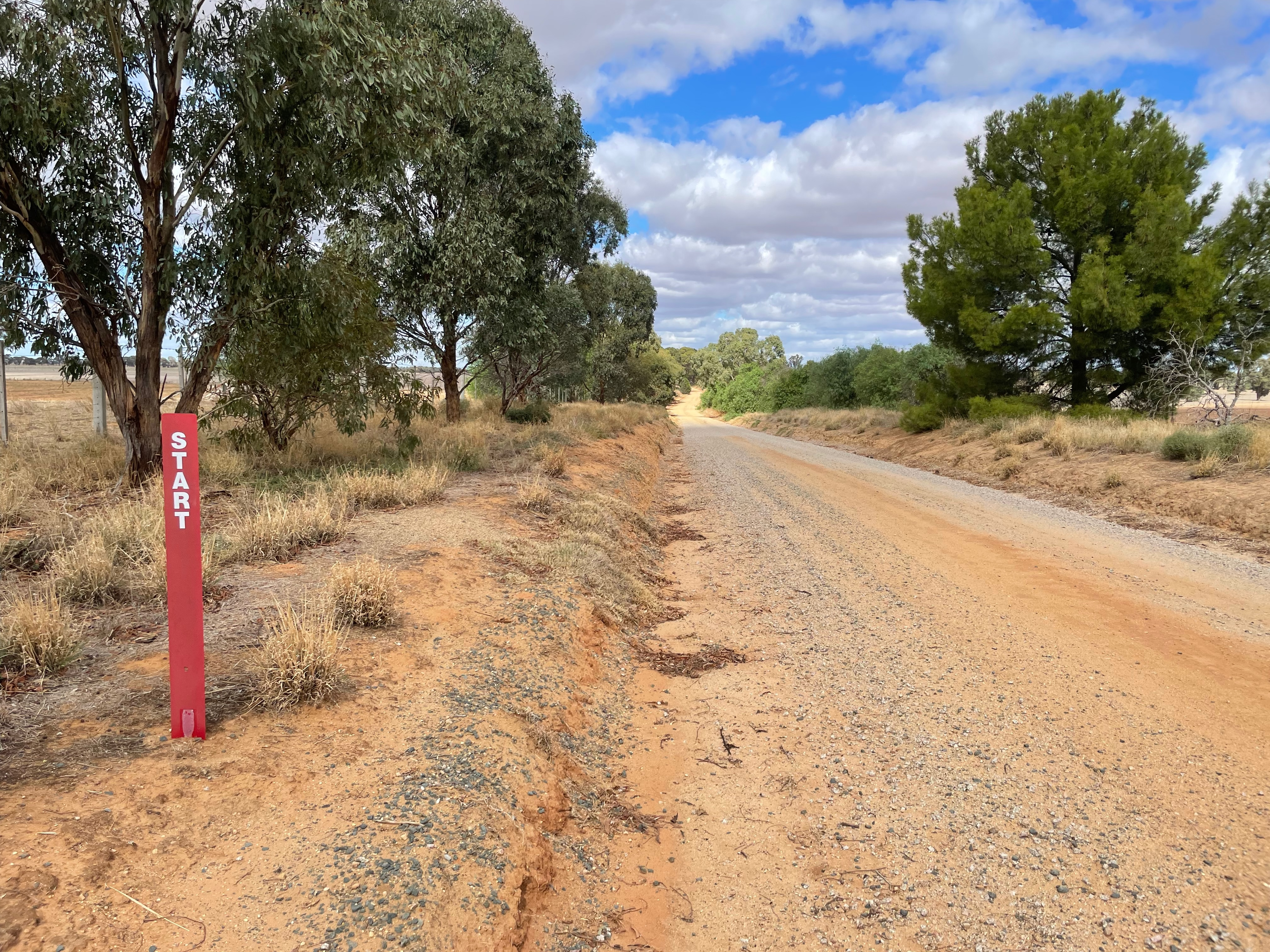
Looking south along Stirling Park Road into Green Gully

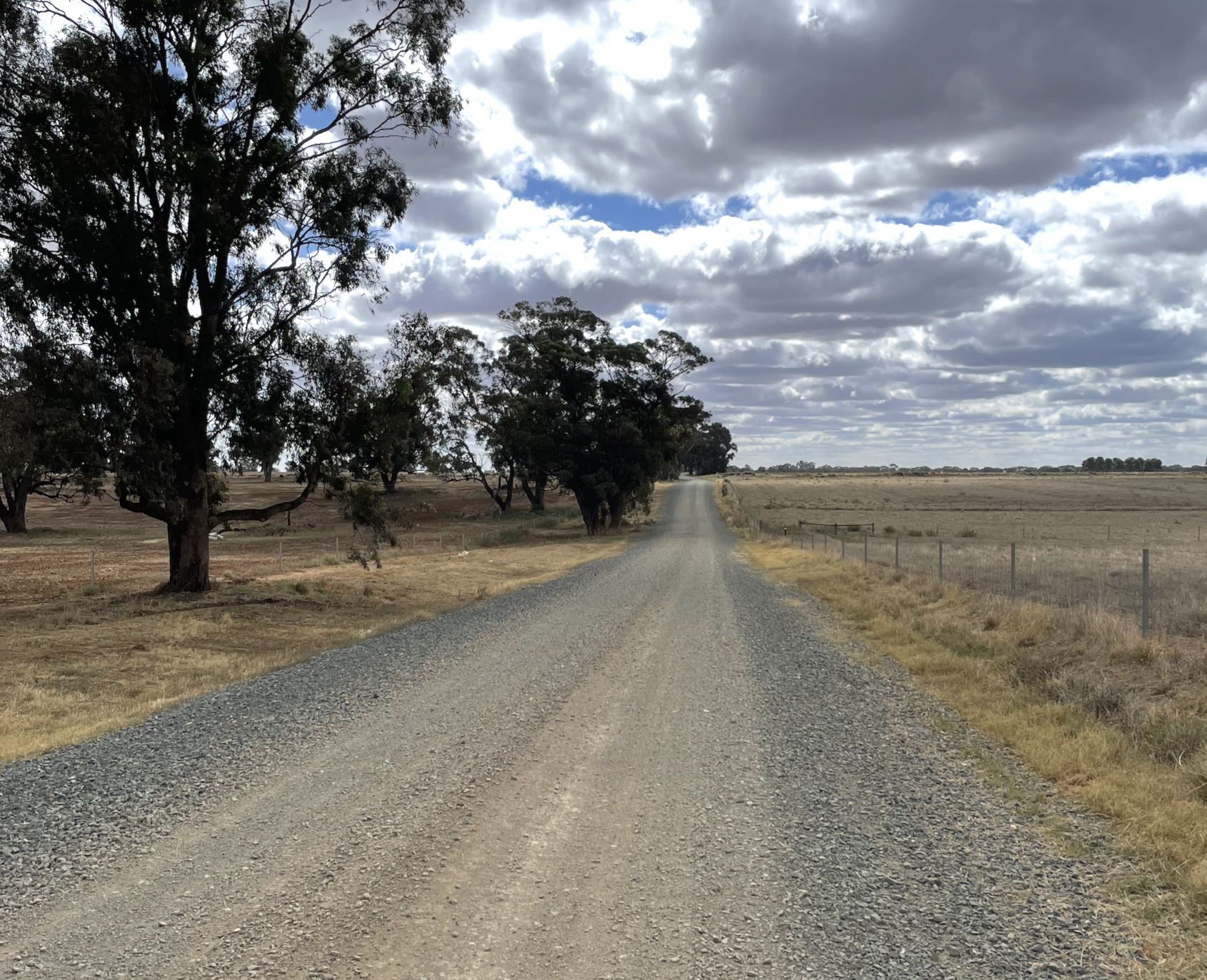
Looking north along Sully Road into Green Gully

The old Murray River channel can be seen clearly in aerial photographs. On the ground, just west of Mathoura, Stirling Park Road and Solly Road run across Green Gully.
