= Moolpa, New South Wales =

Moolpa
- Town
- Coordinates: 34°55′S 143°45′E
- Country: Australia
- State: New South Wales
- LGA: Murray River Council
- Location: 13 km (8.1 mi) from Perekerten; 34 km (21 mi) from Moulamein

Government
  - State electorate: Murray
  - Federal division: Farrer

Population
  - Total: 18 (SAL 2021)
- Postcode: 2733
- County: Wakool
- Annual rainfall: 325 mm (12.8 in)

Moolpa is a small rural community in the southwest part of the Riverina in New South Wales, Australia, and is named after a nearby sheep and wheat station. It is situated about 13 kilometres southwest of Pereketen and 34 kilometres northwest of Moulamein by road.
