= Niemur, New South Wales =

Niemur
- Town
- Coordinates: 35°14′46″S 144°12′46″E
- Country: Australia
- State: New South Wales
- LGA: Murray River Shire
- Location: 24 km (15 mi) from Moulamein; 27 km (17 mi) from Burraboi

Government
  - State electorate: Murray
  - Federal division: Farrer

Population
  - Total: 74 (SAL 2021)
- Postcode: 2733
- County: Wakool

Niemur is a historic village community in the central west part of the Riverina and the site of a railway station. It is situated about 24 kilometres south east of Moulamein and 27 kilometres north west of Burraboi.
