= Tullakool, New South Wales =

Tullakool
- Town
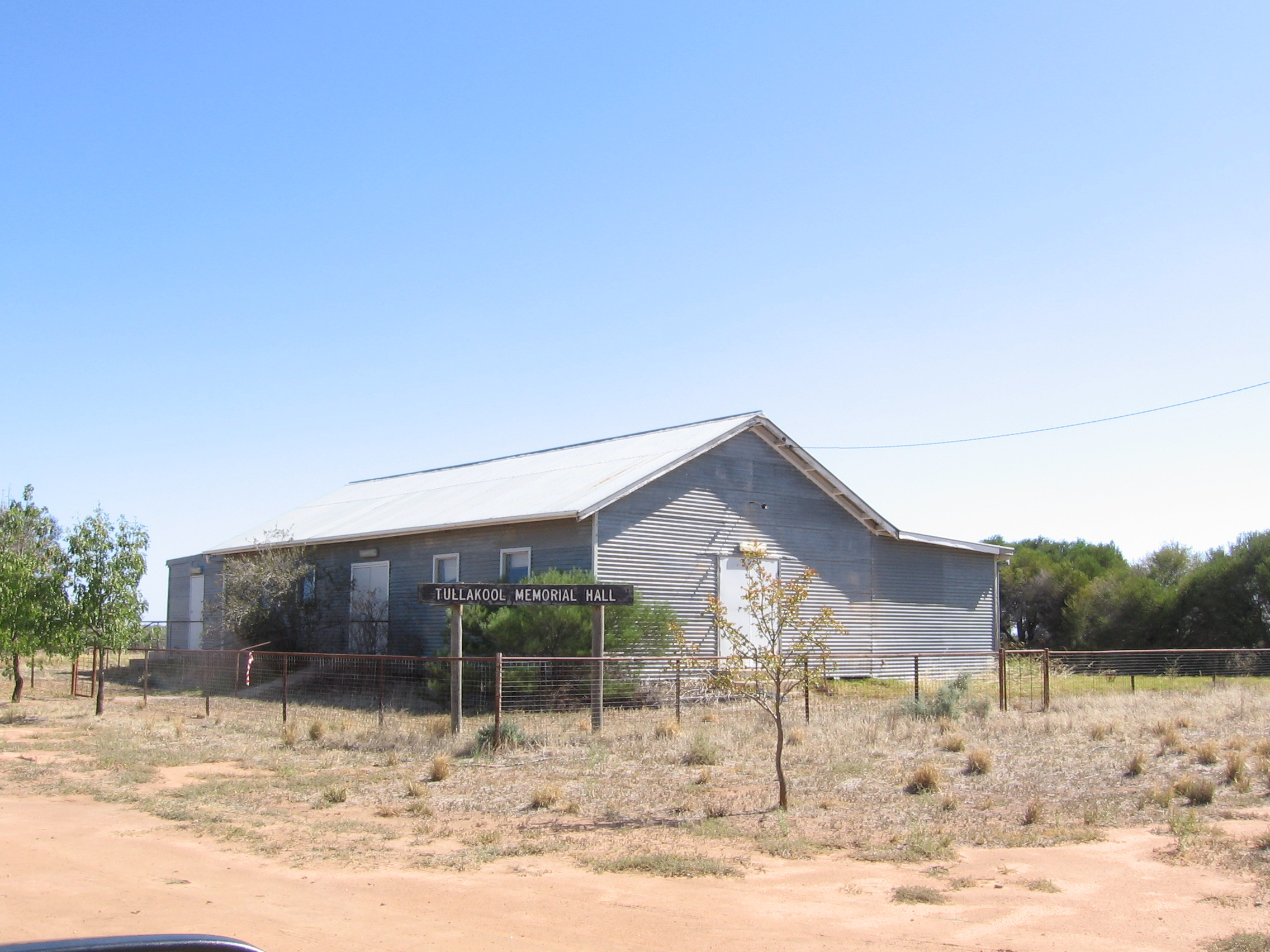
- Community Hall

- Coordinates: 35°22′0″S 144°09′0″E
- Country: Australia
- State: New South Wales
- LGA: Murray River Council
- Location: 818 km (508 mi) from Sydney; 293 km (182 mi) from Albury; 63 km (39 mi) from Swan Hill (VIC); 27 km (17 mi) from Wakool; 23 km (14 mi) from Burraboi

Government
  - State electorate: Murray-Darling
  - Federal division: Farrer

Population
  - Total: 68 (2021 census)
- Postcode: 2732
- County: Wakool
- Parish: Beremegad

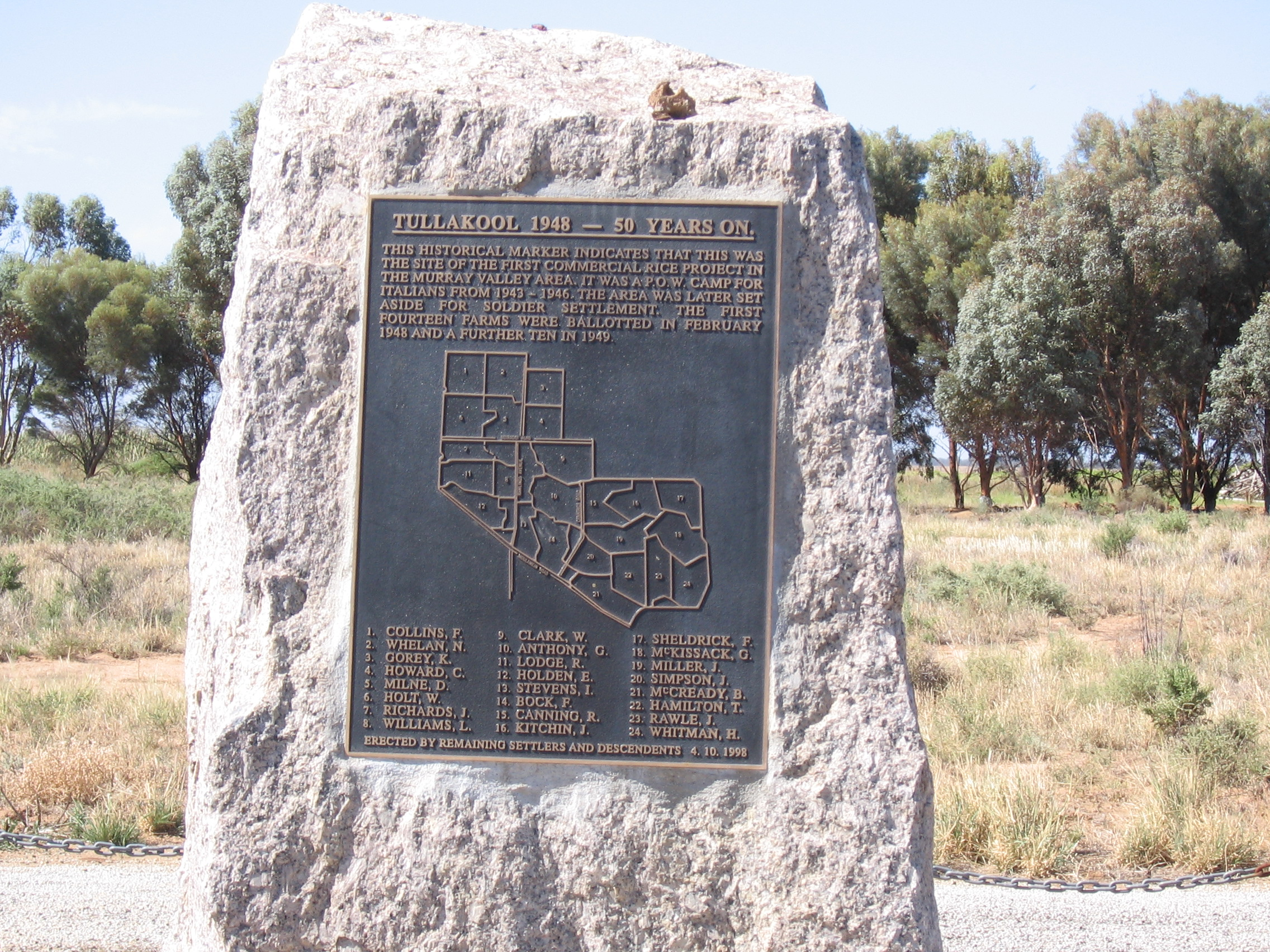
Memorial at Tullakool

Tullakool is a village community in the south west part of the Riverina. The place by road, is about 23 kilometres east from Burraboi and 27 km (17 mi) west from Wakool. It was the location of the first commercial rice crop in the Murray valley. At the 2021 census, Tullakool had a population of 68.

In 1948 the area was divided into Soldier settlement allotments.
