= Carex tereticaulis =

Conservation status
- Priority Three — Poorly Known Taxa (DEC)

Scientific classification
- Kingdom: Plantae
- Clade: Tracheophytes
- Clade: Angiosperms
- Clade: Monocots
- Clade: Commelinids
- Order: Poales
- Family: Cyperaceae
- Genus: Carex
- Species: C. tereticaulis

Binomial name
- Carex tereticaulis F.Muell. 1874

Species of grass-like plant

Carex tereticaulis, also known as basket sedge, is a species of sedge of the family Cyperaceae that is native to southern parts of Western Australia, southern parts of South Australia, southern and eastern parts of New South Wales as well as north western and central Victoria and Tasmania. The Koori peoples know the plant as Poong'ort.

== Description ==
The monoecious and rhizomatous perennial grass-like sedge has a tufted habit and typically grows to a height of 0.7 to 1.2 metres (2.3 to 3.9 ft). It blooms between September and October or November producing brown flowers. It has green coloured leaf blades that are typically about 20 cm (7.9 in) long on young plants, over time the blades become a dark yellow-brown colour that form a sheath about the cylindrical flower stems. The flowers are made up of small brown bracts that are clustered quite densely toward the terminus of the erect, green and hollow flowering stems. The dark brown fruits that form after flowering are an oval-shaped nut type seed that is only a few millimetres in diameter. The utricle of C. tereticaulis closely resembles that of Carex appressa.

== Taxonomy ==
The species was first described by the botanist Ferdinand von Mueller in 1874 as a part of the work Fragmenta phytographiae Australiae. There are five synonyms; Carex appressa var. elatior, Carex halmaturina, Carex tereticaulis var. septentrionalis, Carex tereticaulis var. typica and Vignea tereticaulis.

== Distribution ==
It is found throughout southern parts of Australia. In Western Australia it is found in coastal areas of the Peel, South West and Great Southern regions where it grows in black peaty-sandy soils. It is often found in grassland, forest or scrubland areas that are seasonally inundated. In South Australia it is found as far west as the southern tip of the Eyre Peninsula with the range extending east to parts of the Fleurieu Peninsula, western parts of the Murray and Mallee, much of the Limestone Coast where it also grows in damp areas that are periodically inundated. It is found in south western and central to northern parts of Victoria but is much less common with only a scattered distribution through south eastern parts. It is often situated in clay soils or in heavy alluvium. In New South Wales its range extends from around Guyra, New South Wales in the Northern Tablelands south through the tablelands and to the south east along the course of the Murray River to around Barham.

== Uses ==
It can be used as an ephemeral batter in wetland areas. Indigenous Australians used the leaves of the plants to make baskets with. Koori women split the thin stems to weave into a spiral pattern to make baskets and capes that was worn to cure toothache.

== See also ==
- List of Carex species
