= Burraboi =

- Town
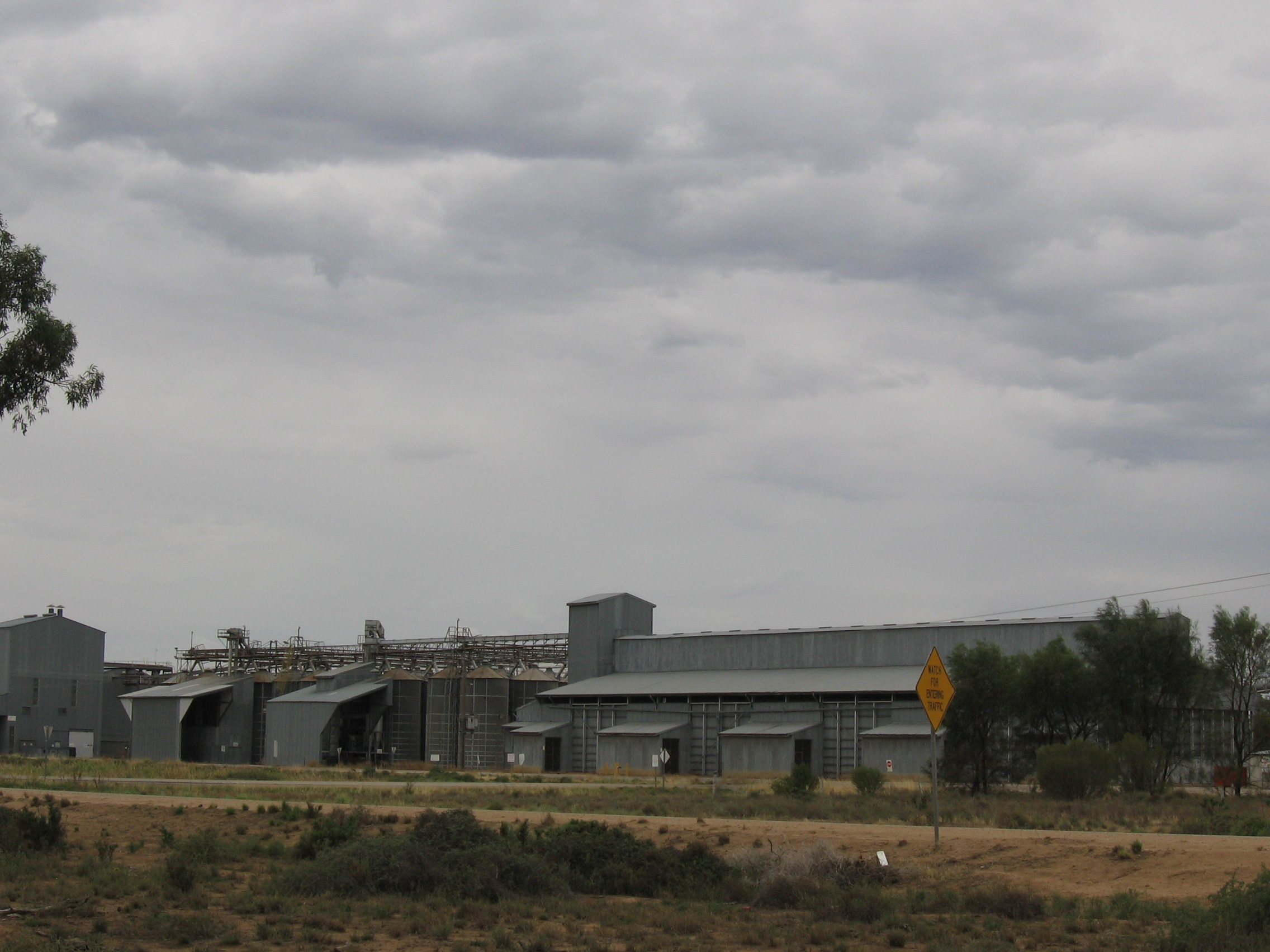
- The largest rice silo complex in the southern hemisphere at Burraboi

- Coordinates: 35°20′S 144°24′E
- Country: Australia
- State: New South Wales
- LGA: Murray River Council
- Location: 808 km (502 mi) from Sydney; 283 km (176 mi) from Albury; 50 km (31 mi) from Moulamein; 34 km (21 mi) from Barham

Government
  - State electorate: Murray
  - Federal division: Farrer

Population
  - Total: 63 (2016 census)
- Postcode: 2732
- County: Wakool

Burraboi is a community in New South Wales, Australia. It is in the southwestern part of the Riverina, about 34 kilometres (21 mi) north of Barham and 50 km south of Moulamein. At the 2016 census, Burraboi had a population of 63.

Burraboi Post Office opened on 1 July 1929 and closed in 1942 (a telephone office remained open until 1957).

Burraboi Public School first began construction in 1954, however in 2010 the school merged with Wakool Public School to create the Wakool Burraboi Public School.

The largest rice silo complex in the southern hemisphere is at Burraboi.

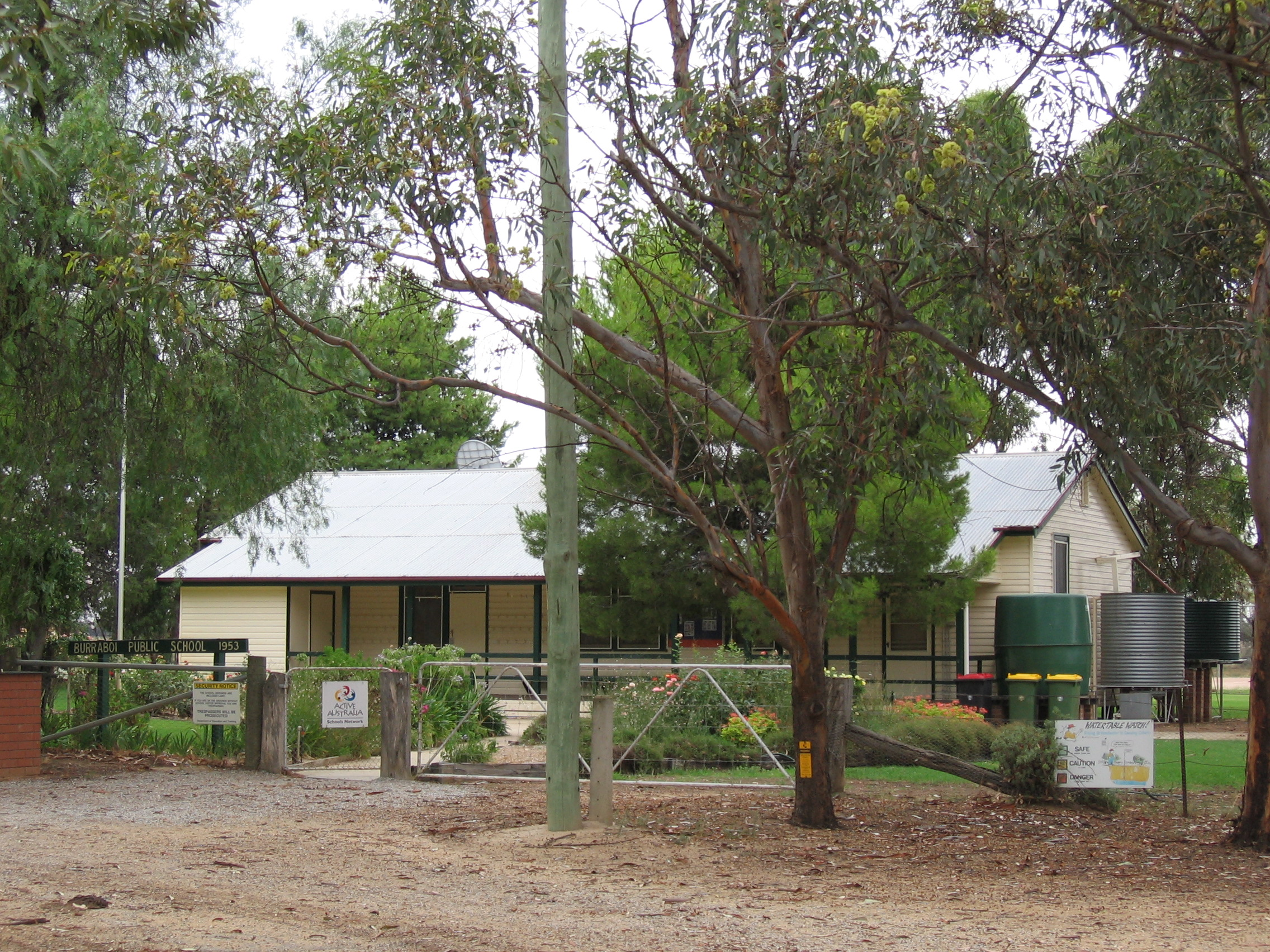
Burraboi Public School
