= Soldier settlement =

Type of settlement in Australia

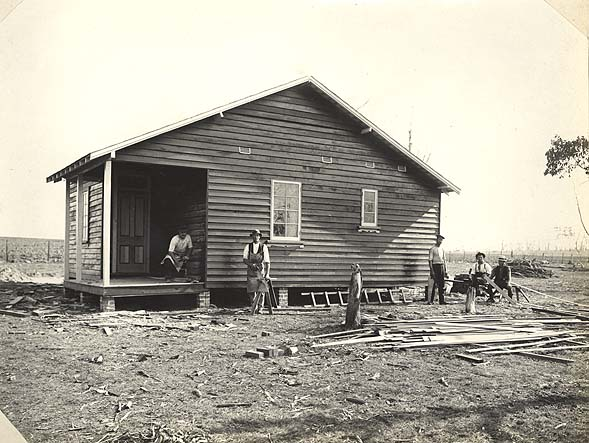
Settler's cottage – Kentucky, New South Wales Soldier Settlement Estate

Soldier settlement was the settlement of land throughout parts of Australia by returning discharged soldiers under soldier settlement schemes administered by state governments after World War I and World War II. The post-World War II settlements were co-ordinated by the Commonwealth Soldier Settlement Commission.

== World War I ==
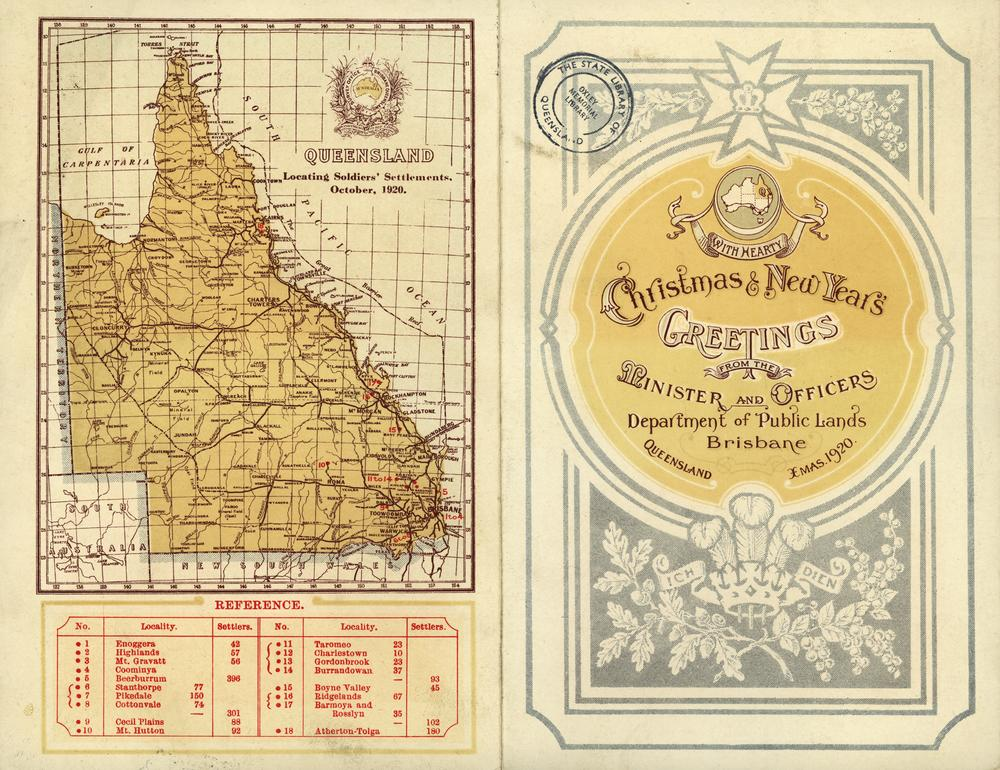
Queensland Soldiers' Settlements, October 1920

Such settlement plans initially began during World War I, with South Australia first enacting legislation in 1915. Similar schemes gained impetus across Australia in February 1916 when a conference of representatives from the Australian Government and all the state governments was held in Melbourne to consider a report prepared by the Federal Parliamentary War Committee regarding the settlement of returned soldiers on the land. The report focused specifically on a federal-state cooperative process of selling or leasing Crown land to soldiers who had been demobilised following the end of their service in this first global conflict. The meeting agreed that it was the Australian Government's role to select and acquire land whilst the State government authorities would process applications and grant land allotments.

Crown land was used where possible, but much land was acquired. By 1924, just over 24 million acres (97,000 km^{2}) had been acquired or allocated. Of this nearly 6.3 million acres (25,000 km^{2}) was purchased and 18 million acres (73,000 km^{2}) was crown land set aside. 23.2 million acres (93,900 km^{2}) had been allotted 23,367 farms across Australia.

Other than supporting soldiers and sailors that were returning from those wars the various governments also saw the opportunity of attracting both Australians and specific groups of allied service personnel to some of the otherwise little inhabited, remote areas of Australia. Although the Australian Government held responsibility for defence, and thus might have taken responsibility for demobilised soldiers, it was the states which took responsibility for land settlement and thus enacted separate soldier settlement schemes. The states also wished to take an active role in recognising the contribution of soldiers.

In addition to soldiers, nurses and female relatives of deceased soldiers were also able to apply for the scheme. However, in cases where women did take on land, they were often given little chance to succeed. Annie Smith, a returned nurse who began a dairy farm in Thorpdale, near Moe was repeatedly criticised by overseers from the Closer Settlement Board for having to hire labour to do some of the more difficult physical tasks. The Board disregarded the fact that the plot she had been assigned had no water, and that Smith often obtained local labour for free, swapping nursing advice for one-off jobs. In 1926 Smith vacated the lot, with no war pension left and mounting debt. Confounding the Board's assumption that her status as a single woman had rendered her unequal to the task, the two subsequent male owners of the property also failed to make the land profitable.

Areas that gained such settlements included:

New South Wales

- Dorrigo
- Griffith
- Tarcutta

Queensland

- Atherton and Tolga
- Barmoya and Rosslyn
- Beerburrum Soldier Settlement
- Burrandowan
- Boyne Valley
- Cecil Plains
- Charlestown
- Coominya Soldier Settlement
- Enoggera
- El Arish
- Gordonbrook
- Highlands
- Mount Gravatt
- Mount Hutton
- Ridgelands
- Stanthorpe / Amiens, Pikedale and Cottonvale
- Taromeo
- Ubobo, where one of the soldier settler's houses is now heritage-listed

South Australia

- Kangaroo Island
- Murray Bridge
- Renmark

Victoria

- Birdwoodton
- Gringegalgona
- Merbein West
- Mortlake
- Numurkah
- Red Cliffs (including the township of Cardross)
- Karadoc/Carwarp/Colignan (including the new towns of Nangiloc and Iraak)

By 30 June 1924 a total of 23,367 returned soldiers and sailors had taken up settlement farms on 23,275,380 acres (94,192 km^{2}) across Australia as per the following breakdown:

State	Scheme commenced	Area allotted	Number of farms
South Australia	1915	2,779,078 acres (11,247 km^{2})	3,240 settlement farms
New South Wales	1916	8,134,009 acres (32,917 km^{2})	6,448 settlement farms
Queensland	1916	705,565 acres (2,855 km^{2})	2000 settlement farms
Tasmania	1916	271,537 acres (1,098 km^{2})	1,935 settlement farms
Victoria	1917	2,290,489 acres (9,269 km^{2})	8,640 settlement farms
Western Australia	1919	9,094,711 acres (36,804 km^{2})	1,095 settlement farms

== World War II ==
The procedure of supporting such soldiers was repeated after World War II with all Australian state governments using the previous and amended forms of such acts of parliament to reinvigorate the programme for this new generation of returned soldiers.

== Rules of holding soldier settlement land ==
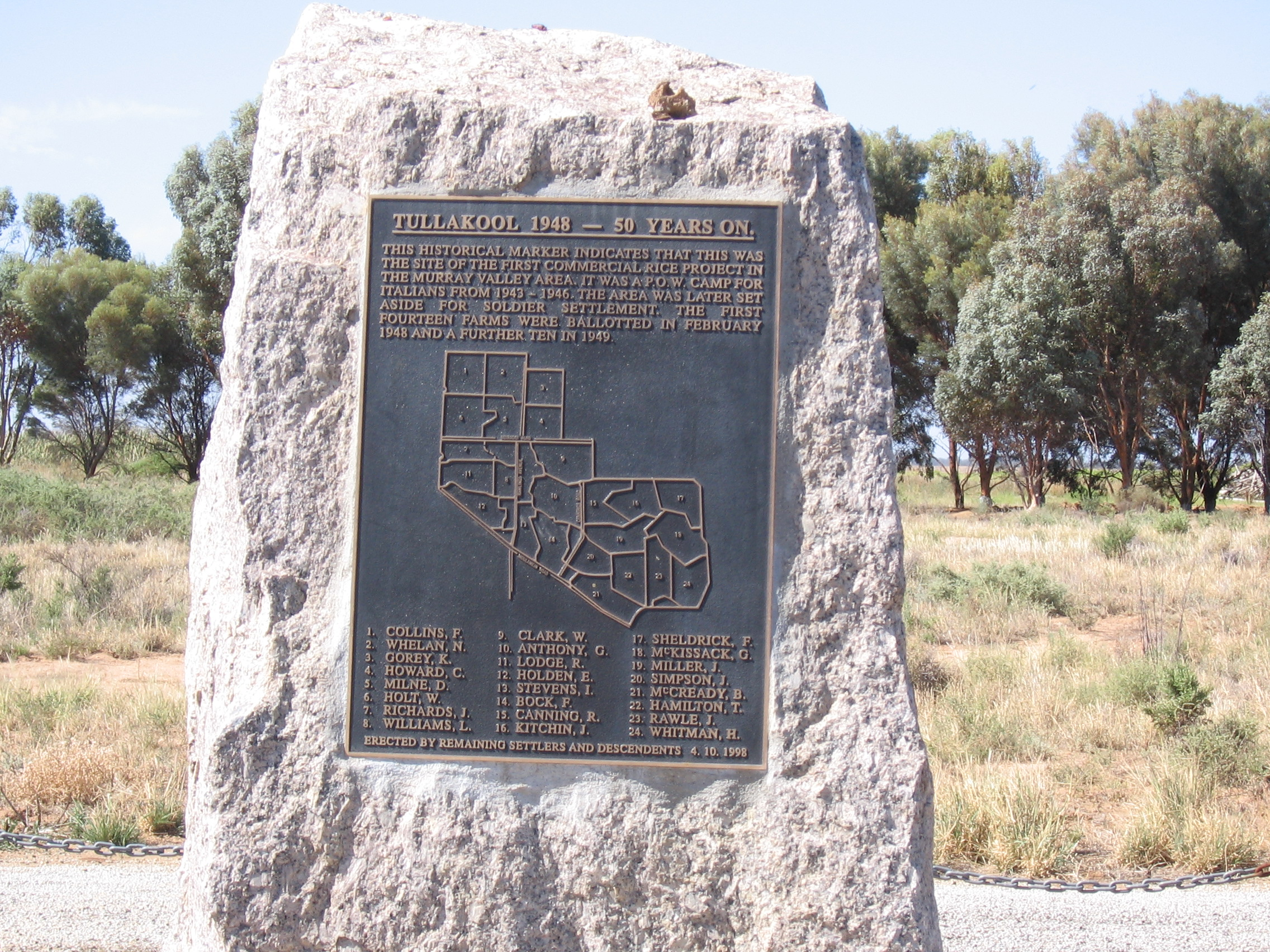
Memorial marking the site of the first commercial rice crop in the Murray Valley at Tullakool, New South Wales

In most cases Crown land, including some land from Aboriginal reserves, was allocated to Australian returning soldiers who in order to buy or lease such a block were required to be certified as qualified and to remain in residence on that land for five years. In this way remote rural areas set aside for such settlement were guaranteed a population expansion which remained to increase infrastructure in the area.

Soldiers who were successful in gaining such a block of land had the opportunity to start a farming life in a number of rural activities including as wool, dairy, cattle, pigs, fruit, fodder and grain. These initial land allotments resulted in triumph for some and despair for others. Indeed, specifically following World War I, in some cases these new farmers, unable to cope with the climatic variances of Australia and lacking the capital to increase stock or quality of life, simply walked off the land back to the large towns and cities from whence they had come.

The success of the program increased after World War II when the infrastructure required for these new farmers was improved as a direct result of learning from the mistakes that came during and after the first attempts at such settlement.

Despite the fact that Aboriginal Australians fought alongside other Australian troops in both World Wars, only a very small number of indigenous applications were successful, including two in Victoria and one in New South Wales. In some cases, land was taken from indigenous Australians, such as at Coranderrk and Cummeragunja Reserve.

== Settlement by state ==
=== South Australia ===
Following World War I, soldiers who had previously worked on irrigation activities along the Murray River during the years leading up to the war returned to find that their previous jobs were no longer available.

The South Australian government responded as early as 1915 with the first of the acts of parliament designed to both repatriate and compensate returning servicemen, and to meet the political and economic need to 'sponsor' the development of intensively productive agriculture pursuits. Soldiers were informed of the availability of the scheme via the media and in the material provided in both recruitment packages and general information forwarded to men serving overseas.

Settlement schemes during and after the conclusion of World War I saw properties specialising in dairy, grapes, vegetables, grains, and grazing develop along the River in Cobdogla, Waikerie, Berri, Cadell, Chaffey and near Renmark.

Following a number of acts that dealt with Soldier Settlement the South Australian government introduced the Discharged Soldier Settlement Act 1934 which consolidated acts such as the Crown Lands Act 1929 and the Irrigation Act 1930 for the benefit of any discharged soldier who had served in connection with the Great War and had been a member of the British Army or Navy or of the Australian Imperial Force or of any other naval or military force raised in any part of the British Empire for service in that War, or to the widow (who had children) of any such who had died or dies from wounds inflicted, accident occurring, or disease contracted whilst on service. A training farm was established at Pompoota to teach soldiers the skills they would need to be successful as farmers. The training farm was an initiative of Samuel McIntosh who had observed the Village Settlements twenty years earlier in which unemployed city people were provided with land and expected to be able to clear and farm it with no relevant experience in farming.

Settlement schemes after World War II expanded to include the Loxton Irrigation Area, which became the largest such scheme in South Australia, and to another part of the previously developed area of Chaffey. The Returned Services League (RSL) lobbied the state government to open up more land for returned soldiers at Loxton, and returning soldiers were informed of the scheme at the RSL through handout material. Settlement schemes after World War II also led to the establishment of the new towns of Parndana on Kangaroo Island and Padthway in the south east of the state.

However whilst the first world war settlers had achieved only a modicum of success the benefit of that previous experience helped the second world war veterans, particularly in Loxton, to avoid some past mistakes and with the assistance of the Department of Lands, the community worked together in order to survive and prosper. Irrigation schemes that eventually arrived saw the advent of the productive orchard and vineyard concerns that became so important to the overall region as it exists today.

=== New South Wales ===
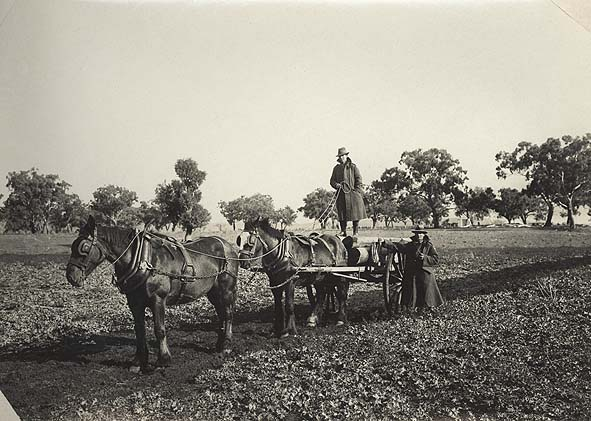
Carting posts at Oban, New South Wales Soldiers Settlement

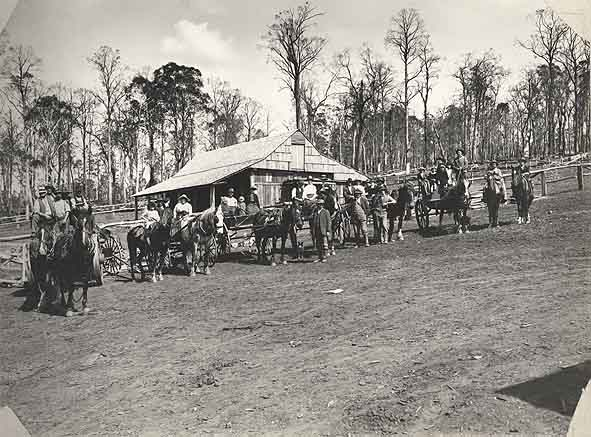
Batlow Soldier's Settlement Estate – settlers and their families

The State Government of New South Wales introduced the Returned Soldiers Settlement Act 1916 shortly after the combined Australian and State meeting held in Melbourne earlier that year (see above). Soldiers who had served outside of Australia either as a part of the Australian Imperial Forces or as a part of the British Defence Service and who had been honourably discharged were eligible to apply for Crown Lands. This was land that the New South Wales Government had acquired under either the Closer Settlement Acts, Murrumbidgee Irrigation Act 1910, or was available as a part of general disposal under the Crown Lands Consolidation Act 1913.

Ex-servicemen were required to apply for such land via completion of appropriate paperwork and if successful a soldier could gain additional financial assistance for the purpose of clearing, fencing, drainage, water supply and other improvement of the land as well as for the erection of buildings and the purchase of stock, seeds, implements, plants and similar material necessary for the occupation and development of the land.

By 1917 the state government saw fit to enact the Returned Soldiers Settlement (Amendment) Act 1917, which broadened the definition of returned soldiers to include those who had not enlisted in Australia and those who had not served overseas, as well as providing for potential further categories of soldiers.

In the period October 1917 – June 1920?, twelve soldier settlement projects were commenced. Projects areas included Bankstown and Seven Hills in the outer metropolitan area and rural Glen Innes, Hillston, and Batlow. Industries commenced included poultry, horticulture, pig, fruit, and market gardening. The pastoral property Dirnaseer was subdivided for soldier-settlement in 1919.

New South Wales also repeated the process following World War II with settlements commencing in areas including Dareton.

=== Victoria ===
The Discharged Soldiers' Settlement Act 1917 established a scheme. Between 1918 and 1934, 11,639 returned servicemen were allocated blocks under this soldier settlement scheme. Most settled in the Mallee (both on dryland and irrigated properties), South Gippsland, the Western District, Central Gippsland near Maffra and Sale and in the Goulburn Valley.

During the 1920s soldier settlers struggled and of those allocated blocks under the scheme, only sixty-one per cent were on blocks in 1934. By 1939 60% had left their blocks. The scheme was criticised by a Victorian Royal Commission in 1925 and a later Australian Government inquiry. The royal commission identified four main reasons for the failure of soldier settlers:

- The selection of inexperienced settlers
- Lack of capital
- The size of blocks allocated
- Prices received for agricultural products.

It was also claimed that returned soldiers were allocated blocks of land without having established their ability to manage a farm.

The soldier settler scheme in Red Cliffs, Victoria was very successful.

Numurkah became the headquarters of the Murray Valley Soldier Settlement Area – one of the largest soldier settlements in Australia.

After World War II, the Soldier Settlement Scheme was refined in the light of past failures. Blocks were bigger, were more carefully selected and roads, housing and fences were supplied to prospective settlers.

The Heytesbury Settlement Scheme was one of the last large scale soldier settlement schemes in Victoria.

=== Western Australia ===
In Western Australia, the War Service Land Settlement Scheme settled hundreds of soldiers, in the Wheatbelt and south west region. Initially, fully and partially developed farms were bought, improved and subdivided by the government, then sold to returned soldiers. Loans were also offered.

In 1949, the price of land rose sharply, so the government began to develop virgin Crown land in the south of the state.

In 1957 a royal commission was conducted into the scheme.

By 1958, demand for land by ex-servicemen had declined, but the scheme had been so successful that the government was reluctant to end it, so it instead opened it up to all civilians. This continued until 1969, when a wheat glut forced the government to impose quotas on wheat planting.

== See also ==
- War Service Homes Scheme, Australian federal housing scheme for returned soldiers
- Homestead Act, United States legislation with many of the same effects after the end of the American Civil War
- G.I. Bill, United States legislation with the same aim of assisting World War II veterans
- Roman legion § Pay
