= Wakool Shire =

Former local government area in New South Wales, Australia

Shire of Wakool
- Local government area
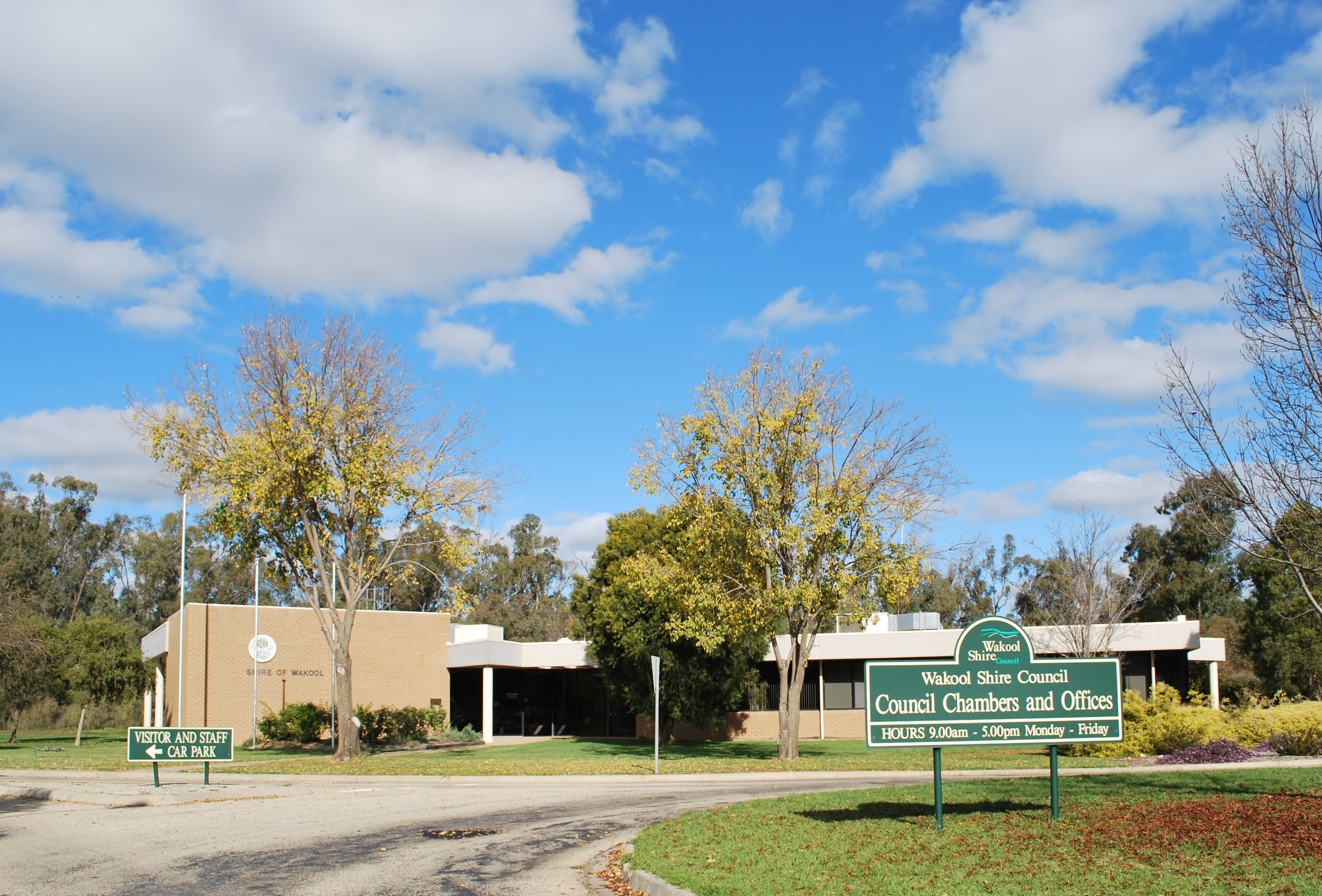
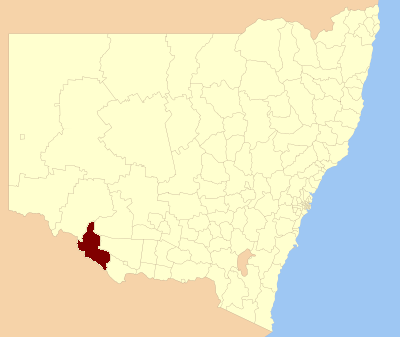
- Council chambers at Moulamein Location in New South Wales
- Coordinates: 35°05′S 144°02′E
- Country: Australia
- State: New South Wales
- Region: Riverina
- Established: 12 June 1907
- Abolished: 12 May 2016
- Council seat: Moulamein

Government
  - Mayor: Neil Gorey (unaligned)
  - State electorate: Murray
  - Federal division: Farrer

Area
  - Total: 7,521 km^{2} (2,904 sq mi)

Population
  - Total: 4,033 (2012)
  - Density: 0.53623/km^{2} (1.38883/sq mi)
- Website: Shire of Wakool
LGAs around Shire of Wakool
Balranald	Hay	Conargo
Swan Hill (Vic)	Shire of Wakool	Conargo
Swan Hill (Vic)	Gannawarra (Vic)	Murray

Wakool Shire was a local government area in the Riverina region of New South Wales, Australia. The Shire was located between the Murray River and the Murrumbidgee River and adjacent to the Sturt Highway. Towns in the Shire are Barham, Moulamein, Tooleybuc, Wakool and Koraleigh.

The last mayor of Wakool Shire was Clr. Neil Gorey, an unaligned politician.

== Amalgamation ==
A 2015 review of local government boundaries by the NSW Government Independent Pricing and Regulatory Tribunal recommended that the Wakool Shire merge with the Murray Shire to form a new council with an area of 11,865 square kilometres (4,581 sq mi) and support a population of approximately 11,500.

Wakool Shire was abolished on 12 May 2016 and along with neighbouring Murray Shire, the area was included in the Murray River Council local government area.

== Council ==
=== Composition and election method ===
At the time of dissolution, Wakool Shire Council was composed of six councillors elected proportionally as three separate wards, each electing two councillors. All councillors were elected for a fixed four-year term of office. The mayor was elected by the councillors at the first meeting of the council. The most recent election was held on 8 September 2012. In the B and C Wards, only two candidates, being those below, nominated for election. There being no additional candidates, the election for these wards was uncontested. In the A Ward, an election was held. The makeup of the council is as follows:

Party	Councillors
Independents and Unaligned	6
Total	6

The current Council, elected in 2012, in order of election, is:

Ward	Councillor	Party	Notes
A Ward	Lois Lockhart	Unaligned	
A Ward	Anne Crowe	Independent	
B Ward	Anthony Jackson	Unaligned	
B Ward	Katarni Lipp	Unaligned	
C Ward	Neil Gorey	Unaligned	
C Ward	Colin Membrey	Unaligned	
