= Karadoc Solar Farm =

- Country: Australia
- Location: Iraak
- Coordinates: 34°25′S 142°16′E
- Status: Operational
- Commission date: November 2018
- Owner: BayWa

Solar farm
- Type: Standard PV
- Site area: 664 acres (269 ha)

Power generation
- Nameplate capacity: 90 MW

Karadoc Solar Farm is a photovoltaic power station 35 kilometres (22 mi) south of Mildura near the town of Iraak in Victoria, Australia. It can generate up to 112MW of electricity, and was designed by BayWa r.e. Solar. It was officially opened in March 2019.

The solar farm is on a site of 269 hectares (664 acres) and was built by Beon Energy Solutions with first generation in November 2018. It has an offtake agreement to provide 74,000 MWh per year of electricity to Carlton & United Breweries for 12 years. At the time of its construction, it was the largest in Victoria at 90 MW_{AC}, 112 MW_{P}.

In August 2023 it was sold to Igneo Infrastructure Partners.
