= Nangiloc =

- Town
- Coordinates: 34°28′0″S 142°21′0″E
- Country: Australia
- State: Victoria
- LGA: Rural City of Mildura
- Location: 516 km (321 mi) NW of Melbourne; 46 km (29 mi) SE of Mildura; 30 km (19 mi) SE of Red Cliffs

Government
  - State electorate: Mildura
  - Federal division: Mallee

Population
  - Total: 153 (2021 census)
- Postcode: 3494
Localities around Nangiloc
Carwarp	Iraak	New South Wales
Carwarp	Nangiloc	New South Wales
Carwarp	Colignan	New South Wales

Nangiloc locality in the Rural City of Mildura, Victoria, Australia. It is located on the south bank of the Murray River, about 50 km south east of Mildura. Primarily an agricultural settlement, at the 2021 census, Nangiloc and the surrounding area had a population of 153.

Nangiloc and nearby localities Iraak and Colignan were established as soldier settlement farming areas after World War I, road access to the area being from the west via Boonoonar on what is now the Calder Highway. The Post Office opened on 22 September 1922, the same day as that of Iraak, and closed in 1960.

Irrigation from the Murray and rich local soil has allowed for diverse crops. The area has become increasingly well known for its gourmet wines and fresh fruit industries. Also many niche agricultural goods are produced in this area. Crops like avocado, pistachio and almonds are well established.

The area is also well known as a camping destination. There are many bush reserves along the banks of the Murray river that showcase the Mallee bush and its subtle beauty.

Nangiloc has an Australian Rules football team competing in the Millewa Football League.

Next to Nangiloc is the town Colignan. The two towns' names are spelt the same only backwards. It appears that Colignan predated Nangiloc, and Colignan is thought to have been the name of a local Aboriginal leader.

== See also ==
- 1956 Murray River flood
