= Colignan =

- Town
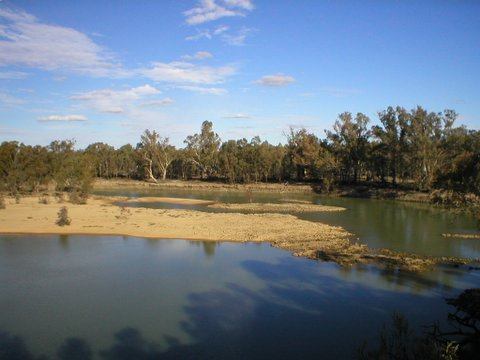
- The Murray River flows through Colignan. This island, commonly known as Watts's or Colignan Island, is fully submerged when the river is high

- Coordinates: 34°33′S 142°23′E
- Country: Australia
- State: Victoria
- LGA: Rural City of Mildura
- Location: 509 km (316 mi) NW of Melbourne; 53 km (33 mi) SE of Mildura; 10 km (6.2 mi) S of Nangiloc

Government
  - State electorate: Mildura
  - Federal division: Mallee

Population
  - Total: 305 (2021 census)
- Postcode: 3494
Localities around Colignan
Nangiloc	Nangiloc	New South Wales
Carwarp	Colignan	New South Wales
Carwarp	Hattah	Hattah

Colignan is a town on the banks of the Murray River, in North Western Victoria, Australia. The town is on the border of the Hattah-Kulkyne National Park. At the 2016 census, Colignan and the surrounding area had a population of 329.

The closest town to Colignan is called Nangiloc which is Colignan spelt in reverse. It appears that Colignan predated Nangiloc, and Colignan is thought to have been the name of a local Aboriginal leader.

== History ==
Colignan and nearby localities Nangiloc and Iraak were established as soldier settlement farming areas after World War I, road access to the area being from the west via Boonoonar on what is now the Calder Highway. A Post Office opened on August 22, 1922, marking the beginning of postal services to the area. It closed in 1988.

In common with many other soldier settlement areas the blocks provided were too small to be viable and most original settlers had left by the mid-1930s and were replaced by a later generation using irrigation.

== Present day ==
The economy of the town is based on primary industry, mostly citrus and grape growing. Avocados and almonds are also well represented. The rich soil and the proximity to the Murray River have allowed farming of a diverse range of crops. Dry land farming in the area consists of mainly wheat and barley.

== See also ==
- 1956 Murray River flood
