= 1956 Murray River flood =

Severe weather event in Australia

The 1956 Murray River flood involved the rising of waters in the Murray River and flooding of many towns in New South Wales, Victoria and South Australia. The flood was and still is considered the biggest flood in the recorded history of the Murray and described as "the greatest catastrophe in South Australia's history", although few lives were lost.

The flood occurred due to higher than average rainfalls in Western Queensland and heavy rains in the proceeding three months in the Murray-Darling basin. Flood waters moved down the Murray and Darling rivers for seven months and peaked between 11 and 14 August at Merbein in Victoria and 12.3 metres (40 ft) at Morgan in South Australia. Inflow into South Australia peaked at 341 gigalitres per day, the highest on record; the next highest on record is 220 gigalitres per day in 1931.

From upstream to downstream, flooding occurred in the towns of Wentworth in New South Wales; Colignan, Iraak, Mildura, Nangiloc, and Red Cliffs in Victoria; and many South Australia towns including Renmark, Mannum and Murray Bridge. Some areas were flooded up to 100 kilometres (62 mi) from the natural flow of the river.

As a result of the flood, the Menindee Lakes were constructed to store high flows from the Darling River.

== Impact ==
=== Mildura, Victoria ===
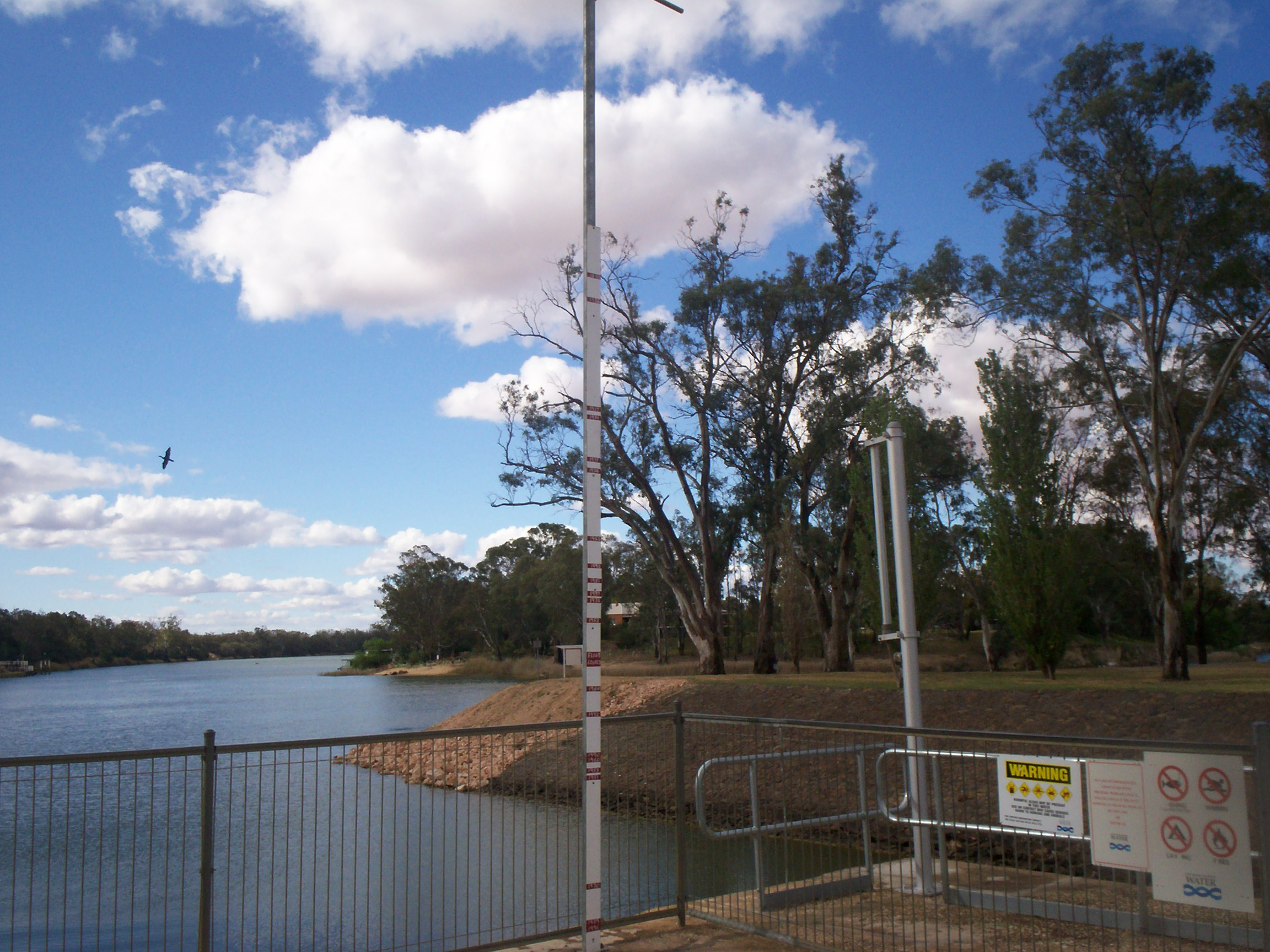
Flood markers at Lock 11, Mildura. The second red marking from the top is where the river reached in 1956.

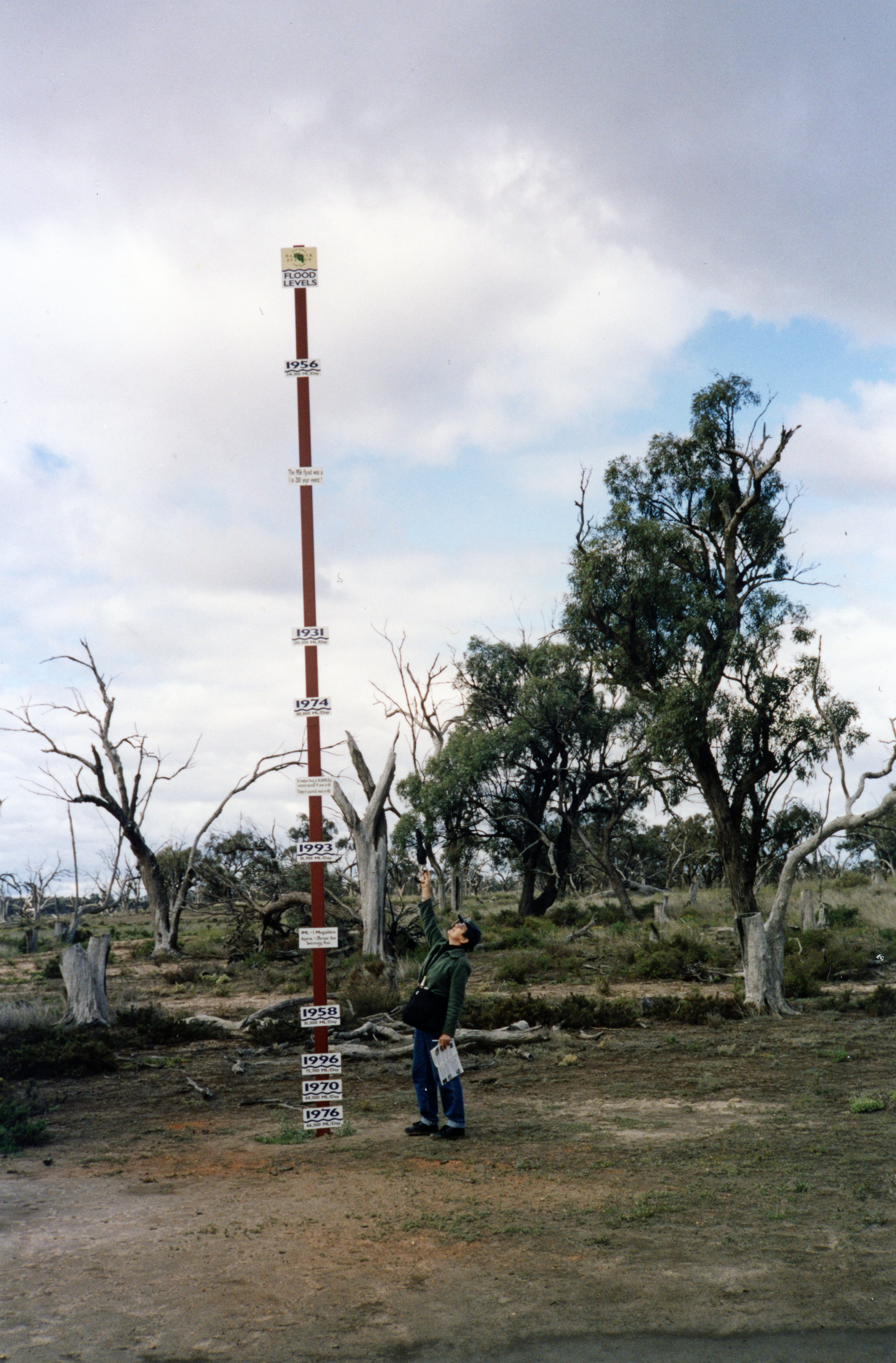
Marker at Banrock Station

In 2006, historic flood markers were erected at Apex Park and the lawns of the Mildura Rowing Club at Mildura, indicating the height the river reached in 1956. Additional markers were to be erected at various locations along the river from Wentworth to Colignan.

=== Wentworth, New South Wales ===
The town of Wentworth, located on the junction of the Darling and Murray Rivers, erected a statue in 1959 in honour of the Fergie TE20 tractor, responsible for helping to erect a levee around the town which kept floodwaters at bay for months. A tractor rally is also held every five years to celebrate the Fergie.

=== Mannum, South Australia ===
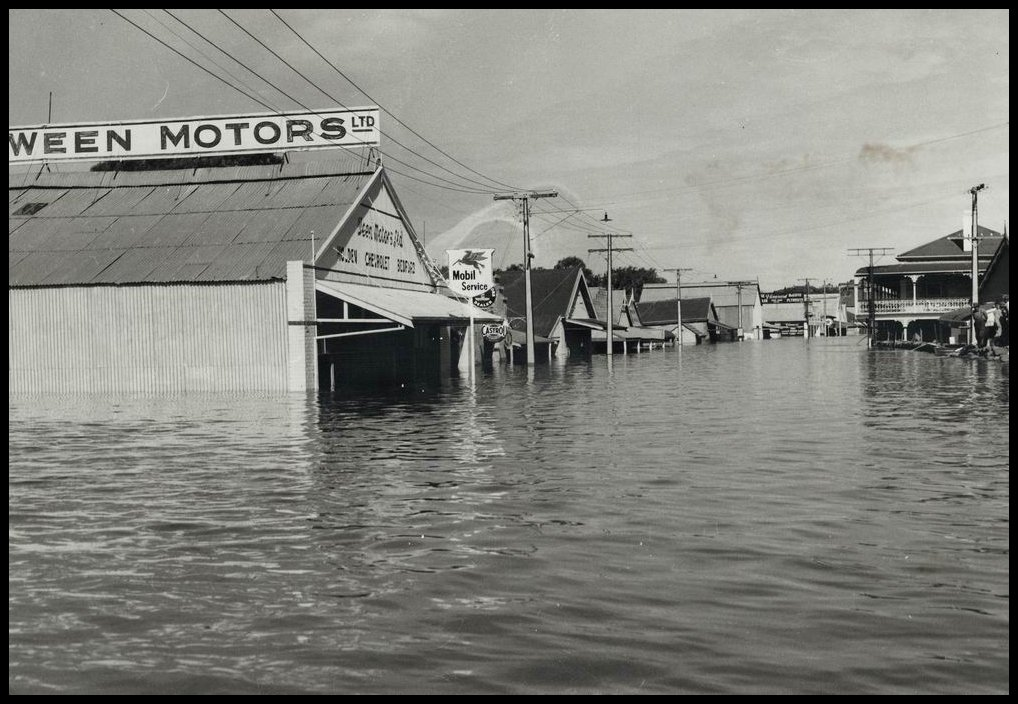
1956 flood in Mannum

Hotels in the main street of Mannum operated their bars from the second floor with boats tying up to the balcony. The flood water broke the levee bank on 24 August, and had not fully receded until Christmas.

Several towns in South Australia have depth markers showing how high the floodwaters rose.

== In popular culture ==
Author Philip Pullman used his childhood memories of being taken to see the flood as a basis for his 2017 fantasy novel La Belle Sauvage.
