= Perekerten, New South Wales =

Perekerten New South Wales
- Coordinates: 34°55′35″S 143°50′31″E
- Postcode(s): 2733
- Elevation: 71 m (233 ft)
- Location: 31 km (19 mi) from Moulamein; 42 km (26 mi) from Balranald
- LGA(s): Murray River Shire
- County: Wakool
- State electorate(s): Murray
- Federal division(s): Farrer

Perekerten is a rural locality in the western part of the Riverina. It is situated by rail, about 31 kilometres north west of Moulamein and 42 kilometres south east of Balranald.

Perekerten is the site of a railway station serviced by Victorian Railways.
