= Iraak =

- Coordinates: 34°25′0″S 142°19′0″E
- Country: Australia
- State: Victoria
- LGA: Rural City of Mildura
- Location: 524 km (326 mi) from Melbourne; 35 km (22 mi) from Mildura; 12 km (7.5 mi) from Nangiloc; 82 km (51 mi) from Ouyen

Government
  - State electorate: Mildura
  - Federal division: Mallee

Population
  - Total: 118 (2021 census)
- Postcode: 3494
Localities around Iraak
Carwarp	Red Cliffs	New South Wales
Carwarp	Iraak	New South Wales
Carwarp	Nangiloc	New South Wales

Iraak is a locality in Victoria, Australia, located approximately 35 km south-east of Mildura, Victoria.

Iraak and nearby localities Nangiloc and Colignan were established as soldier settlement farming areas after World War I, road access to the area being from the west via Boonoonar on what is now the Calder Highway. The Post Office opened on 22 September 1922 the same day as that of Nangiloc, closing in 1960.

The Karadoc Solar Farm opened in the locality of Iraak in late 2018.

== See also ==
- 1956 Murray River flood
