= Wakool County =

Wakool New South Wales
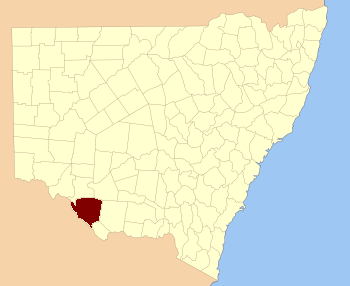
- Location in New South Wales
Lands administrative divisions around Wakool:
Caira	Caira	Waradgery
Tatchera (Vic)	Wakool	Townsend
Tatchera (Vic)	Gunbower (Vic)	Cadell

Wakool County is one of the 141 cadastral divisions of New South Wales. The main geographic feature of the county is the Wakool River. The county contains the towns of Barham, Moulamein, Wakool and Kyalite.

The name Wakool is believed to be derived from a local Aboriginal word.

== Parishes within this county ==
A full list of parishes found within this county; their current LGA and mapping coordinates to the approximate centre of each location is as follows:

Parish	LGA	Coordinates
Baldon	Edward River Council	34°55′54″S 144°09′04″E
Balpool	Council of the Shire of Wakool	35°13′54″S 144°22′04″E
Barham	Council of the Shire of Wakool	35°36′54″S 144°09′04″E
Barrabu	Council of the Shire of Wakool	35°11′54″S 144°16′04″E
Belmore	Council of the Shire of Wakool	35°24′54″S 144°00′04″E
Benjee	Council of the Shire of Wakool	35°03′54″S 144°08′04″E
Berambong	Council of the Shire of Wakool	35°01′54″S 143°57′04″E
Beremegad	Council of the Shire of Wakool	35°25′54″S 144°09′04″E
Binbinette	Council of the Shire of Wakool	34°59′54″S 143°53′04″E
Bookit	Council of the Shire of Wakool	35°29′54″S 144°19′04″E
Boyd	Council of the Shire of Wakool	35°13′54″S 144°05′04″E
Bundyulumblah	Edward River Council	35°01′54″S 144°31′04″E
Bungunyah	Council of the Shire of Wakool	35°09′54″S 143°25′04″E
Burbagadah	Council of the Shire of Wakool	35°07′54″S 144°08′04″E
Burrawang	Council of the Shire of Wakool	34°59′54″S 143°39′04″E
Bymue	Council of the Shire of Wakool	35°05′54″S 143°24′04″E
Cangan	Council of the Shire of Wakool	35°41′54″S 144°18′04″E
Caroonboon	Edward River Council	34°55′54″S 144°20′04″E
Chowar	Council of the Shire of Wakool	35°20′54″S 144°21′04″E
Cobwell	Council of the Shire of Wakool	35°29′54″S 144°07′04″E
Cockran	Council of the Shire of Wakool	35°21′54″S 144°27′04″E
Colvin	Council of the Shire of Wakool	35°02′54″S 144°19′04″E
Condoulpe	Council of the Shire of Wakool	34°49′54″S 143°38′04″E
Coobool	Council of the Shire of Wakool	35°10′54″S 143°45′04″E
Coonamit	Council of the Shire of Wakool	35°10′54″S 143°39′04″E
Cootnite	Edward River Council	35°10′54″S 144°31′04″E
Corry	Council of the Shire of Wakool	35°29′54″S 144°23′04″E
Cunninyeuk	Council of the Shire of Wakool	35°16′54″S 143°54′04″E
Currpool	Council of the Shire of Wakool	35°15′54″S 143°38′04″E
Danberry	Council of the Shire of Wakool	35°35′54″S 144°15′04″E
Darlot	Council of the Shire of Wakool	35°00′54″S 144°25′04″E
Firebrace	Edward River Council	34°55′54″S 144°30′04″E
Genoe	Council of the Shire of Wakool	35°03′54″S 143°30′04″E
Gerabbit	Council of the Shire of Wakool	35°06′54″S 144°18′04″E
Gnuie	Council of the Shire of Wakool	35°26′54″S 143°54′04″E
Gonn	Council of the Shire of Wakool	35°29′54″S 144°00′04″E
Gwynne	Edward River Council	34°51′54″S 144°11′04″E
Gynong	Council of the Shire of Wakool	35°20′54″S 144°16′04″E
Hindmarsh	Council of the Shire of Wakool	35°05′54″S 144°02′04″E
Jimaringle	Council of the Shire of Wakool	35°19′54″S 144°11′04″E
Kerkeri	Council of the Shire of Wakool	34°48′54″S 143°56′04″E
Kirrabirri	Edward River Council	35°06′54″S 144°31′04″E
Kyalite	Council of the Shire of Wakool	34°55′54″S 143°33′04″E
Landale	Council of the Shire of Wakool	35°02′54″S 144°00′04″E
Liewa	Council of the Shire of Wakool	34°59′54″S 143°30′04″E
Lintot	Council of the Shire of Wakool	34°49′54″S 143°44′04″E
Lyle	Council of the Shire of Wakool	34°59′54″S 144°00′04″E
Mallan	Council of the Shire of Wakool	35°03′54″S 143°45′04″E
Mallee	Council of the Shire of Wakool	34°54′54″S 143°23′04″E
Mein	Council of the Shire of Wakool	34°54′54″S 143°57′04″E
Mellool	Council of the Shire of Wakool	35°23′54″S 143°49′04″E
Merran	Council of the Shire of Wakool	35°15′54″S 143°44′04″E
Merwin	Council of the Shire of Wakool	34°48′54″S 143°50′04″E
Mia Mia	Council of the Shire of Wakool	35°33′54″S 144°17′04″E
Milleu	Council of the Shire of Wakool	34°57′54″S 143°22′04″E
Miranda	Edward River Council	34°51′54″S 144°30′04″E
Moolpa	Council of the Shire of Wakool	34°59′54″S 143°34′04″E
Moorongatta	Council of the Shire of Wakool	35°22′54″S 143°54′04″E
Moulamein South	Council of the Shire of Wakool	35°09′54″S 144°02′04″E
Moulamein	Council of the Shire of Wakool	35°02′54″S 144°03′04″E
Murga	Council of the Shire of Wakool	35°10′54″S 144°24′04″E
Nearroongaroo	Council of the Shire of Wakool	35°16′54″S 144°00′04″E
Niemur	Council of the Shire of Wakool	35°04′54″S 143°51′04″E
Noorong	Council of the Shire of Wakool	35°20′54″S 143°58′04″E
Nullum	Council of the Shire of Wakool	35°07′54″S 144°20′04″E
Nunnagoyt	Council of the Shire of Wakool	35°31′54″S 144°05′04″E
Nyang	Council of the Shire of Wakool	35°10′54″S 144°11′04″E
Parquin	Council of the Shire of Wakool	35°00′54″S 144°03′04″E
Perekerten	Council of the Shire of Wakool	34°54′54″S 143°51′04″E
Pevensey	Edward River Council	34°49′54″S 144°19′04″E
Poon Boon	Council of the Shire of Wakool	35°05′54″S 143°34′04″E
Puah	Council of the Shire of Wakool	35°09′54″S 143°30′04″E
Raubelle	Edward River Council	34°55′54″S 144°16′04″E
Salisbury	Council of the Shire of Wakool	34°53′54″S 143°45′04″E
Speewa	Council of the Shire of Wakool	35°09′54″S 143°34′04″E
Tchelery	Edward River Council	34°44′54″S 144°09′04″E
Thalaka	Edward River Council	34°51′54″S 144°18′04″E
Tittil	Council of the Shire of Wakool	35°39′54″S 144°14′04″E
Tooleybuc	Council of the Shire of Wakool	35°01′54″S 143°24′04″E
Toolmah	Council of the Shire of Wakool	35°18′54″S 143°50′04″E
Toolon	Council of the Shire of Wakool	35°29′54″S 144°14′04″E
Towweruk	Council of the Shire of Wakool	35°14′54″S 143°54′04″E
Turora	Council of the Shire of Wakool	34°50′54″S 143°33′04″E
Wakool	Council of the Shire of Wakool	34°58′54″S 143°27′04″E
Wandaradget	Council of the Shire of Wakool	35°17′54″S 144°05′04″E
Wetuppa	Council of the Shire of Wakool	35°14′54″S 143°51′04″E
Whymoul	Council of the Shire of Wakool	35°32′54″S 144°11′04″E
Willakool	Council of the Shire of Wakool	35°20′54″S 143°43′04″E
Windouran	Council of the Shire of Wakool	35°02′54″S 144°14′04″E
Winter	Council of the Shire of Wakool	34°51′54″S 143°59′04″E
Wood	Council of the Shire of Wakool	34°54′54″S 144°03′04″E
Woorooma	Council of the Shire of Wakool	35°05′54″S 144°12′04″E
Worobyan	Council of the Shire of Wakool	35°06′54″S 143°56′04″E
Yadabal	Council of the Shire of Wakool	35°16′54″S 144°27′04″E
Yadchow	Council of the Shire of Wakool	35°04′54″S 143°41′04″E
Yanga	Council of the Shire of Wakool	34°44′54″S 144°08′04″E
Yarrein	Council of the Shire of Wakool	35°01′54″S 143°37′04″E
Yellymong	Council of the Shire of Wakool	35°18′54″S 143°37′04″E
