= Carwarp =

- Town
- Coordinates: 34.467°S 142.20°E
- Country: Australia
- State: Victoria
- LGA: Rural City of Mildura
- Location: 514 km (319 mi) from Melbourne; 36 km (22 mi) from Mildura; 72 km (45 mi) from Ouyen; 19 km (12 mi) from Red Cliffs

Government
  - State electorate: Mildura
  - Federal division: Mallee

Population
  - Total: 68 (2021 census)
- Postcode: 3494
Localities around Carwarp
Koorlong	Red Cliffs	Iraak
Merrinee	Carwarp	Nangiloc
Murray-Sunset	Hattah	Colignan

Carwarp is a locality in Victoria, Australia, approximately 36 km from Mildura, Victoria. Carwarp was the home town of Percy Stewart, a founding member of the Victorian Farmers Union, from which the Country Party (now National Party of Australia) emerged. Stewart served in both the Victorian Legislative Assembly, where he represented the electoral district of Mildura, and in the federal parliament for the Australian House of Representatives electorate of Wimmera. Another parliamentarian from Carwarp was Albert Allnutt, who represented the electoral district of Mildura in the Victorian Legislative Assembly from 1927 until 1945.

Carwarp is the location for the Mildura Solar Concentrator Power Station, with other solar power plants nearby.

The Post Office opened on 17 November 1913 and closed in 1992.
