= Barham, New South Wales =

Barham
- Town
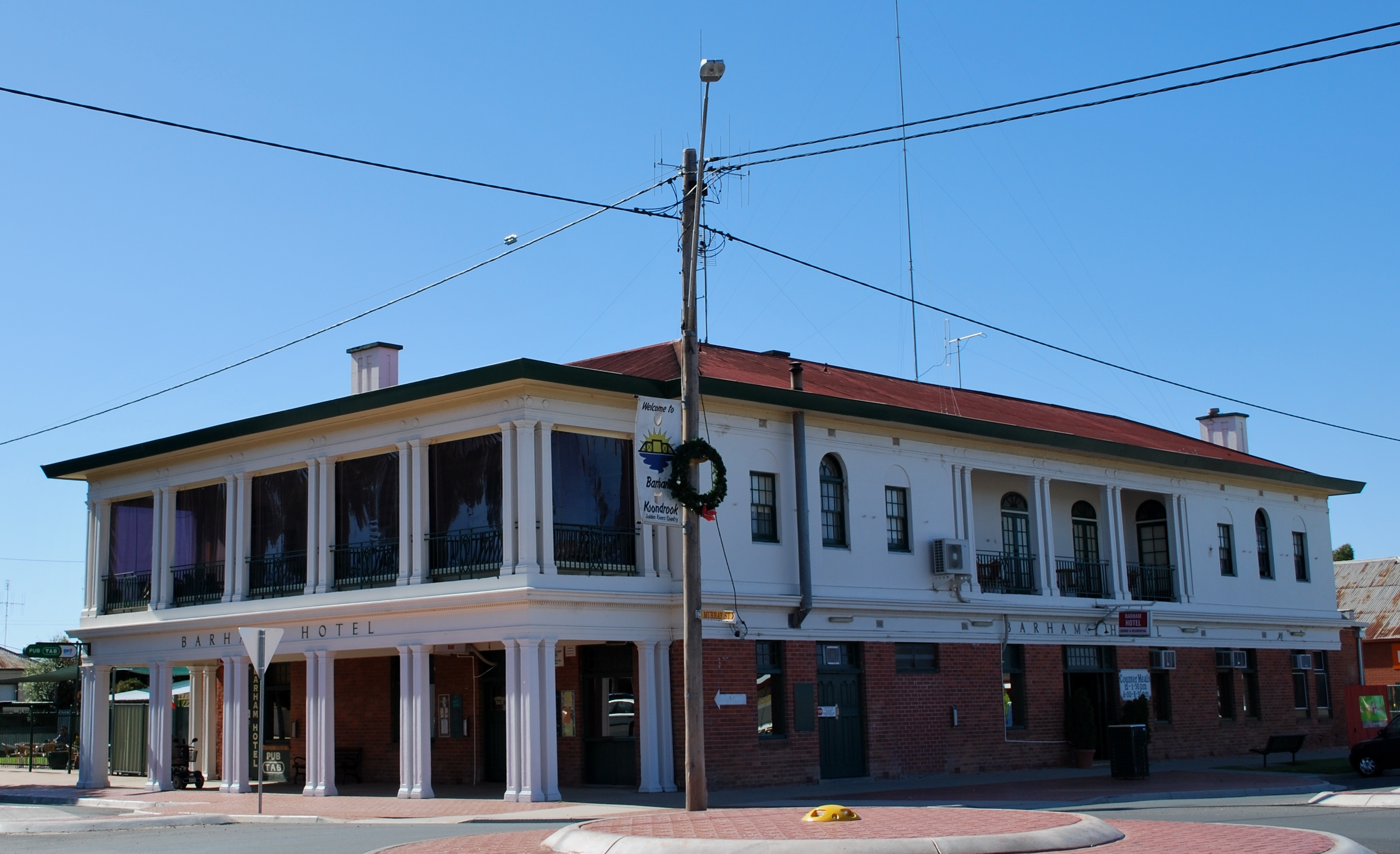
- The Barham Hotel

- Coordinates: 35.6268005°S 144.1280514°E
- Country: Australia
- State: New South Wales
- LGA: Murray River Council
- Location: 826 km (513 mi) from Sydney; 338 km (210 mi) from Griffith; 71 km (44 mi) from Moulamein; 2 km (1.2 mi) from Koondrook

Government
  - State electorate: Murray
  - Federal division: Farrer
- Elevation: 73 m (240 ft)

Population
  - Total: 1,134 (UCL 2021)
- Postcode: 2732
- County: Wakool

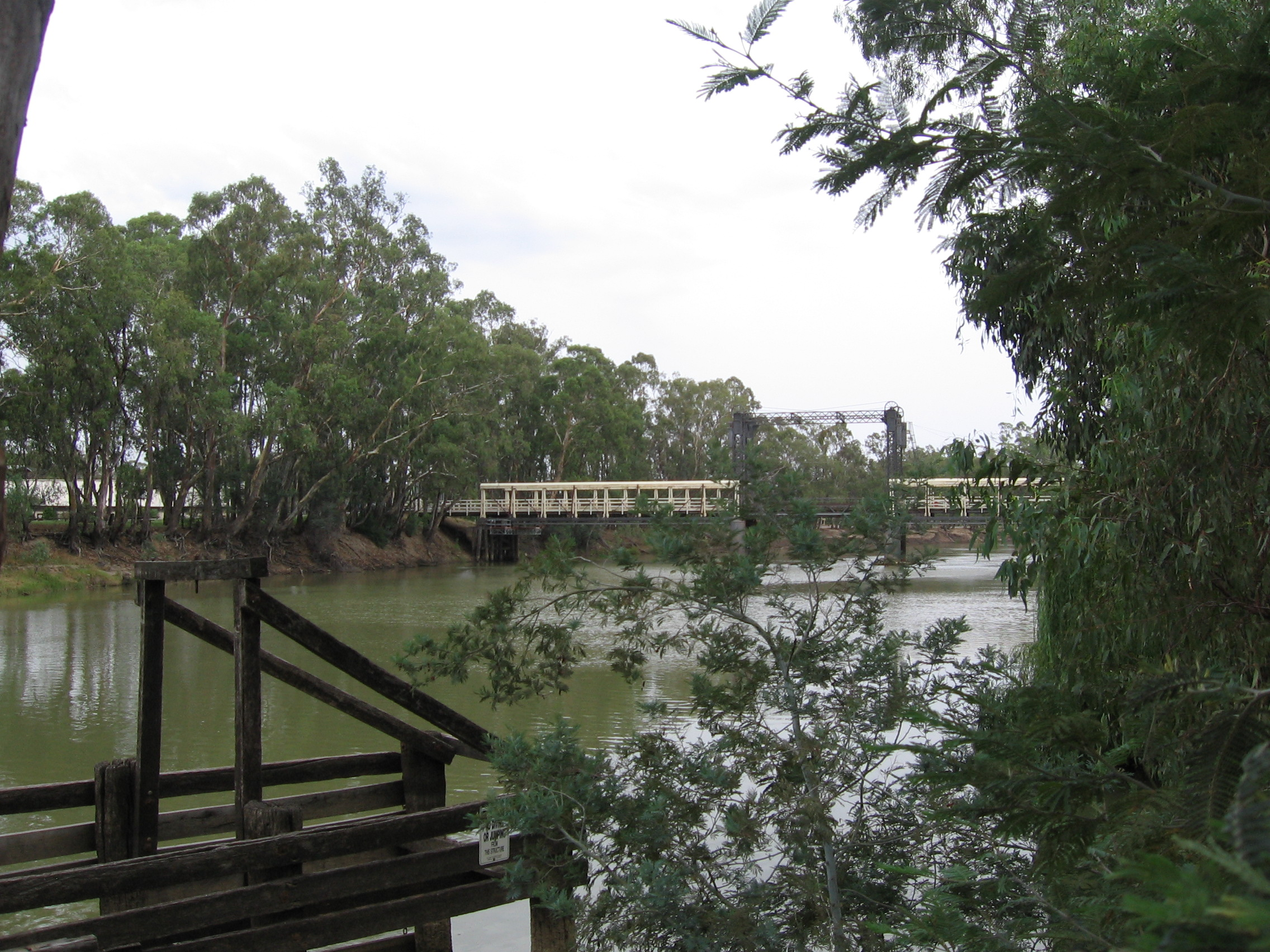
The lift span bridge over the Murray River to Koondrook, Victoria

Barham is a town in the western Riverina district of New South Wales, Australia. The town is located 823 kilometres south west of the state capital, Sydney and 303 kilometres north west of Melbourne. Situated on the banks of the Murray River across from Koondrook in the neighbouring state of Victoria, Barham had a population of 1,159 at the 2016 census. The town is in the Murray River Council local government area.

== History ==
For thousands of years before white explorers arrived, the Barababaraba people camped, hunted fished and gardened here. Their cooking mounds, scar trees, middens and artefacts can readily be found on private land and throughout the forests. Each nomadic clan had their own territory with exclusive rights to the camping, fishing and hunting. There was some vigorous resistance to the first settlers, but the indigenous population dramatically decreased in the late 1800s, mainly due to disease.

The history of white settlement begins in 1843 when the 114,656 acre 'Barham' station was taken up by Edward Green, who named it after the maiden name of his wife. The south bank of the Murray was then settled towards the end of the Victorian gold rush where squatters grazed sheep and cattle. The typical Australian struggle between squatters (on vast acreage) and selectors (who took up small lots) was played out throughout the district, with selectors such as Parkman, McConnell and Hudson moving in to take up small farms within the Barham station lease from 1877.

The Post Office opened on 1 January 1895. Growth was slow until 1904 with the construction of a lift span bridge designed to allow paddle steamers through.

== Heritage listings ==
Barham has a number of heritage-listed sites, including:

- 319 Main Road: Barham Bridge over Murray River

Also of historic and architectural interest in Barham are the Royal Hotel (1904) and the National Bank building (1912).

== Timber industry ==
From the early 1870s, timber cutters began to set up camps and log the river red gums (Eucalyptus camaldulensis) that grow in the surrounding forests. Koondrook, on the Victorian side, developed more quickly than Barham, soon becoming the centre of a large forest industry with the timber being used to build boats and paddle steamers. Some of these boats are still operating, the paddle steamer Melbourne, built at Koondrook in 1914 is a tourist attraction at Mildura, the Alexander Arbuthnot, built in 1923, and the Emmylou built in 1980-1982 operate in Echuca. The timber industry has continued to supply building timber, garden timber and firewood with several sawmills operating in the area. The Bonum Sawmill, occupying land at the Northern edge of Barham, incorporated several significant value-adding enterprises, such as a kiln, veneering and finger-jointing before closing in 2010 when the New South Wales government closed access to many of the forest areas following many years of drought and poor tree growth.

== Barham Bridge ==
Barham's development was aided when a lift span bridge across the river opened in 1904, designed by Ernest de Burgh of the Department of Public Works and constructed by Monash & Anderson, with John Monash in charge. The bridge replaced a punt that was used to ferry people, stock and goods across the river, and allowed road access between the Riverina and the Victorian markets, while permitting the passage of paddle steamers when the middle section was raised. Until it was motorised in 1997 it was operated by a system of weights worked by two men turning wheels. The span is still occasionally raised. The bridge is now one of the oldest remaining across the Murray River. A similar bridge was constructed upstream at the same time between Cobram, Victoria and Barooga, New South Wales.

== Agriculture ==
The region boasts a rich agriculture based on irrigation including rice, sheep, citrus, cereal crops, dairy, walnuts, olives, and beef cattle.

== The town today ==
The major industries in and around Barham are agriculture, including dairying and citrus, and forestry. Like much of the southern Riverina, the town is attuned culturally to Victoria, reading Victorian newspapers and watching Victorian television channels. The most popular team sport is Australian rules football, the town in conjunction with neighbouring township Koondrook across the Murray having an Australian Rules football team competing in the Central Murray Football League.

Golfers play at the Barham Golf and Country Club on Moulamein Road.

== Population ==
In the 2016 Census, there were 1,159 people in Barham. 83.5% of people were born in Australia and 89.9% of people only spoke English at home. The most common responses for religion were Anglican 28.6%, No Religion 24.4% and Catholic 18.1%.

== Notable people ==
Barham is the birthplace of Australian cyclist Michael Rogers.
