= Moulamein =

- Town
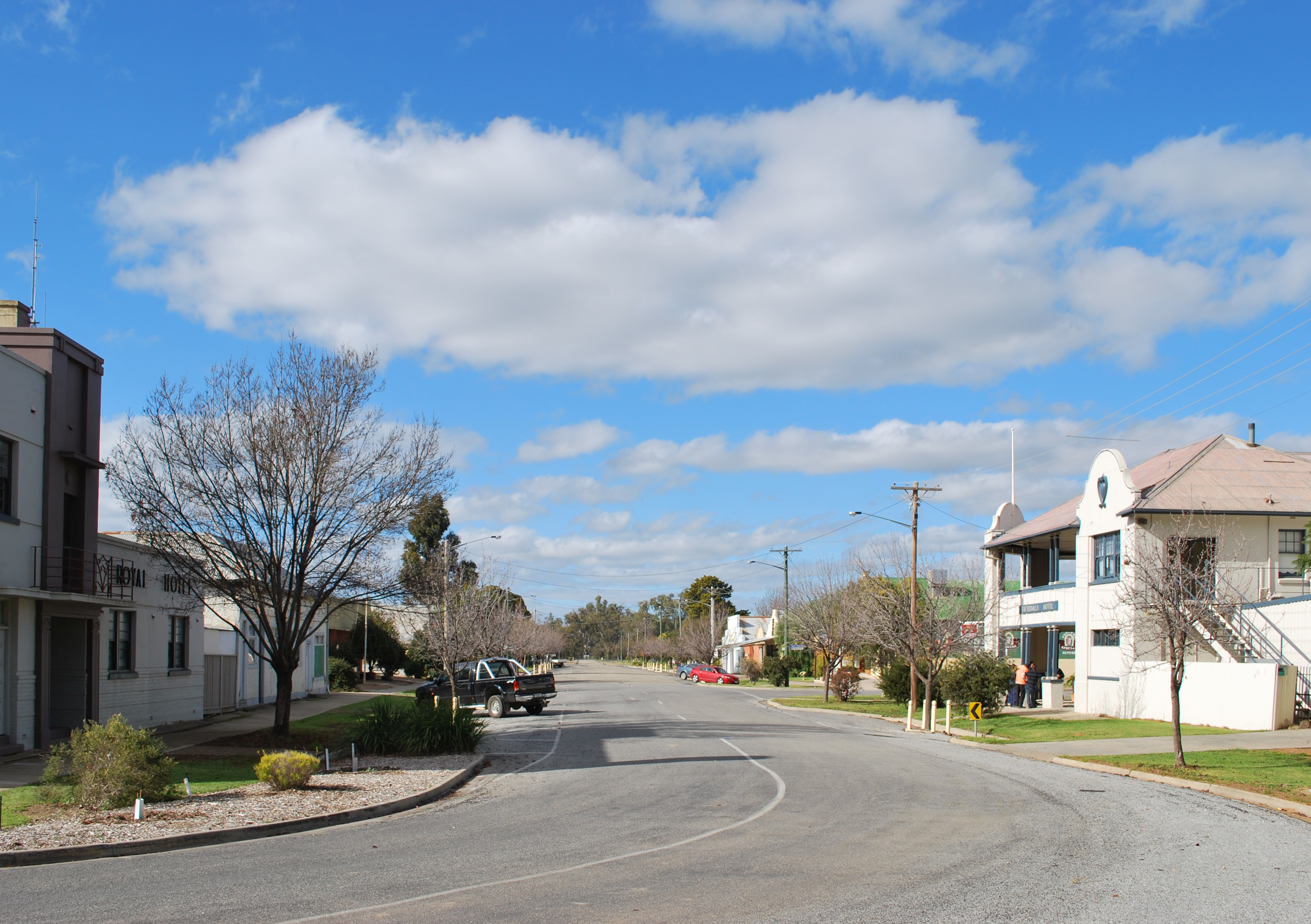
- Morago Street, the main street of Moulamein, with the former Royal Hotel on the left and the Tattersalls Hotel on the right

- Coordinates: 35°05′0″S 144°02′0″E
- Country: Australia
- State: New South Wales
- LGA: Murray River Council
- Location: 68 km (42 mi) NE of Swan Hill; 105 km (65 mi) NW of Deniliquin

Government
  - State electorate: Murray
  - Federal division: Farrer
- Elevation: 74 m (243 ft)

Population
  - Total: 484 (2016 census)
- Postcode: 2733
- County: Wakool

Moulamein /ˈmuːləmiːn/ is a small town in New South Wales, Australia, in the Murray River Council local government area. At the 2016 census, Moulamein had a population of 484 . Moulamein is the oldest town in the Riverina.

The town is located between Balranald, Hay, Deniliquin and Swan Hill, at the junction of the Edward River and Billabong Creek. The name Moulamein is believed to be derived from a local Aboriginal word meaning "the meeting of the waters". However, another popular theory states it was named after the seaport of Mawlamyine in Myanmar, then known as Moulmein, which was the capital of British Burma at the time.

The climate of this area is semi-arid, and the area is rich in birdlife such as waterfowl, wedge-tailed eagles and emus. This area also has many kangaroos.

== History ==
Some accounts of Moulamein’s history make unsourced statements such as: "settled as early as 1830". However it is highly unlikely the township was established as early as 1830 considering that this was about the time of Charles Sturt’s exploration along the Murrumbidgee River just to the north of this region.

In about 1842 Augustus Morris came to the Riverina seeking grazing land in association with the entrepreneur and speculator Benjamin Boyd. Morris took up pastoral runs on the Edward River and explored the country surrounding the site of present-day Moulamein. Morris was apparently the first European to describe the confluence of the Edward River and Billabong Creek as "The Moulamein".

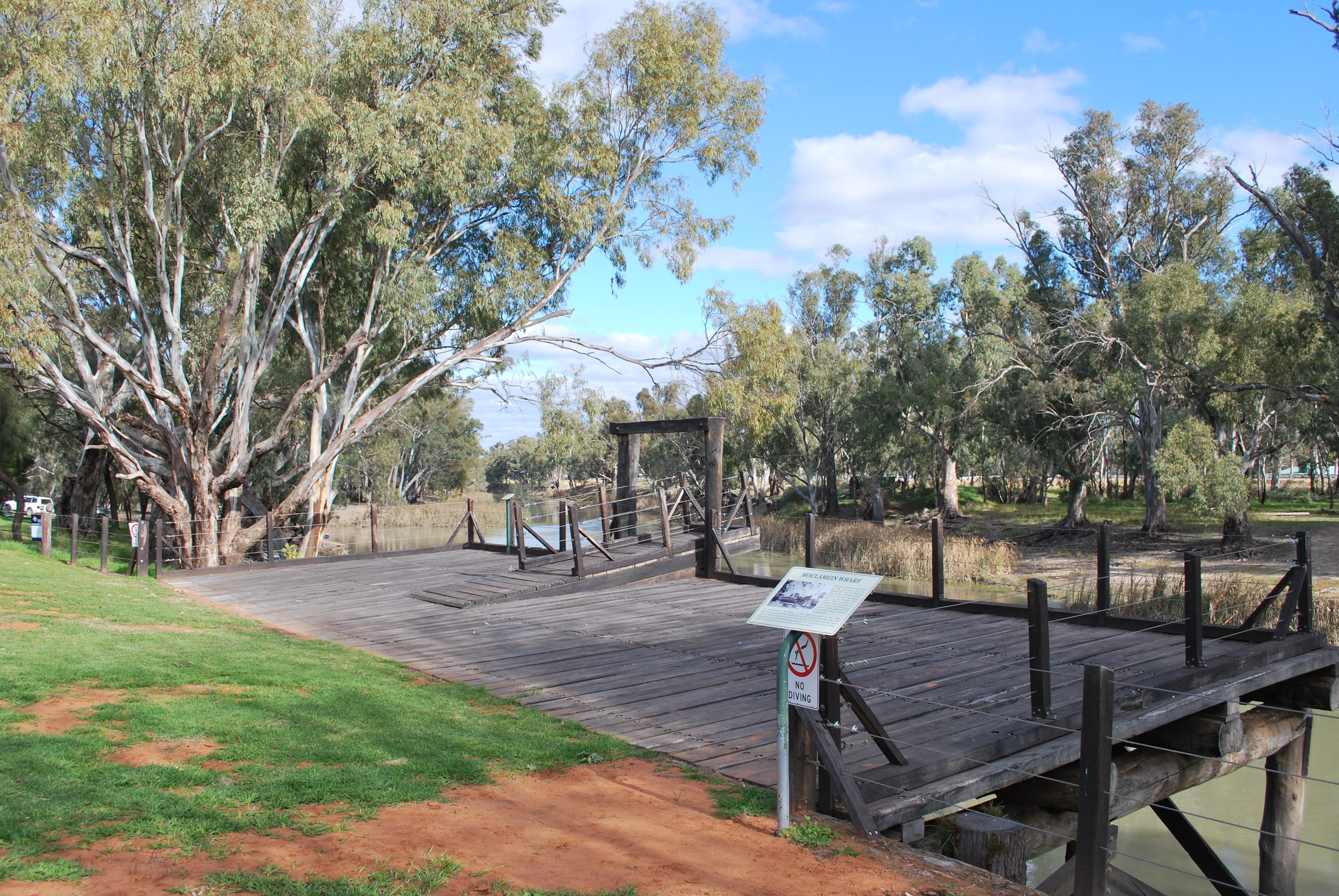
The old wharf at Moulamein on the Edward River; riverboats carted wool and other products to and from Moulamein until the coming of the railway in 1923

Existing records of the Moulamein Court of Petty Sessions begin in 1847. In June 1848 a contract was let for a court-house and lock-up to be built at Moulamein (to be finished within six weeks). Moulamein Post Office opened on 1 October 1849 and the Clerk of Petty Sessions at Moulamein, Cornelius de Witt Jebb, applied for the position of postmaster. The post office closed in 1851 and was not reopened until 1859. Moulamein's court-house pre-dated the one at Albury, so prisoners were brought there to be tried from far-flung regions of the Riverina. Richard Edward Wright established the Moulamein Inn at the location in 1848 and was granted a licence for the hotel in February 1849. In November 1849 approval was granted for Moulamein to be laid out as a township. It was surveyed by Thomas Townsend in 1851 and its township status gazetted on 9 September that year. Moulamein's first court-house was demolished in 1860.

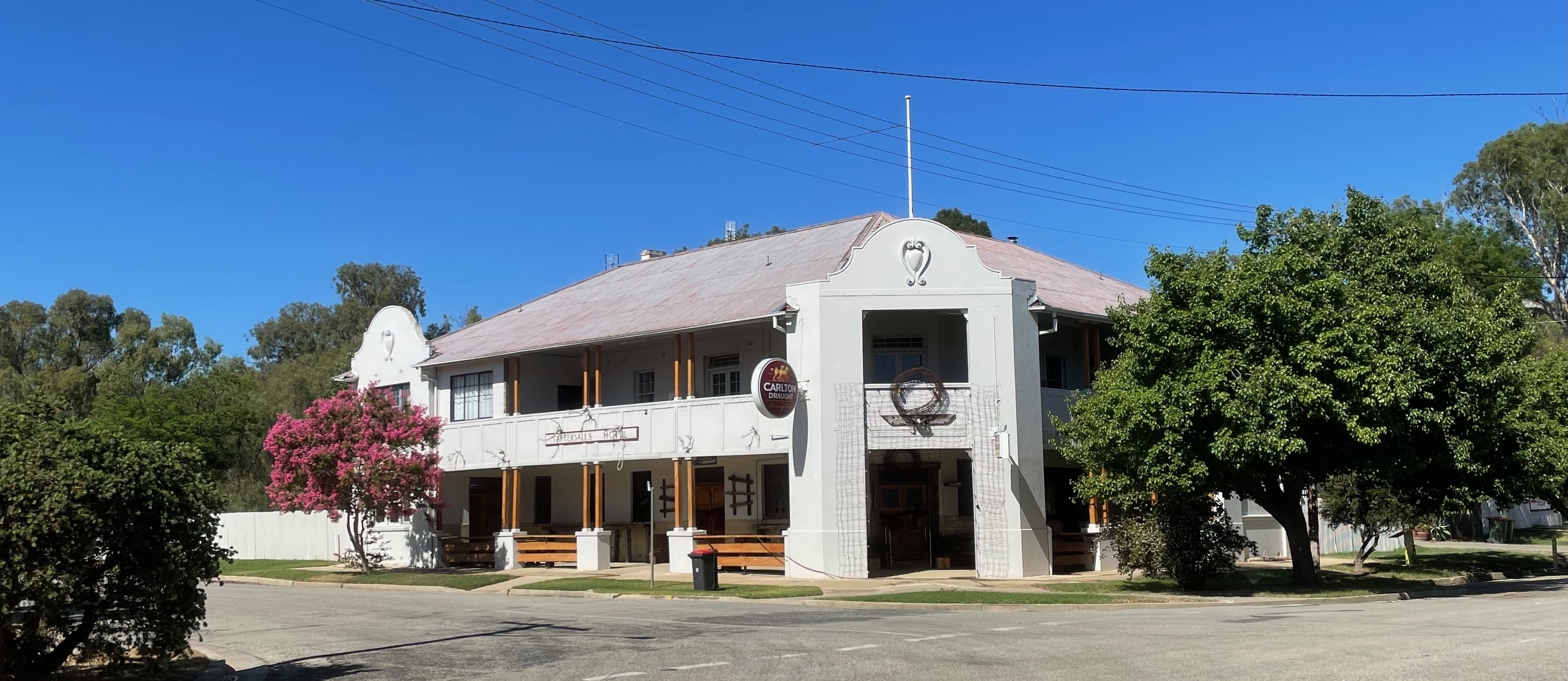
Tattersalls Hotel, Moulamein

During the period 1864 to 1866 George Ashcroft held the licence of the Traveller's Rest Hotel at Moulamein.

In 1866 it was reported that Moulamein had a population of 100 persons. At that time the township had two hotels, a post-office and "some stores". A tender was accepted for a school to be built at Moulamein in June 1866.

== Sport ==
Horse racing at Moulamein Racecourse dates back to 1878. Moulamein Racing Club conducts an annual non-TAB thoroughbred race meeting, featuring a six-race programme headlined by the Moulamein Cup over 1,600 metres. Racing return to a crowd of 1,300 people in 2023, following a four-year interruption.
