= Alby Herman =

Australian rules footballer

Personal information
- Full name: Albert Ernest Herman
- Born: 28 March 1879; Hay, New South Wales
- Died: 11 February 1924 (aged 44); South Melbourne, Victoria

Playing career^{1}
Years	Club	Games (Goals)
1905	St Kilda	1 (0)
- ^{1} Playing statistics correct to the end of 1905.

Albert Ernest Herman (28 March 1879 – 11 February 1924) was an Australian rules footballer who played for the St Kilda Football Club in the Victorian Football League (VFL).
