= John Dyson (Australian cricketer) =

Australian cricketer

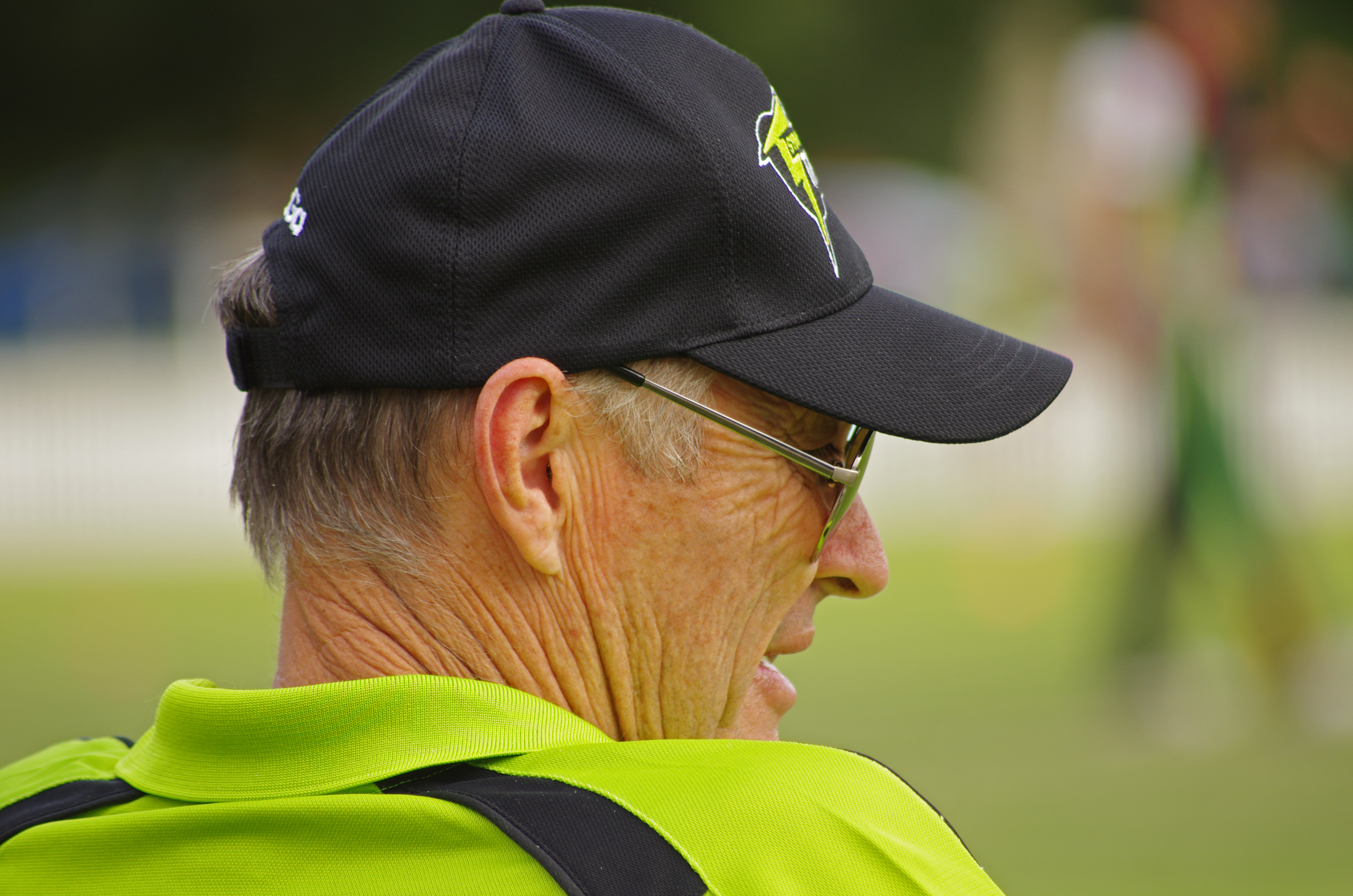

Personal information
- Full name: John Dyson
- Born: 11 June 1954 (age 72); Kogarah, New South Wales, Australia
- Batting: Right-handed
- Role: Opening batsman

International information
- National side: Australia
- Test debut (cap 289): 16 December 1977 v India
- Last Test: 11 December 1984 v West Indies
- ODI debut (cap 60): 22 August 1980 v England
- Last ODI: 31 January 1983 v New Zealand

Domestic team information
- Years: Team
- 1975/76–1989/90: New South Wales

Career statistics
Competition	Test	ODI	FC	LA
Matches	30	29	156	77
Runs scored	1,359	755	9,935	2,654
Batting average	26.64	32.82	40.22	39.61
100s/50s	2/5	0/4	19/53	4/15
Top score	127*	79	241	126*
Balls bowled	–	–	109	7
Wickets	–	–	2	1
Bowling average	–	–	33.00	9.00
5 wickets in innings	–	–	0	0
10 wickets in match	–	–	0	0
Best bowling	–	–	1/0	1/7
Catches/stumpings	10/–	12/–	99/–	23/1
- Source: Cricinfo, 18 November 2008

John Dyson (born 11 June 1954) is an Australian former international cricketer (batsman) who is now a cricket coach, most recently in charge of the West Indies.

He played 30 Test matches and 29 One Day Internationals for Australia between 1977 and 1984. He did not enjoy as much success at the international level as he did at the first class level. In first-class matches, he scored nearly 10,000 runs at an average of 40. Dyson is probably best remembered for his "catch of the century" at the Sydney Cricket Ground in 1982, when he caught Sylvester Clarke in the outfield, over his head, at a 45-degree angle to the ground, running backwards.

Dyson participated in two "rebel tours" of South Africa in 1985–86 and 1986–87 in defiance of the international sporting boycott of the apartheid state, scoring over 1,000 runs. He played soccer as a goalkeeper in the Sutherland Shire (Cronulla RSL) and was a member of the side that won the Dallimore Competition and runners-up in the NSW Amateur Cup final. He was a team member of the Como West Junior Soccer Club (Sutherland Shire) successful 18A, 1971 Champion of Champion team, progressed to play in Sutherland and St. George Grade and was also selected in the N.S.W. U20 squad.

On 21 October 2007 he was named as coach of the West Indies having previously coached Sri Lanka from 2003 to 2005. On 20 March 2009 he incorrectly called the West Indies in because of bad light after 46.2 overs of an ODI against England. His decision to do so was based on a faulty D/L calculation because of a fall of wicket on the second ball of the 47th over, thereby causing his team to lose a match it had a good chance of winning.

He was sacked as the coach of the West Indies on 13 August 2009 shortly before the team was due to play in the ICC Champions Trophy in South Africa.

In January 2024, Dyson was inducted in the New South Wales hall of fame.

== Early career ==
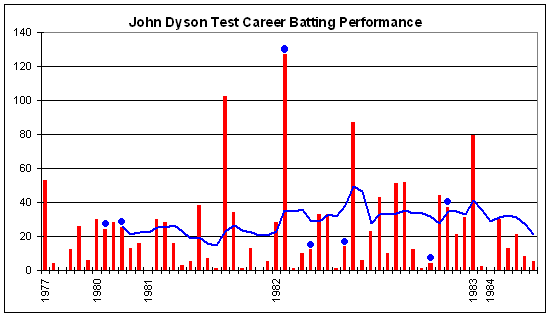
John Dyson's Test career batting performance.

In 1975–76, Dyson was made NSW 12th man for a game against the touring West Indies side. He then scored 159 for NSW Colts against Victorian Colts. This led to Dyson being selected to make his first class debut, for NSW against Qld. He played three first class games that summer with a high score of 28 before being dropped for Graeme Hughes. Ian Chappell claimed when Dyson "first played for NSW he was labelled a 'strokeless wonder' and then dropped after a spate of low and slow scoring."

In 1976-77 Dyson scored 342 first class runs at 42.75, including a century against Tasmania.

== Test debut ==
=== 1977–78: Test debut ===
The loss of many senior Australian players to World Series Cricket in 1977 saw spots open up in the Australian test team. Dyson attracted attention early in the 1977–78 season with a man of the match innings against Queensland in a Gillette Cup semi final. He followed it with innings of 102 off 366 balls for NSW against WA and scores of 65 against the touring Indians and 103 against Victoria.

Australia were struggling to find experienced in-form opening batters. Alan Turner, a former test opener, played so badly that season he ended up retiring from cricket. The openers chosen for the first test were Paul Hibbert and Gary Cosier, both of whom failed. Hibbert was dropped for the second test (after having only been given one game) and was replaced by John Dyson, who had made 355 runs at 59 that summer, although batting at three.

In his test debut, Dyson made 53 runs in the first innings, taking part in a crucial partnership of 84 with captain Bob Simpson. These runs would prove crucial in a narrow Australian victory.

Dyson was kept in the Australian side for the next two tests. He scored 0 and 12 in the third test and 26 and 6 and the fourth, with Australia losing both games. Dyson was dropped from the side for the fifth test and was not picked on the subsequent tour of the West Indies. Ian Chappell later wrote he felt it was "strange" Dyson was picked to play India but overlooked for the West Indies tour as "most players considered Dyson a poor player of spin – in which the Indians are strong – but a good player of fast bowling – in which the Caribbeans are of course devastating."

That summer Dyson became the first known Sydney player to wear a helmet playing grade cricket.

Dyson spent the 1978 Australian winter playing for Haslingden in the Lancashire League.

=== 1978–79 ===
Dyson was unable to force his way back into the test team during the 1978–79 summer, although Bob Simpson felt he was the best opening batsman in Australia after Graeme Wood. Dyson was dropped from the state side early on for a Gillette Cup game but bounced back to make 57 in a districts game.

Dyson was back in the state side replacing Ron Crippin. He scored an impressive 67 against the touring English.

He went on to score 619 runs at 44.21 including a top score of 197 against Tasmania. However Australian selectors preferred Andrew Hilditch.

=== 1979–80 ===
Dyson scored 55 in a state trial game but was overlooked by NSW in favor of Trevor Chappell. This was controversial because it was felt the selectors had bias towards World Series players. However Dyson soon forced his way back into the side and had a reasonably successful season scoring 729 first class runs at 42, and scoring a century for Randwick in the Sydney Club final.

Dyson was rewarded in selection for the Australian squad to tour England in 1980, picked over Rick McCosker and Julien Weiner. "I'm stunned," he said at the time. "I just can't believe it."

On the English tour, Dyson played only three first class games with a top score of 33. He was overlooked for the Centenary Test in favour of Bruce Laird and Graeme Wood.

== Return to Test side ==
=== 1980–81 ===
Dyson had an excellent 1980–81 summer domestically including a record first wicket partnership with Rick McCosker against WA. He scored 430 runs from six innings with an average of 107.5 which earned him a recall for the Australian ODI side. He scored 69 and 79 in ODIs against New Zealand.

Dyson's one day form and aggregate of 430 from six Sheffield Shield innings saw him recalled to the test side in November 1980, replacing Bruce Laird for the first test against New Zealand. Ian Chappell wrote, "Dyson has been criticised, abused, omitted, overlooked and plain forgotten but each time he shrugs it off and returns to the fray a more accomplished and determined player." Chappell felt that while Dyson "is no Keith Stackpole" he was "very consistent, he's hard to get out, he has a ton of grit and he's determined to keep on improving his game. What more can be asked of a man whose primary task is to see the shine off the new ball?" Chappell did think Laird and Dyson should not open together "as they're too similar in style" but felt Dyson and Graeme Wood were an ideal combination. Bill O'Reilly called Dyson "easily our most dependable opening batsman and he has so many attractive shots and that he will prove to be our best new ball batsman since Bill Lawry and Bob Simpson, with a chance of surpassing both."

On his recall Dyson scored 30 and 24 not out, taking part in an opening stand of 80 in the first innings. In the following tests against New Zealand he made 28 and 25 and 13 and 16.

Dyson kept his spot for the following test series against India. He made 0, 30 and 28 and 16 and 3.

Dyson scored 1028 first class runs that summer at 57.11. He was second in the highest Sheffield Shield run scorers in that season, with 815 runs at 90.56 – only Greg Chappell amassed more. In February 1981 Ian Chappell left out Dyson from Chappell's hypothetical test squad to England "because he seems to have a mental barrier about making big scores in test cricket." However Dyson was selected on the tour.

=== 1981 Ashes ===
In the first test Dyson scored 5 and 38 then made 7 and 1. Steve Rixon, his teammate, insisted "Dyson has got it all. He is as good a player as any in this team. The only problem is that John Dyson doesn't have any confidence in John Dyson."

In the third test he scored 102 in the first innings and 34 in the second but the match is best remembered for being a famous Australian defeat.

Dyson made 1 and 13 in the fourth test and 0 and 5 for the fifth. He was dropped for the last game and replaced by NSW teammate Dirk Wellham, who scored a century on debut.

=== 1981–82: Third stint in Test side ===
Dyson missed the three tests against Pakistan with the selectors choosing Graeme Wood and Bruce Laird as openers. However Dyson scored 98 and 123 for NSW against the West Indian touring side which earned a recall for the second test against the West Indies. He replaced Dirk Wellham who had been dropped and batted at number three, behind Wood and Laird. But that stage Dyson had played 14 tests, scoring 520 runs from 27 innings, and only passed 50 twice.

In that game he scored 28, a match saving 127 not out and taking his famous "catch of the century" Bob Simpson wrote:

Dyson played the innings of his life. His class, assurance, and flair caught many by surprise, but for me confirmed the talent I always knew he had... Why he has suddenly thrown off the shackles that have manacled his skills for so long is known only to Dyson. That he has been able to do so should permanently release the self doubts that have infested his cricket for too long.

In the third test he made 1 and 10. He made 709 first class runs that season at 54.53. He scored 101 in a McDonald's Cup semi final.

Dyson kept his spot for the tour of New Zealand. He made 12, 33 and 1 and 14.

=== 1982–83: Pakistan and England ===
Dyson toured Pakistan in 1982, playing all three tests. He started well scoring 87 and 6 then made 23 and 43 and 10 and 51.

Dyson played all five tests at home during the 1982–83 Ashes. He had scores of 52 and 12, 1 and 4, 44 and 37, 21 and 31 and 79 and 2. In the fifth test he appeared to have been run out before he scored, was given not out, then went on to score 79.

Dyson made 43 & 59 for New South Wales against an England XI at the SCG and 44 in a 50 over match against New Zealand. He won Man of the Match in an ODI against New Zealand, scoring 76 not out. However, despite averaging almost 40 in the first nine ODIs he was dropped from the Australian one day side.

Dyson scored 52 against the touring Sri Lanka team for New South Wales at the SCG. He was not selected for the Australian squad that toured Sri Lanka in 1983 or the squad for the 1983 World Cup in England.

=== 1983–84: Prolific season for NSW ===
Despite scoring 178 against Victoria, Dyson was overlooked for selection in the first test against Pakistan in favour of Wayne Phillips. He was not selected in the one day time either, selectors preferring Phillips and Steve Smith. Dyson went on to score 1015 runs in the Sheffield Shield that summer at 63.43, including a career best score of 241. He shared the competition's Player of the Year award with Brian Davison of Tasmania. Despite this outstanding season, he didn't earn a place on the Australian tours of the West Indies and India, with his fellow New South Welshman Steve Smith preferred as an alternative opener to Wessels and Phillips. When Wessels had to return early from the West Indies tour due to injury, Graeem Wood was sent out to replace him rather than Dyson.

However, the highlight of this year was the birth of Dyson's first child, Alexis.

=== 1984–85: Final stint in Test side and domestic success ===
Tremendous domestic form saw Dyson earn a recall to the test team in November 1984 to play the West Indies. In the first test he made 0 and 30, the latter off 135 balls. In the next two tests he made 13 and 21, and 8 and 5. Dyson did score 98 and 16 for NSW against the West Indies in a tour match prior to the second test.

After the third test Bob Simpson wrote he considered Dyson "the best equipped opener in Australia" but felt he "is not playing to his full potential and would benefit from a spell against the lightning pace of the West Indies." Dyson was dropped for Andrew Hilditch in the fourth test and never regained his spot.

Dyson scored 79 in the McDonald's Cup final for NSW in an 88 run win over South Australia and 66 in NSW first innings of the Sheffield Shield final victory against Queensland at the SCG.

He scored 897 first class runs at 40.77. Phil Wilkins called Dyson "the most valuable man in the" New South Wales team that summer. Bob Simpson, NSW coach, wrote "Dyson has repeatedly played positive cricket to set up wins for NSW" although "his performances are often ignored."

Dyson hit 105 in the Tooheys Cup in which locals mixed with elite NSW players.

== Rebel tours and return to NSW ==
=== 1985–87: Rebel tours to South Africa ===
During their successful Sheffield Shield campaign of 1984/85 for NSW teammate Imran Khan said that he hoped Dyson would be selected for the Ashes tour to England in the summer of 1985. However it emerged that Dyson had agreed to participate in an Australian rebel tour to South Africa. Dyson sought leave for three years from his PE teaching job at Caringbah High School to play in South Africa but this was refused by Rodney Cavalier, new South Wales Minister for Education. He was banned from playing in Australia for two years and three years from the international team along with the other rebels.

Dyson enjoyed two productive trips to South Africa. He scored 577 first class runs in 1985–86 at 44.38 then made 522 runs at 52.2 the following summer. Steve Smith later said Dyson "was our backbone" in South Africa:

We all relied on Dyso. His temperament and concentration are enormous. We expected him to stay at the crease for long periods of time. More often than not, he did. There were times when he batted right through the innings when the blokes were just not doing their job.

=== 1988–89: Later career ===
Dyson expressed a desire to regain a place in the test side when his ban was over but he struggled on his return to NSW in January 1988 making 157 runs at 19.62 from 5 games during the 1987/88 season with a highest score of 60 not out. For most of the matches he would open the batting with Mark Taylor.

The following summer was more successful, scoring 742 runs at 39.05 including 79 and 100 not out for NSW against the touring West Indians and 34 for NSW against Pakistan. He scored 112 not out against Tasmania in the Sheffield Shield at the SCG which was his nineteenth and final first-class century. Dyson's good form led to speculation he could earn a place on the tour to England for the 1989 Ashes series however he was not selected.

Dyson captained NSW for two FAI cup games at the start of the 1989–90 season but suffered a knee injury and was replaced in the side by Steve Small for the first Sheffield Shield match against South Australia in Adelaide. The selectors then preferred promising prospect Geoff Milliken and Dyson never regained his state place. He had amassed 9935 first class runs at an average of 40.

=== 1989–98 ===
Dyson continued to play first grade cricket for Sutherland and was captain of the side which included a young Glenn McGrath.

In 1991, NSW captain Geoff Lawson attempted to persuade the selectors to recall Dyson but they decided against it.

He continued to play grade cricket until 1994.

Dyson was NSW's Assistant Coach to Lawson from 1995 to 1997.

He represented Australia in two masters tournaments (1995 and 1998).

== Coaching career ==
In 2003 Dyson took over from Dav Whatmore as Sri Lanka's coach, a post he held for two years. During his time in charge he steered the Sri Lankans to second in the ICC's ODI rankings. He was later appointed coach of the West Indies in October 2007. Dyson immediately guided the Caribbean side to their first ever away test match victory against South Africa. He also was in charge for a drawn two match 2008–09 away test series against New Zealand and a 2009 home test series win over England. During a subsequent return away test series against Three Lions the Windies suffered a whitewash. Dyson was thereafter axed as the team's head coach by the West Indies cricket board.
