= Hay War Memorial High School =

Public high school in New South Wales, Australia

Location
- 216 Pine Street, Hay, New South Wales; Australia
- Coordinates: 34.5051°S 144.8407°E

Information
- Type: Public co-educational secondary day school
- Motto: Latin: Pro Tanto Quid Retribuemus ("For so much what shall we repay")
- Established: 28 January 1918 (HHS); 25 April 1923 (HWMHS)
- Educational authority: NSW Department of Education
- Principal: Jo St Hill
- Years: 7–12
- Enrolment: ~155
- Colour(s): Purple and gold
- Yearbook: Waradgery
- Website: haywarmem-h.schools.nsw.gov.au

Hay War Memorial High School (abbreviated as HWMHS) is a public co-educational secondary day school, located on Pine Street in central Hay, a town located in the western Riverina region of New South Wales, Australia. The school is operated by the NSW Department of Education with students from Year 7 to Year 12. The school was originally established on 1 January 1918 at the Hay Public School campus, but moved to a separate purpose-built site on Anzac Day, 25 April 1923, half paid for by public subscription from the citizens of Hay, as the town's war memorial to the service of Hay and district citizens in the First World War.

== History ==
The provision of secondary education in the town of Hay was limited prior to the establishment of the high school. In 1908, the Hay Public School (established in 1869) was upgraded in status to a District School, which provided both primary and secondary education in the same school. In early 1917, the citizens of the town lobbied the NSW Government for the establishment of a separate high school, and a deputation led by the local state member of parliament for Murray, Robert Scobie, met with the Minister of Public Instruction, Augustus James, who committed to investigate the establishment of a high school in the town. The establishment of a public high school in Hay was formally announced in the Government Gazette on 8 October 1917. On 1 January 1918, the Hay High School was established in a section of the existing buildings at Hay District School (which was downgraded to a primary school) on Lachlan Street, with an initial enrolment of 38 boys and 31 girls.

With the new school attracting students from as far afield as Broken Hill, the need for student hostel accommodation became acute. In August 1918, the government acquired "Lansdowne" house in Moppett Street to establish the first student hostel. As the student population grew, additional hostels opened in the town, growing to five by 1935: Claughton House (Presbyterian, opened 1925), Butterworth (Methodist girls, opened 1921), Riverina House Hostel (Anglican girls, opened 1930), the Government Hostel (Lansdowne, opened 1918), and the Linton House hostel (Anglican boys, 1935–1946).

In the years following the end of the First World War, the town of Hay sought ideas for commemorating the service of Hay citizens in the war. At a meeting held on 19 September 1919, a formal committee investigating proposals agreed upon the construction of a purpose-built memorial high school, with an estimated cost of between £6,000 and £8,000 and a commitment from the Department of Education to meet half the cost, if the town was able to raise the remaining half. With the establishment of the Hay War Memorial Fund to collect public donations for the project in early 1920, The Riverine Grazier opined:

It may fairly be asked what has induced Hay to decide upon a War Memorial High School. The answer is that such an institution has a measure of permanency about it that many other methods cannot claim; that it tends to make Hay the educational centre of Riverina; and that it will be a constant reminder to the growing children of Hay of the splendid part their forefathers played in the greatest of all wars. In our opinion, these are worthy objects of a war memorial; they are objects which make no levy on future generations for cost, of maintenance; and they perpetuate, in the most effective manner, the memories of those who gave their lives, or who jeopardised their lives, in the cause of freedom.

On 2 August 1920, the Hay Municipal Council voted unanimously to set aside a 27-acre (11 ha) site in central Hay for the school.

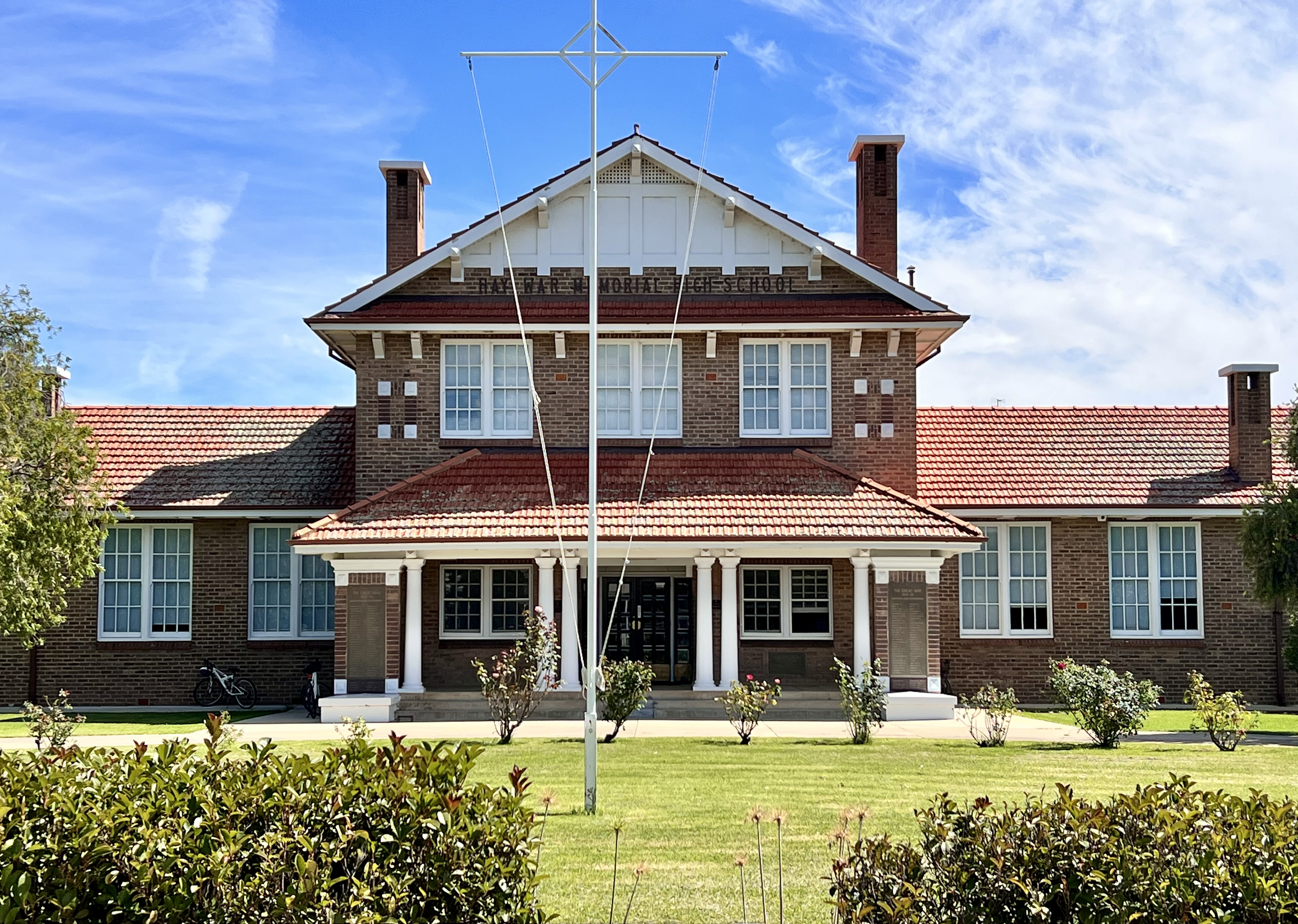
The original 1923 school building on Pine Street.

By December 1921, the public subscription goal of £6,000 was almost met, and the NSW Department of Public Works had commenced construction of the school buildings, designed by the Department Architect and later New South Wales Government Architect, Richard Wells, with the department acquiring bricks from the NSW State Brickworks in Homebush. On 9 March 1922, the foundation stone for the school was laid by the Minister for Education, Thomas Mutch, in a ceremony attended by the Director of Education, Peter Board, and the Mayor of Hay, W. H. Bent.

The completed Hay War Memorial High School was finally opened on 25 April 1923, Anzac Day, by the Minister for Education, Albert Bruntnell, with the final cost coming to £15,980. The completed building included trachyte slabs as rolls of honour for the war memorial, installed on the façade. The architectural journal, Building, noted that the school was "of exceptionally fine design in its architectural features. The brickwork used to fine advantage, and the entrance porch is a pretentious affair with broad steps and finely grouped columns." On 20 May 1926, the school was visited by the Governor-General of Australia, Lord Stonehaven, who declared that it was the "finest war memorial in the British Empire".

The first headmaster of the school was Leslie Ethelbert Penman, BA, who served from 1918 until 1925, when he was appointed to be headmaster of Goulburn High School. The second headmaster was R. C. Taylor, BA BEc, from 1925 to 1928. The third headmaster was James H. Killip, BA, from 1928 to 1931. The fourth headmaster was Hector Walker, MA, from 1931 to 1933. The fifth headmaster from 1933 to 1937 was Arthur Andrew Beckett, BA BEc.

More recent additions to the school such as the library and art, technics and music building were built in 1973, and additional classrooms were built in 1984. On 3 July 2007, the science and library block was severely damaged by a gas explosion. A 14-year-old boy was later arrested and charged for the crime. The original main building of the school, and associated landscaping, movable items, and war memorials, are listed as a heritage item in the NSW Department of Education Section 170 Heritage Register.

== See also ==
- List of government schools in New South Wales
- Education in Australia
