= Hay Post Office =

Historic site in New South Wales

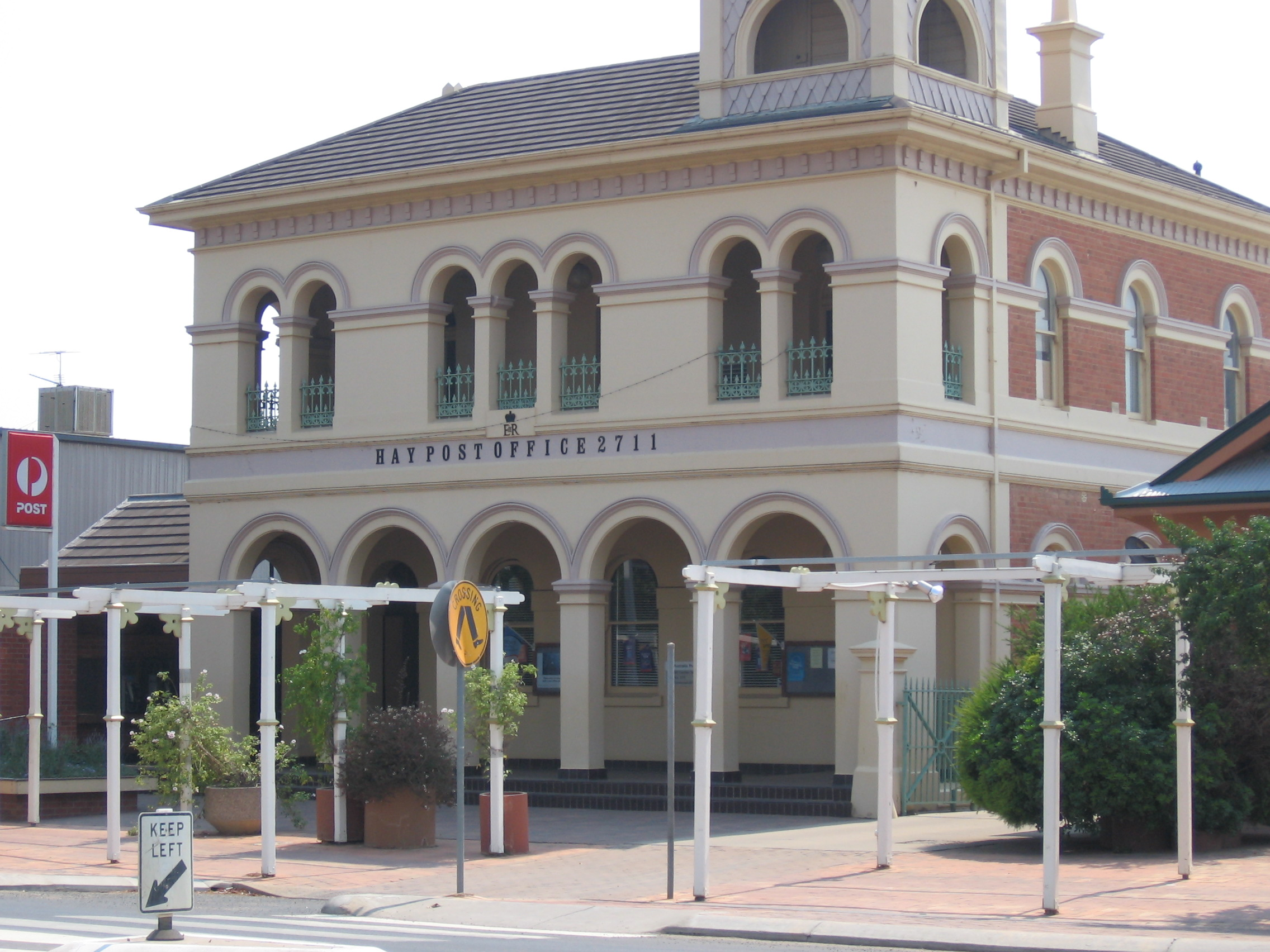

- Location within New South Wales Location within Australia
- 34.5095°S 144.8431°E
- Location: 120 Lachlan Street, Hay, New South Wales, Australia

Site notes
- Architect: Designed by the Colonial Architect’s Office under James Barnet.
- Owner: Australia Post

New South Wales Heritage Register
- Official name: Hay Post Office
- Type: state heritage (built)
- Designated: 22 December 2000
- Reference no.: 1441
- Type: Post Office
- Category: Postal and Telecommunications
- Builders: E Noble and Co under the management of RW Duncan.

Hay Post Office is a heritage-listed post office at 120 Lachlan Street, Hay, New South Wales, Australia. It was designed by the Colonial Architect's Office under James Barnet, and built by E. Noble and Co. The ground floor is leased by Australia Post.

== History ==
British occupation of the area

In 1829 Charles Sturt and his men passed along the Murrumbidgee River on horses and drays. During the late-1830s stock was regularly overlanded to South Australia via the Lower Murrumbidgee. At the same time stockholders were edging westward along the Lachlan, Murrumbidgee, Billabong and Murray systems. By 1839 all of the river frontages in the vicinity of present-day Hay were occupied by squatters. By the mid-1850s pastoral runs in the western Riverina were well-established and prosperous. The nearby Victorian gold rush provided an expanding market for stock. The prime fattening country of the Riverina became a sort of holding centre, from where the Victorian market could be supplied as required.

The locality where Hay township developed was originally known as Lang's Crossing-place (named after three brothers named Lang who were leaseholders of runs on the southern side of the river). It was the crossing on the Murrumbidgee River of a well-travelled stock-route (known as 'the Great North Road') leading to the markets of Victoria. In 1856/57 Captain Francis Cadell, pioneer of steam-navigation on the Murray River, placed a manager at Lang's Crossing-place with the task of establishing a store (initially in a tent). In August 1858 steamers owned by rival owners, Francis Cadell and William Randell, successfully travelled up the Murrumbidgee as far as Lang's Crossing-place (with Cadell's steamer Albury continuing up-river to Gundagai). By October 1859 Hay had been chosen as the name for the township [after John Hay, a wealthy squatter from the Upper Murray, member of the New South Wales Legislative Assembly and former Secretary of Lands and Works]. Hay, situated on the Murrumbidgee, was gazetted as a town in 1859. In the late nineteenth century, several grand buildings representing Hay's aspirations to become the capital of the Riverina were built. However inter-colonial disputes over trade thwarted these aspirations and instead of booming Hay remained small and isolated, but importantly connected to Sydney via the Hay railway line.

Postal Services

The first official postal service in Australia was established in April 1809, when the Sydney merchant Isaac Nichols was appointed as the first Postmaster in the colony of NSW. Prior to this, mail had been distributed directly by the captain of the ship on which the mail arrived, however this system was neither reliable nor secure.

In 1825 the colonial administration was empowered to establish a Postmaster General's Department, which had previously been administered from Britain.

In 1828 the first post offices outside of Sydney were established, with offices in Bathurst, Campbelltown, Parramatta, Liverpool, Newcastle, Penrith and Windsor. By 1839 there were forty post offices in the colony, with more opened as settlement spread. During the 1860s, the advance of postal services was further increased as the railway network began to be established throughout NSW. In 1863, the Postmaster General W. H. Christie noted that accommodation facilities for Postmasters in some post offices was quite limited, and stated that it was a matter of importance that "post masters should reside and sleep under the same roof as the office".

The first telegraph line was opened in Victoria in March 1854 and in NSW in 1858. The NSW colonial government constructed two lines from the General Post Office, Sydney, one to the South Head Signal Station, the other to Liverpool. Development was slow in NSW compared to the other states, with the Government of New South Wales concentrating on the development of country offices before suburban ones. As the line spread, however, telegraph offices were built to accommodate the operators. Unlike the post office, the telegraph office needed specialised equipment and could not be easily accommodated in a local store or private residence. Post and telegraph offices operated separately until 1870 when the departments were amalgamated, after which time new offices were built to include both postal and telegraph services. In 1881 the first telephone exchange was opened in Sydney, three years after the first tests in Adelaide. As with the telegraph, the telephone system soon began to extend into country areas, with telephone exchanges appearing in country NSW from the late 1880s onwards. Again the Post Office was responsible for the public telephone exchange, further emphasising its place in the community as a provider of communications services.

The appointment of James Barnet as Acting Colonial Architect in 1862 coincided with a considerable increase in funding to the public works program. Between 1865 and 1890 the Colonial Architects Office was responsible for the building and maintenance of 169 Post Offices and telegraph offices in NSW. The post offices constructed during this period featured in a variety of architectural styles, as Barnet argued that the local parliamentary representatives always preferred "different patterns".

The construction of new post offices continued throughout the 1890s depression years under the leadership of Walter Liberty Vernon, who held office from 1890 to 1911. While twenty-seven post offices were built between 1892 and 1895, funding to the Government Architect's Office was cut from 1893 to 1895, causing Vernon to postpone a number of projects.

Following Federation in 1901, the Commonwealth Government took over responsibility for post, telegraph and telephone offices, with the Department of Home Affairs Works Division being made responsible for post office construction. In 1916 construction was transferred to the Department of Works & Railways, with the Department of the Interior responsible during World War II.

On 22 December 1975, the Postmaster General's Department was abolished and replaced by the Postal & Telecommunications Department with Australia Post and Telecom established. In 1989, the Australian Postal Corporation Act established Australia Post as a self-funding entity, heralding a new direction in property management, including a move away from the larger more traditional buildings towards smaller shop-front style post offices.

For much of its history, the post office has been responsible for a wide variety of community services including mail distribution, an agency for the Commonwealth Savings Bank, electoral enrolments, and the provision of telegraph and telephone services. The town post office has served as a focal point for the community, most often built in a prominent position in the centre of town close to other public buildings, creating a nucleus of civic buildings and community pride.

=== Hay Post Office ===
The town of Hay grew up around what was an important crossing on the Murrumbidgee River. Known as Langs Crossing, it was a major ford for droving cattle from Queensland across the river to the developing Victoria goldfields. With regular traffic crossing the river, a small settlement began to develop to serve the drovers. Captain Francis Cadell, a local landowner and river boat operator, made the first representations for a Post Office in the late 1850s. Cadell approached the Post Master General George Macleay for a post office, suggesting Alex Dunbar who looked after Cadell's store, as postmaster. This first request was rejected by the PMG, which preferred to wait until the town was officially gazetted until approving an office.

Hay was gazetted in 1859, being named after the local member of parliament Sir John Hay. With Hay an official town, the first postal service could commence. A weekly delivery between Condobolin and Hay began from 1 April 1859, with the delivery place being Cadell's store. The first postmaster appointed to Hay was Robert Neilson who had taken over the duties of Alex Dunbar at Cadell's store after Dunbar returned to England. Neilson resigned his position as postmaster in 1861, as the workload of running a store and the post office was too much. In 1862 the then postmaster Alfred Prince, who was manager of Cadell's former store (now owned by Mr Bardwell), operated the Post Office out of a new purpose-built, brick extension adjacent to the store.

In April 1864 a telegraph station was opened in Hay. Around this time, Alfred Prince resigned as postmaster and Bardwell acted as a temporary replacement. In January 1865 a temporary officer was sent to Hay from Sydney and operated the post office out of the telegraph station, a government-owned building. At this stage the postal and telegraph departments operated as separate government departments and subsequently usually operated out of separate buildings. With this in mind, a number of local businessmen in Hay offered to locate the post office within their businesses, at the charge of (Pounds)1 per week. However, it was decided that the local telegraph operator, C. A. Middleton, would also act as postmaster, with post and telegraph services operating out of the same building.

In 1869 Middleton was promoted to a position in Wagga and was replaced by E. D. Scott as Post and Telegraph Master. Scott received an assistant in 1870 after complaining to the Post Master General that his duties as post and telegraph master were too much for one person. Scott was responsible for repairing damaged telegraph lines in the district and would often be called away from the Post Office, leaving his wife in charge of the Post Office and the telegraph office closed. Scott was granted £25 per annum to pay for an assistant, but left the job soon after being replaced by W. H. Hilliard, who in turn was replaced in December 1870 by R. S. Arnott.

During the late nineteenth century, Hay was developing as an important centre for the Riverina. The improvements to community services were a direct result of this economic and population growth. In 1876 the Government Savings Bank opened a branch in the Hay Post Office, and it was recommended that a new post and telegraph office be erected. The following year, a postal inspector visited Hay and recommended that a new building be erected in Moppett Street at the rear of the Court House. The Hay Council rejected this site in August 1878 as being too isolated, with a site in Lachlan Street being suggested instead. Meanwhile, extensions had been made to the old building.

The site that the Council proposed was the site of the existing post and telegraph office. Adjacent to this site was the former Hay lock-up that was being replaced by a Hay Gaol, then in the course of construction. It was this site that was decided on for the new office. Tenders were called and early in 1881 the tender of E. Noble & Co. was adopted for erection of the new building at an estimated cost of £3,030. Designed by Colonial Architect James Barnet, the new post and telegraph building was completed and occupied by 18 December 1882. An iron-rail fence and stabling were added a couple of years later.

In 1890 a clock, which had been removed from the Bathurst Post Office, was placed on the balcony. This clock proved unreliable and it was decided to erect a clock tower to house a new clock. In July 1901 the clock tower was completed with a new four dial clock and hour bell installed at a total cost of £495. The design of the clock tower was possibly undertaken by the NSW Government Architect's Office under Walter Liberty Vernon. A local watchmaker, Mr Hardingham, was given the contract to wind and regulate the clock for £8 per annum.

In 1974 the Post Office was extensively renovated and restored, which included the addition of public telephone boxes on the southern side. In 1979 the office was classified by the National Trust of Australia (NSW). In 1988 Hay Post Office was painted in a sympathetic colour scheme and a pergola with climbing plants was constructed on the footpath at the front of the building.

== Description ==
Hay Post Office was constructed in 1882 in the main street and civic centre of Hay. It is a two-storey Victorian Italianate building, with a three-storey clock tower on the northeastern corner. An English bond brick building, it features an ashlar rendered eastern facade wrapping around part of the side facades. The remainder of the two-storey section of the building is face brick. There are two rendered, single-storey later additions to the rear along the northern side of the building, as well as a face brick c. 1980s–90s single-storey addition to the western side of the building.

The roof of the two-storey section of the building is a U-shaped hipped roof clad with slate or similar tiling. There is also later, profiled sheet metal cladding the sawtooth roof over the rear, single-storey mailroom and rear flat sections of roof. The slate or similar tiling is also present over the first single-storey addition along the northern side and over the southern side addition over the telephone booths. The stepped corner tower is capped with a pyramidal, rolled and lapped sheet metal roof, with a narrow hipped roof section cladding the step below the clock faces with the same material. There is a finial at the apex. Three chimneys punctuate the two-storey roofline, one each to the north, west and south sides. The chimneys are rendered and painted cream with moulded tops. There are crown-type chimney pots topping the northern and southern chimneys, and none on the western chimney.

The clock tower has four clock faces installed on the upper level of each side, with black lettering on a white background. The tower is detailed with fish scaled shingles and arches to the lower level. The bell of the tower tolls hourly and is now controlled by an electric motor. It has been suggested that the original mechanism is retained within the tower, however the tower was inaccessible during the time of inspection in May 2000.

Hay Post Office has an ashlar rendered front facade and corners in a cream and grey colour scheme, with moulded arched openings continuous with horizontal moulded string courses at the ground floor arch bases, above and below the first floor and at the base of the upper floor arches. There is also a dentil course running around beneath the eaves.

Hay Post Office has a symmetrical two-storey arcade along the eastern facade. The ground floor of the facade has a five bay arcade of round-headed arches fronting Lachlan Street, surmounted by a first-floor arcade with groups of smaller, paired arches either side of a central group of triple arches. The ground-floor arcade is open, with modern brown tiled flooring and steps, a non-original, varnished boarded timber soffit and pendant lights. There is a wrought-iron gate within the arch at the northern end of the arcade. The arcade is continuous with the southern side addition containing the public post boxes and public telephone booths. There is a concrete ramp along the southern boundary leading from the telephone booths.

The first-floor arcade has a modern clay tiled floor and a rendered soffit with a coved cornice. The arches each have green-painted, wrought-iron balustrade sections sitting on a low masonry balustrade wall. There are modern pendant lights and there is a large aluminium vent in the wall to the lunchroom. Access to the clock tower is via a steel ladder at the northern end of the first-floor arcade.

The ground floor of Hay Post Office comprises four main areas. These include the carpeted offices and retail area to the northern side of the building, and the sheet-vinyl-floored mail room and post boxes areas.

The retail area has a lowered, varnished boarded timber ceiling containing air conditioning vents, whereas there is a false ceiling in the northern office and plasterboard in the mail room, hall and centre office. There is a tile-patterned moulded ceiling in the post boxes area with a deep moulded cornice and there is the possibility of the original ceiling being retained behind the boarded ceiling of the retail area. Lighting in the ground floor is predominantly attached and suspended fluorescent lighting, with pendant lights in the retail area.

There are original architraves on the original outer wall windows, mostly of the retail area, and much simpler, later trims to the early and modern rear addition windows. Some original architraves have been modified. Very little skirting was detected on this level, with simple strip skirting from the modern, standard Australia Post fitout.

Windows of the ground floor are predominantly single upper and lower pane timber sash windows with arched top sashes to the eastern and northern facades. There are modern internal windows in the centre office partitions, as well as modern fixed light windows in the hall and sawtooth roof over the mail room, with louvres above the post boxes. All doors on the ground floor are modern, including large sliding doors off the hall to the mail room and post boxes area and flush timber veneer doors.

The ground-floor walls are predominantly painted and rendered masonry in a grey and white colour scheme. The rear mail room has face red brick walls, with timber veneer panelling to the northern office and laminated and glazed partitions in the centre office. There are some asbestos cement sheet infill sections in the post boxes area and only one chimney breast has been retained in the retail area that has been bricked in.

The main stairwell at the centre of the ground-floor area appears to be original. The stair has polished turned timber posts and square balusters, with shaped handrail and carpeted treads leading up to a curved, vinyl-floored landing. The skirting appears to be original and there is a moulded arch in the hallway over the lower flight of steps.

The first floor of Hay Post Office comprises two major areas, including the combined lunch room/conference area at the front of the building and the staff amenities to the rear, including male and female bathrooms. This level has sheet-vinyl-flooring to all areas, except for the modern tiling in the bathrooms.

Ceilings on this level are plasterboard with a coved cornice. There are suspended and attached fluorescent lights throughout, as well as air conditioning vents and ducting in the walls and ceilings, with some bulkheads resulting.

The French doors and original windows of the first-floor arcade retain original architraves, with the exception of the northern window of the lunchroom. There are some remnants of original skirting along most of the outer walls of this level, however there are none to the internal walls.

The first floor has original French doors with later hardware and fixed arched fanlights. Original timber sash windows have single upper and lower panes with arched top sashes and there is a six-pane, upper and lower sash window in the stairwell. Internal doors are all timber veneer finish flush doors, with large fixed fanlights.

The internal walls of the first floor are asbestos cement sheet partitions, with a small section of brick wall to the southern side of the east-west hallway. The perimeter walls are painted rendered masonry and there is tiling in the bathrooms, with modern fitouts. There is a modern folding divider wall between the lunch room and conference area. Two chimney breasts have been retained on this level, however all fireplace fixtures have been removed.

Hay Post Office is set back a substantial distance from the curb, providing a forecourt for the building. This forecourt is paved, and contains planter boxes, seating and a pergola structure over the curving footpath at the front. There is also a pair of rendered square pillars with wrought-iron gates attached, located on either side of the laneway entrance, level with the front facade. These pillars match those on the northern side of the adjacent Department of Land and Water Conservation building.

The surrounding buildings are predominantly one to two-storey commercial and retail, including the two-storey Victorian Free Classical Westpac Bank on the corner to the south, and the large, single-storey WL Vernon designed, ripple iron building to the north, currently housing the Department of Land and Water Conservation. There is an unsympathetic commercial premises erected between the Post Office and the Westpac Bank, which also impacts upon the historic streetscape.

Signage to the building comprises "Hay Post Office" lettering located between the moulded string courses at the first-floor level of the Lachlan Street facade, with the royal insignia "ER" above and at the centre. There is a standard "Australia Post" sign on a pole in the planter bed located away from the building at the southern end of the forecourt.

The large rear yard of the building is concrete and bitumen, separating the Post Office from the red brick, single storey Telstra building at the western boundary of the site. There is also a temporary office building along the southern side of the site, adjacent to the Telstra building, and a lane cutting across the site along the northern boundary. Behind the Telstra building to the west is a telecommunications tower which dominates the skyline.

Hay Post Office was reported to be generally in very good condition as at 3 August 2000. The archaeological potential of the site is considered high.

The exteriors of Hay Post Office remain largely intact to their original form. The rear recent addition to the mail room is unsympathetic for the architectural style of the building. The interiors have been extensively changed to accommodate new retail and office facilities, although some original fabric has been retained including mouldings and architraves.

=== Modifications and dates ===
The original two-storey building was occupied in 1882. It is possible that the single-storey hipped roof addition to the northwestern corner of the two-storey section is original or an early addition.

A dwarf-iron fence and railing was erected and stabling provided during the mid-1880s.

During 1890, a clock was installed on the first-floor arcade.

The corner clock tower was constructed in July 1901 with a four-dial clock and an hour striking bell. The earlier clock was removed.

The construction date of the flat-roofed, western, single-storey rendered addition along the northern side is unknown, however it appears to be a much later addition.

Also unknown is the date of the reconfiguration of the mailroom and retail area for installation of post boxes as shown in the 1917 plans.

In 1974 extensive renovations and restoration was carried out, including an extension containing telephone booths on the southern side. Further extensions and additions were made to the rear of the building, probably including the construction of the centre partitioned office and reconfiguration of the first floor, the retail space and post boxes area.

In 1988 the Post Office was repainted in a sympathetic colour scheme, and at about this time, a pergola has been erected on the footpath to the front of the building. This is possibly when the varnished boarded timber soffit and retail area ceilings were installed.

During c. 1980s–90s the construction of the modern, unsympathetic, large single-storey, red brick mailroom addition occurred to the rear.

Intrusive elements include the aluminium grille in the eastern wall of the lunch room, the exposed air conditioning ducting throughout the building and the large telecommunications tower to the west of the building.

== Heritage listing ==
Hay Post Office is significant at a State level for its historical associations, aesthetic qualities and social meaning.

Hay Post Office is associated with the early development of the town, as it is linked with the original postal services established in 1859, the same year in which the town was gazetted. The current post office in Hay has been an important communications centre for the Riverina area, and is linked with the development of telegraph and telephone services to the region. The form and scale of Hay Post Office also reflects prominence and development of Hay as the major centre for the Riverina region in the late nineteenth century.

Hay Post Office is a prominent member of the Witcombe Place group of historic buildings in the civic centre of Hay, which greatly contribute to the character of the town.

Hay Post Office is aesthetically significant because it is an outstanding example of the Victorian Italianate style of architecture, and makes an important aesthetic contribution to the main thoroughfare of Hay. Hay Post Office is a strong example of the range of post offices designed by NSW Colonial Architect James Barnet.

Hay Post Office is also considered to be significant to the Hay community's sense of place.

Hay Post Office was listed on the New South Wales State Heritage Register on 22 December 2000 having satisfied the following criteria.

The place is important in demonstrating the course, or pattern, of cultural or natural history in New South Wales.

Hay Post Office is associated with the early development of the town, as it is linked with the original postal services established in 1859, the same year in which the town was gazetted. The current Post Office in Hay has been an important communications centre for the Riverina area, and is linked with the development of telegraph and telephone services to the region.

The form and scale of Hay Post Office reflects the prominence and development of Hay as the major centre for the Riverina region in the late nineteenth century.

Hay Post Office also provides evidence of the changing nature of postal and telecommunications practices in NSW.

The place has a strong or special association with a person, or group of persons, of importance of cultural or natural history of New South Wales's history.

NSW Colonial Architect James Barnet, a key practitioner of the Victorian Italianate style of architecture, designed Hay Post Office. The Colonial Architect's Office under Barnet designed and maintained a number of post offices across NSW between 1865 and 1890.

The 1901 clock tower addition was possibly designed by the NSW Government Architect's Office under Walter Liberty Vernon.

The place is important in demonstrating aesthetic characteristics and/or a high degree of creative or technical achievement in New South Wales.

Hay Post Office is aesthetically significant because it is a strong example of the Victorian Italianate style of architecture and makes an important aesthetic contribution to the main thoroughfare of Hay.

Hay Post Office is a prominent member of the Witcombe Place group of historic buildings in the civic centre of Hay, which greatly contribute to the character of the town. This group includes the Shire Offices (former 1896 court house), the Department of Land and Water Conservation and the present Westpac Bank.

The scale, architectural style and location of the building, along with the later but sympathetic corner clock tower, make it a local landmark for Hay.

The round arched arcades compare with Forbes Post Office (1881). It is also important for its unusual clock tower and the treatment of the front facade.

The place has strong or special association with a particular community or cultural group in New South Wales for social, cultural or spiritual reasons.

Hay Post Office is an important local landmark, and has been the centre of communications for the town for over a century. As such, it is considered to be highly significant to the community of Hays sense of place.

The place has potential to yield information that will contribute to an understanding of the cultural or natural history of New South Wales.

The Hay Post Office site has some potential to provide archaeological information about the previous use of the site, particularly the Gaol.

The place possesses uncommon, rare or endangered aspects of the cultural or natural history of New South Wales.

Hay Post Office is a particularly fine example of the work by James Barnet, and features an unusual facade treatment. The clock tower is an interesting example of a sympathetic Federation period addition to a Victorian period building.

The place is important in demonstrating the principal characteristics of a class of cultural or natural places/environments in New South Wales.

Hay Post Office is a strong example of the Victorian Italianate style of architecture, and is representative of the work of Colonial Architect James Barnet on post offices across NSW.
