= Tom Ledwidge =

Australian rules footballer, born 1911

Personal information
- Full name: Thomas Michael Ledwidge
- Born: 18 June 1911; Hay, New South Wales
- Died: 6 October 1986 (aged 75); Jerilderie, New South Wales
- Original team: Yarrawonga
- Height: 187 cm (6 ft 2 in)
- Weight: 91 kg (201 lb)

Playing career^{1}
Years	Club	Games (Goals)
1936, 1938	Fitzroy	6 (3)
- ^{1} Playing statistics correct to the end of 1938.

Thomas Michael Ledwidge (18 June 1911 – 6 October 1986) was an Australian rules footballer who played with Fitzroy in the Victorian Football League (VFL).
