= Hay, New South Wales =

Hay
- Town
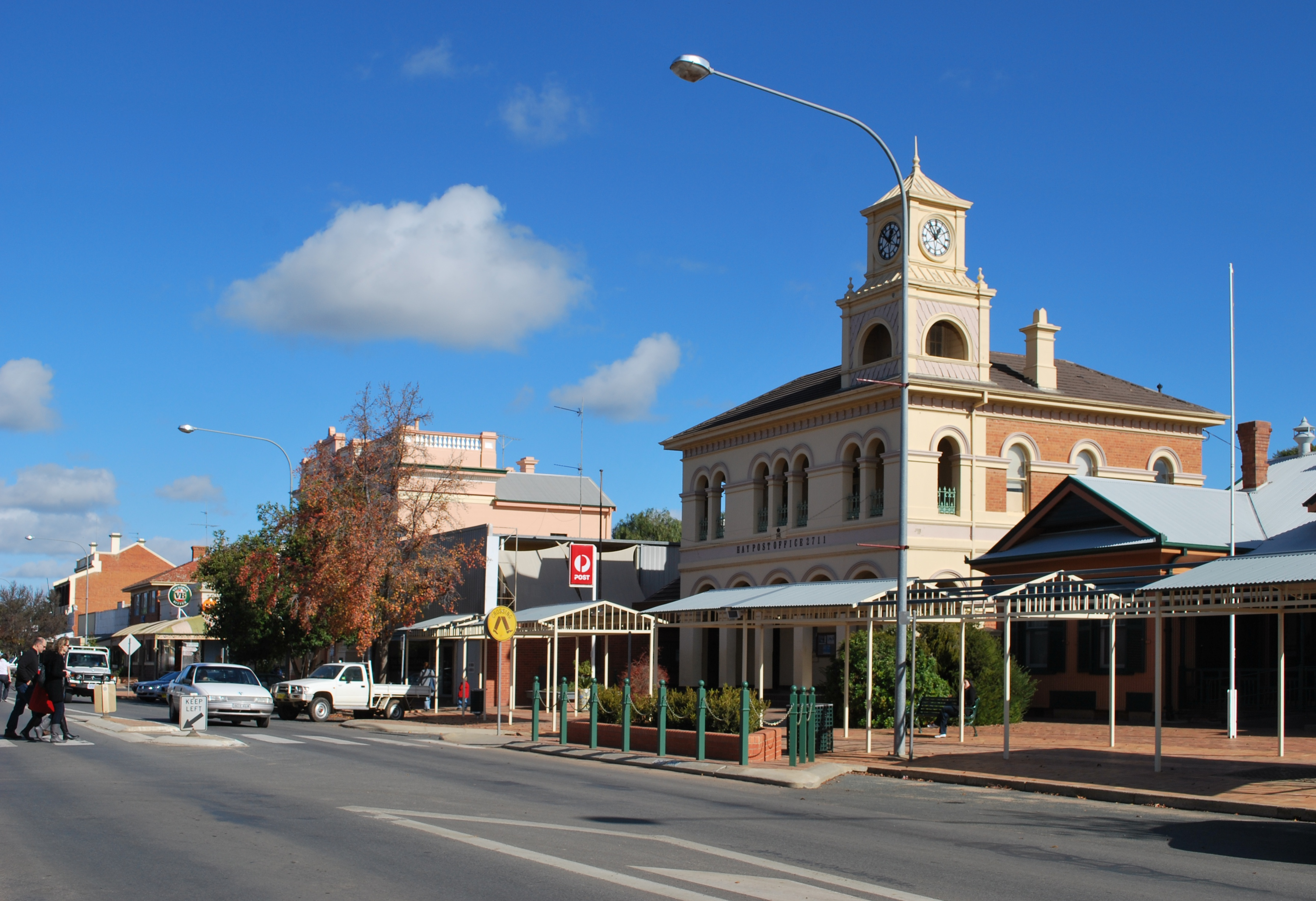
- Looking south down Lachlan Street, the main street of Hay

- Coordinates: 34°30′0″S 144°51′0″E
- Country: Australia
- State: New South Wales
- LGA: Hay Shire
- Location: 719 km (447 mi) WSW of Sydney; 409 km (254 mi) N of Melbourne; 153 km (95 mi) WSW of Griffith
- Established: 1859

Government
  - State electorate: Murray
  - Federal division: Farrer
- Elevation: 93.3 m (306 ft)

Population
  - Total: 2,882 (2021 census)
- Postcode: 2711
- County: Waradgery
- Mean max temp: 24.3 °C (75.7 °F)
- Mean min temp: 10.0 °C (50.0 °F)
- Annual rainfall: 368.3 mm (14.50 in)

Hay is a town in the western Riverina region of south-western New South Wales, Australia. It is the administrative centre of Hay Shire local government area and the centre of a prosperous and productive agricultural district on the wide Hay Plains.

Located approximately midway between Sydney and Adelaide at the junction of the Sturt, Cobb and Mid-Western Highways, Hay is an important regional and national transport node. The town itself is built beside the Murrumbidgee River, part of the Murray–Darling river system; Australia's largest. The main business district of Hay is situated on the north bank of the river.

== History ==
Aboriginal communities in the western Riverina were traditionally concentrated in the more habitable river corridors and amongst the reedbeds of the region. The district surrounding Hay was occupied by at least three separate Aboriginal groups at the time of European settler expansion onto their lands. The area around the present township appears to have been a site of interaction between the Nari-Nari people of the Lower Murrumbidgee and the Wiradjuri who inhabited a vast region in the central-western inland of New South Wales.

In late 1829 Charles Sturt and his men passed along the Murrumbidgee River on horses and drays. They launched their whale-boat near the Murrumbidgee-Lachlan junction and continued the journey by boat to the Murray River and eventually to the sea at Lake Alexandrina (before returning by the same route). During the late-1830s stock was regularly overlanded to South Australia via the Lower Murrumbidgee. At the same time stockholders were edging westward along and the Lachlan, Murrumbidgee, Billabong and Murray systems. By 1839 all of the river frontages in the vicinity of present-day Hay were occupied by squatters. By the mid-1850s pastoral runs in the western Riverina were well-established and prosperous. The nearby Victorian gold-rushes provided an expanding market for stock. The prime fattening country of the Riverina became a sort of holding centre, from where the Victorian market could be supplied as required. One of the popular routes established in the mid-1850s crossed the Murrumbidgee River at Lang's Crossing-place.

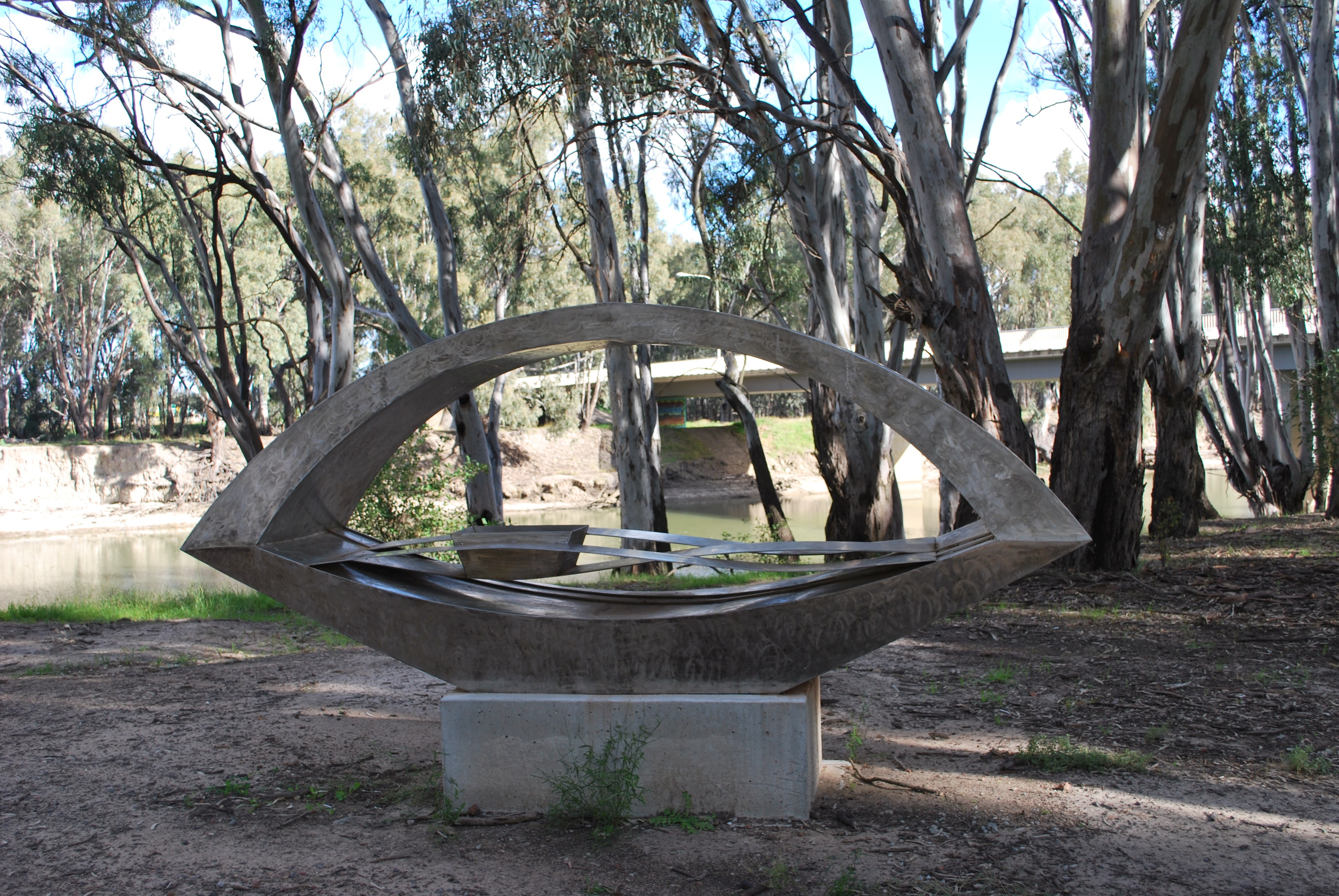
A sculpture by John Wooller titled Lang's Crossing, on the bank of the Murrumbidgee River at Hay.

=== Lang’s Crossing place ===
The locality where Hay township developed was originally known by Europeans as Lang's Crossing-place (named after three brothers named Lang who were leaseholders of runs on the southern side of the river). It was the crossing on the Murrumbidgee River of a well-travelled stock-route (known as "the Great North Road") leading to the markets of Victoria. In 1856–57 Captain Francis Cadell, pioneer of steam-navigation on the Murray River, placed a manager at Lang's Crossing-place with the task of establishing a store (initially in a tent). In December 1857 Thomas Simpson re-located from Deniliquin to establish a blacksmith shop and residence at Lang's Crossing-place. Six months later the Canadian shipwright Henry Leonard arrived; he commenced building a hotel and dwelling-house near Simpson's buildings and launched a punt on the river. In August 1858 steamers owned by rival owners, Francis Cadell and William Randell, successfully travelled up the Murrumbidgee as far as Lang's Crossing-place (with Cadell's steamer Albury continuing up-river to Gundagai).

Henry Jeffries, the leaseholder of "Illilawa" station (which included Lang's Crossing-place at its western extremity), was vehemently opposed to Henry Leonard's operations; threats against his punt caused Leonard to stand guard with a loaded gun. An attempt by Jeffries to pull down Leonard's hotel as it was being constructed caused an outcry from those advocating a settlement at the location. In consequence the NSW Government sent a surveyor to map out a new township. Henry Leonard completed his inn and opened it on 30 October 1858. The Murrumbidgee Punt Hotel was described as a "large size" weatherboard building with a shingled roof "and a fine verandah along the front". By mid-1859 the Department of Lands had proclaimed reservations on either side of the river at Lang's Crossing-place and Henry Shiell was appointed Police Magistrate. By October 1859 the township had been named "Hay" after John Hay (later Sir John), a wealthy squatter from the Upper Murray, member of the NSW Legislative Assembly and former Secretary of Lands and Works. Later the same month successful land-sales were held at Hay.

=== The township's first decades: 1859 to 1880 ===
'Lang’s Crossing Place' Post Office opened on 16 April 1859 and was renamed "Hay" to match the township name in 1861. In early 1860 a brick court-house and lock-up was built at Hay (at the site of the present post office).

The census taken in April 1861 revealed that there were 172 people living at Hay township, consisting of 115 males (of whom 25 were aged 15 years or under) and 57 females (of whom 23 were aged 15 years or under). Of the 90 males aged 16 years or more, only 38% were married or widowed; of the 34 females in this category, 76% were married or widowed. The census also enumerated the buildings at the new township: 4 brick structures; 17 of "weatherboard, slab or inferior"; and, 14 tents.

In April 1861 two new hotel licences were granted at Hay: the Caledonian Hotel (Thomas E. Blewett and George Dorward) and the Argyle Hotel (Thomas Simpson). The two hotels were located side by side in Lachlan Street. During 1862 the Argyle closed its doors, and was offered for sale. In September 1865 George Maiden briefly re-opened it as the Royal Mail Hotel. In February 1866, Christopher Ledwidge, landlord of the Caledonian Hotel since 1864, purchased the Royal Mail and incorporated the two into one hotel. The Caledonian Hotel was badly damaged by fire in 2006 and demolished the following year.

According to the 1871 census of the Colony of New South Wales there were 664 people living at Hay township: 388 males and 276 females. The proportion of those in the Hay community aged less than 16 years had increased from 28% in 1861 to 38% in 1871.

In November 1871 a petition was prepared by the residents of Hay requesting that the township be granted municipal status. Elections for aldermen were held in August 1872. At the first municipal meeting the local businessman, Frank Johns, was elected mayor.

The first bridge over the Murrumbidgee River at Hay was built in 1872 at a cost of £20,000. The structure included a turntable which enabled the middle-section to be swung open to allow the passage of steamers. The opening of the Hay Bridge was delayed while the approaches were formed. It was finally opened on 31 August 1874 by the Colonial Secretary of New South Wales, Henry Parkes. The old bridge was eventually replaced by a new one, opened in June 1973. The old Hay Bridge was subsequently demolished. The turntable, last used in 1946, was placed in the river-bend just north of where the bridge had been.

As it developed Hay became an essential hub of the surrounding district. Pastoral runs surrounding the township were the main employers of labour; with its stores and hotels, hospital, post-office, banks, court-house and police-station, Hay became an important focus for rural workers and resident squatters alike. Carriers, contractors, wool-buyers and dealers in stock established themselves at Hay and the township became a busy port for the steamers plying the inland rivers. Stores for the township and district stations were unloaded at the wharves at Hay, and the steamers and barges loaded with wool-bales for the return trip (usually to Echuca, which by 1864 had been connected by rail to Melbourne).

The writer Joseph Furphy lived at Hay in the 1870s while working as a carrier in charge of a team of bullocks. Furphy later used the area surrounding Hay as the setting for his novel Such is Life (published in 1903).

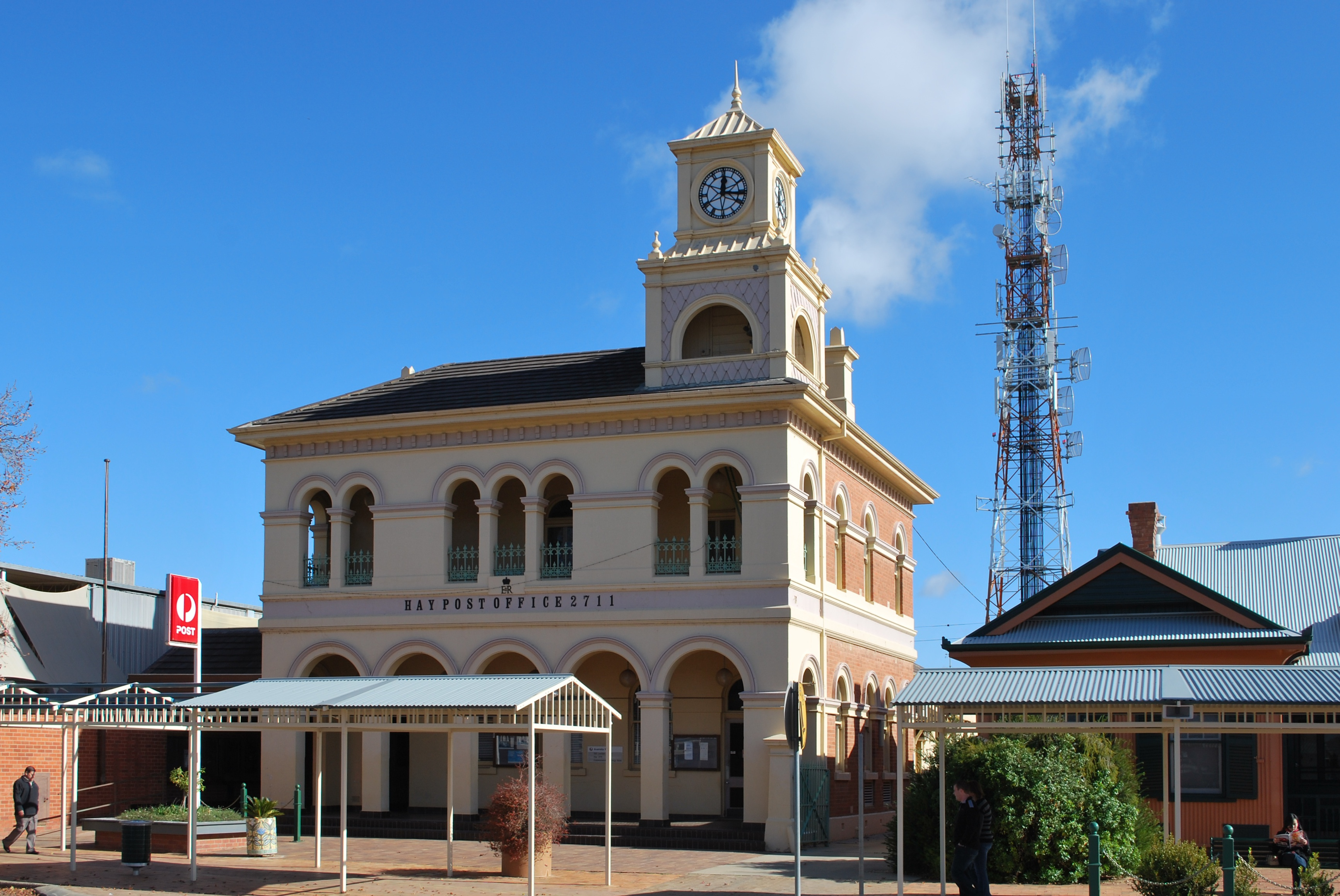
The Hay Post Office in Lachlan Street, built during 1881-2.

During 1879–80 the local building firm, Witcombe Brothers, constructed a new gaol at Hay, to replace the old Lock-up in Lachlan Street (at the site of the current Post Office). The new Hay Gaol was opened in December 1880.

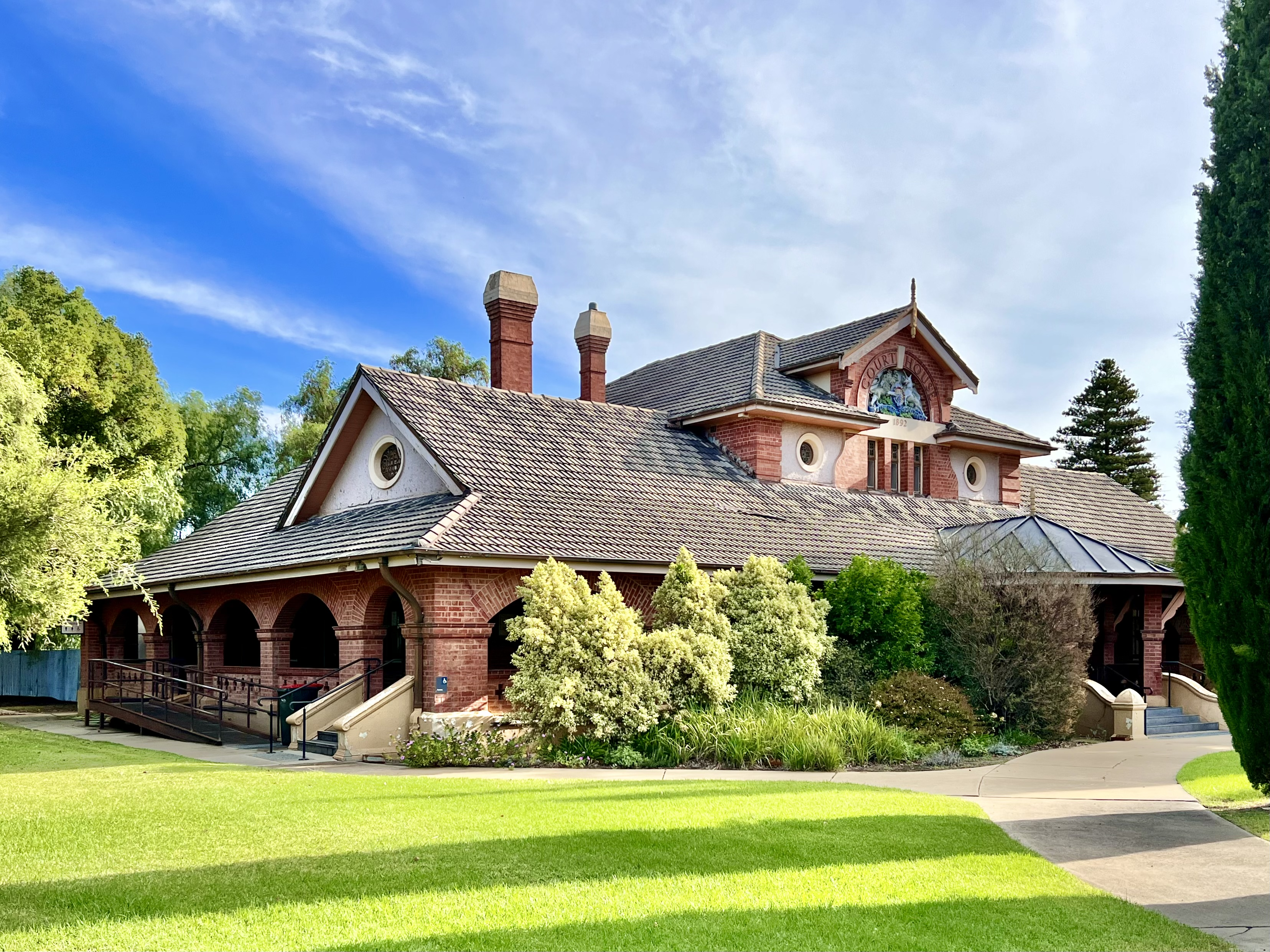
The Hay Court House in Moppett Street, built in 1892.

=== Consolidation: 1881 to 1914 ===
During 1881–82 the railway line was extended from Narrandera to Hay and a new railway station constructed at Hay. The new line, connecting Hay directly to Sydney, was opened in July 1882. The extension of the NSW railway to Hay signalled a decline in the importance of the transportation of wool by river-steamer and a shift in the local economic focus from Melbourne to Sydney. The railway to Sydney operated with a differential price structure, ensuring that rail became a desirable mode of transporting wool for many of the Riverina stations.

In 1883 the extensive Anglican diocese of Goulburn was divided, with the western half designated as the major portion of the newly created Diocese of Riverina. Hay was chosen as the episcopal seat of the new diocese and Bishop Sydney Linton was consecrated on 1 May 1884 at St Paul's Cathedral, London. Linton and his family travelled to Sydney and then on to Hay, where the bishop was enthroned on 18 March 1885 in the old St Paul's church. The new St. Paul's – pro-cathedral of the new diocese – was completed by the end of 1885. In 1889 a residence was completed for Bishop Linton at South Hay; the design and materials used in constructing the corrugated-iron clad ‘Bishop’s Lodge’ was an attempt to cope with Hay's climatic extremes. Hay remained the seat of the Anglican Diocese of Riverina until 1953 when it was transferred to Narrandera, New South Wales.

=== The Great War and afterwards ===
During the First World War 641 men enlisted for service from Hay and the surrounding district, one of the highest per capita enlistment rates in Australia. Of the men who enlisted one-in-six died during the war, with devastating effect on the close-knit communities of the Hay district.

In 1919 a proposal was adopted to build a High School at Hay as a memorial to those who died in the Great War. The Hay War Memorial High School was opened on Anzac Day, 1923, with Mr. L. E. Penman as the first headmaster.

=== Internees and POWs ===
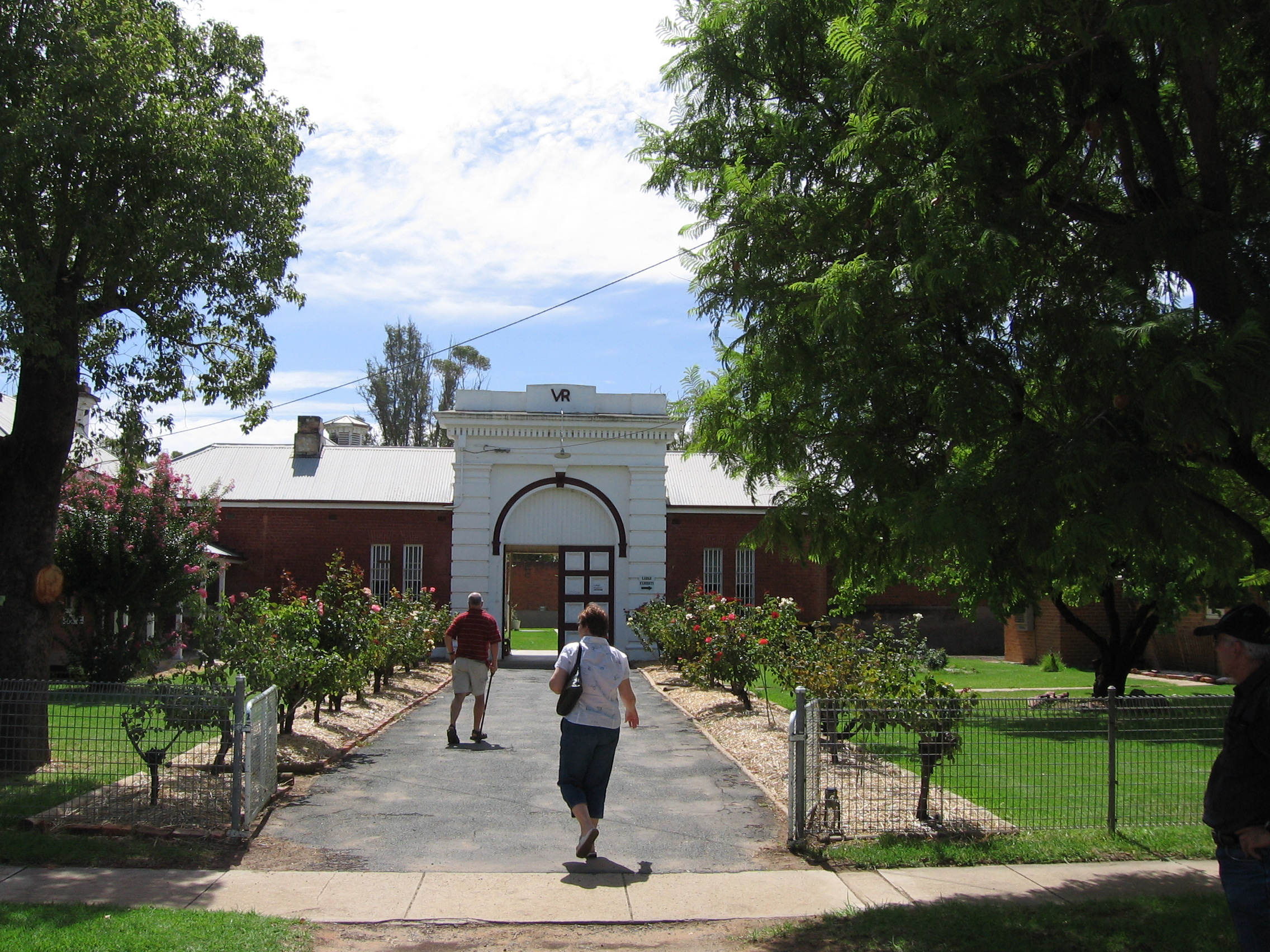
Hay Gaol is today a museum with displays detailing its varied history as a prison, POW camp and girls institution.

During World War II Hay was the location of internment and prisoner of war camps, due in no small measure to its isolated location. Three high-security camps were constructed there in 1940. The first arrivals were over two thousand refugees from Nazi Germany and Austria, many of them Jewish, aged between 16 and 60. They had been rounded up in Britain when fears of invasion were at their peak, and were then transported to Australia aboard the HMT Dunera. They arrived at Hay on 7 September 1940 in four trains from Sydney and were interned in Camps 7 and 8 (located near the Hay showground) under the guard of the 16th Garrison Battalion of the Australian Army.

Later known as the 'Dunera Boys', the internment at Hay of this assemblage of refugees from Nazi oppression in Europe was an important milestone in Australia's cultural history. 800 of those interned at Hay eventually chose to remain in Australia. The influence of this group of men on subsequent cultural, scientific and business developments in Australia is difficult to over-state; many became an integral and celebrated part of the nation's cultural and intellectual life. The 'Dunera Boys' are still fondly remembered in Hay. Every year the town holds a 'Dunera Day' in which many surviving internees return to the site of their former imprisonment.

In November 1940 the other compound at Hay, Camp 6 (near the Hay Hospital), was occupied by Italian civilian internees. Camps 7 and 8 were vacated in May 1941 when the Dunera internees left Hay; some were sent to Orange (NSW), others to Tatura in Victoria, and others to join the Pioneer Corps of the Australian Army. Upon their departure Italian prisoners-of-war were placed in Camps 7 and 8. In December 1941 Japanese internees (some from Broome and islands north of Australia) were conveyed to Hay and placed in Camp 6. In April 1942 the River Farm began operating on the eastern edge of the town, enabling market-gardening and other farm activities to be carried out by the Italian internees and POWs. In August 1944, in the wake of the Cowra POW break-out on 5 August 1944, 600 Japanese POWs were transferred to Hay and placed in the two high-security compounds 7 and 8. On 1 March 1946 the last of the Japanese POWs left Hay. During 1946 the Italians who remained there were progressively released or transferred to other camps, and the Hay camps were dismantled, and building materials and fittings sold off, by June the following year.

== Heritage listings ==
Hay has a number of heritage-listed sites, including:

- 355 Church Street: Hay Gaol
- 120 Lachlan Street: Hay Post Office
- Moama Street: Bishops Lodge
- Narrandera–Hay railway: Hay railway station

== Geography & Climate ==
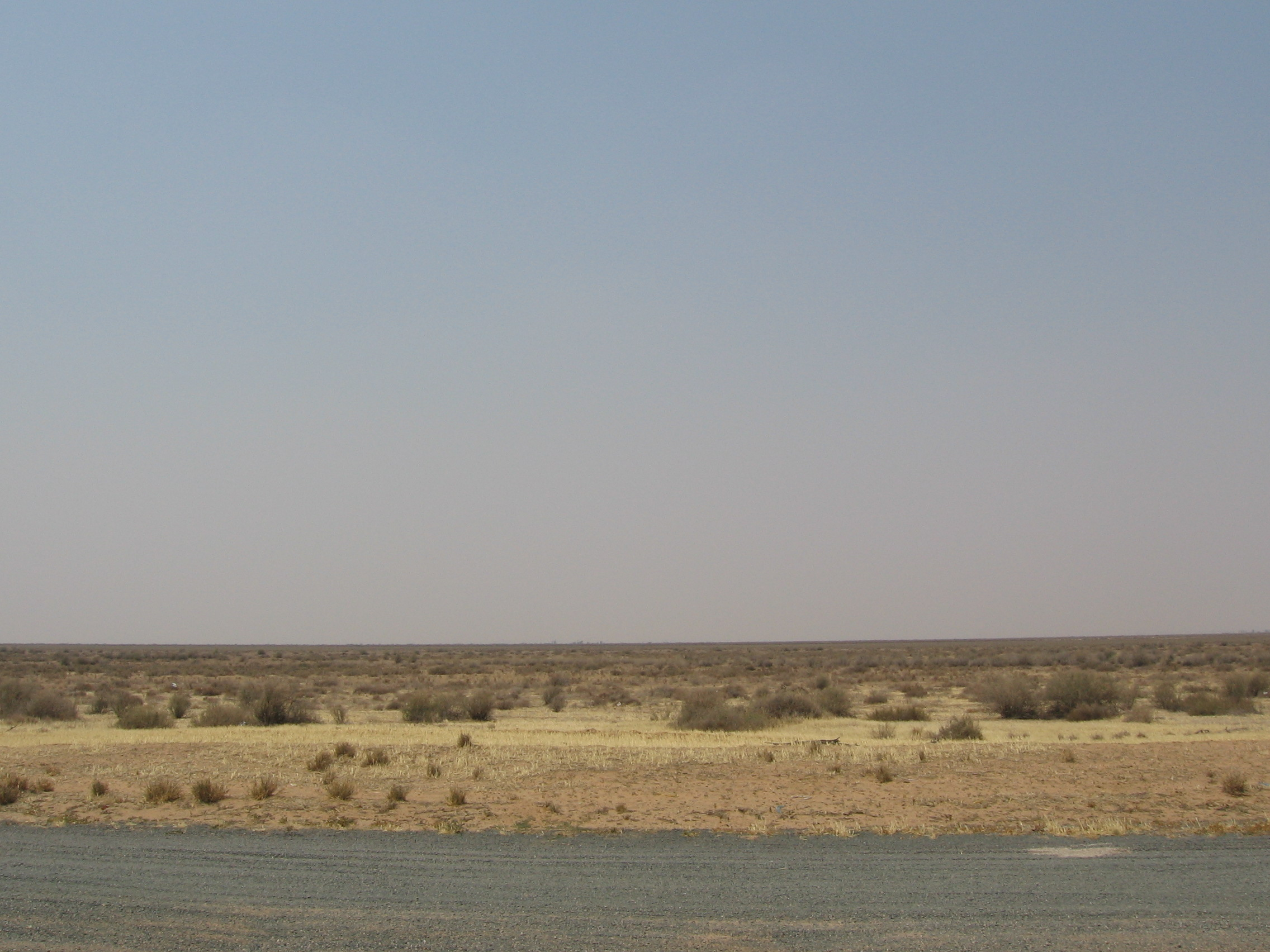
A section of the Old Man Plain, the extensive saltbush plain between Hay and Wanganella.

The Riverine Plain is an alluvial plain consisting of sediments of silt, clay and fine sand deposited by the extensive ancestral streams of the early Quaternary period (overlying more ancient granite rocks and sediments). The snow-fed Murrumbidgee River flows westwards across this plain; to the north its major tributary, the Lachlan, flows in a long arc until the two rivers join in a maze of reed-bed swamps and channels between Hay and Balranald. South of the Murrumbidgee the Billabong Creek is fed by a variety of streams, and eventually flows into the Edward River (an anabranch of the Murray River). Plant communities along the river corridors near Hay typically consist of forests dominated by river red gum (Eucalyptus camaldulensis), with Black Box trees (E. largiflorens) on the outer margins and in low-lying areas further from the river.

Away from the river Hay is surrounded by flat, mostly-treeless plains, predominately of grey clay and red earth soils. Saltbush shrublands (Atriplex sp.), with an understorey of grasses and forbs, was the dominant plant community at the time of European settlement. However severe depletion of the saltbush has occurred after years of overstocking, damage by rabbits and the broad-scale agriculture of recent decades, particularly in areas along the river and proximate to irrigation canals. The plains surrounding Hay feature a complex system of shallow creek beds and dry lakes, interspersed by wind-created sand-ridges where Cypress-pine (Callitris sp.) is often found growing.

=== Climate ===
Hay has a cold semi-arid climate (BSk) with hot, dry summers featuring clear skies and cool, partly cloudy winters. Rainfall and mean temperature records have been kept for Hay since 1877; however, extreme temperature records only from 1957 onwards. Temperature extremes are quite marked over the full year: summers are regularly over 40 °C (104 °F) while winters can see daytime temperatures below 10 °C (50 °F). The highest temperature recorded at Hay was 47.7 °C (117.9 °F) on 5 January 2013; the lowest recorded was −3.8 °C (25.2 °F) on 3 August 2014. The average annual rainfall is 368.3 millimetres (14.50 in). On the whole it is very sunny with 143.6 clear days annually.

On 24 July 1936 a flurry of snow was reported to have occurred in Hay, which if verified would be the lowest known snowfall to have ever been observed in the state of New South Wales, at just 90 metres (300 ft) above sea level, though it did not settle on the ground.

Climate data for Hay (Miller Street, 1877–2015, extremes 1957–2015); 93 m AMSL; 34.52° S, 144.85° E
Month	Jan	Feb	Mar	Apr	May	Jun	Jul	Aug	Sep	Oct	Nov	Dec	Year
Record high °C (°F)	47.7 (117.9)	47.5 (117.5)	42.0 (107.6)	37.3 (99.1)	30.0 (86.0)	25.7 (78.3)	26.0 (78.8)	30.6 (87.1)	36.4 (97.5)	39.2 (102.6)	44.9 (112.8)	45.4 (113.7)	47.7 (117.9)
Mean daily maximum °C (°F)	33.0 (91.4)	32.5 (90.5)	29.2 (84.6)	24.1 (75.4)	19.3 (66.7)	15.8 (60.4)	15.1 (59.2)	17.3 (63.1)	20.7 (69.3)	24.5 (76.1)	28.4 (83.1)	31.2 (88.2)	24.3 (75.7)
Mean daily minimum °C (°F)	16.6 (61.9)	16.5 (61.7)	13.7 (56.7)	9.9 (49.8)	6.7 (44.1)	4.5 (40.1)	3.5 (38.3)	4.6 (40.3)	6.7 (44.1)	9.5 (49.1)	12.5 (54.5)	14.9 (58.8)	10.0 (50.0)
Record low °C (°F)	5.5 (41.9)	5.3 (41.5)	4.5 (40.1)	0.7 (33.3)	−2.2 (28.0)	−3.6 (25.5)	−3.6 (25.5)	−3.8 (25.2)	−1.4 (29.5)	0.0 (32.0)	2.8 (37.0)	5.7 (42.3)	−3.8 (25.2)
Average rainfall mm (inches)	27.6 (1.09)	29.7 (1.17)	30.2 (1.19)	27.9 (1.10)	34.7 (1.37)	35.5 (1.40)	31.3 (1.23)	32.2 (1.27)	31.4 (1.24)	35.0 (1.38)	26.0 (1.02)	26.9 (1.06)	368.3 (14.50)
Average rainy days (≥ 0.2 mm)	3.6	3.4	3.9	4.5	6.3	8.0	8.6	8.5	6.7	6.2	4.6	4.1	68.4
Average afternoon relative humidity (%)	29	31	35	42	53	61	59	52	44	37	32	30	42
Source: Bureau of Meteorology

== Demographics ==
At the 2021 census, Hay township had a population of 2,882, of whom 8.3% were of indigenous origin. 80.0% of the residents of Hay are Australian-born (compared to 66.9% nationwide), 84.0% of people spoke only English at home and 41.4% of the population are 55 years of age or older (compared to 29.1% in Australia as a whole).

The most common responses for religion were Catholic 27.6%, No Religion 24.3%, Anglican 21.7% and Not stated 12.3%.

Historical population
Year	Pop.	±%
1921	2,572	—
1933	3,156	+22.7%
1947	2,963	−6.1%
1954	3,009	+1.6%
1961	3,134	+4.2%
1966	2,959	−5.6%
1971	3,208	+8.4%
1976	2,872	−10.5%
1981	2,958	+3.0%
1986	2,961	+0.1%
1991	2,817	−4.9%
1996	2,896	+2.8%
2001	2,692	−7.0%
2006	2,636	−2.1%
2011	2,298	−12.8%
2016	2,316	+0.8%
2021	2,208	−4.7%
Source: Australian Bureau of Statistics data.

== Transportation ==
Hay's railway station is the terminus of the Hay branch off the Main South Line via Yanco. However, this station is currently closed. The last passenger train ran in 1983 after 101 years of service. The goods service was closed in November 1984. The heritage listed Hay Railway Station c1882 was restored in 2005 at a cost of $1m. It features on an Australian stamp. The Dunera Museum at Hay Railway Station is housed in air conditioned carriages and has been visited by over 31,000 persons between 2002 and 2014. The Hay Internment and POW Camps Interpretive Centre housed there tells the stories of over 6,600 German, Italian, Japanese and Australian civilian Internees and Italian and Japanese POW's imprisoned there between 1940 and 1946 in three camps 6,7,8 of 1,000 men each.

Hay is accessible by the Cobb Highway, the Mid Western Highway and the Sturt Highway. Coach services are offered to Cootamundra from which train services are offered to Sydney or Melbourne, and also to Mildura. The Hay Bridge carries the Cobb Highway across the Murrumbidgee River in the town of Hay.

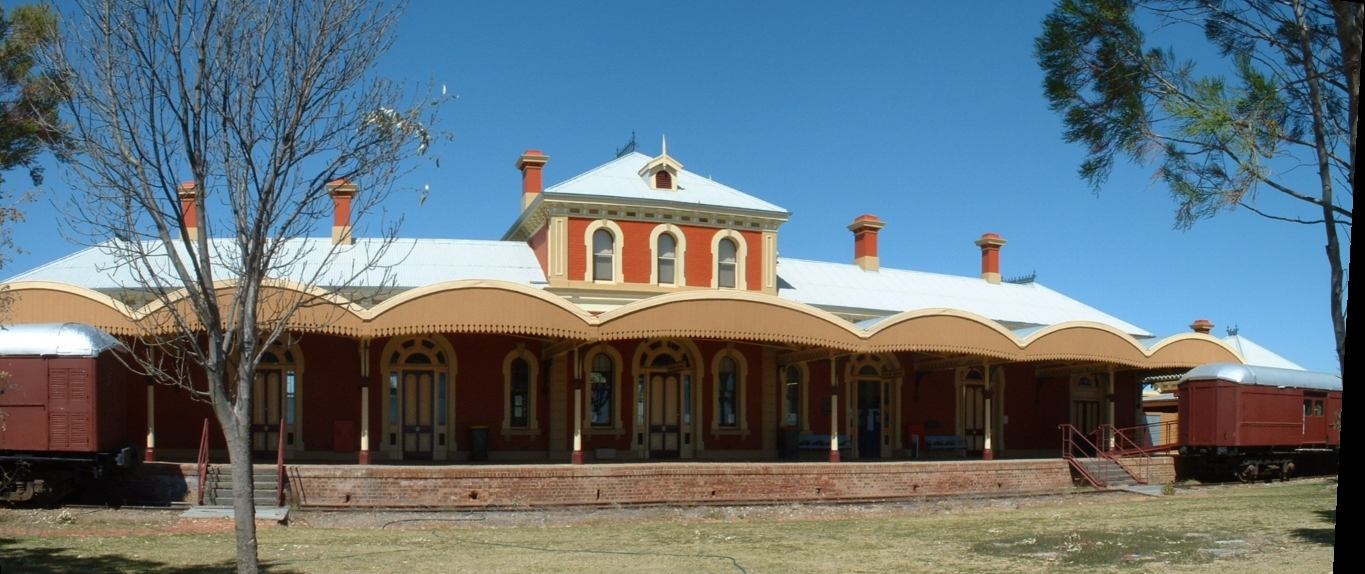
Hay Station pano

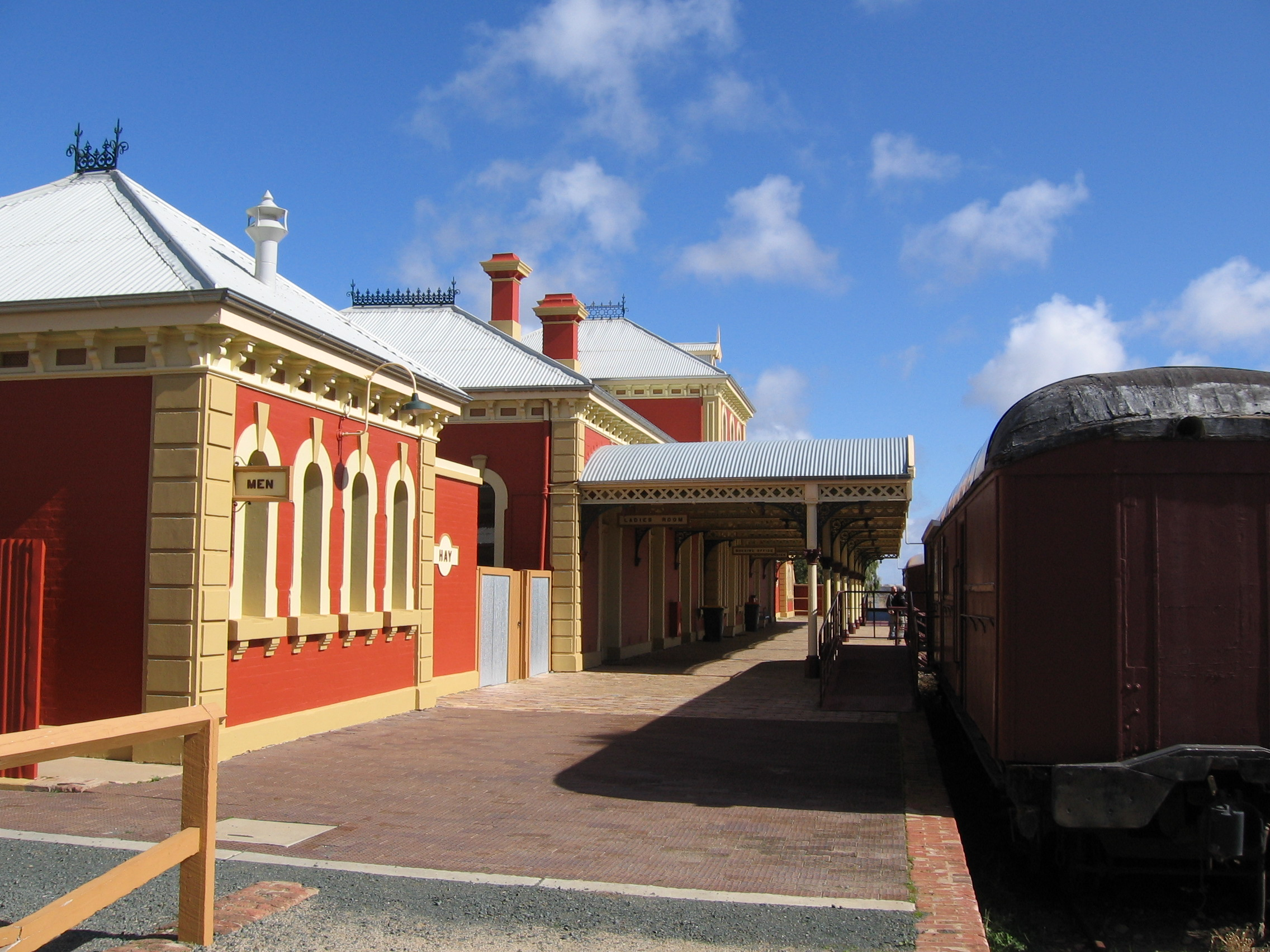
Hay Station Platform

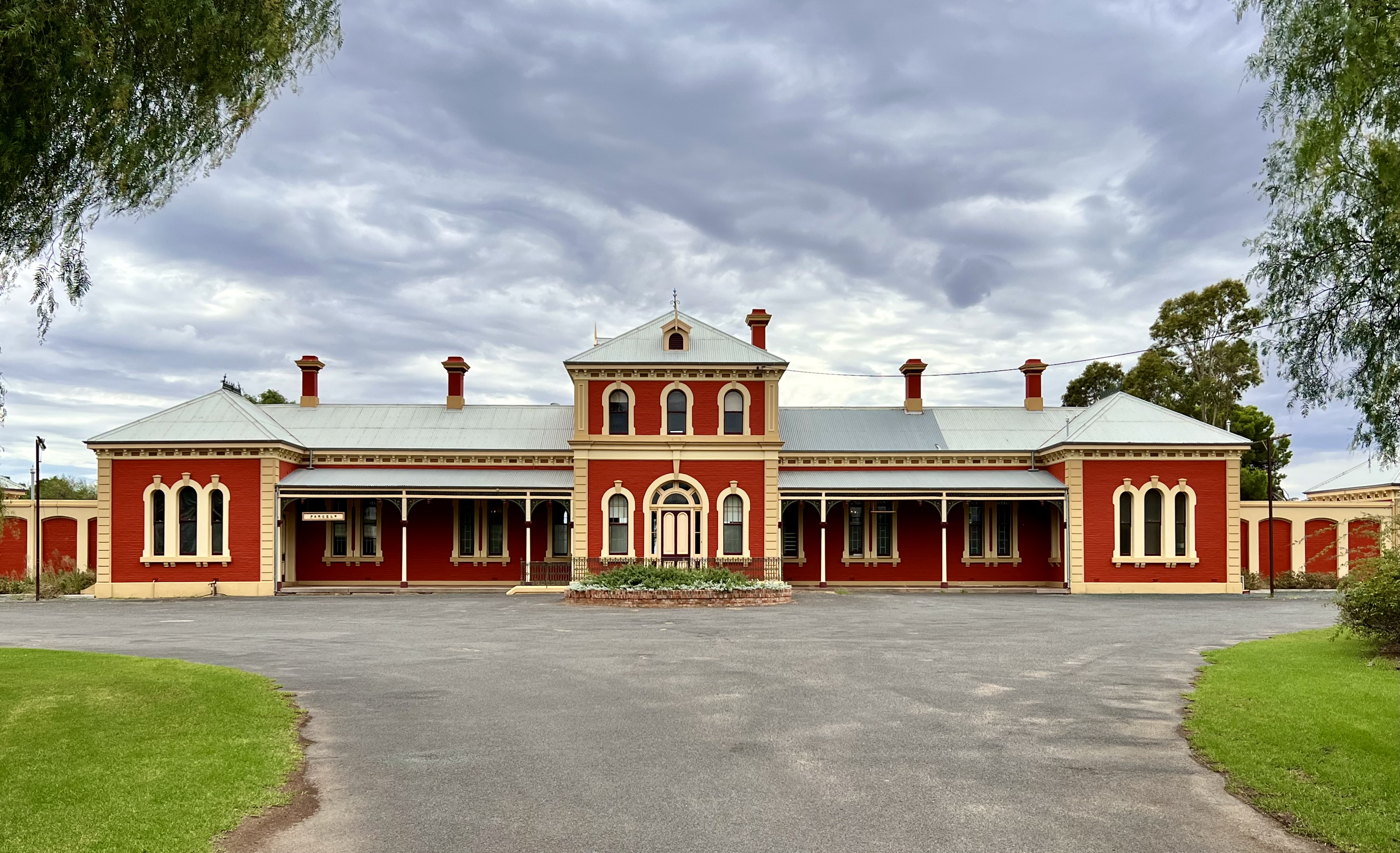

== Agriculture ==
Hay is one of Australia's leading wool growing and sheep meat producing areas, with the area home to around 26 parent studs. Cattle are also produced for sale for slaughter and, in recent years, for sale to feedlots for fattening. In irrigated areas, crops such as lettuce, pumpkins, tomatoes, garlic, corn, rockmelons, watermelons and broccoli are grown, picked and packaged in the area. Hay is also the leading producer in the Riverina of safflower, lettuce and broccoli.

In recent years, rice and cotton have been produced in Hay, so much so that the Hay Plain has colloquially become known as the Hay Paddy. While colder growing seasons have hindered the development of the cotton industry, rice production has expanded from over 400 hectares in 1991–92 to over 7,000 hectares in 1997–98, with production for the Hay district in 2002 estimated at 75,375 tonnes. A rice receival depot on the outskirts of town is capable of drying up to 32,000 tonnes of rice before delivery to the mill at Deniliquin.

== Sport ==
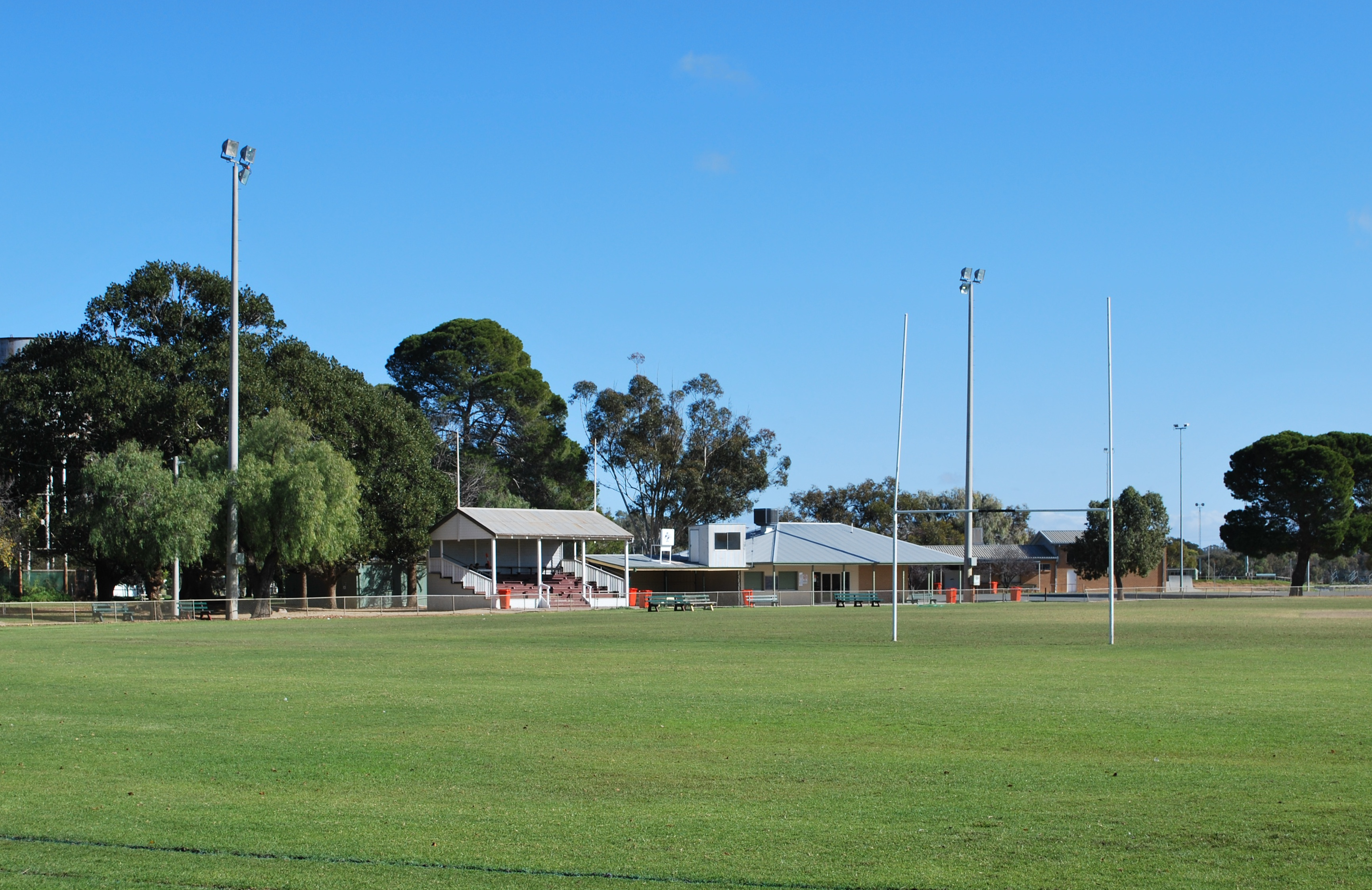
The home of the Hay Magpies, the local rugby league club

Hay, like many places in the Riverina, supports and competes in a wide variety of sport, including all major football codes.

The Hay Magpies are a Rugby league team playing in Group 20, a competition consisting of teams from towns situated in the South Western Riverina area. In the history of Group 17, the Hay Magpies won 12 premierships, more than any other team in the group. The Magpies moved into Group 20 in 2007, after the collapse of Group 17, with Hay being the only town from the former competition to survive. The competition has since returned, however Hay decided to remain in Group 20.

The local Rugby Union team is the Hay Cutters playing in the Southern Inland Rugby Union against teams from as far away as Tumut and Albury.

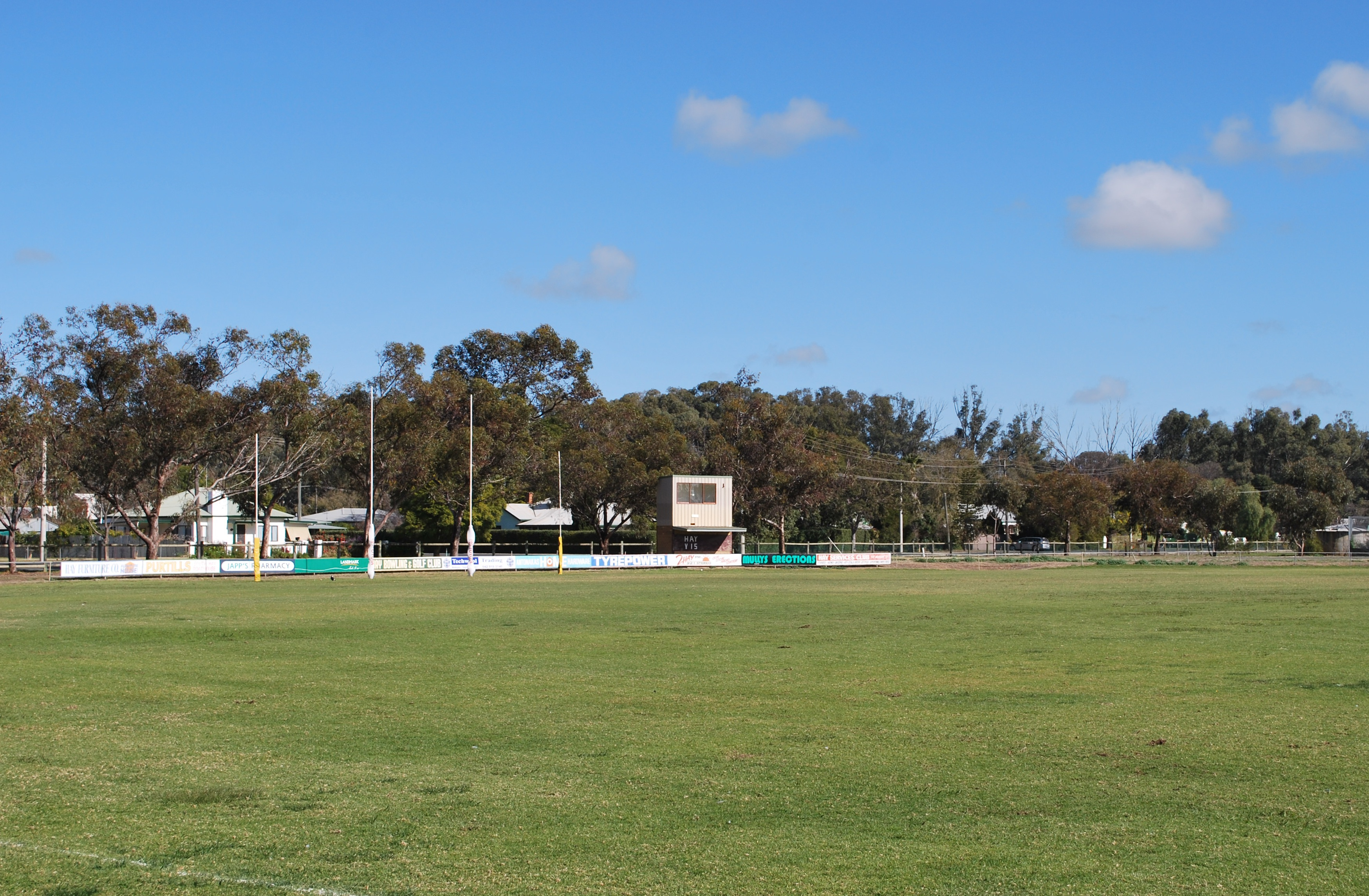
The home of the Hay Lions, the local Australian Rules football club

The Hay Lions are an Australian Rules Football club and were inaugurated on Friday, 19 May 1876. They are currently competing in the Golden Rivers Football League which consists of small towns in northern Victoria and the western Riverina.

The Hay Jockey Club runs a popular annual race meeting in November, promoted as "the biggest day in the year". Whilst the meeting is professional and supported by the TAB, it retains a "picnic races" atmosphere.

== Media ==
The Australian Broadcasting Corporation (ABC) provides a range of television and radio stations to the Hay district including ABC TV, digital television channels, ABC, ABC Family, ABC Entertains, ABC News, national radio stations, ABC Riverina, ABC Radio National. Regional broadcasters, Seven Network, WIN Television and Network 10 are the commercial television stations available in Hay. Network 10 is available from the digital signals only.

The Riverine Grazier is the local weekly newspaper, first published in 1873. The newspaper has a circulation of 5,000 and services the areas of Hay, Booligal and Ivanhoe. The Riverine Grazier is published on Wednesdays. Other daily papers from Griffith, Sydney and Melbourne are available in Hay.

2HayFM is the community radio station of Hay, broadcasting to inhabitants of the town and surrounding areas. It plays a mix of music, news and information on local matters using paid staff and volunteers. 2HayFM broadcasts on 92.1 FM with a range about 100 km around Hay.

== Film production ==
In May 2022, filming for the Mad Max film Furiosa: A Mad Max Saga took place in Hay.

== Notable people ==
- Ernest Anderson
- George Challis, rugby league player
- Jodie Hicks, Australian rules footballer
- Tom Ledwidge, Australian rules footballer
- Geoff Milliken, cricketer
- Air Marshal Warren George McDonald, senior officer in the Royal Australian Air Force.
- Rachael Pearson, Rugby league footballer
