= Geoff Milliken =

Australian cricketer (born 1964)

Personal information
- Born: 6 May 1964 (age 62); Hay, New South Wales, Australia
- Source: ESPNcricinfo, 8 January 2017

Geoff Milliken (born 6 May 1964) is an Australian former cricketer. He played fifteen first-class and two List A matches for New South Wales between 1989/90 and 1991/92.

== See also ==
- List of New South Wales representative cricketers
