= Willandra National Park =

National park in New South Wales, Australia

- IUCN category II (national park)
- Location within New South Wales
- Location: New South Wales
- Nearest city: Hillston
- Coordinates: 33°14′07″S 144°56′19″E
- Area: 193.86 km^{2} (74.85 sq mi)
- Established: May 1972
- Governing body: NSW National Parks & Wildlife Service
- Website: Official website

The Willandra National Park is a protected national park in the Far West region of New South Wales, in eastern Australia. The 19,386-hectare (47,900-acre) national park is situated approximately 580 kilometres (360 mi) west of Sydney and comprises flat grassy plain bounded to the north by Willandra Creek, which is a tributary of the Lachlan River.

== Location and regional context ==
The Willandra National Park was established in May 1972. It is relatively remote, being located about 150 kilometres (93 mi) northwest of Griffith, and 64 kilometres (40 mi) by road from Hillston. The surrounding district is used primarily for extensive grazing of sheep and cattle. Most roads in the area are unsealed and become slippery and unusable after only moderate rainfall. The climate is semi-arid, with very hot summers and cold winters. The park is situated on the northern edge of the Riverina Plain of the Murray Basin lowlands.

== History ==
Aboriginal occupation of the area is thought to date back at least 15,000 years. Willandra Creek formed a rough boundary between the Wiradjuri people to the south and the Wongaibon people to the north.

Europeans first settled the area in the 1830s. Initially this settlement was low key pastoral activity and allowed the Aboriginal people to largely continue their traditional way of living. However, during the 1870s and early 1880s extensive programs of fencing, buildings and dam construction took place as the first phase of European permanent settlement occurred. In 1894 Willandra passed into the ownership of the London Bank of Melbourne, after the entrepreneurial empire of its previous owners, the Whittingham Brothers, collapsed in the 1890s depression. Under the management of Arthur and Frank Laird during the subsequent period, Willandra became a renowned sheep property, winning many prizes for the quality of its Merino flock.

In 1912 Willandra was sold to the Vickery Partnership and was struck by drought for a period of two years immediately afterward. By 1914 the size of the flock had dropped to 10,000 sheep with larger numbers of stock having been moved from the property as the dry progressed. The Company reached its peak as a stud property in the 1920s and 1930s. Shearing numbers reached 96,943 in 1931 for a total of 3,243 bales of wool and the property area expanded to 436,000 acres (176,000 ha). A new homestead (still standing and available for accommodation) was added in 1918, along with numerous other buildings over the years. The property boasted a tennis court, a croquet lawn and orchards and was, and remains, a remarkable oasis in a typically dry and dusty landscape.

Despite high wool prices in the 1950s, Willandra had begun its decline as a prominent pastoral property, which had been exacerbated by a prolonged drought after the Second World War. In 1960 the New Zealand and Australian Land Company bought Willandra and its area shrank to 178,055 acres (72,056 ha). However, prosperity returned for a time and the property had up to 22 staff.

In 1969 Dalgety plc purchased the property, but declined to renew the pastoral leases when they expired in 1971. With the expiration of the leases, the NSW Government resumed the Crown Land grants and gazetted Willandra National Park in 1972. Subsequently, the reserve has been managed by the NSW National Parks & Wildlife Service. A major restoration program in the late 1990s restored the buildings to their former glory and a number of them are available for public accommodation.

== Heritage listings ==
Willandra National Park has a number of heritage-listed sites, including:

- Willandra Homestead

== Vegetation and wildlife ==
The park is very flat with few elevated features. For the most part it is grassland, with trees only along the watercourses and around the normally dry lakes and depressions. The low woodland is dominated by black box (Eucalyptus largiflorens) and River Cooba (Acacia stenophylla). Before European settlement saltbush, cotton bush and native grasses are likely to have been the main plant cover on the plains. However, over 100 years of grazing and some pasture improvement have modified this and the plant and animal communities do not represent the environments that existed prior to European settlement. Despite this, Willandra is important habitat for many native species, including the emu, the threatened Plains-wanderer, red and grey kangaroos, echidnas and a variety of reptiles, such as Gould's Sand Goanna and the Mulga Brown Snake.

== See also ==
- Protected areas of New South Wales
