= Roxy Theatre and Peters Greek Cafe Complex =

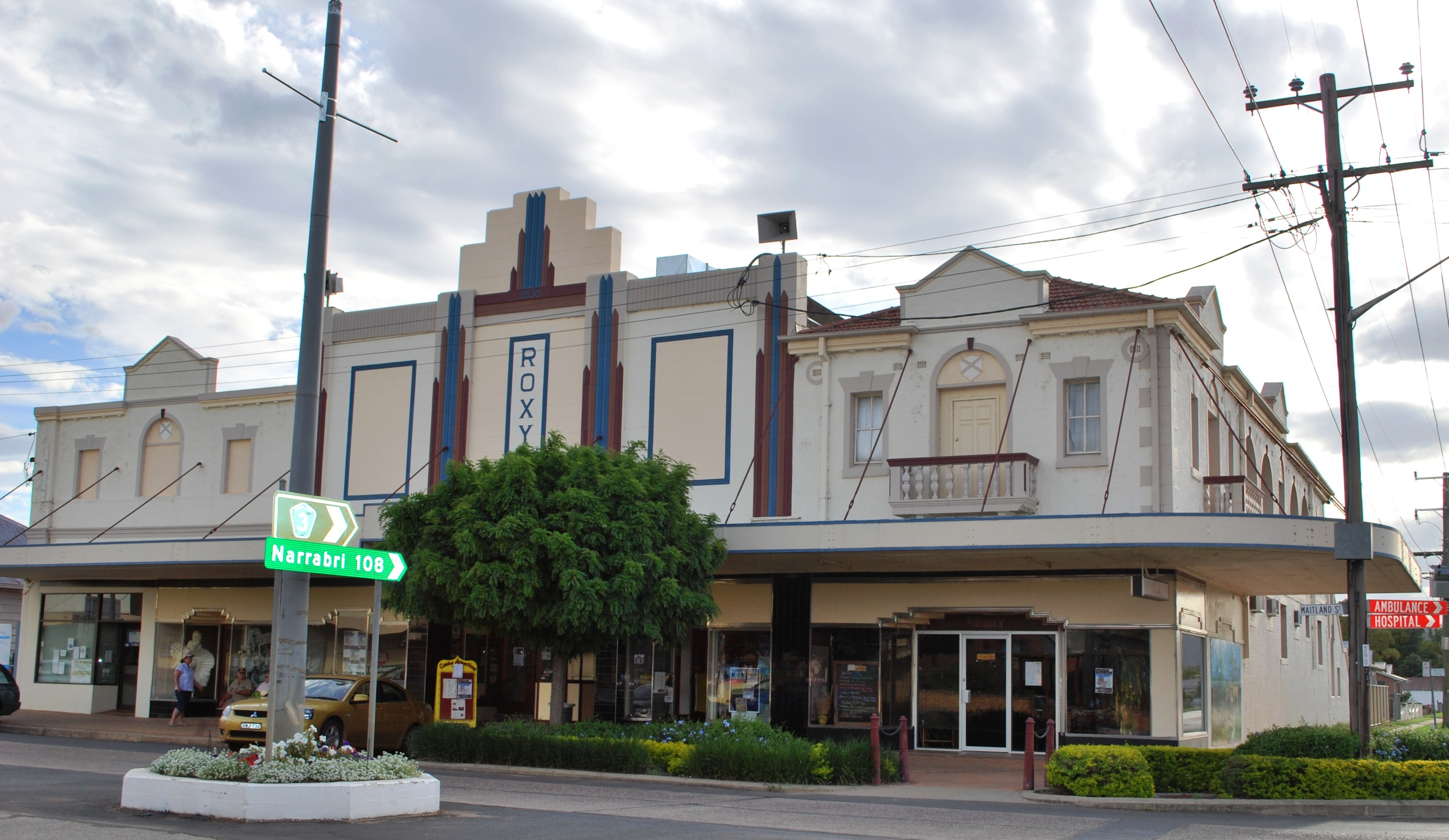

- Location within New South Wales Location within Australia
- 29.8691°S 150.5714°E
- Location: 74 Maitland Street, Bingara, Gwydir Shire, New South Wales, Australia

History
- Built: 1936–1936

Site notes
- Architect: Mark Woodforde

New South Wales Heritage Register
- Official name: Roxy Theatre and Peters Greek Cafe Complex
- Type: state heritage (complex / group)
- Designated: 25 August 2017
- Reference no.: 1990
- Type: Cinema
- Category: Recreation and Entertainment

Roxy Theatre and Peters Greek Cafe Complex is a heritage-listed theatre and cafe at 74 Maitland Street, Bingara, Gwydir Shire, New South Wales, Australia. It was designed by Mark Woodforde with construction (including significant changes to the design) supervised by George Psaltis of the Greek partnership Peters and Co. in 1935-1936 (Prineas, 2006). It was added to the New South Wales State Heritage Register on 25 August 2017.

== History ==
=== Aboriginal pre-contact and contact history ===
The land where the small northern NSW town of Bingara is now located is at about the north western extent of the traditional country of the Kamilaroi Aboriginal people. The western side of the Gwydir River was the traditional country of the Weraerai Aboriginal people. Kamilaroi hunted the abundant stock of small marsupials. They aided their hunting efforts by using fire to ensure the underbrush did not become too dense, thereby creating an open forest environment.

The first documented European exploration of the area was by botanist and explorer Allan Cunningham during his exploratory trip to the Darling Downs. Cunningham passed through the area, camping at Halls Creek where the town of Bingara is today in 1827.

By the mid-1830s the area was known as Stodderts Valley and was adequately watered by the Gwydir River and its tributaries such as Halls Creek near Bingara. Its good soils and abundant water had attracted a number of squatters who claimed runs in the nearby area. The valley land was taken up by the Hall family who already had considerable claims on land in the Hunter Valley and in the Hawkesbury.

As the squatters became more numerous and the resources of the land and cattle was contested between the Aboriginal people and the Europeans, numerous attacks occurred by both Europeans and Aboriginals. These escalated during the 1830s and culminated in one of the most renowned of the attacks, the Myall Creek massacre of 18 December 1838. A group of armed men headed by John Flemming of Mungie Bungie Station near Moree rode out to Myall Creek Station where they found and killed a group of about 30 men, women and children of the Weraerai and Kamilaroi peoples. The perpetrators were tried and eventually 7 of the 12 men involved were hanged. This was the first time the killers of Aboriginal people were executed by the Colonial Government of New South Wales.

=== Discovery of gold ===
In 1851, Gold was discovered in the Bingara area on Keera Station and a few months later at Cobidah Creek on the Bingara Run. As usual a rush of fortune seekers made their way to the area and further gold discoveries were made in 1852 leading to the proclamation of the Bingara goldfield in 1853.

=== Bingara township ===
To support the population of gold seekers the town of Bingera was surveyed and set out. By 1853, William Hall of the Bingera Run had set up the first hotel, the Bingera Inn, in Bingera. In that same year the first general store was opened. By 1862 Bingera and its population of ninety was serviced by a Post Office and law and a Watch House and Lock up was established in the town. In that year Bingera Public School was also established.

The real boom period for the town of Bingera occurred after the discovery of copper and diamonds in the area in 1872–3. During the 1880s Bingara became the largest producer of diamonds in Australia and remains one of the most successful diamond mines in Australia.

During the 1870s and 1880s the civic amenity of the town continued to grow with the establishment of a courthouse, Royal Mail Booking Office and several churches, Catholic, Church of England and Presbyterian. In addition to mining, the town supported the timber and wheat industries as well as the ongoing pastoral and agricultural industries. In 1889 Bingera was made a municipality and its name changed to Bingara. By 1891 Bingara's population was 738 and in 1911, over 1600 residents were located in the town.

Despite the impacts of the Great Depression throughout New South Wales, the 1930s proved to be a time of expansion and improvement for Bingara with Bingara Council receiving many requests to construct residences, shops, and businesses.

The list included ten applications for new dwellings, ten for additions to buildings, twelve for shops or additions to business premises, three for garages for motor sheds and on each for a picture show, a petrol depot, a bulk store, a guest house, a stable By July 1935 many new shops were being erected in Bingara, the Imperial Hotel was entirely remodelled, a new picture shoe was opened and another was in the course of construction. (Wilson, 2006.)

Wilson notes that the arrival of a number of Greek businessmen in the town, coupled with the plans to develop the Copeton Dam situated a few 55 kilometres east of Bingara may have contributed to the small boom experienced in Bingara at this time.

=== The influence of the Greeks on the spread and popularity of cinema in NSW ===
Among the "Greek businessmen" Wilson mentions were three men from the Greek island of Kythera, who were central to the story of the Roxy Cinema, Emanuel Aroney, Peter Feros (nicknamed 'Katsehamos') and George Psaltis. These men, like many Greeks at the time left their homeland to escape the difficult economic, social and political conditions in Greece in the early 20th century. However, Greeks had been coming to Australia for a century or more before this. Hugh Gichrist in his three volume history 'Australians and Greeks' (Gilchrist: 1992) notes that seven Greeks convicted of piracy by a British naval court in Malta were transported to Sydney in 1829 and two of them settled here for the rest of their lives. Peter Prineas in his book 'Wild Colonial Greeks' (Prineas: 2020) has provided evidence of a sailor from Corfu named George Manuel (or Emanuel) who arrived even earlier, in 1823, on the British brig 'Courier'. These Greeks were followed during the gold rush by a large number of their fellow countrymen and by the 1890s Greeks had established communities in all the Australian colonies. By 1899 they had built the first Greek Orthodox Church in Australia at Surry Hills in Sydney. Greeks from the island of Kythera were prominent among the early Greeks settlers in NSW and by the late 19th century they were active in the oyster industry, and then in oyster saloons and refreshment rooms, later to be known as cafes (Gilchrist: 1992). With the development of cinema, Greeks operating cafes were quick to see the importance of cinema crowds and those who could afford to do so sought to invest in and control their local cinema.

Kevin Cork in his thesis notes that around 66 Greek businessmen and women were involved in establishing and managing cinemas in NSW from 1917, when Angleo Coronis established himself as a film exhibitor in Sydney, right through to 1984 when Chris James finally retired after 38 years in the business. Some of those Greek exhibitors ran multiple theatres in several towns either simultaneously or as serial operations. Sir Nicholas Laurantus bought and built cinemas in Narrandera, Junee, Tumut, Lockhart, Cowra Hillston and Gundagai, often installing family members to run them. In fact Laurantas brother-in-law Peter Stathis and his sons ran the Montreal Theatre in Tumut from 1930 to 1965. Similarly the Hatsatouris family ran a chain of cinemas in Port Macquarie, Taree, Walcha and Laurieton. Others families such as the Notaras initially operated only one theatre, the Saraton Theatre in Grafton. They then leased out the theatre until the 1960s. Recently the Notaras family have reopened the theatre.

A survey of cinemas in NSW undertaken in 1962 indicated there were 351 enclosed cinemas in 289 NSW rural towns. Of these, between 1915 and 1960, 116 theatres in NSW were at some time operated by Greek exhibitors in 57 towns. 34 new theatres were built by Greek businessmen in those 57 towns. These figures demonstrate that the contribution of these Greek migrants to the social and cultural life of NSW was significant.

Where Greek immigrants had picture theatres they controlled their towns principal entertainment at a time when the overall population attended between 20-30 times a year. (R Thorne. 2003. Nomination to list Athenium, Junee Cinema on the State Heritage Register

They had direct input into the moral and social values of the communities in which they operated. They brought national and international events to the rural areas in the form of feature films, newsreels and documentaries. (K. Cork 1998)

The 1930s to the mid-1960s were the time for cinemas. From the early travelling cinema exhibitors. people chose to market cinema going as An exciting activity and built virtual platforms to screen Hollywood films.

in rural NSW towns platforms were built in the architectural styles of Art Deco. The elaborate and modern architecture style of these buildings gave theatre going a sense of occasion .

=== The Roxy, Bingara ===
As recorded by Peter Prineas in 'Katsehamos and the Great Idea' (Prineas: 2006) it was with this dream of wooing their audience with a sense of glamour and occasion, that Psaltis and Aroney (Feros was then absent in Kythera) began plans for the Roxy. The plans included not only a modern and luxurious new theatre and cafe, but three independent shops and also a nearby guest house where customers of the cafe and cinema living out of town could stay the night.

Soon after they arrived in Australia in the early 1920s, Peter Feros and George Psaltis decided to try their luck in the small rural town of Bingara. They formed the partnership of Peters and Co and bought an already established refreshment room in the town from a fellow Greek. They were soon joined by a third partner, Emanuel Aroney. Their business interests expanded to include another cafe in Barraba in 1930 and they successfully traded through the worst of the Great Depression on the strength of these enterprises.

By 1934 they had purchased a large corner site on Maitland and Cunningham Street and engaged a Sydney architect, W. V. E. Woodforde to draw up plans for an entertainment and retail complex. After supplying the plans - the cinema believed to be based on an art deco cinema in Sydney long since demolished - Woodforde took little further part in the development, the construction proceeding in early 1935 under the supervision of George Psaltis.

The theatre auditorium was to be 104 feet long by 40 feet wide. The floor of the auditorium provided a section of raked seating with the section nearest to the stage comprising a level floor with seating that could be taken up to reveal a specially constructed dance floor of cypress pine.

As noted by Prineas (Prineas: 2006) the build was subject to a number of alterations that involved extra time and expense. One of the alterations was to raise the auditorium walls by 4 feet 6 inches to allow for the possible later inclusion of a dress circle. This brought about changes in decorative treatments of the main ceiling and proscenium.

The progress of the Roxy development was further impeded by Victor Reginald Peacocke, the Greeks' competitor in the Bingra cinema trade, who was also the Mayor of the local council at the time. Peacocke was then making his living by showing films in a local hall. With the announcement of the plans for the Roxy, Peacocke decided to build his own new cinema in the town, 'The Regent'. He then waged a campaign that was xenophobic in tone to block the construction of the Roxy by lobbying the Chief Secretary of NSW who had charge of cinema licensing and regulation, and by using his influence in the local council which was responsible for approving the Roxy building works.

Peacocke's new Regent Theatre was a building of plain design and was completed nine months before the Roxy, giving Peacocke an advantage in establishing his audience.

When the Roxy cinema eventually opened on Saturday 28 March 1936, the local newspaper reported, "probably no event in the history of Bingara has caused more interest or excitement". It was said the crowd, "stormed the streets" and 700 people crammed the theatre, with many more unable to gain entry. Those who did get in were apparently not disappointed by the feature, which was 'Roberta' starring Fred Astaire, Ginger Rogers and Irene Dunne.

Peacock now continued his push for audience share by slashing his entry prices, which the Roxy partners had to match. He also installed an advanced sound system. In response, the Roxy partners were forced to invest in their own sound system and to engage in promotions, such as a gala "Movie Ball" to which, the local newspaper reported, "Uncle George Psaltis declares he is going as Shirley Temple and has been measured up for a special dress". Peacocke gained a further advantage over Peters and Co when he opened an open-air picture theatre at the rear of the new Regent.

But the Roxy's construction delays, the intense competition from Peacocke, and a mounting debt, had already brought the Greek partners undone. Just months after the grand opening, in August 1936, Peters & Co. were forced to enter into a deed of arrangement with their creditors under the Bankruptcy Act. The deed divested them of their ownership of the Roxy buildings. Each of the Greek partners then went his own way. Emanuel Aroney remained in Bingara managing cafes for the next 20 years. Peter Feros moved to Victoria and George Psaltis went to Sydney although returning to Bingara for a time to manage the Roxy Cafe for the new owners.

The Roxy Theatre operated as a cinema under other ownership until 1958 when it shut down. Apart from the occasional film screening and boxing match or roller disco, it lay dormant for the next 40 years.

The virtual abandonment experienced by the Roxy from the 1960s to the late 1990s was a fate shared by numerous rural suburban and city film theatres, many of which were established prior to WWII. The widespread uptake of television is given as the primary reason for the decline in cinema-going generally. As a result of this it seems that this type of building is becoming rarer in NSW country towns. In 2003 it was noted by Ross Thorne that only 31 of the 351 cinemas in rural NSW were still recognisable as cinemas. Many of these have been deployed for such diverse uses as apartment blocks, bargain centres, function centres, motor mechanic premises. Only 11 of the 31 retain their decorative interiors and exteriors. A desktop survey of remaining cinemas in country towns indicates that around only seven Interwar cinemas in rural NSW towns retain their original format and interior/exterior architectural features and decorative schemes and still operate as theatres. Of these the Roxy in Bingara is the best example of an Art Deco Cinema.

The Roxy Cafe continued to operate under a series of Greek owners until the mid-1960s when it became a freehold title and was sold to Bob and Elva Kirk who opened a memorabilia shop in the cafe, and who lived above it in the residence. It then was used as a Chinese restaurant for 20 years before being purchased by the Gwydir Shire Council in 2008.

In the early 1990s a group of community members, among them Nancy MacInnes, recognised the Roxy's significance and began to lobby the then Bingara Shire Council to purchase and restore the theatre. The Bingara Council purchased the building in 1999 and once it had been successful in obtaining both state and federal funding, set about faithfully restoring it to its former glory.

In 2006, after the Roxy's re-opening, came the publication of the book 'Katsehamos and the Great Idea' by Peter Prineas (a grandson of Peter Feros). It revealed the history of the Roxy Theatre and Cafe which was little-known up to that time. The book was launched in both Sydney and Bingara. There followed an upsurge of interest in the Bingara Roxy in the Greek community of New South Wales, and particularly among Kytherians. Large Greek-themed gatherings were held in the town with the council-appointed Roxy manager, Sandy McNaughton, and other council staff much involved in their organisation. Donations from the Kytherian Association of Australia and the Nicholas Aroney Trust, and substantial government and council grants, funded the restoration of the Roxy Cafe and the development of a Roxy Greek Museum. The museum, designed by Convergence Associates of Melbourne and curated by Peter Prineas was opened in April 2014 by the NSW Governor, the Hon Marie Bashir. In 2015 the museum was awarded first place in the level 2 category of the MAGNAs (Museum and National Gallery Awards).

Today the Roxy complex houses the local tourist information office in one of the shops and the museum, celebrating Greek history in NSW operates in another. The cafe has been leased, but in the absence of a long-term lessee, it accommodates pop-up cafes.

The theatre is in great demand as a live performance venue, a film club venue, for civic receptions, weddings and reunions. The accommodation above the cafe is a convention centre and office/storage area. At the rear of the theatre an extension to the backstage area was constructed in 2007. This was funded by the Department of Education to facilitate the local school's Theatre Studies. It was constructed by a "work for the dole" team of student workers.

In 2012 a further addition to the rear of the theatre was an industrial kitchen where trade courses in hospitality are run by the local TAFE. The kitchen allows catering for the various functions that happen at the theatre.

=== Comparisons ===
Greek cafes left a remarkable legacy on Australia's cultural history and played a significant role in the changing landscape of the region. Almost every town across rural NSW and Queensland boasted a Greek cafe. Greek family owned cafes in northern New South Wales which have closed in recent years include The Busy Bee in Gunnedah, the White Rose in Uralla, Fardouly's Cafe and Pete's Place in Inverell. Still operating are The Paragon in Katoomba and the Niagara in Gundagai, in continuous operation for over a century. The survival of a guesthouse for patrons, adjoining the Roxy Bingara (to the rear), is rare and possibly unique among surviving Greek cafes in NSW.

The Greeks really transformed Australia's culinary and cultural landscape" Mrs McNaughton said. "Prior to the Greek cafes there wasn't anywhere families could go. You could only get meals at certain hours served in the pubs and inns. If you arrived in town and it was before or after the opening and closing times of the kitchens, you literally couldn't get anything to eat.

Even during the depression, locals would make an effort to visit the cafe.

== Description ==
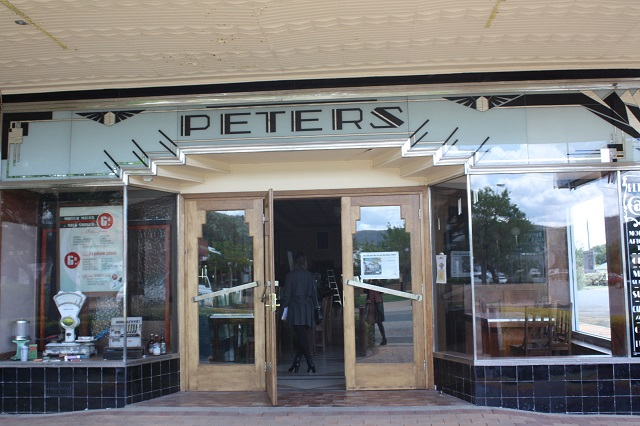
Entrance

The Roxy Theatre embraces some of the most striking original Art Deco architecture in New South Wales and it still contains the original fixtures and fittings, including the ornate stucco plaster, paintwork and coloured lights from 1936.

The theatre complex faces Maitland street and has three shops and a cafe with the theatre entrance positioned centrally. The complex as a whole is a rectangular interpretation of the Art Deco style, with a stepped silhouette, pilasters and entablature and simple panelling to break up its cement-rendered wall surface. The pilasters feature stylised low relief decorative patterns.

The two shops to the south and one shop to the north of the theatre entrance feature large chrome framed shopfronts with a recessed entry and chrome stepped art deco motif at the top of each window and entry. This stepped motif is echoed in the parapet of the theatre entrance and is picked out in the original colour scheme of white, blue, maroon and a lighter shade of maroon. The entrance to the theatre is via two timber framed glass double doors which are either side of the ticket office in the entrance portico (typical of American cinema entrances).

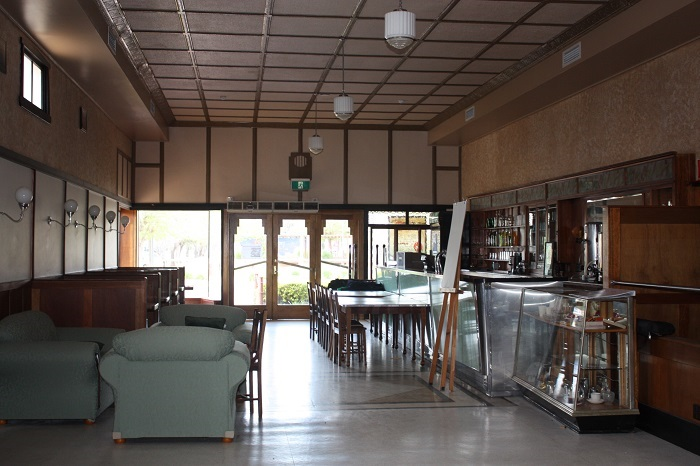
Cafe

The cafe is located to the north of the theatre on the corner of Maitland and Cunningham street. Its street entrance is a handsome set of three timber framed glass folding doors with the large chrome framed windows either side. The painted glass sign "Peter's Cafe" above the doorway is framed in the stepped chrome motif. The Maitland street facade of the complex is tiled with square black tiles. The Cunningham street side of the cafe features elements of the Interwar Spanish Mission architecture with arched windows, stucco finish and Spanish tiled roof.

Entry to the theatre auditorium is through a long, narrow vestibule. The floor here is terrazzo and the vestibule ceiling features a large stepped cornice with a decorative grille utilising a typical art deco pattern located along the centre of the ceiling. A short flight of steps leads up to the auditorium entry doors. The rear section of the auditorium is stepped and seating is fixed, whereas the front section is flat (for dances) and seating is moveable. The floor of the front section is of cypress pine and laid as a "waltz" floor to facilitate balls and dancing.

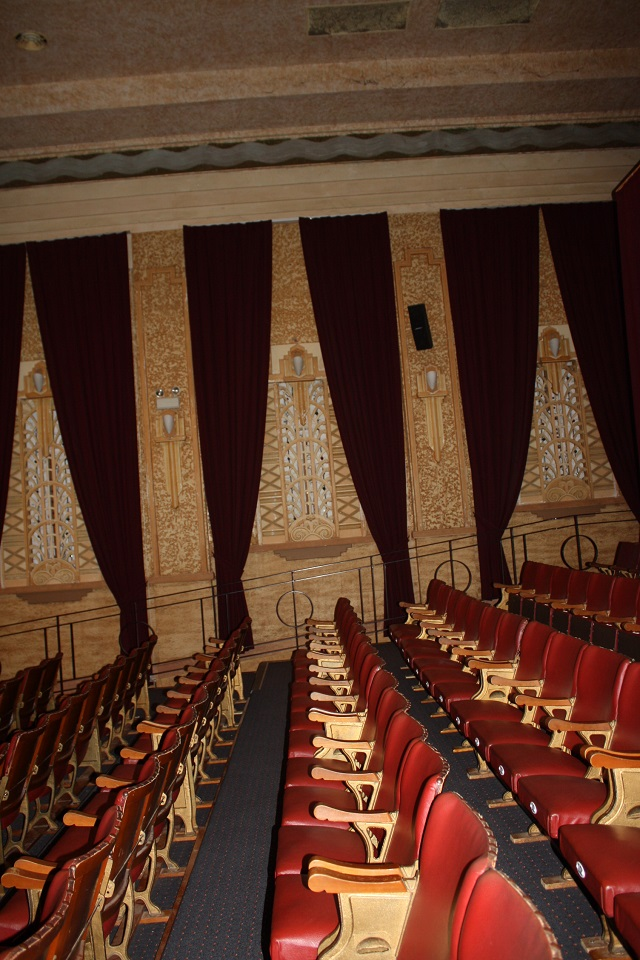
Auditorium seating

The auditorium decoration repeats the stepped motif of the facade, the ceiling stepping down to meet the walls at an entablature seemingly supported by pilasters. A wavy Art Deco frieze on the entablature and the perforated panels between the pilasters contrast with the angular theme. The wall panels comprise two elements, a central vertical row of five perforated, fan-like elements on each side of which is a vertical row of six rectangles containing diagonal strapping. The light fittings on the pilasters and proscenium splays are designed as angular vase elements. A number of these wall panels are fixed over the shuttered openings to the outside. These as well as the decorative grille running the length of the ceiling in the auditorium were incorporated as a way of ensuring air circulation and cooling in summer and were closed in winter.

The whole auditorium features a complex and pleasing original paint scheme and elements of decorative plaster. These and the lavish decorative elements assisted in giving the experience of theatre-going a sense of occasion. The theatre originally had a low stage which has been removed.

The back stage area has been slightly extended to allow for modern day use as a performance venue. An extension to the side of the theatre behind the cafe has been made to accommodate a commercial kitchen, once again to allow for the theatre to be used for a variety of uses - education facility, theatre and event function facility.

To the south of the theatre entrance vestibule is the original refreshment bar and passed that one of the original shops which has been set up as a museum celebrating Greeks in NSW. Further south is one other shop which was originally a doctor's surgery. On the northern side of the entry vestibule is the third shop which is used as an extension of the entry vestibule. Further north is Peter's Cafe which is now entered from the theatre entry by a ramp. The cafe floor is terrazzo laid in a geometric pattern and the ceiling is a plaster with timer lattice and a patterned cornice. The cafe's timber dining booths are original as is the timber wall panelling except for that alongside the disability ramp which is a fairly recent addition. While the front bar is original, some of the cafe furniture has been sourced from Fardouli's cafe in Inverell.

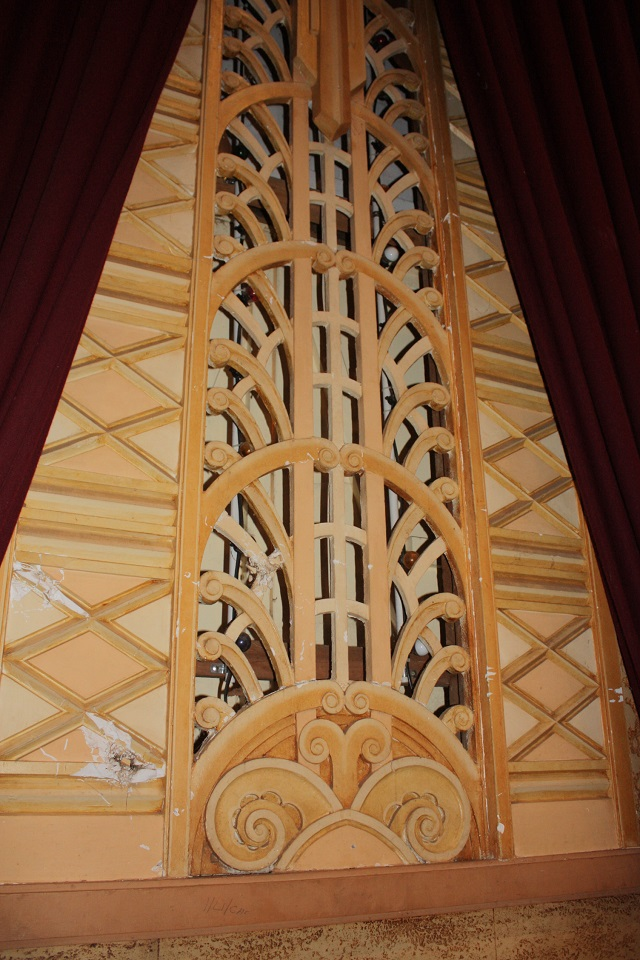
Detail

The area above the cafe was originally accommodation for those who ran it. It is now used as a conference venue. Its layout and detailing internally is unchanged and features a large living dining room with access to the outside stairway to Cunningham street. There is a small kitchenette, an office and several bedrooms and bathroom and a toilet for cafe/theatre patrons. A lift has been installed on the landing of the stairway from the ground floor. This stairway features a metal balustrade with a distinctive art deco decorative motif which is found throughout the theatre complex.

It was reported to be in good condition overall as at 31 October 2016. The roof and dance floor are in need of repair due to water damage, however this can be repaired.

The overall integrity of the building is excellent. Although there were major works done in the early 2000s these were done for functionality as a theatre, while retaining the authenticity of the building. The work carried out in the restoration was to best protect the significant fabric of the place with minimal disturbance, to ensure the culturally significant aspects of the place are respected, retained and preserved.

=== Modifications and dates ===
- 2003 Restoration of the theatre
- 2007 Extension of backstage area
- 2012 Addition of industrial kitchen wing.

== Heritage listing ==
The Roxy Theatre and Peters Greek Cafe Complex is of state significance as a rare surviving example of an Inter-War Art Deco cinema with its distinctive street presence and intact, luxurious, interior detailing and layout in country NSW. Its significance is enhanced by the fact that the Inter-War theatre still operates as a theatre and entertainment venue today. The theatre and cafe complex demonstrate the importance of "cinema going" during the first half of the 20th century in NSW towns before the advent of television. It demonstrates and records the early introduction of American pop culture into country NSW through its function-the screening of early Hollywood movies, and also through its original theatrical design and its name, which were all modelled on the world's largest showcase movie palace of the time, the original Roxy Theatre in New York of 1927.

The Roxy Theatre and Peter's Greek Cafe Complex is also of state heritage significance for its association with the story of Greek migration and settlement in country NSW in the first half of the 20th century. It is also of significance for its ability to demonstrate the architectural, technical and social aspects of cinema going during the 20th century.

The Roxy Theatre and Peter's Greek Cafe complex is a rare and representative example of an Inter-War theatre designed in the Art Deco architectural style and retaining its internal and external design and layout elements. Being a rare building of this type and still being used for its original purpose makes it a rare demonstration of the social and entertainment culture that existed prior to the introduction of television. It is one of a handful of such cinemas that survive intact today and continues to operate as a theatre and as a significant focus of the community's social and cultural life.

Internally, the Art Deco detailing of the ceiling and wall panels and proscenium create a sense of luxury and occasion for a visit to the cinema in the days prior to television.

The significance of the building is enhanced by the fact that the layout of the complex (including the shops, the theatre and adjoining cafe) remains remarkably intact with only an extension to the back stage area and the addition of a kitchen being made with sensitivity to the heritage significance of the main building.

Roxy Theatre and Peters Greek Cafe Complex was listed on the New South Wales State Heritage Register on 25 August 2017 having satisfied the following criteria.

The place is important in demonstrating the course, or pattern, of cultural or natural history in New South Wales.

The Roxy Theatre and Peter's Greek Cafe complex is of state heritage significance as it is a rare surviving example of an Inter-War Art Deco cinema in country NSW from the 1930s-the heyday of movie going. Opened in 1936, this theatre demonstrates the importance of "cinema going" during the first half of the 20th century in NSW towns before the advent of television. It also demonstrates and records the early introduction of American pop culture into country NSW by the early Hollywood movies shown for the first time in this cinema, by the building function and its original theatrical design and its name (which were all modelled on the world's largest showcase movie palace of the time, the original Roxy Theatre in New York of 1927). This early introduction of American pop culture in the form of Hollywood movies and picture theatres, provided a major new form of entertainment, communication and society to NSW communities, as well as having a significant influence on Australian tastes of the time in architecture, fashion and design generally, language, music and behaviour. The theatre is also historically important as it continues to be used as a cinema and community based theatre.

The place has a strong or special association with a person, or group of persons, of importance of cultural or natural history of New South Wales's history.

The Roxy Theatre and Peter's Greek Cafe complex may be of state heritage significance as it illustrates, through the story of Greek migrants who established the Roxy, the story of Greek immigration and settlement in country NSW and Queensland in the first half of the 20th century. This was a period when most Greeks owned, or were employed in, cafes and a considerable number owned and operated picture theatres.

The Roxy evidences and marks significant points in the journey of Greek immigrants from Greece and in their subsequent "journey" towards becoming Australians. It is also a tangible reminder of the Greek cafes and cinemas which were a "Trojan Horse" for the Americanisation of the nation's eating and social-cultural habits from the very start of the 20th century when American food-catering ideas, technology and products influenced the development of cinema and popular music, and even architectural style, in NSW.

The place is important in demonstrating aesthetic characteristics and/or a high degree of creative or technical achievement in New South Wales.

The Roxy Theatre and Peter's Greek Cafe complex is of state heritage significance as a distinctive, landmark Inter-War building designed in the Art Deco style in country NSW. Its exterior facade is finely detailed with a stepped silhouette, pilasters and entablature and simple panelling to break up its cement-rendered wall surface. The pilasters feature stylised low relief decorative patterns. Other external details include the chrome framed shopfront windows and entranceways.

Internally, the Art Deco detailing of the ceiling and wall panels and proscenium create a sense of luxury and occasion for a visit to the cinema in the days prior to television.

The significance of the building is enhanced by the fact that the layout of the complex (including the shops, the theatre and adjoining cafe) remains remarkably intact with only an extension to the back stage area and the addition of a kitchen being made with sensitivity to the heritage significance of the main building.

The place has strong or special association with a particular community or cultural group in New South Wales for social, cultural or spiritual reasons.

The Roxy Theatre and Peter's Greek Cafe complex may be of state heritage significance for its special association with the Greek Australian Kytherians as it has become a place of pilgrimage for Greeks who grew up as "cafe kids" and were a part of the Greek immigration story in Australia.

It is also locally significant for its part in the historic and contemporary community and social life, at once holding the memories and associations of those who grew up attending the cinema there and for those who are growing up now and taking advantage of the opportunities provided by the theatre including cinema going, school and community performances, weddings, reunions etc.

The place has potential to yield information that will contribute to an understanding of the cultural or natural history of New South Wales.

The Roxy Theatre and Cafe complex may be of state heritage significance for its complete and detailed demonstration of architectural, technical and social aspects of cinema going during the 20th century. The intactness of the place can also demonstrate aspects of the Greek immigration story in NSW through both the story of the establishment of the cinema and the artefacts and memorabilia on display in the museum established in the theatre complex.

The place possesses uncommon, rare or endangered aspects of the cultural or natural history of New South Wales.

The Roxy Theatre and Cafe complex may be of state heritage significance as a rare example of an Inter-War theatre designed in the Art Deco architectural style that retains its internal and external design and layout elements. Being a rare building of this type and still being used for its original purpose, makes the Roxy a rare demonstration of the social and entertainment culture that existed prior to the introduction of television.

It is also rare as a purpose built cinema of its era that is still used as a cinema and community performance venue today. It is the only known theatre still operating in NSW with its accompanying cafe and shops still in place. While a number of NSW towns still have their cinema buildings, many of them have been gutted and reused as shops, motor mechanics premises or developed as apartment buildings.

In 1951, a survey indicated that there were 351 cinemas operating in 289 country town in NSW. By 2003, the number of cinemas recognisable as such numbered 31. A desktop survey of cinemas undertaken as part of this heritage assessment indicates that, of these 31, only seven Inter-War cinemas in rural NSW towns retain their original format, interior/exterior architectural features and decorative schemes and still operate as theatres.

The place is important in demonstrating the principal characteristics of a class of cultural or natural places/environments in New South Wales.

The Roxy Theatre and Cafe complex may be of state heritage significance as a fine example of a cinema designed in the Inter-War Art Deco style in NSW. It is one of a handful of such cinemas that survive intact and continue to operate as a theatre and remain as a centre of the community's social and cultural life.
