= The Hillston News =

The Hillston News, front page, 4 November 1882

The Hillston News was a weekly English language newspaper published in Hillston, New South Wales, Australia.

== Newspaper history ==
The full masthead for the first issue of The Hillston News was The Hillston News and Euabalong, Lake Cudgellico, Booligal, Mossgiel, and Ivanhoe Advertiser. It was published Saturday 4 November 1882. The title then changed to include Mount Hope and became The Hillston News and Mount Hope, Euabalong, Lake Cudgellico, Booligal, Mossgiel, and Ivanhoe Advertiser. The final issue, ten months later, was published Saturday 8 September 1883. The proprietor was George Bridle.

== Digitisation ==
The Hillston News has been digitised as part of the Australian Newspapers Digitisation Program of the National Library of Australia.

== See also ==
- List of newspapers in Australia
- List of newspapers in New South Wales
