= Greek cafes in Queensland =

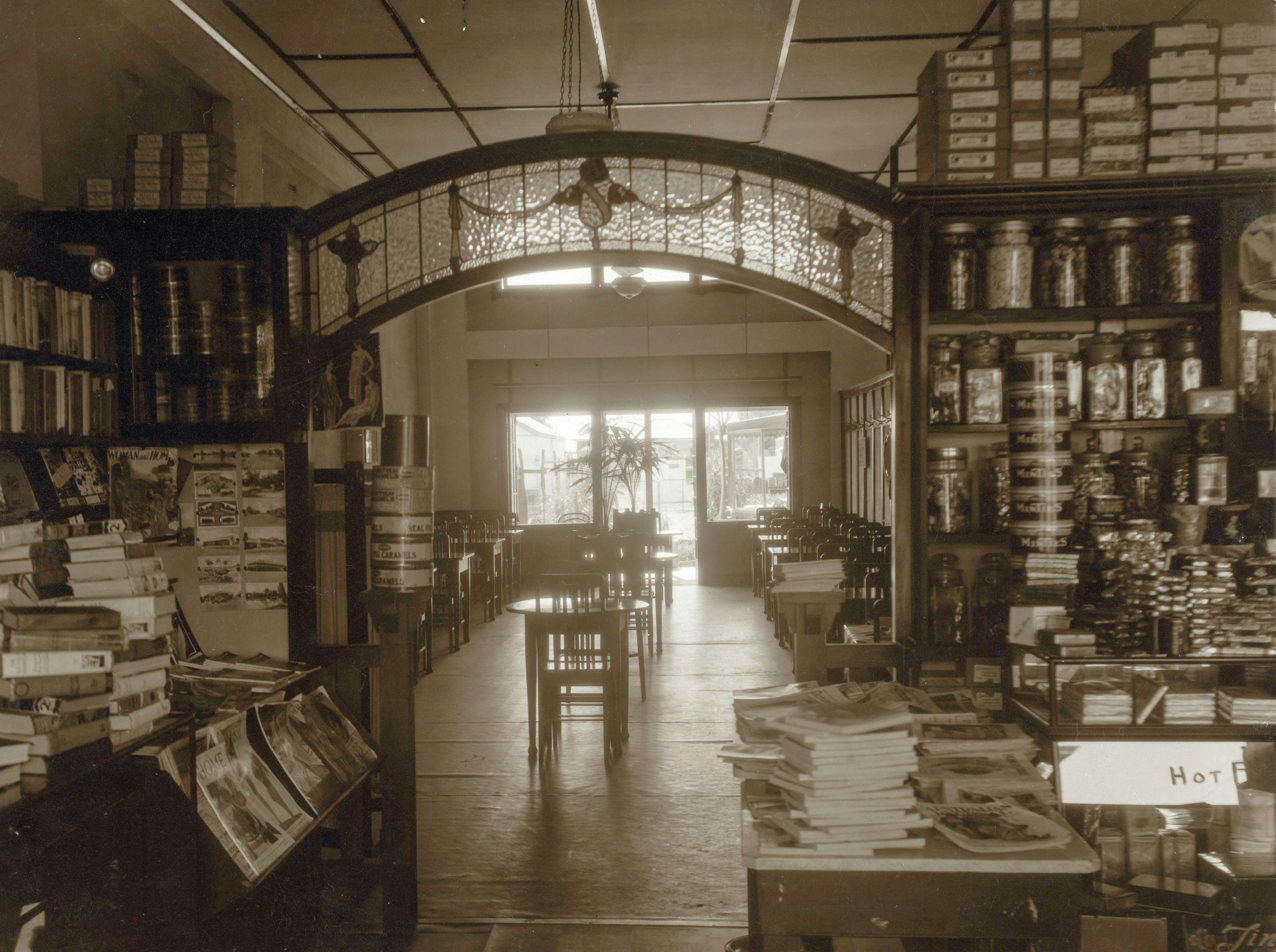
Logos Bros Central Cafe, Blackall

Greek cafés were a significant cultural phenomenon in the history of Queensland, Australia, arising from a chain migration from Greece to Australia.

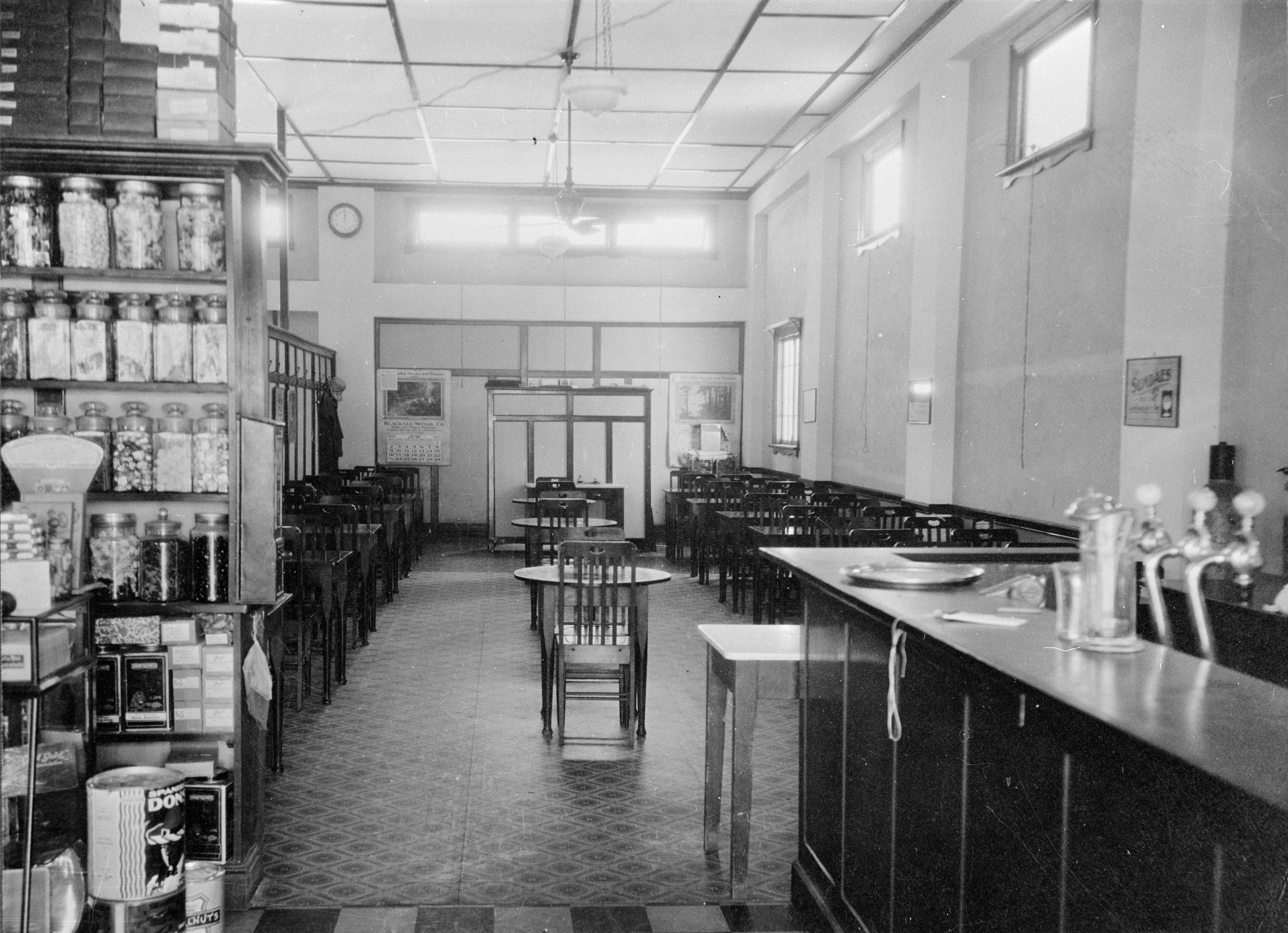
General dining room of the Logos Brother's Central Cafe at Blackall

Almost every town in Queensland had a Greek café, and as many as ten operated in larger towns like Ipswich and Toowoomba during the 1930s, 1940s and 1950s—the heyday of the Greek café. Cafés were routinely open from 7am to midnight seven days a week, meals were cheap, portions were generous, and the menu was mostly the same countrywide. They have been described as the McDonalds of their time. Although operated by Greek families, Greek food was not served in these cafes which sought to appeal to the tastes of the Anglo Australian community.

== History ==
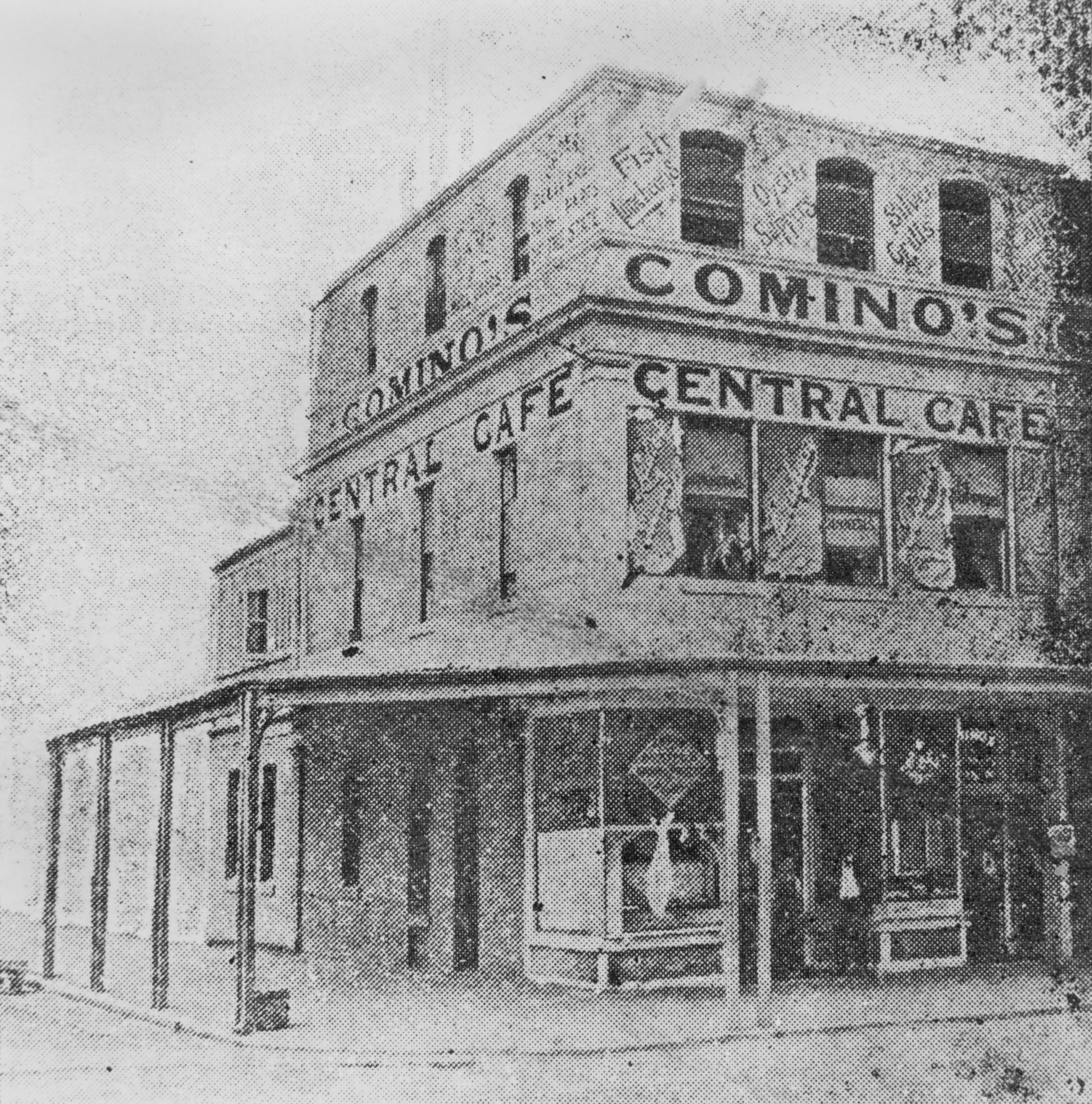
Comino's Central Cafe, Brisbane, circa 1910

The pioneer of Greek cafes in Australia was Arthur D. Comino from Kythera. He landed in Sydney in 1873 and within five years had established a small fish shop at 36 Oxford Street. When other Greek people heard cafes in Australia were doing well, it prompted others, mostly under 25 years old, to leave Kythera. The popular pattern was for Greek migrants to arrive in Sydney and earn some money working in existing Greek food establishments, before travelling to country New South Wales or Queensland to establish their own businesses.

In 1900 a Comino's Oyster Saloon/cafe was operating in Queen Street, Brisbane. After 1900 the Comino family moved into Bundaberg, Childers, Mackay, Cairns, and Emerald, making Comino cafes almost as conspicuous in Queensland as they were in New South Wales. Other Kytherians followed the Comino family into cafes in Queensland. By the 1930s there would be at least one Greek cafe in almost every Queensland town and city.

By the start of World War II over 10,000 Greeks had settled in Australia and the Kytherians, who by then constituted about 22% of the total, remained by far the dominant regional group. The largest group of pre-World War II Queensland Greeks were also from Kythera, the most significant being the Comino, Coronis and Freeleagus families. Although much larger numbers of Greeks would move to Australia after World War II, the earlier immigrants carved out a niche in Australian cultural history by giving rise to the institution of the Greek Cafe, which acted as the social hub of many country towns until the 1960s.

In 1916 a census of Australian Greeks revealed that, of the 176 Greeks in Brisbane, 140 worked in cafes and related trades. The ratio for the rest of Queensland was 168 out of 407. Other main occupations before 1920 included drapers and tailors, farmers, tradesmen, taxi drivers, cane cutters, fruit wholesalers, and travelling "picture show men". In the 1949 Queensland Alphabetical Post Office Directory, listed Comino businesses included: restaurants (10), wine sellers (1), picture theatres (1), fruit merchants (3), tobacconists (1), grocers (1), drapers (2), restaurant and draper (1), and "mixed businesses" (2).

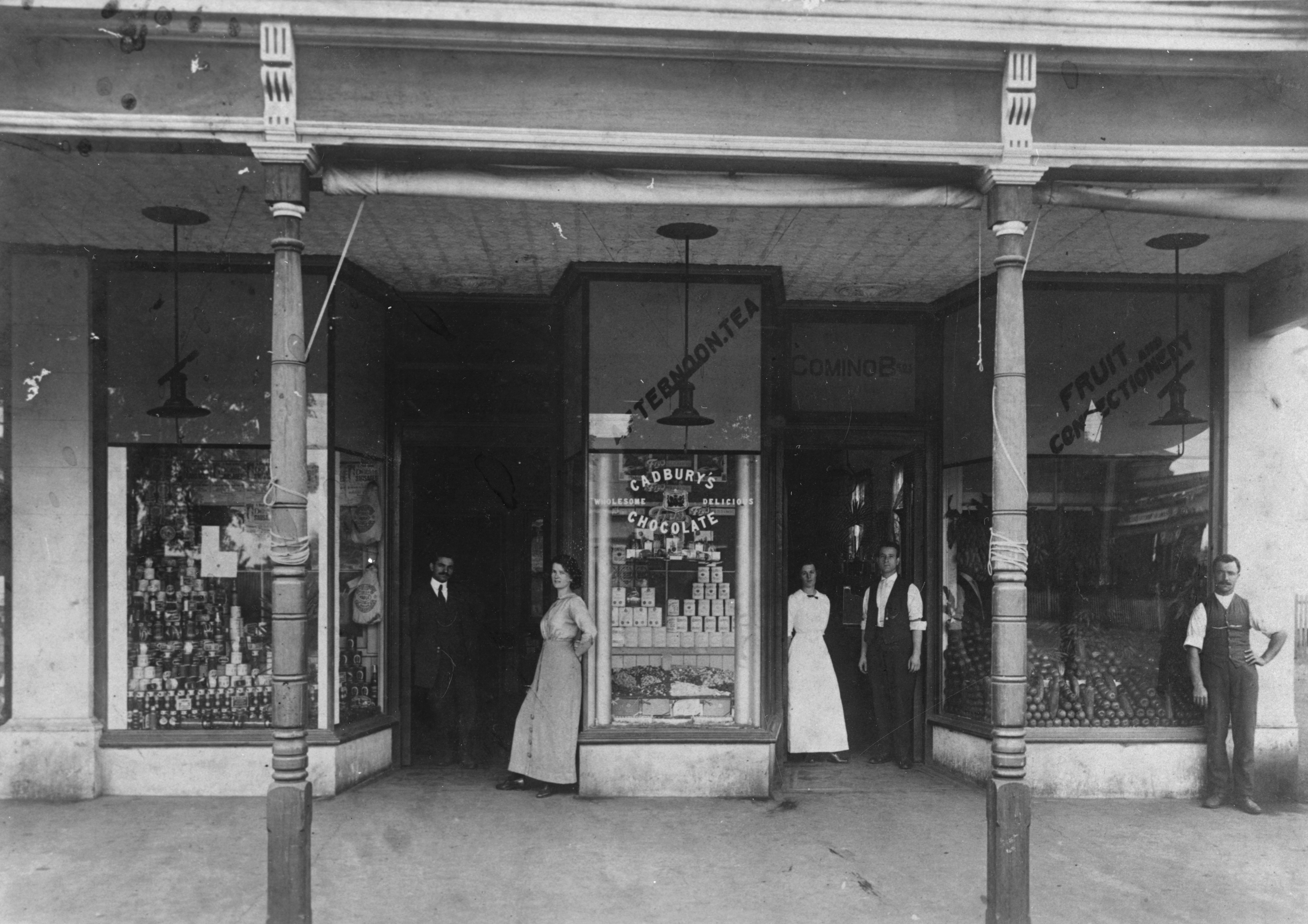
Comino Brothers Cafe and Fruiterers in Childers, Queensland, circa 1920

During the 1910s changes in cafe design occurred which produced the layout common from the 1920s to the 1960s: at the front was a display window, then a refrigerated milk bar, with pantry and confectionery counter, and then a dining room, with a kitchen at the rear. Cafes profited from the growth of the popularity of picture theatres as they fed patrons at intervals and after the show. In the country towns especially, the cafes depended on the business gained in the evening from the picture theatres.

The Great Depression in Australia caused problems for cafes, and many failed. A recovery in the late 1930s saw rebuilding and renovation occur in country cafes. Increased use was made of cubicles to separate the dining tables, and more decoration was added, as an elegant interior could be translated into increased prices. Reception halls or lounges were also added to cafes for larger functions. Greek cafes in 1930s Gympie, Innisfail, and Maryborough each had reception halls or dance floors upstairs.

== Heritage listings ==
A number of Greek cafes in Queensland are heritage-listed:

- Comino's Cafe in Redcliffe, Queensland

== See also ==
- Greek café culture in Australia
- Coffee in Greece
