= Greek café culture in Australia =

Greek café culture in Australia (Greek: Ελληνική κουλτούρα καφενείον στην Αυστραλία) is part of the shared history of Greece and Australia. For unskilled penniless Greek migrants, it was a pathway to success in which they created community hubs where Australians socialised. Greek cafés are also a singularly Australian phenomenon: the success of Arthur Comino’s fish shop in Sydney gave rise to a chain migration that saw hundreds of Greek migrants open oyster saloons across Australia by 1900.

Adapting to market changes and food trends, Greek proprietors went on to run fish shops, fruit shops, ice cream parlours, sundae shops, milk bars, snack bars, confectioneries, and cafés that dotted the Australian landscape for much of the twentieth century.

== Presence ==
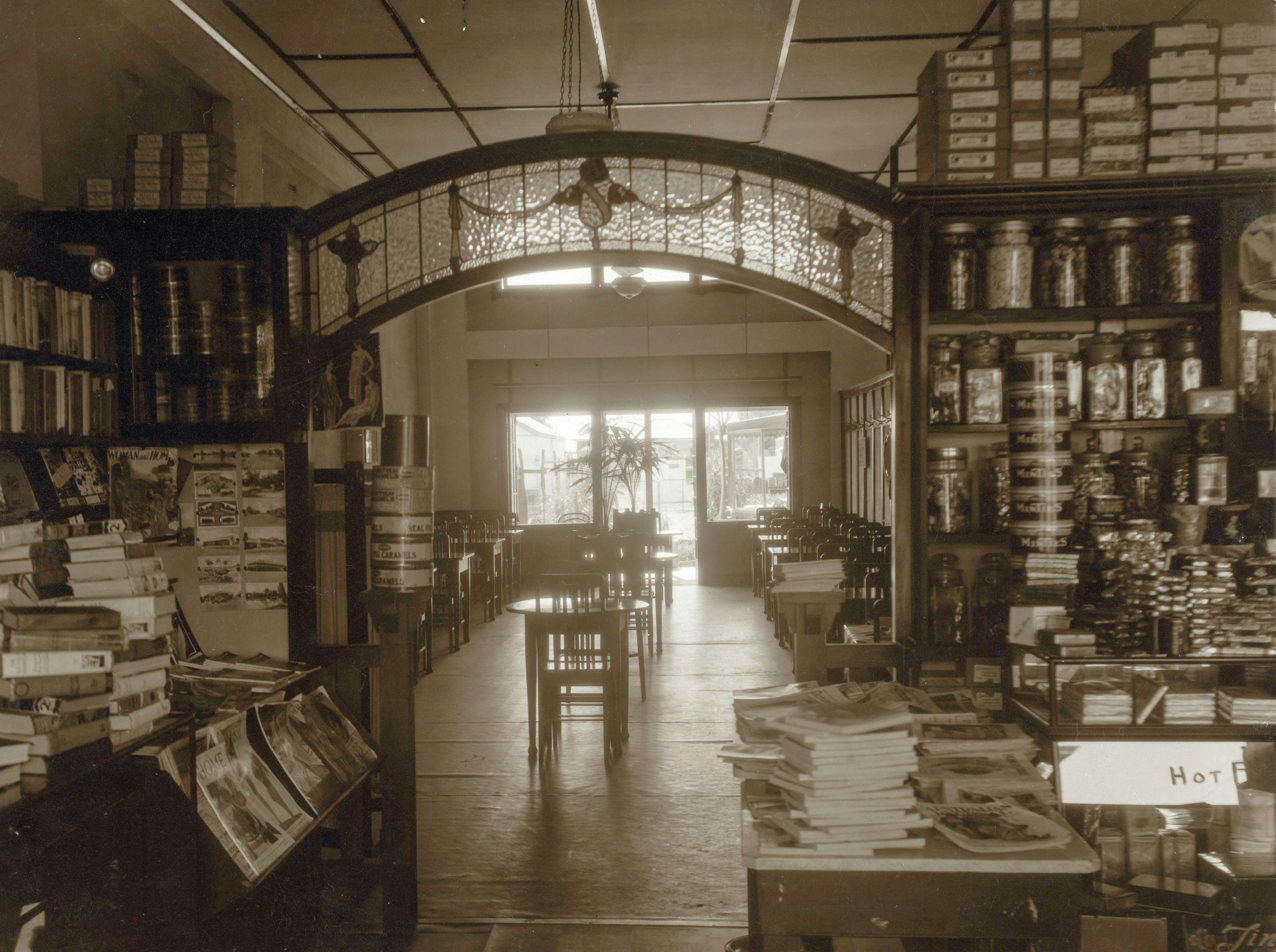
Logos Bros Central Cafe, Blackall, Queensland

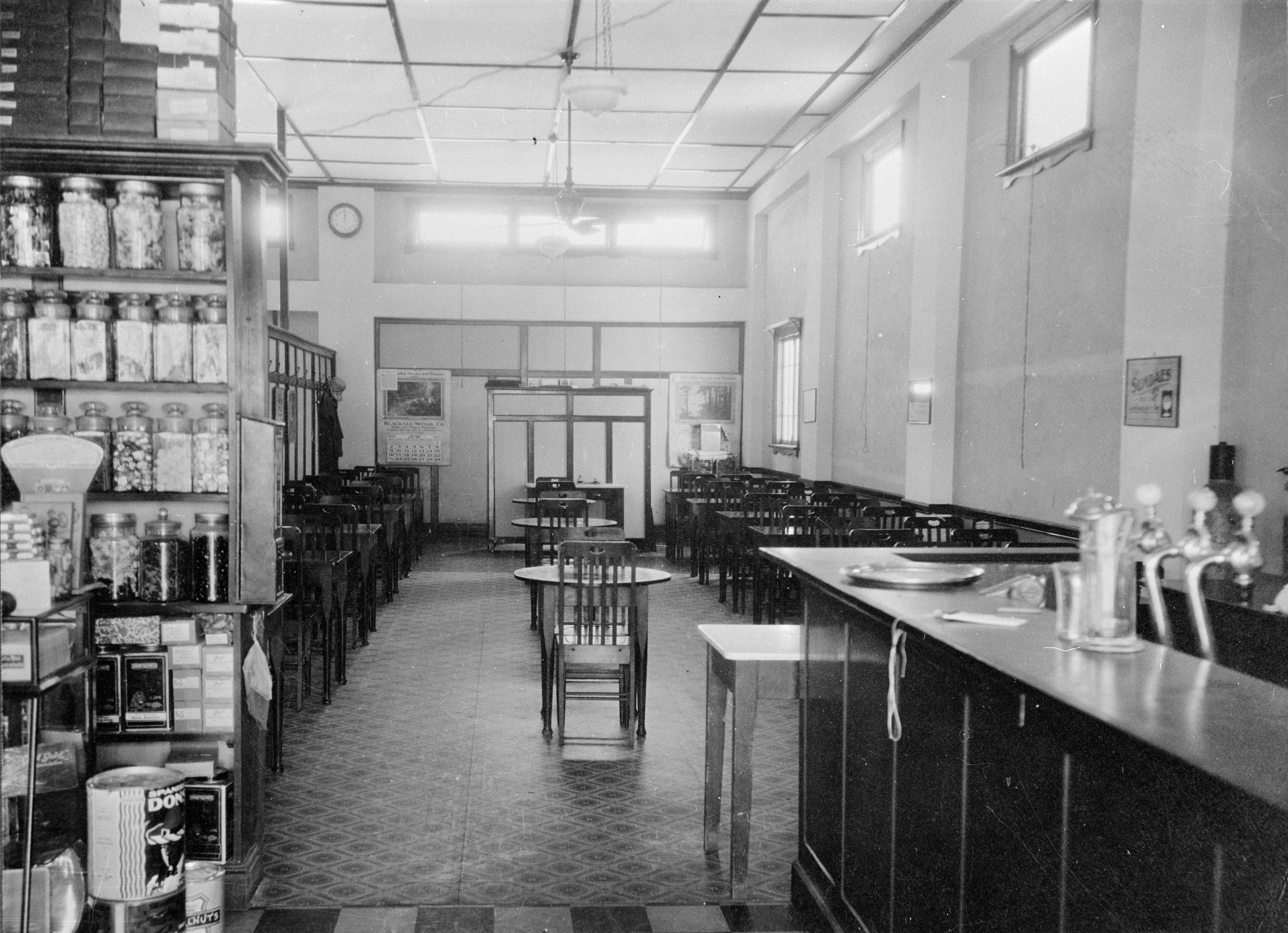
The general dining room of the Logos Brother's Central Cafe at Blackall

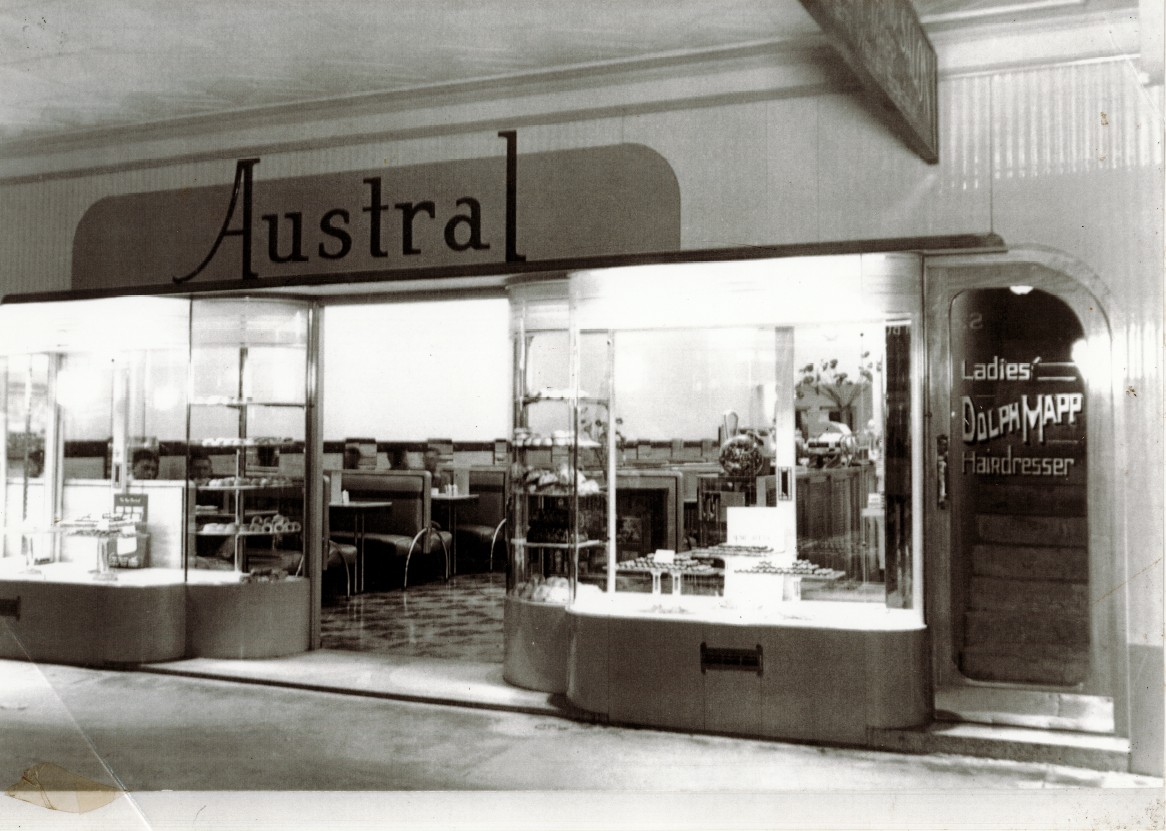
The Austral Café in Murwillumbah, operated by Con Vlismas,1939

Almost every town in Queensland, New South Wales, and country Victoria had a Greek café, and as many as ten operated in larger towns like Ipswich and Toowoomba during the 1930s, 1940s and 1950s—the heyday of the Greek café. Cafés were routinely open from 7am to midnight seven days a week, meals were cheap, portions were generous, and the menu was mostly the same countrywide. They have been described as the McDonalds of their time.

The success of the Greek café is evident in the size of some establishments, the length of time some shops operated, the enterprise and resilience demonstrated by expansion and diversification, and the extent to which subsequent generations prospered in the adopted homeland of their parents and grandparents. This occurred despite the Anglophile Australia of the first half of the century. While names like the Paragon Café suggested proprietors’ origins, and names like Niagara Café exploited the popularity of American culture, others—the Regal Café, the Australia Café, etc.—were an attempt to align businesses with Australian sentiments. Greek food was not on the menu for the same reason.

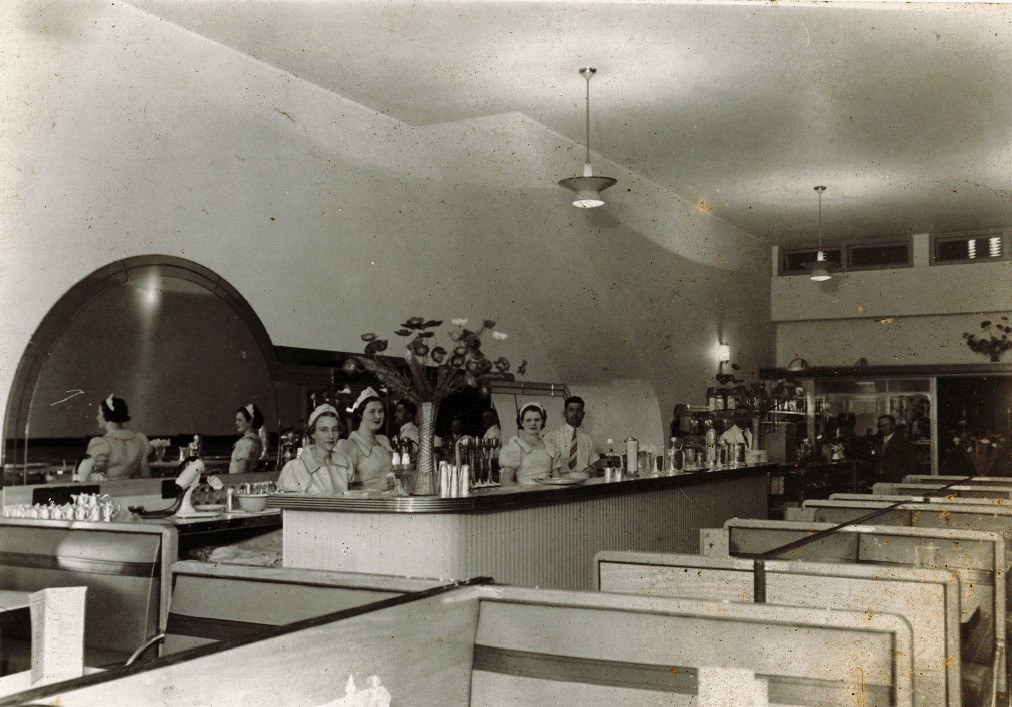
The Austral interior, circa 1948

One such café was the 'Austral Café' in Murwillumbah, New South Wales, which was opened by Cornelius Constantine (Con) Vlismas in 1919. Vlismas was born in Greece in 1885 and migrated to Australia in the early 1900s and by 1919 he was living in Murwillumbah and opened the café, first known as 'The Novelty Candy Store'. He later expanded and renamed it 'The Austral' in 1927 following his marriage to Alma Mapp. It became one of the most popular establishments in the town and was known for its milkshakes and ice cream sundaes and numerous members of the Vlismas family became involved in the business. The cafe changed locations within on the main street and number of times and was sold by the Vlismas family in 1985. As of 2026 it continues to operate under different ownership.

== Heritage listings ==
A number of Greek cafes are heritage-listed:

- Roxy Theatre and Peters Greek Cafe Complex in Bingara, New South Wales
- Paragon Cafe in Katoomba, New South Wales
- Comino's Cafe in Redcliffe, Queensland

== See also ==
- Greek cafes in Queensland
- Coffee in Greece
- Coffee culture in Australia
- Coffee culture
