= Hillston Central School =

Location
- Hillston, NSW; Australia
- Coordinates: 33°28′53″S 145°32′24″E

Information
- Type: K-12 state government
- Motto: Conserve and Cultivate
- Established: 1875
- Principal: Sandy Ryan
- Enrolment: 170
- Campus: Rural
- Colours: Blue and light blue
- Website: http://www.hillston-c.schools.nsw.edu.au
- Hillston Central School

Hillston Central School is a NSW government public school located in Hillston, New South Wales, Australia.

The local area produces citrus fruit, potatoes, cotton, wool, cattle and wheat, as well as other crops like barley and canola.

It is situated on the banks of the Lachlan River, about 110 km North-NorthWest of Griffith, approximately 650 km West of Sydney, and 600 km North of Melbourne.

Hillston is on the Kidman Way highway, the most direct route from Melbourne to North and West Queensland and Darwin.

Reconciliation Mural

== History ==
The school began in 1875 when R McKenzie opened the town’s first school in April. In 1877 the school had an enrolment of 25 students and was situated on the corner of Herrick and Byron Streets. The school was established on its current site in 1926.

Secondary education began at Hillston Central School in 1945. In 1974, the first Higher School Certificate class began, thus enabling students to complete their entire secondary education in Hillston.

The Riverina Access Partnership (RAP)

In 2000 Hillston joined the Riverina Access Partnership, with Ardlethan, Ariah Park and Barellan Central Schools. This involves lessons via video-conferencing for senior classes. In 2009 Urana and Oaklands Central Schools became involved in RAP.

Students may be taught by a teacher from another school, studying a combination of lessons via video-conferencing, lessons with a supervising teacher at their local school, and self-directed study lessons. Access classes also involve compulsory study days at one of the four schools each term.

All senior classes are part of the Access Partnership for assessment and staffing purposes. Hillston CS has 2 Access studios dedicated to video-conferencing lessons, plus a Connected Classroom and 2 Vocational Education videoconferencing facilities, Information Technology and Hospitality.
