= Hillston-Ivanhoe Spectator =

Australian newspaper

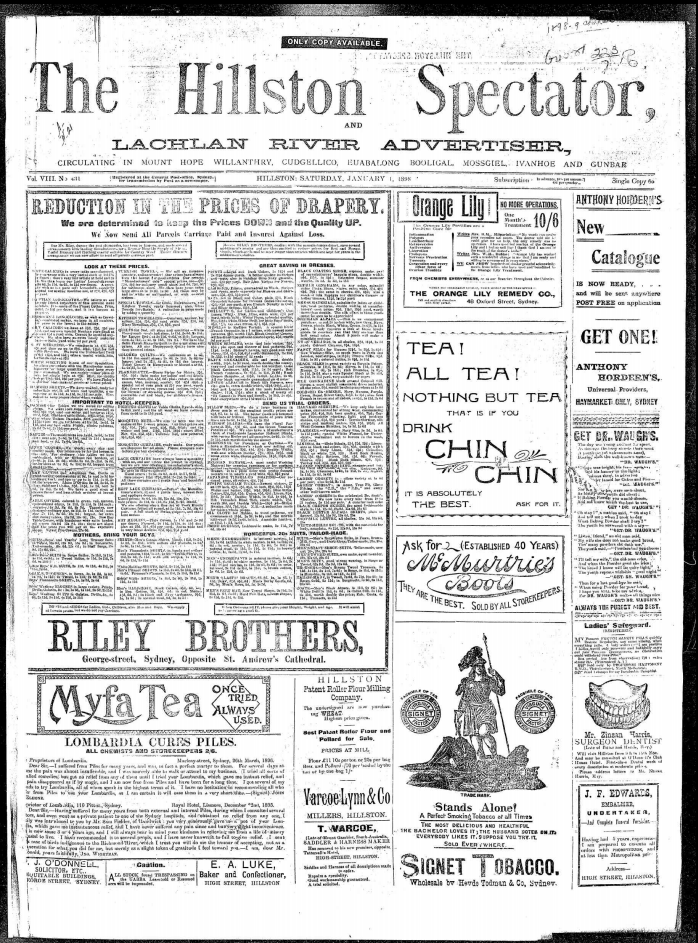
The Hillston Spectator and Lachlan River Advertiser, 1 January 1898

The Hillston-Ivanhoe Spectator is a newspaper published in Hillston, New South Wales, Australia. It has previously been published as the Hillston Spectator, The Hillston Spectator and Lachlan River Advertiser, and The Hillston Spectator and Mount Hope, Willanthry, Cudgellico, Booligal, Euabalong, Ivanhoe, Mossgiel, Gunbar and Lachlan River Advertiser.

== History ==
The Hillston Spectator and Mount Hope, Willanthry, Cudgellico, Booligal, Euabalong, Ivanhoe, Mossgiel, Gunbar and Lachlan River Advertiser was first published in 1889 by Harry Hicks and Charles August Gale. In 1953 the name was shortened to The Hillston Spectator. This was changed to the Hillston-Ivanhoe Spectator in 1997 and it continues to be published under that name.

== Digitisation ==
The paper has been digitised as part of the Australian Newspapers Digitisation Program project of the National Library of Australia.

== See also ==
- List of newspapers in Australia
- List of newspapers in New South Wales
