= Comino's Arcade =

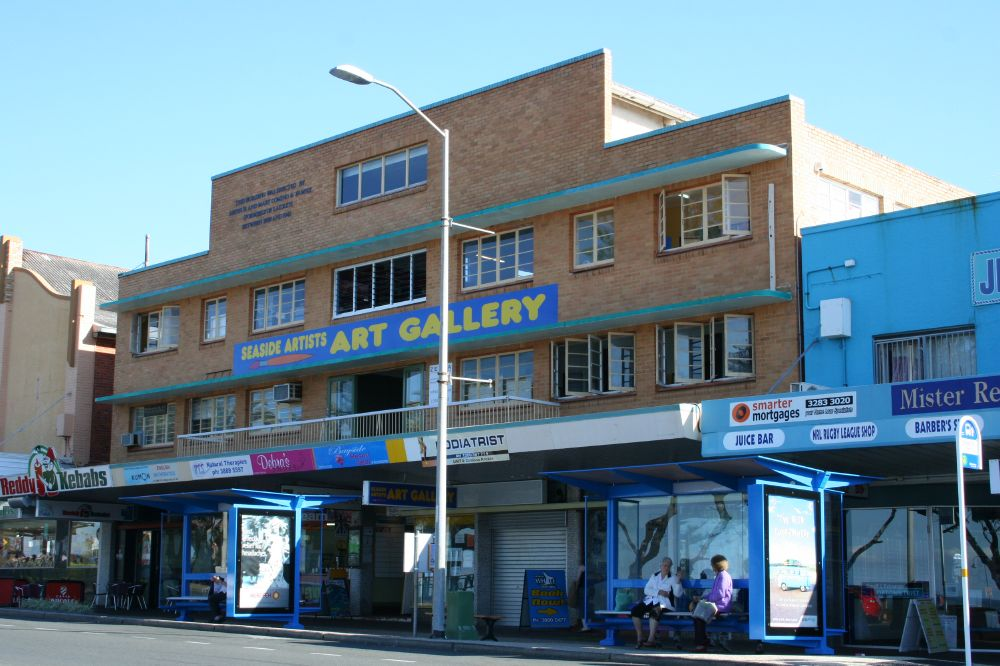
- Comino's Arcade, 2007

- Location within Queensland Location within Australia
- 27.2271°S 153.1147°E
- Location: 133–137 Redcliffe Parade, Redcliffe, City of Moreton Bay, Queensland, Australia

Queensland Heritage Register
- Official name: Comino's Arcade
- Type: state heritage (built)
- Designated: 6 March 2009
- Reference no.: 602692
- Significant period: 1940s

Comino's Arcade is a heritage-listed shopping arcade at 133–137 Redcliffe Parade, Redcliffe, City of Moreton Bay, Queensland, Australia. It was added to the Queensland Heritage Register on 6 March 2009.

== History ==
Comino's Arcade is a three storey brick building on Redcliffe Parade, built by Greek businessman Arthur Comino between 1942 and 1944 to take advantage of Redcliffe's popularity as a Rest and Recreation area for American and Australian military personnel during World War II. It is a reminder of Redcliffe's past as a popular Queensland seaside holiday resort, and its lively wartime history.

Very little development occurred in Redcliffe until the late 1870s, when publicans and shopkeepers began to cluster on the foreshores of the peninsula. The Victorians considered "taking the air" by the sea to be healthy and sea bathing was considered therapeutic. Long surf beaches were not highly valued in the Victorian period, and the ideal resort consisted of a coastline of picturesque headlands with small coves and inlets offering safe swimming in smooth water. Redcliffe fit the bill, and it was also reasonably close to Brisbane. In the 1880s agricultural portions on the peninsula were subdivided and sold as residential estates, for the building of "Marine Residences", and the area's identity as a seaside resort solidified in that decade.

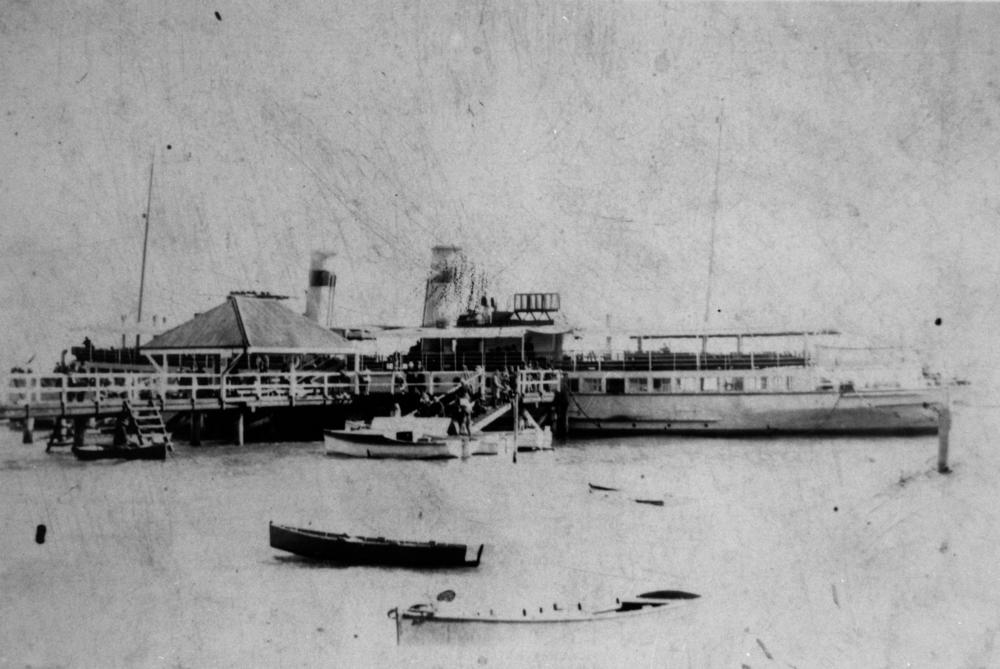
Koopa at Redcliffe jetty

Rail and sea transport were the favoured means of access for holidaymakers of this period. When the railway reached Sandgate in 1882, it was possible to take a train to Sandgate, and then catch a steamer to the Redcliffe Peninsula. In 1882 a jetty was erected at Woody Point to receive steamers from Sandgate, and another jetty was built near Redcliffe Point in 1885. By 1890 steamers were bringing 10,000 day trippers and holidaymakers to Redcliffe per year. Tourist daytrips to Redcliffe, on the steamer Koopa, started in 1911.

Until the late 1930s Redcliffe functioned as a holiday destination rather than as a residential suburb. In 1921, when the Town of Redcliffe was declared, its permanent population was only 1,631, and it contained 432 private dwellings, six Hotels, and 28 boarding houses. However, improved road access eventually changed this situation. ANZAC Avenue, running from Petrie to Redcliffe, was opened in December 1925, and in October 1935 the opening of the Hornibrook Highway Toll Bridge ended Redcliffe's isolation from Brisbane, and led to a burst of residential development. Many of the 1880s residential allotments were finally sold after the bridge was completed. Between 1933 and 1940 Redcliffe was one of fastest growing local authorities in Australia, with the number of dwellings increasing from 536 to 1865. Redcliffe's population in 1933 was 2,008, and this had risen to 6,000 by 1940.

Although Redcliffe had become a residential suburb, it continued to act as a holiday destination - at least until the spread of motor vehicle ownership, and the appeal of surf beaches on the Gold and Sunshine Coasts, lured away Brisbane holidaymakers during the 1950s. Public bathing pavilions were opened at Suttons Beach, Margate, Woody Point and Redcliffe jetty in 1937, and a koala sanctuary and zoo was established next to the Country Women's Association hall that same year. The Redcliffe Rollerdrome (a skating rink) was established in 1938, and Frost's private aviary and zoo opened in Joseph Street around 1939.

One businessman who saw potential in Redcliffe during the pre-World War II period was Athanasi (Arthur) Stavrou Comino, born on the Greek island of Kythera in 1880. His brother John S. Comino moved to Australia in 1901, and worked in Sydney and Lismore in New South Wales before moving to Queensland and buying a cafe in Bundaberg. Around 1903 John was joined by three of his brothers, including Arthur Comino. Two more brothers arrived in 1908, but in 1912 Arthur and Peter, who were still listed as Greek Army reservists, left to fight in the First Balkan War.

In 1919 Arthur married Marigoula (Mary) Comino on Kythera, and they moved back to Australia in 1921. Mary and Arthur ran the Central Cafe in Laidley for 25 years and raised their four children there. When visiting friends at Redcliffe in 1922 Arthur fell in love with the place and began looking for an investment opportunity. In September 1938 he purchased 1 rood 24 perches (1,600 m^{2}) of land on the site of the present Comino's Arcade, which at that time included the Moreton Vista boarding house. The Pier Theatre was located immediately to the south. Arthur planned to move the boarding house back from the street, and then build some shops with living quarters for the family above. However, on 26 June 1941 the Moreton Vista boarding house, the adjacent one-room Embassy fish shop, and two other shops were destroyed by an early morning fire.

Arthur Comino's presence in Redcliffe was part of the ongoing saga of the Comino family in Australia. The pioneer of Greek cafes in Australia was Arthur D. Comino from Kythera. He landed in Sydney in 1873 and within five years had established a small fish shop at 36 Oxford Street. When people heard cafes in Australia were doing well, it prompted others, mostly under 25 years old, to leave Kythera. The popular pattern was for Greek migrants to arrive in Sydney and earn some money working in existing Greek food establishments, before travelling to country New South Wales or Queensland to establish their own businesses.

In 1900 a Comino's Oyster Saloon/cafe was operating in Queen Street, Brisbane. After 1900 the Comino family moved into Bundaberg, Childers, Mackay, Cairns, and Emerald, making Comino cafes almost as conspicuous in Queensland as they were in New South Wales. Other Kytherians followed the Comino family into cafes in Queensland. By the 1930s there would be at least one Greek cafe in almost every Queensland town and city.

By the start of World War II over 10,000 Greeks had settled in Australia and the Kytherians, who by then constituted about 22% of the total, remained by far the dominant regional group. The largest group of pre-World War II Queensland Greeks were also from Kythera, the most significant being the Comino, Coronis and Freeleagus families. Although much larger numbers of Greeks would move to Australia after World War II, the earlier immigrants carved out a niche in Australian cultural history by giving rise to the institution of the Greek Cafe, which acted as the social hub of many country towns until the 1960s.

In 1916 a census of Australian Greeks revealed that, of the 176 Greeks in Brisbane, 140 worked in cafes and related trades. The ratio for the rest of Queensland was 168 out of 407. Other main occupations before 1920 included drapers and tailors, farmers, tradesmen, taxi drivers, cane cutters, fruit wholesalers, and travelling "picture show men". In the 1949 Queensland Alphabetical Post Office Directory, listed Comino businesses included: restaurants (10), wine sellers (1), picture theatres (1), fruit merchants (3), tobacconists (1), grocers (1), drapers (2), restaurant and draper (1), and "mixed businesses" (2).

During the 1910s changes in cafe design occurred which produced the layout common from the 1920s to the 1960s: at the front was a display window, then a refrigerated milk bar, with pantry and confectionery counter, and then a dining room, with a kitchen at the rear. Cafes profited from the growth of the popularity of picture theatres as they fed patrons at intervals and after the show. In the country towns especially, the cafes depended on the business gained in the evening from the picture theatres. Arthur's decision to buy land next to the Pier Theatre was probably not accidental, and Comino's Arcade was built with a cafe on its southern side, immediately adjacent to the theatre.

The Great Depression in Australia caused problems for cafes, and many failed. A recovery in the late 1930s saw rebuilding and renovation occur in country cafes. Increased use was made of cubicles to separate the dining tables, and more decoration was added, as an elegant interior could be translated into increased prices. Reception halls or lounges were also added to cafes for larger functions. Greek cafes in 1930s Gympie, Innisfail, and Maryborough each had reception halls or dance floors upstairs, and this trend is reflected in Comino's Arcade at Redcliffe, which was built with a dance floor on the third storey.

Throughout World War II many cafes were forced to close or drastically curtail their business due to rationing, quotas, and loss of staff into the armed services. Conversely, those cafes located near where soldiers - particularly Americans - were camped or stationed did very well.

During World War II Redcliffe's attractions were well patronised by military personnel on Rest and Recreation leave, due to the large numbers of American and Australian troops stationed on or near the Redcliffe peninsula. They were present as part of the defence of Moreton Bay and the Brisbane region, which was an important supply and staging area for the Allied war effort against the Japanese. Military facilities on the peninsula by November 1942 included a Royal Australian Air Force Rifle Range at Scarborough, an Australian Army jungle camping area, amphibious unit, rest area, and Bren Gun Carrier unit near Redcliffe, and an Australian Army bayonet and rifle drilling area at Margate. Seabrae Guesthouse, opposite the site of Luna Park, was used by Australian Military Intelligence as a training school from September 1942, and after June 1943 it was used by United States Navy submariners on Rest and Recreation. The American Red Cross also billeted United States Army soldiers at the Scarborough Hotel from 1943.

During the war other facilities in the area around Redcliffe included an army camp and three airstrips at Strathpine, Australian machine gunners at Deception Bay, United States and Australian troops on Bribie and Moreton Islands and at Caloundra, and amphibious warfare training facilities at Toorbul Point. The jetty at Redcliffe was so heavily used by United States Navy and Royal Australian Navy vessels, such as Landing Ships (Tank), and Corvettes, that it required repairs after the war.

The Australian Comforts Fund was set up January 1940 for people serving in the military, and in 1941 its focus shifted from cakes and knitting for the troops to entertainment. The Redcliffe Australian Comforts Fund became a centre for the whole of the surrounding area. The Pier Theatre, Luna Park (established in August 1944 on the site of the current salt water lagoon), and the Redcliffe Rollerdrome were all popular components of what was a seaside entertainment precinct near the Redcliffe jetty.

With the armed forces swarming over Redcliffe, Arthur Comino was in a good position to capitalise on the situation. After Moreton Vista burned down he planned an entirely new building for the site, and his plans were ambitious for the time. From February 1942 National Security Regulations restricted civilian building, although it was possible to get a permit if construction was linked to the war effort. The construction of government buildings and private housing effectively ceased. However, Arthur arranged for a letter to be delivered by the Chairman of the Laidley Shire Council to Sir Arthur Fadden whilst the latter was campaigning in his Darling Downs electorate during his brief time as Prime Minister of Australia, from late August to early October 1941. The letter requested permission to rebuild Comino's boarding house and this request was granted.

War-related material and labour shortages made construction of the present arcade a drawn-out business. As Arthur was a stonemason, like his father and uncles, he used this experience to build the arcade. The Redcliffe Town Council checked the plans and requested changes in September 1941. Arthur began building in 1942, supervising the project and building substantial portions himself and it was not until 1944 that the shops were completed. The building itself bears lettering that claims it was built between 1939 and 1942, but this does not correspond with the 1941 destruction by fire of the previous buildings on the site.

Architects G Meek and Shaw were commissioned to plan the arcade. A conceptual drawing shows a two storey building with porthole windows on the sides and part of the first floor, glass fronted shops on the ground floor, a glass arcade cupola, and a tower in the form of a "flying bridge" on top of the second storey. The building was called "Lockyer Private Hotel" in the drawing, the name probably relating to Comino's cafe at Laidley in the Lockyer Valley. Commenting on the design, the Redcliffe Herald noted that the bridge and port holes imparted a marine appearance to a building which was much suitable for a seaside resort. However, during construction a third storey was added, which removed the flying bridge and the glass arcade ceiling.

The finished building, of brick and reinforced concrete with terrazzo and tiled floors throughout, had an arcade and shops on the ground floor. The four shops along the street frontage initially included a cafe, a dress shop, a casket agency and a photographer, and there was a hairdresser within the arcade: Joan Haycock, who was first listed in the Post Office Directory at Marine Parade (later Redcliffe Parade) in 1947. Mr Cassimatis ran the casket agency. The "Arcade Drapery...Cominos Arcade", was first listed in the Post Office Directory in 1949.

The first floor contained the family's flat along with serviced bedrooms, and the second floor contained more serviced bedrooms, set around a ballroom with a terrazzo floor. The provision of holiday accommodation was consistent with Redcliffe's history as a seaside resort, and the building was effectively a combination of a boarding house, an arcade, and a Greek cafe with an associated ballroom. Initially the building was named the Acropolis Building. During the war the cafe was packed with service personnel and soon after opening Arthur built the kitchen and was able to provide meals. The family moved into the first floor flat in 1946, having sold their cafe in Laidley.

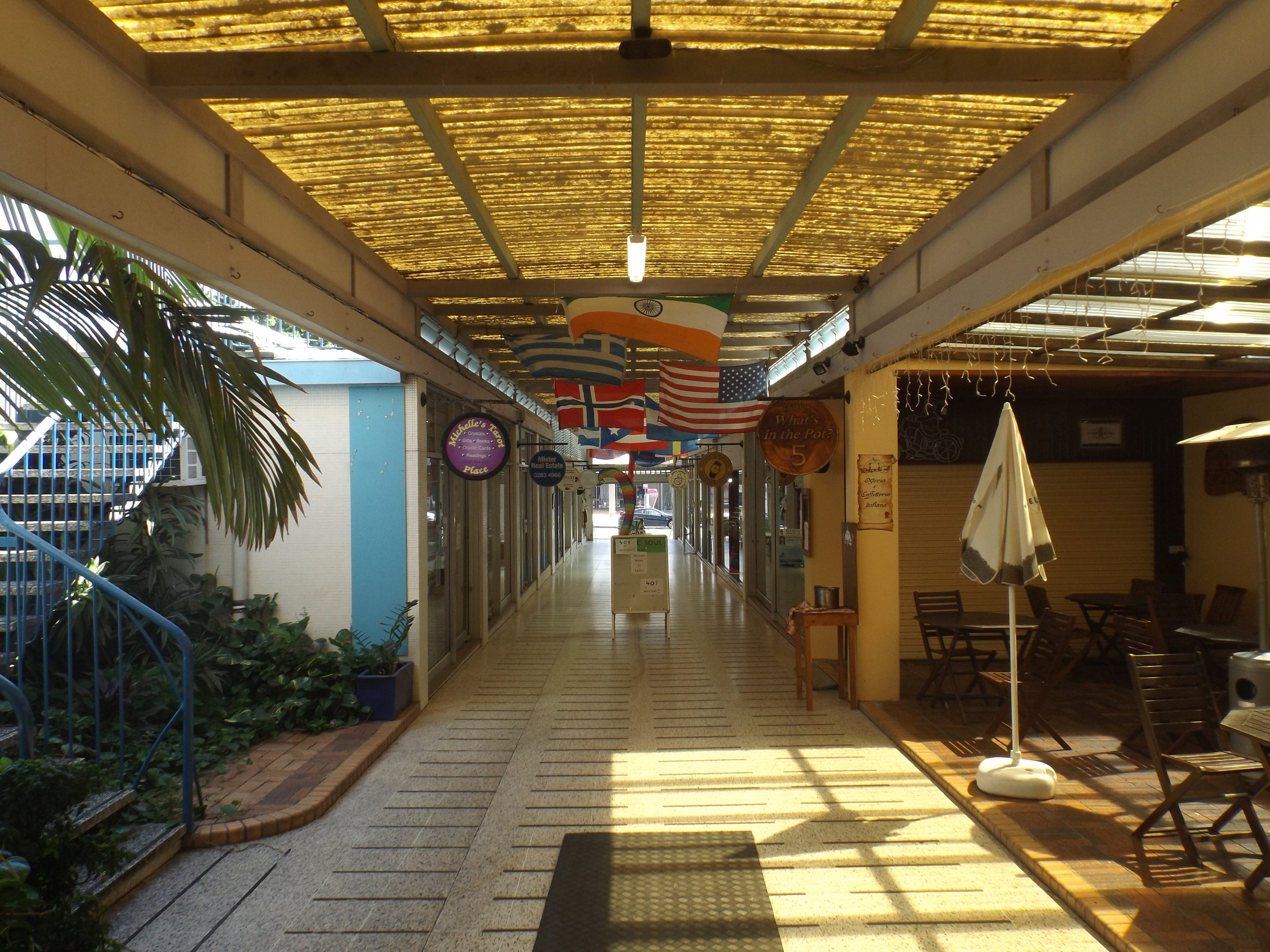
The rear extension was completed in 1968 and is not part of the heritage listing

In December 1946 Redcliffe's first nightclub, "The Ace of Clubs", was opened in the ballroom by Bob and May Borradale. A 1949 advertisement for the arcade touted the "Panorama Dance Palais" for weddings, dances and parties. The Acropoly Cafe and Milk Bar was also advertised, along with "modern flats and rooms". The bedrooms were later rented as offices. Tragically Arthur died in December 1949 as a result of a fall from a ladder while working on his arcade. From 1975 until 1982 the ballroom was leased to the Redcliffe Art Society. The arcade's extension through to Sutton Street, designed by Colin Tannett and erected by local builder Jim Fortune, was finished in 1968 and was officially opened by the Post-Master General, the Federal Member for Petrie, Alan Hulme. Members of the Comino family jointly owned the original arcade until 2003.

== Description ==
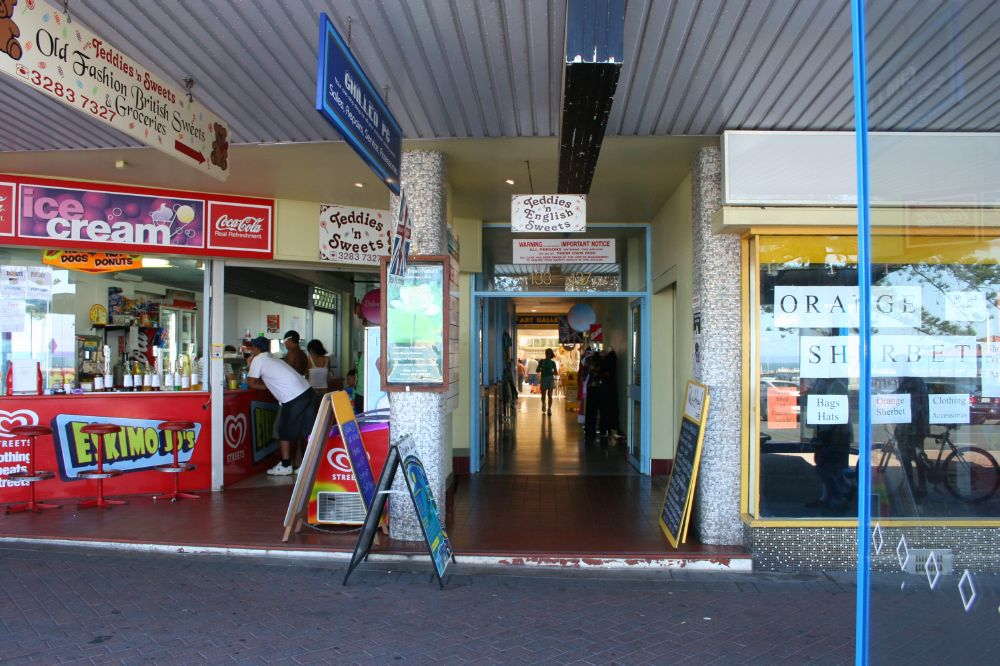
Street entrance, 2008

Comino's Arcade is located within the beach-facing shopping strip along Redcliffe Parade and overlooks Queen's Beach and the Redcliffe jetty. The three storey face-brick building incorporates a shopping arcade on the ground floor, office suites on the second floor and a double-height ballroom with small bedroom spaces on the upper floor. The arcade's wide, three-storey frontage contrasts with the low-lying beach opposite and to the other smaller scaled buildings along the Redcliffe Parade shopping strip making the building a prominent part of the streetscape.

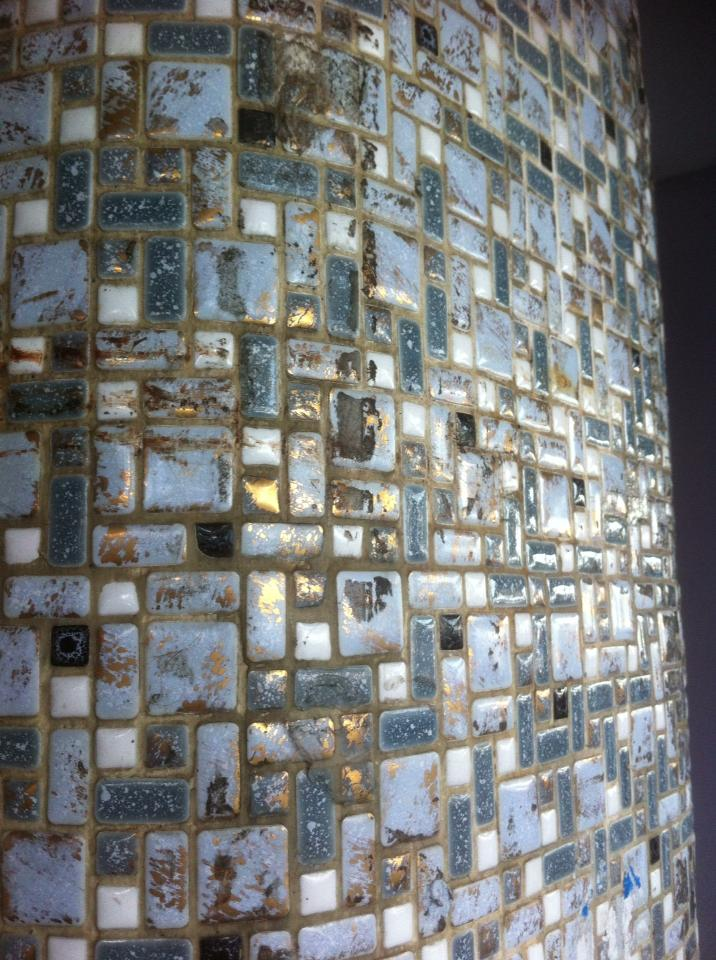
Mosaic tiling on the shopfronts, Redcliffe, 2013

The building is symmetrical in form and features functionalist-style influences such as the simple stepped facade of face brick, the use of casement windows and the fine concrete cantilevered window awnings running the width of the building. The Redcliffe Parade facade steps up at parapet level to conceal the hipped roof of the ballroom space beyond which is clad in "super-6" profiled fibre-cement sheeting. Timber-framed doors open out to a centrally-placed balcony on the second level above the cantilevered street awning.

There are four shop tenancies at ground level adjacent to the entrance to the arcade. Columns on this level are finished with terrazzo and some early mosaic tiling exists on one of the shopfronts. The underside of the street awning and a portion of the original shop-front glazing have been sealed with trim-deck sheeting.

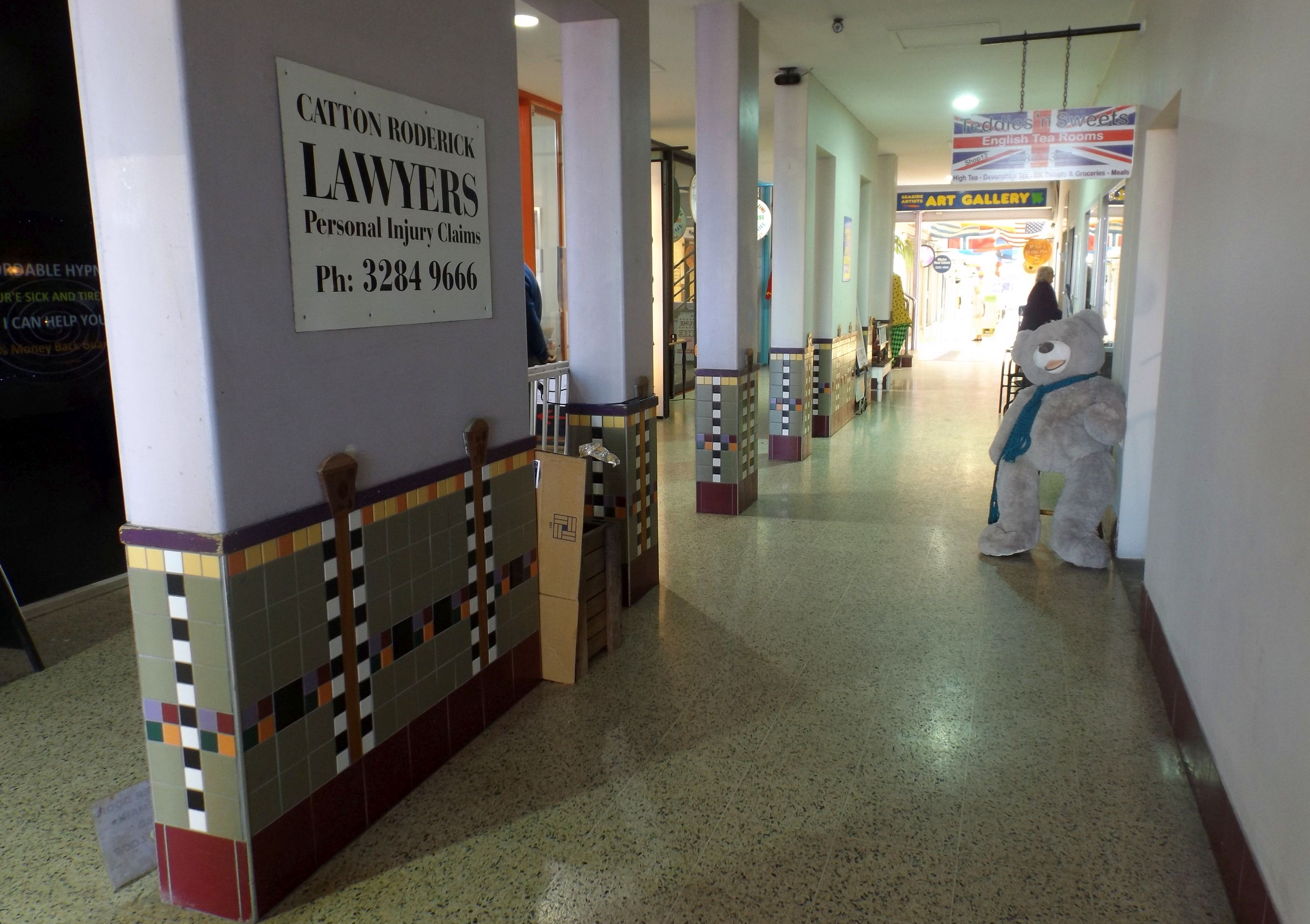
Columns within the arcade, 2016

Side elevations of the building are finished with face-brick with fibre-cement cladding to the enclosed verandahs which run along the northern and southern sides of the ballroom level. The rear elevation is also finished with face brick and steps up at parapet level similar to the street facade. Both the side and rear elevations contain casement windows with high-level louvre windows to the ballroom space on the upper floor. Double doors open out to a small landing on the second level.

The arcade provides public passage through the building on ground level and internal facades are symmetrical in layout with full-height glazing to the shopfronts. Ceilings and walls are finished with painted plaster with sandy-coloured terrazzo to the floors.

Public spaces on the second and upper levels are reached by a masonry staircase at the rear of the building. Rooms throughout the second and upper floor levels floors and stairs have been finished in colourful terrazzo tiles with a checkered border detail and walls and ceiling have been finished with painted plaster. Internal doors and windows are clear-finished timber joinery. The ballroom space features a fibre-cement ceiling and wall-mounted, half-moon shaped uplight fittings.

A 1968 rear arcade extension links Comino's Arcade to Sutton Street. This extension is not part of the listing.

== Heritage listing ==
Comino's Arcade was listed on the Queensland Heritage Register on 6 March 2009 having satisfied the following criteria.

The place is important in demonstrating the evolution or pattern of Queensland's history.

Comino's Arcade is important in demonstrating the development of the hospitality and retail industries in Queensland in the first half of the twentieth century, particularly in a seaside setting, and it also demonstrates Redcliffe's role as a major seaside resort from the 1880s to the 1950s. It is an important example of a 1940s seaside tourist and entertainment venue offering a cafe, shops, dance hall and serviced accommodation in close proximity to a range of other popular entertainment venues. An ambitious civilian building project for its time, the building also illustrates the importance of Redcliffe as a Rest and Recreation centre for troops during World War II. The owner's intention to create a durable, high quality building is shown by the intact joinery in the accommodation areas, and by the original terrazzo and ceramic tile floor finishes throughout the building. In addition, Comino's Arcade is a product of the chain migration of Greeks from the island of Kythera into Queensland during the first half of the twentieth century; a migration which influenced the evolution of the hospitality industry in Queensland.

Comino's Arcade is also important in demonstrating the adoption of modernist architectural design principles - principles that were almost universally adopted in post-war architecture. Some of the building's features, uncommon in its time - such as its stark face brick street elevation, its undecorated parapet, and its cantilevered concrete window shades - were to become standard in the 1950s and 1960s.
