= Willandra Homestead =

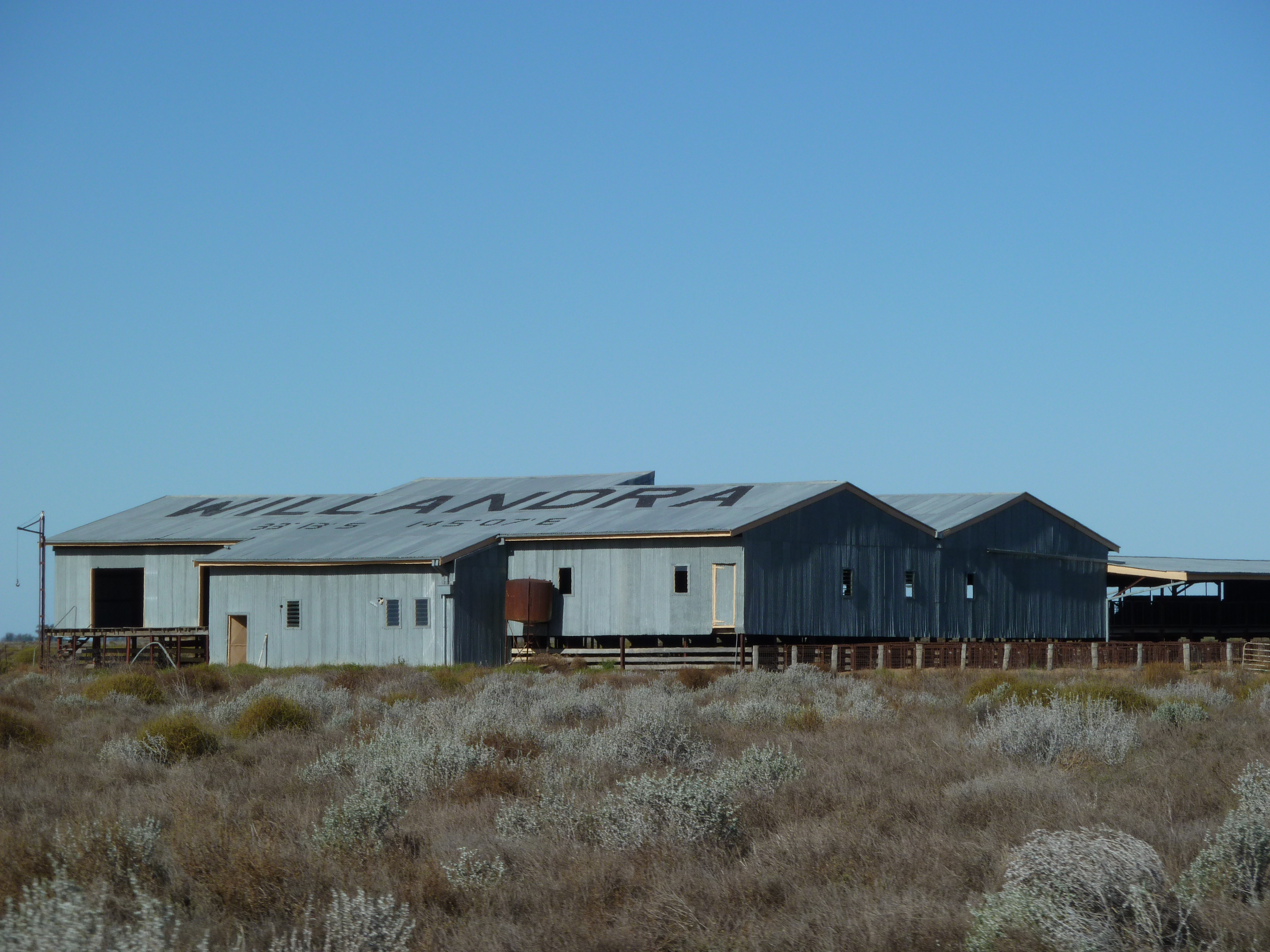
- Willandra shearing shed

- Location within New South Wales Location within Australia
- 33.2040°S 145.1552°E
- Location: Willandra National Park, Carrathool Shire, New South Wales, Australia

History
- Built: 1918–1918

Site notes
- Architect(s): Laird & Buchan
- Owner: Office of Environment and Heritage

New South Wales Heritage Register
- Official name: Willandra Homestead
- Type: state heritage (built)
- Designated: 2 April 1999
- Reference no.: 1009
- Type: Homestead building
- Category: Residential buildings (private)
- Builders: Frederick Coulson

Willandra Homestead is a heritage-listed homestead in the Willandra National Park, Carrathool Shire, New South Wales, Australia. It was designed by Laird & Buchan and built in 1918 by Frederick Coulson. The property is owned by the New South Wales Office of Environment and Heritage. It was added to the New South Wales State Heritage Register on 2 April 1999.

== History ==
Willandra Homestead was the residence of the former Willandra Station. Willandra Station had been settled in the 1880s by the partnership of Whittingham and Haynes, and had once consisted of 736,000 acres.

Willandra Station was the location of conflict during the 1890s shearing strikes, with Willandra shearers reportedly arming themselves to support the new shearers' union in 1890. Shearing at the station is referenced in the colonial folk song "Flash Jack from Gundagai".

It was subsequently owned by the London Bank of Australia before being sold to pastoral families the Fields and Vickerys in 1912. Under their management, it became one of the largest stud merino stations in Australia, running more than 90,000 sheep.

The current homestead was built in 1918. It uses some of the earliest asbestos fibrous cement sheeting manufactured in Australia.

The original shearing shed, which had 83 stands, burned down in the twentieth century and was replaced by a much smaller 12 stand shed.

The property was sold to the New Zealand Land Company in the 1950s and again to Dalgety & Company in 1960.

The Willandra National Park was created in May 1972 covering 13,000 acres of land, but did not initially include the homestead area. In 1974, the lease on the leasehold portion of the former station expired and was not renewed, and Dalgety decided to sell the freehold portion. Boral, whose managing director had been associated with the station, bought a 6,000 acre section including the homestead and shearing precincts for $100,000, donated it to the National Parks and Wildlife Service, and donated $30,000 towards the cost of establishing the park.

Following the handover to the National Parks and Wildlife Service, the fate of the homestead was initially unclear, and in 1977 it was described as "unoccupied and in bad repair" with no decision made about its future. It underwent stabilisation works in the 1970s and 1980s, before the homestead and shearing precincts were fully restored between 1996 and 2001. The homestead complex now serves as tourist accommodation, available in the homestead itself, cottage and men's quarters.

== Description ==
The homestead buildings survive in what is now the Willandra National Park.

The 26-room weatherboard main homestead, dating from 1918, is laid out in a U-shape around a central courtyard, surrounded by verandahs. The homestead complex also includes a number of surviving outbuildings, including jackaroos quarters (1918), ram shed (1933) and cottages (1940s).

The shearing precinct includes the shearers' quarters, cook house and overseers' cottage, all dating from 1936, and the rebuilt shearing shed, dating from 1960.

The main house is now used as upmarket accommodation, with less expensive accommodation also available on site.

The overseers' cottage, sections of the jackaroo's quarters, workshop, stables and garage are used for staff and management purposes.

== Heritage listing ==
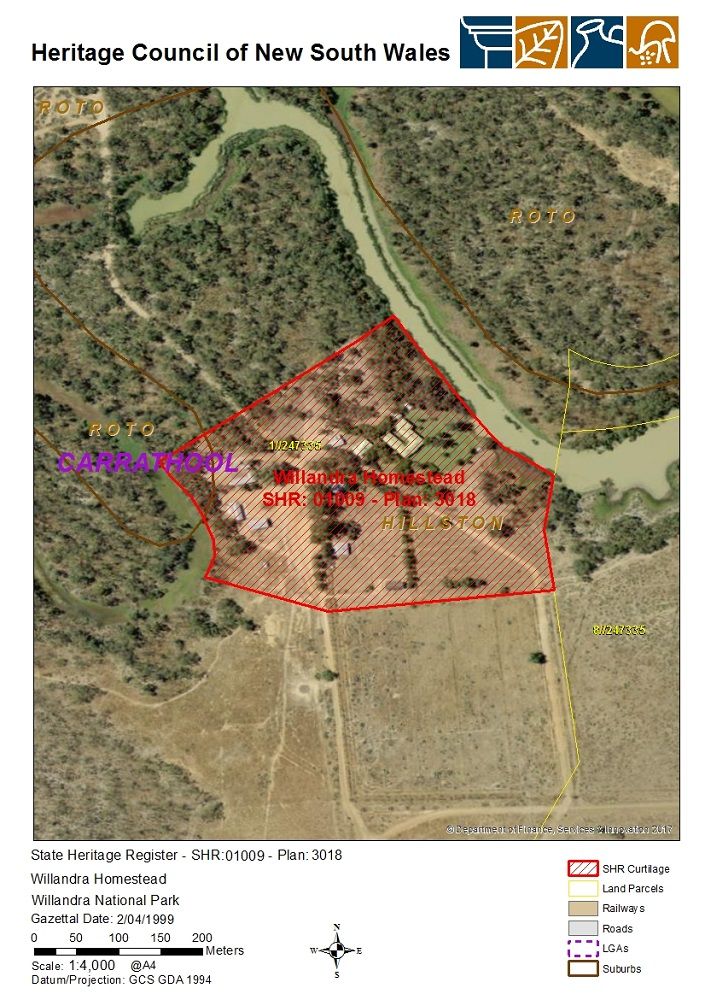
Heritage boundaries

The homestead is of state significance as a rare, intact and confident example of domestic rural architecture influenced by international trends in modern architectural design and aesthetics. The residence was designed by Laird and Buchan a well known and successful Victorian architectural firm. It is a modernist interpretation of a rural homestead form completely built with the most modern materials and restrained use of architectural decorations in vogue at the time. The building demonstrates the aspirations of the Willandra Pastoral Co., and their optimism for the future of the property buoyed by the end of World War One. The homestead is the centre piece of the homestead precinct situated in a formally landscaped context, complete with associational outbuildings, utilitarian and pleasure gardens and recreational facilities.

Willandra Homestead was listed on the New South Wales State Heritage Register on 2 April 1999.
