= Hillston, New South Wales =

Hillston
- Town
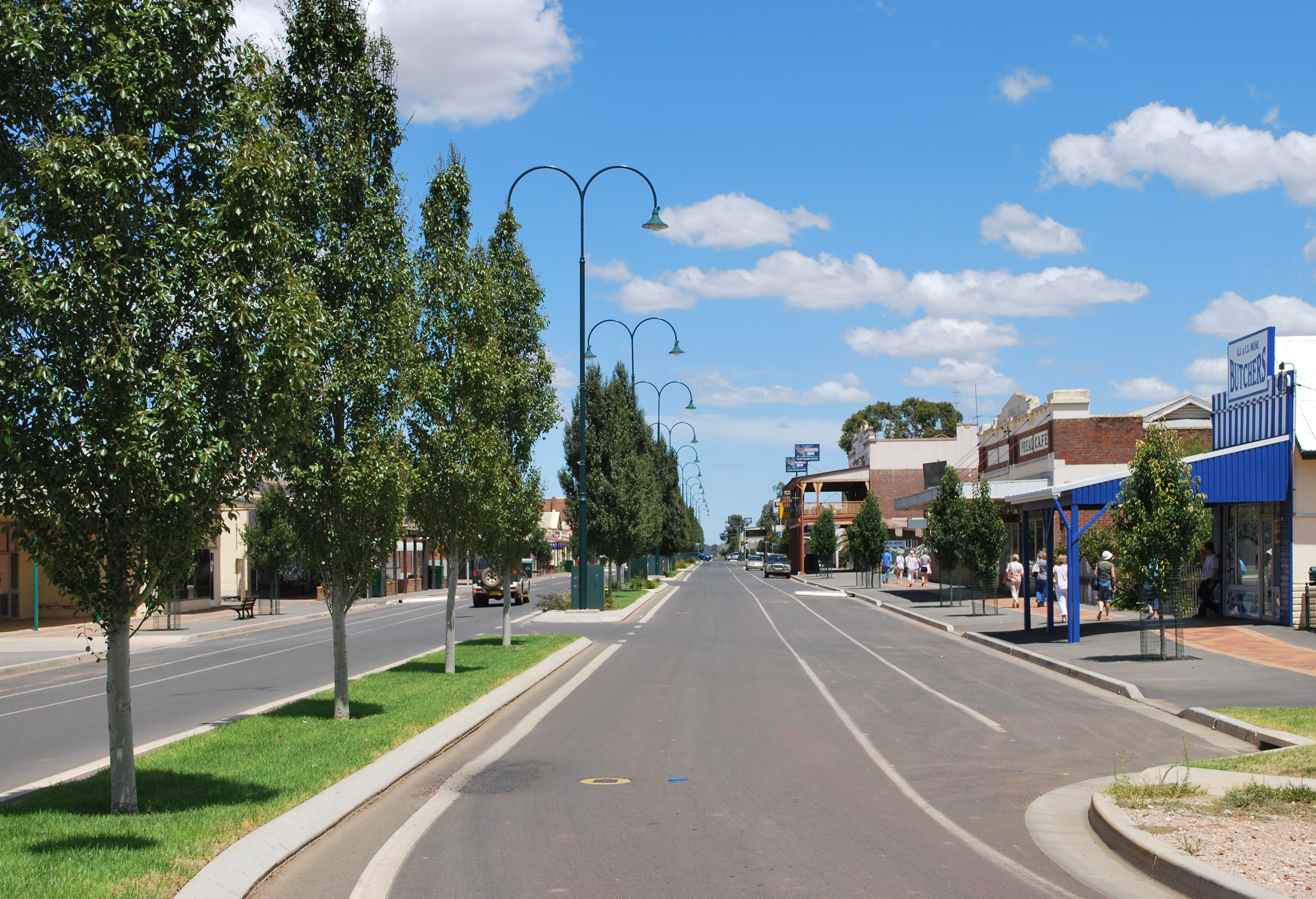
- High Street, the main street of Hillston

- Coordinates: 33°29′07″S 145°31′58″E
- Country: Australia
- State: New South Wales
- LGA: Carrathool Shire
- Location: 683 km (424 mi) W of Sydney; 590 km (370 mi) N of Melbourne; 110 km (68 mi) N of Griffith
- Established: 1863

Government
  - State electorate: Murray
  - Federal division: Farrer
- Elevation: 122.0 m (400.3 ft)

Population
  - Total: 1,547 (2021 census)
- Postcode: 2675
- County: Nicholson
- Mean max temp: 24.3 °C (75.7 °F)
- Mean min temp: 10.9 °C (51.6 °F)
- Annual rainfall: 367.0 mm (14.45 in)

Hillston is a township in western New South Wales, Australia, in Carrathool Shire, on the banks of the Lachlan River. It was founded in 1863 and at the 2021 census had a population of 1,547.

== History ==
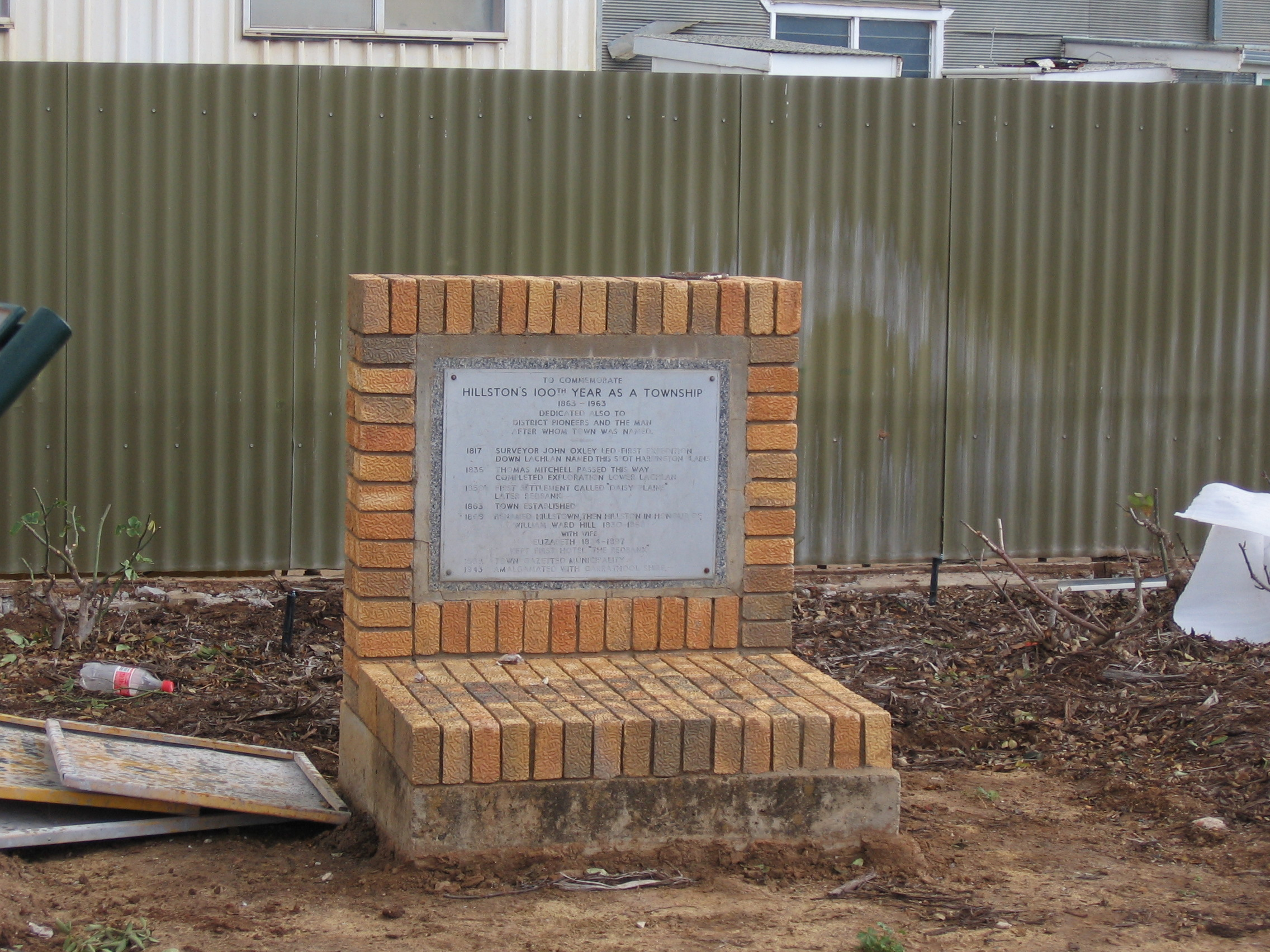
Memorial marking the centenary of the establishment of the town

John Oxley and his exploration party were the first European visitors to the Hillston district, in 1817. Oxley wrote in his journal: "country uninhabitable and useless for all purposes of civilised man".

In 1839 William Hovell followed the Lachlan River to near the site of present-day Hillston and took up a pastoral holding called "Bellingerambil" (later named "Cowl Cowl").

=== Redbank ===
The locality of present-day Hillston was a crossing-place for stock on the Lachlan River. The earliest European name for the place was 'Daisy Plains' or ‘Daisy Hill’. Later it became known as "Redbank" (following the Wiradjuri name 'Melnunni', meaning "red soil"). In 1863 a stockman named William Ward Hill from nearby "Roto" station established an inn – the Redbank Hotel – at the location. William Hill died on 10 July 1867 of "exhaustion from intemperance" and his widow, Elizabeth, took over the licence of the Redbank Hotel (which she held until about 1871). In 1869, when the first post office was opened, the township was renamed Hillston, after its founding publican.

The site of Hillston was originally on land owned by John McGee, who obtained a sub-division and sold lots by public auction, "the lots realising high prices". The Government also surveyed a township just north of McGee’s land. Sixty-four lots at Hillston North were also auctioned, bringing "up to £100 per acre". Thus two townships developed side-by-side.

Hillston developed as a service centre to the surrounding pastoral holdings, so the pace of development of the township was closely linked to prevailing conditions as they affected the district pastoral enterprises. Due in large measure to drought conditions in the district there was little or no progress of the township during the mid-1860s. However, more favourable seasons by the end of the decade, with the return of more reliable rainfall, led to a revitalization of Hillston's prospects.

=== Township development ===
Hillston developed as a service centre to the surrounding pastoral holdings. The Moss brothers, who were successful store-owners at Hay, established a store at Hillston by 1869. Hillston Post Office opened on 1 February 1869. In mid-1871 the partnership between the brothers was dissolved and Louis Moss ran the Hillston store on his own account.

The first Police Court at Hillston was held on 28 August 1873 in a room at one of the hotels in the town.

The first church at Hillston was of the Anglican denomination. A Roman Catholic church was built during the 1880s. The first Pastoral and Agricultural Show was held at Hillston in 1881. A hospital was erected in the township in 1882; the cost of the building was raised by voluntary subscription. A new post office was completed in 1883 (in the charge of Mr. W. S. Bellamy). A courthouse at Hillston was completed in about 1883.

Hillston became a municipality in 1888.

The store that became known as Nall, Jackson & Co. Ltd. was established in 1889; the firm had changed its name on various occasions, being known as "Villa and Rossi", "Villa, Rossi and Nall", "J. T. Jackson", and "Nall, Jackson & Co." Nall, Jackson & Co., which later opened branches at Merriwagga and Goolgowi, became a mainstay of the Hillston and district community.

A Presbyterian Church was built at Hillston in 1890.

A magistrate was resident at Hillston until 1916, after which the Hay magistrate visited once a month.

Following the First World War, the Hillston area was divided into relatively small rural properties onto which returning soldiers were repatriated under the New South Wales soldier settlement scheme. The railway between Griffith and Hillston was completed in 1923 and large areas of Crown land along the route were made available for selection.

By the end of the 1920s, with the influx of population to the district, the prevailing optimistic mood led to progress and growth at Hillston. A lighting system was installed at Hillston in 1929. During the same year, the old Club House Hotel was replaced by a two-storey building and the Royal Mail Hotel was extended. The firm of Messrs. Parker and Cordato built rows of shops in the township. In early 1931 the Hillston to Roto railway was completed.

In the wake of a land boom during the mid to late-1920s, the reality of marginal nature of the land became manifest and the soldier settlement blocks were found to be too small to be economically viable. The personal and financial hardships experienced during the inter-war decades resulted in many of these families walking off their blocks, and Hillston began to experience a decline.

The wool boom of the 1950s led to reconstruction of the town, and gave new optimism, only to enter a decline again in the 1960s and 1970s.

Until the bitumen sealing of the Kidman Way from Griffith was completed in the early 1970s, the rough dirt road was an effective barrier to communications with other communities. A train service existed until the mid-1970s, but since then there has been no public transport service to Hillston.

In the late 1990s, the introduction of cotton saw a boom period once again which, after a severe drought 2002–2007, is again establishing itself.

In August 2021, a new high-resolution doppler weather radar was opened in Hillston. It is operated by the Bureau of Meteorology, providing coverage across the Riverina and western New South Wales.

== Heritage listings ==
Hillston has a number of heritage-listed sites, including:

- Willandra National Park: Willandra Homestead

== Climate ==
Hillston has a borderline hot semi-arid / cold semi-arid climate (BSh / BSk) with very hot summers and relatively cool winters. Rainfall records have been kept for Hillston since 1881, while those of mean temperature since 1907. Seasonal range is quite marked. The highest temperature recorded was 47.2 °C (117.0 °F) on 11 January 2017; the lowest was −4.6 °C (23.7 °F) on 3 August 2014, though extreme temperature records are only available to 1957. The average annual rainfall is 375.2 millimetres (14.77 in). Snow has never been recorded in Hillston.

Climate data for Hillston Airport (1907–2024, rainfall to 1881); 122 m AMSL; 33.49° S, 145.52° E
Month	Jan	Feb	Mar	Apr	May	Jun	Jul	Aug	Sep	Oct	Nov	Dec	Year
Record high °C (°F)	47.0 (116.6)	47.2 (117.0)	42.0 (107.6)	38.2 (100.8)	30.0 (86.0)	26.0 (78.8)	26.2 (79.2)	30.7 (87.3)	37.6 (99.7)	39.8 (103.6)	43.8 (110.8)	45.5 (113.9)	47.2 (117.0)
Mean daily maximum °C (°F)	33.6 (92.5)	32.8 (91.0)	29.3 (84.7)	24.4 (75.9)	19.4 (66.9)	15.8 (60.4)	15.1 (59.2)	17.2 (63.0)	20.9 (69.6)	24.8 (76.6)	28.6 (83.5)	31.6 (88.9)	24.5 (76.0)
Mean daily minimum °C (°F)	18.5 (65.3)	18.3 (64.9)	15.2 (59.4)	10.6 (51.1)	7.3 (45.1)	4.8 (40.6)	3.8 (38.8)	4.9 (40.8)	7.1 (44.8)	10.4 (50.7)	13.8 (56.8)	16.4 (61.5)	10.9 (51.7)
Record low °C (°F)	6.0 (42.8)	7.7 (45.9)	4.5 (40.1)	0.5 (32.9)	−3.2 (26.2)	−4.0 (24.8)	−4.4 (24.1)	−4.6 (23.7)	−2.2 (28.0)	1.0 (33.8)	2.4 (36.3)	4.4 (39.9)	−4.6 (23.7)
Average precipitation mm (inches)	32.0 (1.26)	27.0 (1.06)	33.3 (1.31)	28.0 (1.10)	32.9 (1.30)	35.2 (1.39)	30.3 (1.19)	30.7 (1.21)	28.7 (1.13)	36.5 (1.44)	30.6 (1.20)	30.1 (1.19)	375.2 (14.77)
Average precipitation days (≥ 0.2 mm)	3.9	3.4	3.8	4.2	5.5	7.2	7.5	7.3	5.8	5.8	4.3	4.1	62.8
Average afternoon relative humidity (%)	29	32	36	42	52	59	57	50	43	38	31	29	41

== Media ==
Radio stations that broadcast to the town are Triple M Riverina MIA, hit99.7 Riverina MIA, and 2MIA. In terms of ABC Local Radio, the town is served by both ABC Riverina and ABC Central West.

The local newspaper is served by the Hillston-Ivanhoe Spectator.

Hilltson receives five free-to-air television networks: ABC, SBS, Prime7, Nine, and Southern Cross 10.

== Industry ==
Agriculture is the main industry in Hillston mostly oriented towards livestock, grain, cotton, citrus and vegetables, utilising irrigation from the Lachlan River and underground water sources.

Because of the proximity of Hillston to the Kidman Way, Lachlan Valley Way and the Cobb Highway many road transport companies operate in Hillston.

Historical population
Year	Pop.	±%
1921	546	—
1933	1,137	+108.2%
1947		—
1954	1,019	—
1961		—
1966	1,036	—
1971	1,009	−2.6%
1976	889	−11.9%
1981	999	+12.4%
1986	1,052	+5.3%
1991	1,030	−2.1%
1996	1,099	+6.7%
2001	1,209	+10.0%
2006	1,054	−12.8%
2011	996	−5.5%
2016	1,093	+9.7%
2021	1,149	+5.1%
Source: Australian Bureau of Statistics data.

== Amenities ==
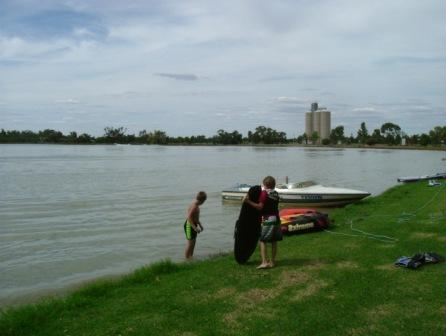
Lake Woorabinda

Town facilities include Lake Woorabinda, a man-made lake for water-skiing encircled by a scenic walking track between the river and the lake, community hall for sport and cultural events, and an art gallery in the main street.

Between Lake Woorabinda and the community hall lie a 25m public swimming pool and the Lions' Park, which incorporates children's play equipment and a barbecue area.

Hillston has two schools; Hillston Central School, a K-12 public school, and St Joseph's Primary School, a K-6 Catholic school.

Stan Peters Oval is the local sports ground, home to the Hillston Swans Australian Rules club in the Northern Riverina Football League and the Hillston Bluebirds Rugby League club in Group 17.

Hillston is the terminus of the open section of the Temora–Roto railway line. Passenger services were discontinued in 1974, but the line remains open to Hillston for goods services.
