= Tom Arthur (Australian politician) =

Australian politician

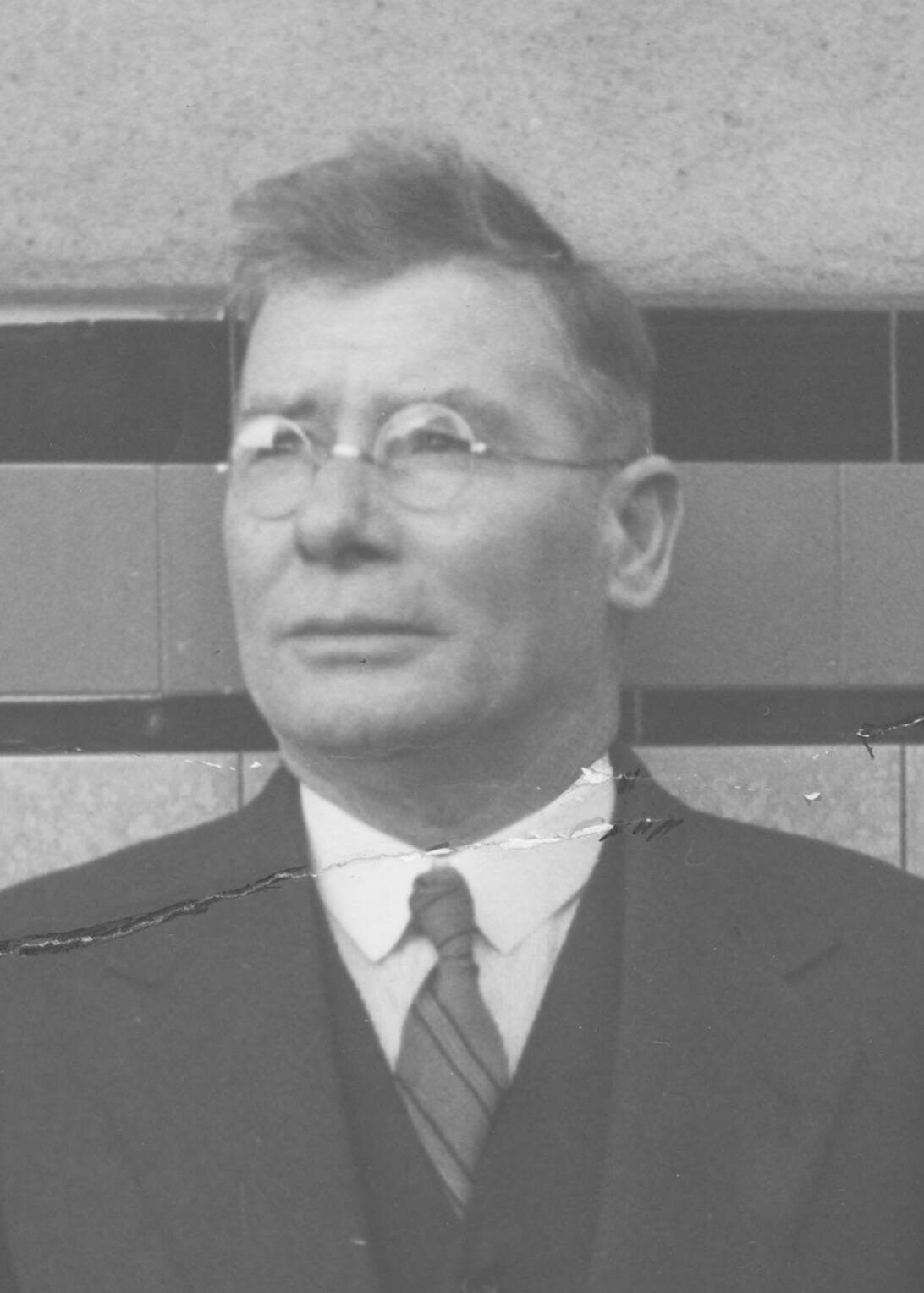

Senator for New South Wales
- In office 1 July 1938 – 30 June 1944

Personal details
- Born: Christopher Thomas Arthur; 11 May 1883 Forbes, New South Wales, Australia
- Died: 6 June 1953 (aged 70) Rydalmere, New South Wales, Australia
- Party: Labor (to 1943); Independent (from 1943)
- Spouse: Kathleen O'Brien (m. 1917)
- Occupation: Miner

Thomas Christopher Arthur (born Christopher Thomas Arthur; 11 May 1883 – 6 June 1953) was an Australian politician and trade unionist. He was a Senate for New South Wales from 1938 to 1944. He represented the Australian Labor Party (ALP) until 1943, when he lost endorsement and was expelled from the party for recontesting his seat as an independent.

== Early life ==
Arthur was born on 11 May 1883 in Forbes, New South Wales. He was the son of Phillipina (née King) and William John Arthur. His father was a miner.

Arthur left school at a young age and worked as a miner and shearer. According to The Forbes Advocate, he was educated in West Wyalong and was apprenticed as a compositor for a period, working on The Lachlander in Condobolin. Arthur was active in the labour movement from the early 1890s and joined the Australian Workers' Union (AWU). He was appointed as a paid organiser for the AWU and was an acquaintance of other leading figures in the union including John Barnes and John McNeill. Arthur served as a rural commissioner on the New South Wales Board of Trade from 1919 to 1922, where he was involved in setting wages and industrial conditions. By the late 1920s, he had moved to the coalfields near Lithgow and was secretary of the Lidsdale branch of the Western Miners' Federation.

== Politics ==
Arthur first stood for parliament at the 1917 New South Wales state election, running unsuccessfully in the seat of Hawkesbury. He served on the ALP's central executive in New South Wales from 1918 to 1922.

At the 1937 federal election, Arthur was elected to a six-year Senate term beginning on 1 July 1938. With Stanley Amour, Bill Ashley, and John Arstrong, he was one of the so-called "four A's" who formed the ALP ticket in New South Wales — chosen in a ploy to secure the donkey vote at a time when candidates were listed alphabetically on the ballot paper.

In the Senate, Arthur "generally spoke on issues of personal interest or on specific matters that had been drawn to his attention", including matters relating to the coal-mining industry. In March 1943 he introduced a policy motion to the ALP caucus calling for the nationalisation of the liquor industry. Arthur was a supporter of the petroleum exploration industry and was appointed as a director of Producers' Oil Wells Supplies Ltd. He used parliamentary speeches to call on the government to give financial support to the company, to raise allegations of corruption within the industry, and to criticise members of the government's Oil Advisory Committee. In response, interior minister Harry Foll stated that he had acted improperly and "used his privileged position as a member of this Senate not merely for the purpose of ventilating a personal grievance, which, of course, he had every right to do, but also for the purpose of 'boosting' a company with which, apparently he is actively associated".

Arthur was defeated by Donald Grant in the ALP preselection ballot for the 1943 federal election. At the last minute, he decided to nominate for re-election as an independent. He was consequently expelled from the ALP on 31 July 1943. He failed in his re-election bid at the 1943 election, although his term did not end until 30 June 1944.

Following his defeat, Arthur effectively held the balance of power in the Senate for nine months, as the ALP held 18 out of 36 seats and was reliant on his vote for the passage of legislation (although it occasionally received the vote of UAP dissident Thomas Crawford). Arthur was the deciding vote in the passage of the Coal Production (War-time) Act 1944. In the lead-up to the vote, he caused a minor controversy when he was unable to be located. After several hours he was found drinking alone in his room at the Hotel Canberra.

== Personal life ==
In 1917, Arthur married Kathleen O'Brien, with whom he had one son. He died on 6 June 1953 at the Rydalmere Mental Hospital.

According to political journalist Don Whitington, Arthur was an alcoholic and was "stupid from the effects of liquor most of the time he was in the Senate".
