= Damian Kennedy =

Australian rugby league footballer

Personal information
- Born: 29 June 1974 (age 51) Forbes, New South Wales, Australia

Playing information
- Position: Second-row
Club
Years	Team	Pld	T	G	FG	P
1995–98	Western Suburbs	64	13	1	0	54
1999–00	Canberra Raiders	14	4	0	0	16
2003	London Broncos	16	1	0	0	4
	Total	94	18	1	0	74
- Source: As of 31 May 2019

Damian Kennedy is an Australian former professional rugby league footballer who played in the 1990s and 2000s. He played for the Western Suburbs Magpies and the Canberra Raiders

== Playing career ==
Kennedy made his first grade debut for Western Suburbs against the Brisbane Broncos in Round 2 1995. In 1996, Kennedy played 22 times for Wests as the club finished in 8th position on the table and qualified for the finals. Western Suburbs were eliminated in week one of the 1996 finals series losing to Cronulla 20-12 at Parramatta Stadium with Kennedy playing at second-row. This would be the last time Western Suburbs would reach the finals.

In 1998, Kennedy made 22 appearances for the club in his last year there. Western Suburbs finished the 1998 season in last place winning only 4 games for the entire year but were handed the wooden spoon as the Gold Coast Chargers who had also finished bottom avoided last position due to a better for and against.

In 1999, Kennedy joined Canberra and in his first season in the nation's capital the club missed the finals by one competition point. Kennedy only made one appearance the following season and retired at the end of 2000.
