= Adrian Toole =

Australian rugby league footballer

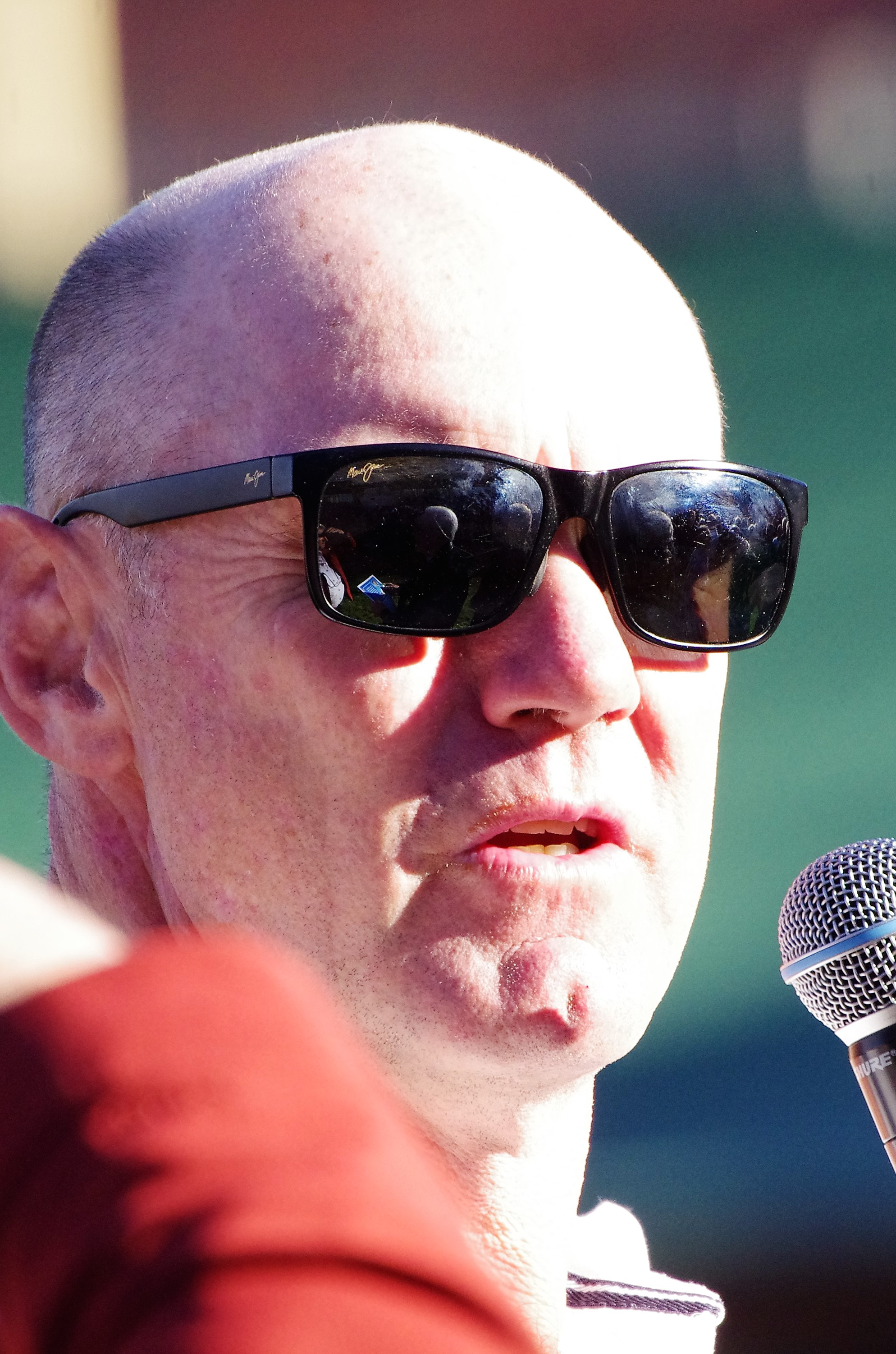

Personal information
- Full name: Adrian James Toole
- Born: 12 June 1965 (age 61) Forbes, New South Wales, Australia

Playing information
- Position: Prop
Club
Years	Team	Pld	T	G	FG	P
1985–95	North Sydney Bears	130	8	0	0	32
1995–96	Huddersfield	36	9	0	0	36
	Total	166	17	0	0	68

Adrian James Toole (born 12 June 1965) is an Australian former professional rugby league footballer who played in the 1980s and 1990s. He played for the North Sydney Bears and Huddersfield, primarily as a prop.

== Playing career ==
A Forbes junior, Toole trialed with the North Sydney Bears in 1985. Later that year, he made his first grade debut under the coaching of former North Sydney and St. George forward Brian Norton in round 24 of the 1985 season against the Manly Sea Eagles at Brookvale Oval, and for 8 seasons from 1988 was a permanent first grade player and North Sydney stalwart.

During Toole's tenure with the Bears, the club's fortunes turned around. They went from being easybeats (not having won a premiership since 1922) to title contenders. They finished one game shy of qualifying for the club's first Grand Final appearance since 1943, losing both the 1991 and 1994 preliminary finals to the Canberra Raiders. Toole however won a Reserve Grade premiership with Norths in 1993. Toole retired at the end of the 1995 season after his side's 20-10 loss to the Newcastle Knights in the first week of the 1995 finals series. He played 130 games for the Bears and scored 8 tries.

== Post playing ==
In 2006, Toole narrowly missed out on selection in North Sydney's Team of the Century. Gary Larson and Billy Wilson were instead chosen as props.
