= Forbes railway station =

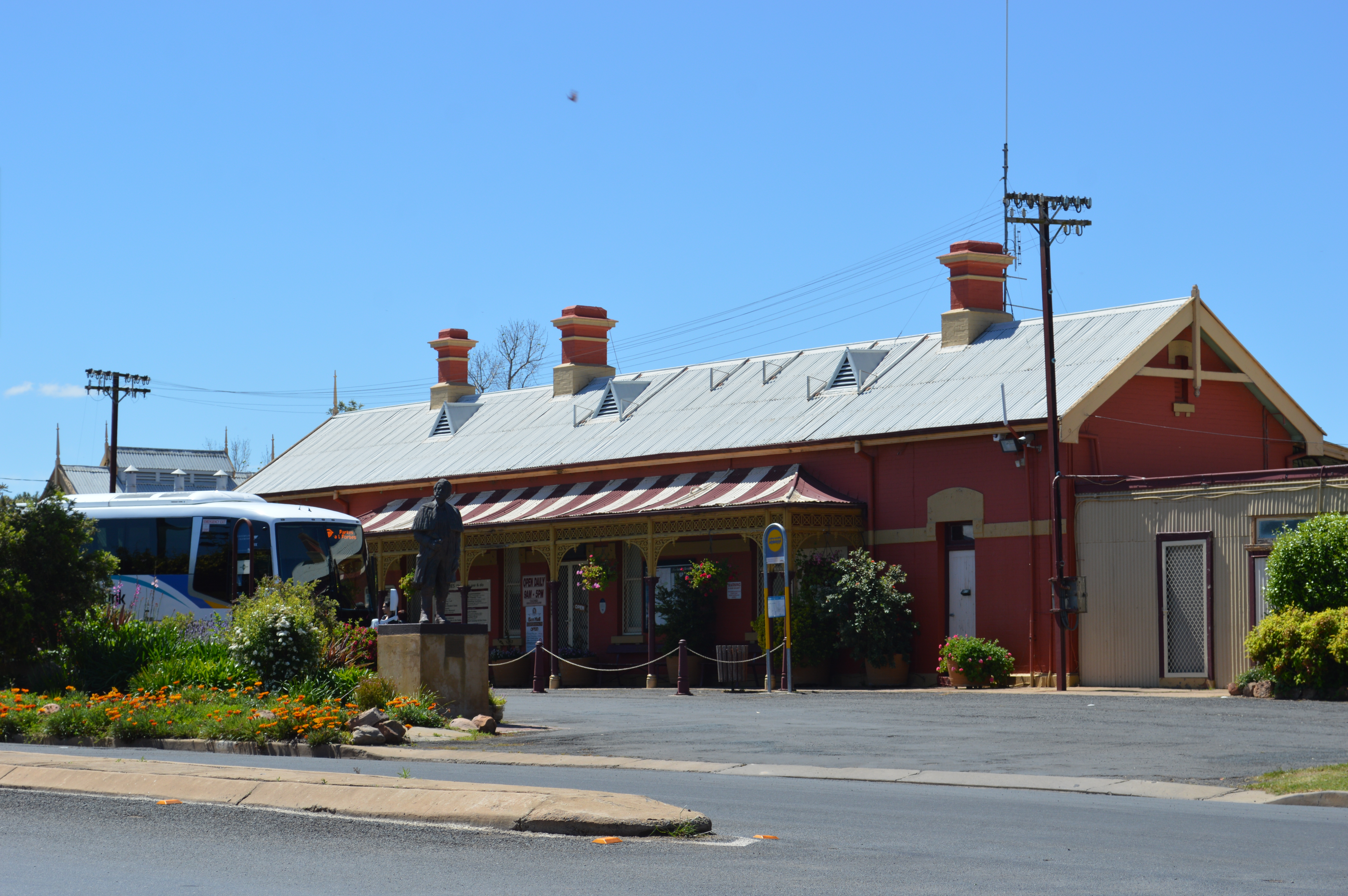
- Forbes station building, 2013

- Location within New South Wales Location within Australia
- 33.3794°S 148.0122°E
- Location: Stockinbingal–Parkes line, Forbes, Forbes Shire, New South Wales, Australia

Site notes
- Owner: Transport Asset Manager of New South Wales

New South Wales Heritage Register
- Official name: Forbes Railway Station group
- Type: state heritage (complex / group)
- Designated: 2 April 1999
- Reference no.: 1145
- Type: Railway Platform/ Station
- Category: Transport - Rail

Forbes railway station is a heritage-listed former railway station on the Stockinbingal–Parkes railway line at Forbes, New South Wales, Australia. The property was added to the New South Wales State Heritage Register on 2 April 1999.

== History ==
Forbes railway station opened on 18 December 1893. The last passenger service ceased on 15 October 1974, and the station formally closed in 1990.

The station building operated as the Forbes Railway Visitor Information Centre between c. 1990 and 2023.

In 2026, as part of the Inland Rail project, the Australian Rail Track Corporation trimmed the station awning, and realigned the track to increase both vertical and horizontal clearances, to allow the passage of 6.5-metre-high double-stacked freight trains.

== Description ==
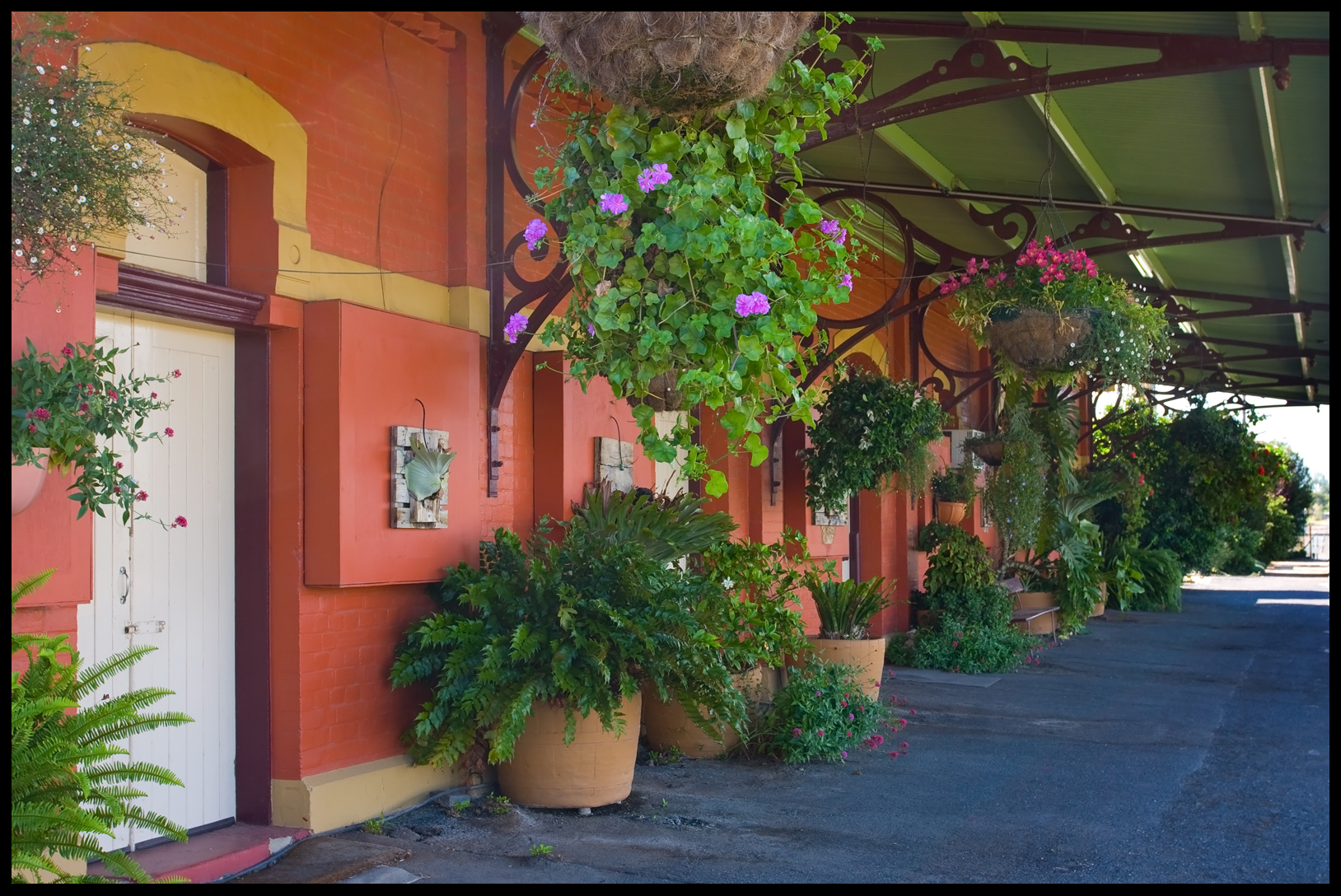
Station platform, 2007

The heritage-listed complex consists of a Type-4 brick station building of standard roadside design, and a brick and concrete-faced platform, both dating from 1893. The dock platform, station fences, and garden and entrance forecourt, are also heritage-listed.

== Heritage listing ==
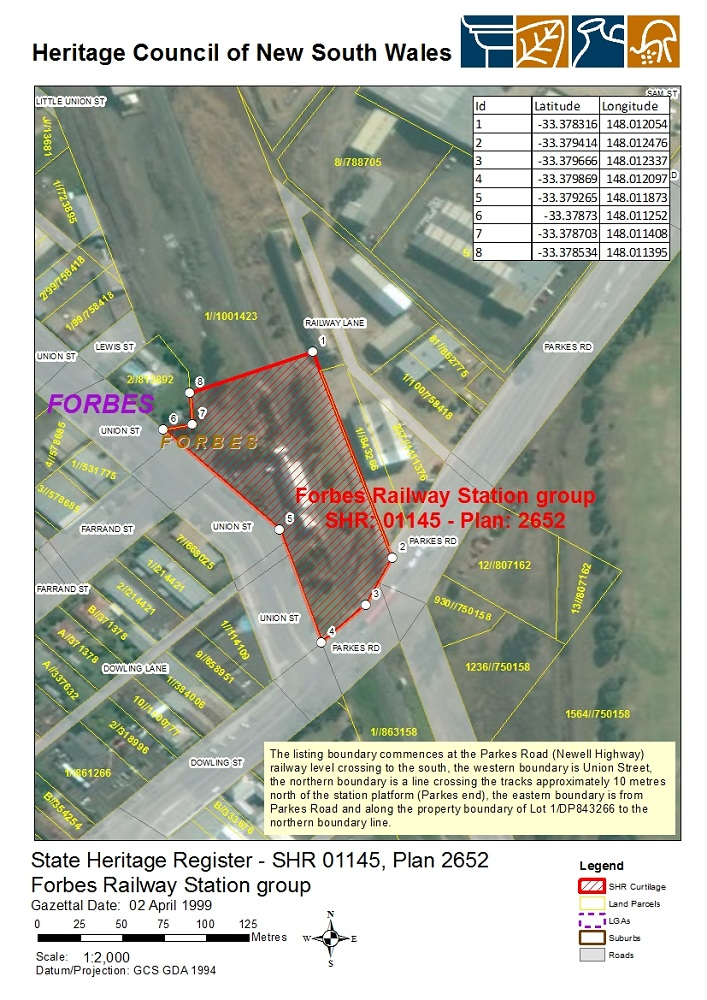
Heritage area boundaries

Forbes railway station and residence is one of the best surviving standard roadside stations. Both buildings are in excellent condition and retain their traditional setting with good detailing to both buildings and grounds. The station area retains planting and entrance arrangements, with fencing, that illustrate past use of the railway property. They are important elements in the townscape of Forbes as significant civic buildings located at the northern entrance to the town. The garden remnant is important as the station garden was a winner of many railway garden competitions.

Forbes railway station was listed on the New South Wales State Heritage Register on 2 April 1999, having satisfied the following criteria:

- The place possesses uncommon, rare or endangered aspects of the cultural or natural history of New South Wales.
- This item is assessed as historically rare. This item is assessed as architecturally rare. This item is assessed as socially rare.
