= Forbes Times =

Front page, Forbes Times, 13 January 1920

The Forbes Times was an English language newspaper published in Forbes, New South Wales, Australia.

== History ==
The Forbes Times was first published on 3 September 1870 by a Mr. J. Felt and ran until 31 March 1920 when it was incorporated into The Forbes Advocate.

The paper was "taken over" by The Forbes Advocate run by G.W. Brownhill. The New South Wales Country Free Press Association had long been advocating for the amalgamation of country newspapers where more than one existed in rural districts. With three local papers in Forbes, the scarcity and high cost of paper immediately after the first world war led to uncertainty in the market. Brownhill's decision to incorporate the Forbes Times into The Forbes Advocate was seen as not only necessary, but as a shrewd business move by both reducing production overheads and by eliminating a competitor.

== Digitisation ==
The Forbes Times has been digitised as part of the Australian Newspapers Digitisation Program of the National Library of Australia.

== See also ==
- List of newspapers in New South Wales
