= Forbes Advocate =

Australian newspaper

Front page, Forbes Advocate, 29 September 1939

The Forbes Advocate is an English language newspaper published in Forbes, New South Wales, Australia.

== History ==
The Forbes Advocate was first published on 1 December 1911 by G.W. Brownhill and continues to this day.

The Advocate incorporated the Forbes Times on 31 March 1920. In buying out the Forbes Times, Brownhill both eliminated a competitor and reduced the costs involved in running the paper, as the scarcity and price of paper had dramatically increased in the post-war climate of Australia.

According to the Australian Community Media AdCentre run by Fairfax Media, "The strength of the Forbes Advocate lies in its commitment to covering local events from local government to community organisations, social and sporting events as well as tackling the issues that matter."

== Digitisation ==
The Forbes Advocate has been digitised as part of the Australian Newspapers Digitisation Program of the National Library of Australia.

== See also ==
- List of newspapers in New South Wales
