= Forbes Post Office =

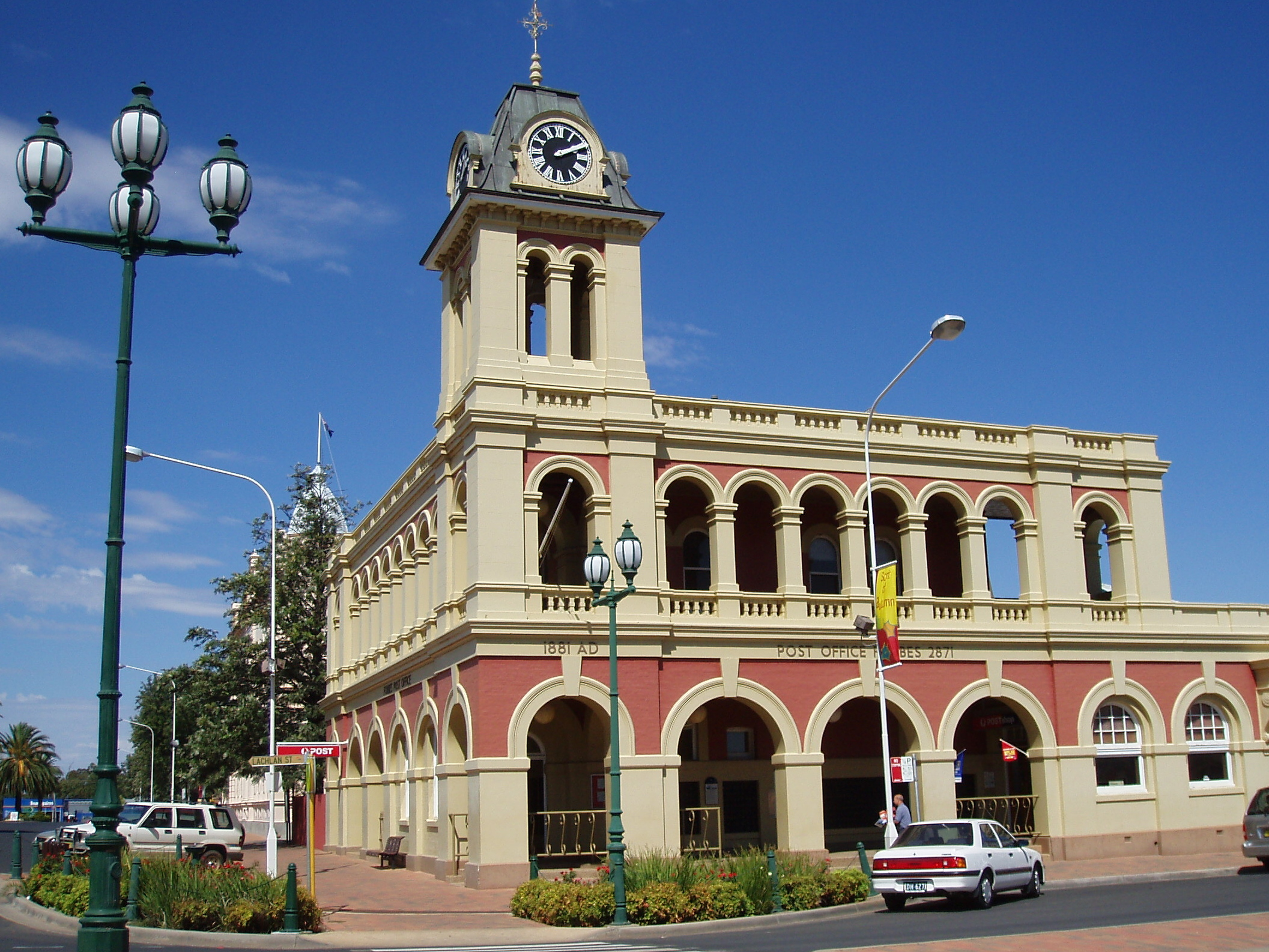

- Location within New South Wales Location within Australia
- 33.3854°S 148.0076°E
- Location: 118 Lachlan Street, Forbes, Forbes Shire, New South Wales, Australia

History
- Built: 1879–1881

Site notes
- Architect: NSW Colonial Architect’s Office under James Barnet.
- Owner: Australia Post

New South Wales Heritage Register
- Official name: Forbes Post Office; Post Office
- Type: state heritage (built)
- Designated: 22 December 2000
- Reference no.: 1414
- Type: Post Office
- Category: Postal and Telecommunications
- Builders: P.M. Vaughan

Commonwealth Heritage List
- Official name: Forbes Post Office
- Type: Listed place (Historic)
- Designated: 22 June 2004
- Reference no.: 105502

Forbes Post Office is a heritage-listed post office at 118 Lachlan Street, Forbes, in the Central West region of New South Wales, Australia. It was designed by the New South Wales Colonial Architect's Office under James Barnet and built from 1879 to 1881 by P. M. Vaughan. The property is owned by Australia Post. It was added to the New South Wales State Heritage Register on 22 December 2000. It was added to the Australian Commonwealth Heritage List on 22 June 2004.

== History ==
=== Postal services ===
The first official postal service in Australia was established in April 1809, when the Sydney merchant Isaac Nichols was appointed as the first Postmaster in the colony of NSW. Prior to this, mail had been distributed directly by the captain of the ship on which the mail arrived, however this system was neither reliable nor secure.

In 1825 the colonial administration was empowered to establish a Postmaster General's Department, which had previously been administered from Britain.

In 1828 the first post offices outside of Sydney were established, with offices in Bathurst, Campbelltown, Parramatta, Liverpool, Newcastle, Penrith and Windsor. By 1839 there were forty post offices in the colony, with more opened as settlement spread. During the 1860s, the advance of postal services was further increased as the railway network began to be established throughout NSW. In 1863, the Postmaster General W. H. Christie noted that accommodation facilities for Postmasters in some post offices was quite limited, and stated that it was a matter of importance that "post masters should reside and sleep under the same roof as the office".

The first telegraph line was opened in Victoria in March 1854 and in NSW in 1858. The NSW colonial government constructed two lines from the General Post Office, Sydney, one to the South Head Signal Station, the other to Liverpool. Development was slow in NSW compared to the other states, with the Government concentrating on the development of country offices before suburban ones. As the line spread, however, telegraph offices were built to accommodate the operators. Unlike the Post Office, the telegraph office needed specialised equipment and could not be easily accommodated in a local store or private residence. Post and telegraph offices operated separately until January 1870 when the departments were amalgamated, after which time new offices were built to include both postal and telegraph services. In 1881 the first telephone exchange was opened in Sydney, three years after the first tests in Adelaide. As with the telegraph, the telephone system soon began to extend into country areas, with telephone exchanges appearing in country NSW from the late 1880s onwards. Again the Post Office was responsible for the public telephone exchange, further emphasising its place in the community as a provider of communications services.

The appointment of James Barnet as Acting Colonial Architect in 1862 coincided with a considerable increase in funding to the public works program. Between 1865 and 1890 the Colonial Architects Office was responsible for the building and maintenance of 169 Post Offices and telegraph offices in NSW. The post offices constructed during this period featured in a variety of architectural styles, as Barnet argued that the local parliamentary representatives always preferred "different patterns".

The construction of new post offices continued throughout the 1890s depression years under the leadership of Walter Liberty Vernon, who held office from 1890 to 1911. While twenty-seven post offices were built between 1892 and 1895, funding to the Government Architect's Office was cut from 1893 to 1895, causing Vernon to postpone a number of projects.

Following Federation in 1901, the Commonwealth Government took over responsibility for post, telegraph and telephone offices, with the Department of Home Affairs Works Division being made responsible for post office construction. In 1916 construction was transferred to the Department of Works and Railways, with the Department of the Interior responsible during World War II.

On 22 December 1975, the Postmaster General's Department was abolished and replaced by the Post and Telecommunications Department. This was the creation of Telecom and Australia Post. In 1989, the Australian Postal Corporation Act established Australia Post as a self-funding entity, heralding a new direction in property management, including a move away from the larger more traditional buildings towards smaller shop front style post offices.

For much of its history, the post office has been responsible for a wide variety of community services including mail distribution, an agency for the Commonwealth Savings Bank, electoral enrolments, and the provision of telegraph and telephone services. The town post office has served as a focal point for the community, most often built in a prominent position in the centre of town close to other public buildings, creating a nucleus of civic buildings and community pride.

=== Forbes Post Office ===
Forbes was founded in 1861 as a result of gold discoveries in the nearby Black Ridge Diggings. With 1500 miners on the diggings, a mail service was established at Black Ridge in 1861 with the office operating out of a rented premise belonging to a J. H. Burchart. As word of the discoveries began to spread, the population began to rapidly swell with upwards of 28000 miners in the new township by 1862. With the dramatic increase in the population it became evident that an official postmaster was required for the town. On 17 April 1862, Hayward Atkyns was appointed in the position on a salary of £200 per annum, with an Assistant Postmaster and two Stamp Sellers also employed by October. During the same month the telegraph was connected to Forbes, and moves were underway for the erection of an official Post and Telegraph Office. The new office was opened in October 1863 with a residence for the Telegraph Master upstairs, while the post masters residence was located off site. In 1867, the Post Master General took over the telegraph service, while in 1871 a branch of the Government Savings Bank was opened in the Post Office.

In 1877 the needs of the town necessitated a new post office. The office was to be built on the same site as the original building, facing Lachlan Street. £1200 was placed before the Parliamentary Estimates Committee at the instigation of Mr Lord MP for the construction of the new post office, however the Department of Works estimated that the final cost would be closer to £3000. During the construction period a temporary building was to be erected, with £200 approved for the construction. In the end, however, to save cost and time a building was rented for use as the office during the building works.

In 1879, after a number of reviews, the tender for the new building was accepted from P. M. Vaughan and the plans from the Colonial Architect were approved. Part of the delay was due to the ongoing debate over the installation of a clock tower. The addition of a tower would increase the building cost to £4500, which the Department thought to be too much. The PMG also informed the town that if a clock tower was to be added afterwards the cost would need to be borne by the municipality. In the end, the tower was erected as part of the main building. Further delays were also caused by the inclusion of an underground tank, fencing and iron rails.

The current Post Office building was completed in 1881, presumably comprising the two storey colonnaded section of the building and the corresponding areas of the ground floor. There are, perhaps, some small single-storey additions to the rear. It is possible that the western corner single-storey extension fronting Lachlan Street was constructed shortly after the original building was completed.

The Post Office was occupied on 8 September 1881. In 1900 the telephone exchange was opened with twenty-nine lines connected by the end of the year. A public phone was also added in 1905.

It appears that between 1900 and 1913, single storey face brick additions, including a telephone exchange were added to the southern corner and eastern side.

After 1928, it appears that the ground floor retail area underwent reconfiguration, including the closure of the western corner entry doors fronting Lachlan Street, and the removal of the doors beneath the tower into what is now the post boxes area in the Court Street facade. Dates are unknown, however these changes probably occurred during the 1980s renovation, which also included the infilling of the fireplaces. A window to the ground floor Court Street facade has also been infilled.

Other changes occurring since 1928 plans include the removal of the bathroom from the first floor eastern end of the colonnade and the conversion of the eastern bedroom into a bathroom and hot water service room.

A new telephone exchange was opened in 1962 with an automatic system replacing the manual exchange.

In 1982 Forbes Post Office was featured on a stamp series depicting one post office from each Australian State.

The clock mechanism was electrified in November 1982, eliminating the need for manual winding.

During alterations in 1984, several small buildings to the side of the main office were demolished and automatic doors were installed. Also during this time, general restoration work was carried out, including stripping and staining of internal joinery and a heritage exterior colour scheme.

In 1994 the retail area was refitted with a standard Australia Post fitout, with display wall panelling and new carpet in a grey colour scheme.

== Description ==
Siting and layout

Forbes Post Office occupies a prominent corner site in the Forbes civic centre. It is a two-storey rendered and painted brick building in the Victorian Italianate style of a grand scale, with Second Empire influence. There is a three and a half storey clock tower at the corner, flanked by two storey colonnades on Lachlan and Court Streets.

The only outbuilding belonging to the Post Office is a recent red brick cycle shed in the western corner of the site.

The surrounding streetscape is predominantly two to three storey late nineteenth and early twentieth century commercial and retail buildings, with wide landscaped streets, mature trees, pedestrian crossings and islands and pavers on the footpaths. Immediately surrounding the building are green painted bollards and heritage style lamp posts, along with modern street signage.

The yard has a large mature silky oak tree (Grevillea robusta) close to the corrugated iron fence on one street. A smaller Chinese pistachio (Pistacia chinensis) is further from the street, near the rear fence facing a laneway.

Main building

The building comprises a two-storey section fronting both streets and single-storey face red brick additions of English bond brickwork to the south and southwest. It was restored during the 1980s and currently has a colour scheme of dark red walls, cream detailing and white window frames.

It has a predominantly hipped, corrugated iron roof set behind a balustraded parapet to each facade. The clock tower is capped by a high mansard, rolled zinc roof, with a white on black background clock face projecting from each side and a wrought iron weather vane at the apex. The roof of the two-storey section of building is punctuated by four rendered and cream painted corbelled brick chimneys with serrated chimney pots at the south western and eastern sides, and a single chimney is located at the southern corner of the single storey section of building.

The ground-floor colonnade to each facade has a concrete and pebblecrete floor and steps, and arched bays with rendered architraves and emphasis on the keystones. There is iron palisade and wrought iron fencing between some bays and there is a recent ramp installed as part of the floor to the northern corner tower, leading into the end of the Lachlan Street colonnade. Two bays to the Court Street colonnade have been infilled with sash windows, and two bays to the Lachlan Street facade have been infilled, retaining multi-pane arched windows. To the south of these bays is an infilled doorway, with a projecting entablature supported on scrolled brackets.

The first-floor colonnade has a rendered open masonry balustrade painted cream, a flat boarded soffit painted tan, a concrete floor painted red and red painted face brick walls. There are large pendant globe light fittings to the first-floor and ground-floor colonnades.

The clock tower retains an hour striking bell in a belvedere, surmounted by the mansard roof and clock faces. The electrically powered clock mechanism is housed within the roof, which is lined with timber boards and is accessed via a series of three timber ladders.

Fenestration of the main building is symmetrical to each facade, including the evenly spaced colonnade bays.

The ground floor interior of Forbes Post Office is divided into four major areas. These comprise the public colonnaded areas to the exterior, the carpeted retail area to the western corner, sheet vinyl-floored mail room and post boxes to the northern corner, and carpeted and sheet vinyl contractor's rooms and staff amenities to the south eastern side of the building.

Ceilings to the ground-floor are a combination of square set plaster in the stair hall, contractor's room, kitchenette and office; board and batten ceiling in the mail room and retail area; plasterboard ceiling in the store room; and timber-boarded ceiling in the southern mail room. There are air conditioning units attached to some walls of the ground floor and there are ceiling fans in the retail area and in the southern corner of the mail room. Lighting in the ground floor consists of suspended and attached fluorescent tubing.

Architraves appear original and in good condition, though they have been restored and stained. There is little original skirting retained, seen only in the stair hall and contractor's room.

There are modern flush security doors in the exterior at the rear and four panel interior doors that have been restored with arched fanlights and some decorative glass. Windows are generally single upper and lower pane sash windows, with shallow arched upper sashes and later glazing. To the mail room there are shallow arched fixed light and sash windows and to the retail area there are some wide multi pane arched windows.

Ground floor walls are generally rendered brick and painted yellow, grey or apricot. There are recent grey painted plasterboard partition walls dividing the retail area and northern mail room. There are also curved niches in the external walls below each rectangular vent. The four fireplaces in the ground floor have been bricked in and only two timber surrounds have been retained in the contractor's room and eastern store room.

The first floor interior comprises three main areas, including the exterior colonnade, tiled bathroom in the eastern corner and the four carpeted former bedrooms and sitting room at centre, excepting the northern corner room, which currently has exposed timber floorboards. These rooms are used for storage.

Ceilings in the first floor are predominantly square set plaster, with a plaster ceiling and moulded cornice in the western corner of the former sitting room and board and batten ceiling in the northern corner room. There are attached fluorescent lights throughout and there are no fans or air conditioning units installed.

Architraves appear original and in good condition, though they have been restored and stained. There is some non-original picture rail in the northern and western corner rooms and the skirting appears original, being painted and stained.

The first-floor windows are generally single upper and lower pane sash windows with an arched top sash. There is a pair of original French doors at the centre of the Court Street facade and a four panel door to the hot water system room off the same colonnade. Fanlights are located over the French doors and over each restored internal four panel door.

The first floor walls are rendered brickwork in a yellow colour scheme and there is a single asbestos or fibre cement sheet partition wall dividing a hot water system room to the north and a bathroom to the south. The three fireplaces on the first floor have been bricked in, and there are two timber surrounds retained and a grey marble surround in the former sitting room.

The central stair has been restored with polished turned timber posts and balusters and carved brackets. It retains its original skirting and has timber panelling below with storage underneath. The stair branches out at the top landing. One branch leads to the eastern corner room, while the other goes to the mezzanine hall and remaining rooms. There is sheet vinyl flooring on the treads and landings with black edge strips.

Signage on the Post Office incorporates the lettering "Forbes Post Office" on the centre of both street facades at first floor level, with the postcode "2871" added to the Lachlan Street side. There is a standard Australia Post sign attached to the eastern end of the Court Street facade.

=== Condition ===
The exterior of Forbes Post Office is generally in very good condition. The interior ground floor is generally in good condition, however there are signs of rising damp in the southern corner where concrete has been laid up to the ground floor wall. The second floor is in good condition, excepting severe cracking in the square set plaster ceilings, some water damage to the western corner room cornice and some minor paint peeling to the same room.

There is some archaeological potential on the site relating to previous buildings and use, including the earlier post office.

The exterior is intact in its original form, along with the majority of internal fabric on the first floor. However, the ground floor has been substantially altered over time. Forbes Post Offices still retains the features which make it culturally significant, including the prominent corner clock tower, imposing round arched arcades, stucco wall finish and overall scale form and style.

== Heritage listing ==
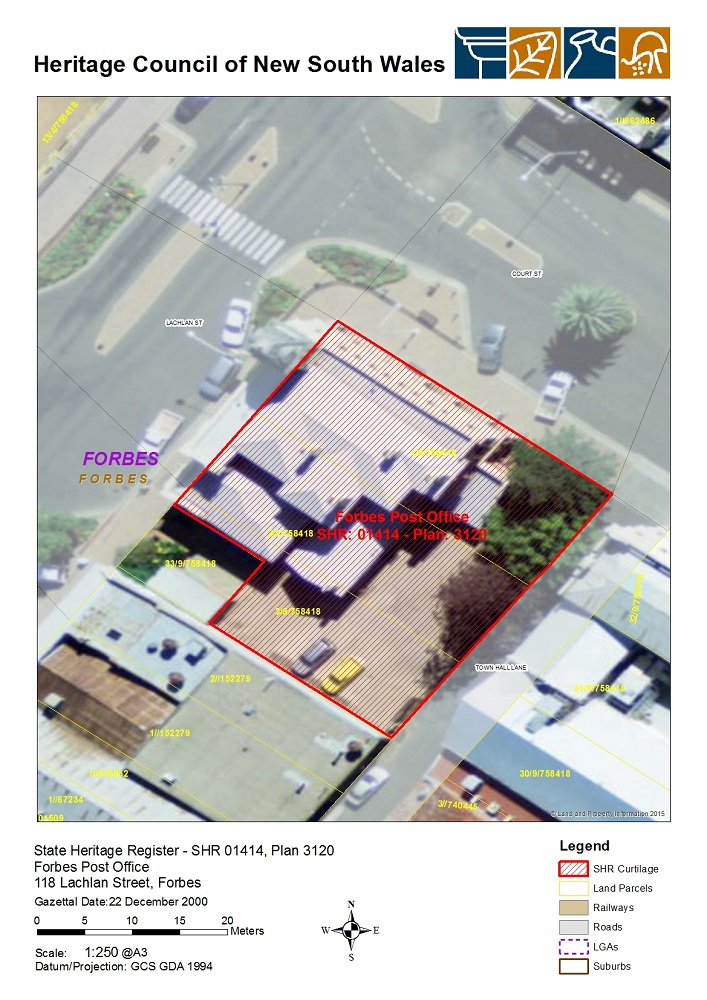
Heritage boundaries

Forbes Post Office is significant at a State level for its historical associations, aesthetic qualities and social meaning.

Forbes Post Office is associated with the establishment of the town, as it is linked with the original postal services established in 1861. As such, it is also associated with the discovery of gold in the area and the subsequent population explosion between 1861 and 1863. The current Forbes Post Office has been the centre of communications for Forbes for over a century, and is linked with the development of telegraph and telephone services to the region. The form and scale of Forbes Post Office also reflects the continued population growth during the 1870s and the confidence in the future of the town.

Forbes Post Office is aesthetically significant because it is an outstanding example of the Victorian Italianate style with Second Empire influence on the clock tower roof, and makes an important aesthetic contribution to the civic precinct in Forbes. Forbes Post Office is also representative of the work undertaken by the NSW Colonial Architect's Office under James Barnet

Forbes Post Office is also considered to be significant to the community of Forbes' sense of place.

Forbes Post Office was listed on the New South Wales State Heritage Register on 22 December 2000 having satisfied the following criteria.

The place is important in demonstrating the course, or pattern, of cultural or natural history in New South Wales.

Forbes Post Office is associated with the birth of the town, as it is linked with the original postal services established in 1861. As such, it is also associated with the discovery of gold in the area and the subsequent population explosion between 1861 and 1863. The current Forbes Post Office has been the centre of communications for Forbes for over a century and is linked with the extension of the telegraph service to the area in the early 1860s.

Forbes Post Office is also linked with the establishment of a branch of the Government Savings Bank in the town in 1871 in the original post office.

The form and scale of Forbes Post Office also reflects the continued population growth during the 1870s and the confidence in the future of the town.

Forbes Post Office provides evidence of the changing nature of postal and telecommunications practices in New South Wales.

Forbes Post Office was designed by the NSW Colonial Architect's Office under James Barnet, a key practitioner of the Victorian Italianate style of architecture. The Colonial Architect's Office under Barnet designed and maintained a number of post offices across NSW between 1865 and 1890.

The place is important in demonstrating aesthetic characteristics and/or a high degree of creative or technical achievement in New South Wales.

Forbes Post Office is aesthetically significant because it is a fine example of the Victorian Italianate style. The clock tower shows some Second Empire influence in the form of the mansard roof.

The scale, architectural style and location of the building, along with the prominent corner clock tower, also make it a focal point defining the centre of the civic precinct of Forbes, making it a local landmark.

Forbes Post Office is further distinguished by its successful combination of a corner tower and two-storey round arched arcades with terminating pavilions, comparing in these respects with Tamworth, Hay and Yass Post Offices.

The place has a strong or special association with a particular community or cultural group in New South Wales for social, cultural or spiritual reasons.

Forbes Post Office is a prominent civic building and a local landmark. It has been the centre of communications for the town for over a century, and has a long association with Forbes' postal services. As such, it is considered to be highly significant to the community of Forbes' sense of place.

The place has potential to yield information that will contribute to an understanding of the cultural or natural history of New South Wales.

The site also has some potential to contain archaeological information relating to the previous use of the site, including the first post office and adjacent fire station shown on the 1928 plans, (now part of this site), and the evolution of the building and out-buildings associated with use by the Post Office.

The place possesses uncommon, rare or endangered aspects of the cultural or natural history of New South Wales.

Forbes Post Office is an outstanding example of the work of the Colonial Architect's Office under James Barnet.

The place is important in demonstrating the principal characteristics of a class of cultural or natural places/environments in New South Wales.

Forbes Post Office is a particularly strong example of the Victorian Italianate style of architecture. It is representative of the work of the NSW Colonial Architect's Office under James Barnet.
