= Donkey vote =

Type of cast ballot in ranked voting

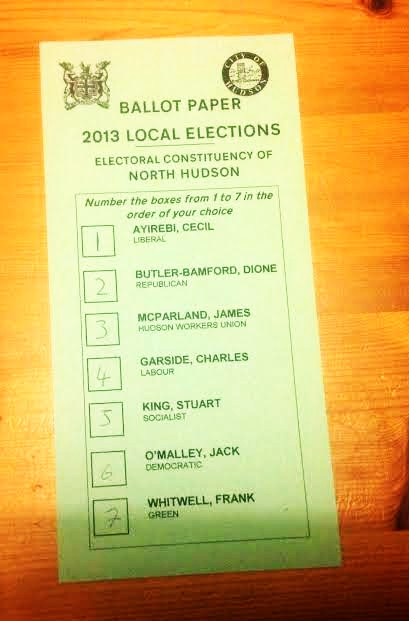
An example of a ballot paper on which the voter has allocated preference according to the order of the candidates listed

In electoral systems which use ranked voting, a donkey vote is a cast ballot where the voter ranks the candidates based on the order they appear on the ballot itself. The voter that votes in this manner is referred to as a donkey voter.

Typically, this involves numbering the candidates in the order they appear on the ballot paper: first preference for the first-listed candidate, second preference for the second-listed candidate, and so on. However, donkey votes can also occur in reverse, such that someone numbers the candidates from the bottom up the ballot paper. In systems where a voter is required to place a number against each candidate for the vote to be valid, the voter may give the first preference to the candidate they prefer, then run all the other numbers donkeywise.

Donkey votes are most common where preference voting is combined with compulsory voting, such as in Australia, particularly where all candidates must be ranked on the ballot paper. There are different versions of the phenomenon applicable in the Parliament of Australia and in the Australian jurisdictions that use the Hare–Clark electoral system.

Donkey votes may occur for several reasons, including voter apathy, protest voting, simplicity on how-to-vote cards, the complexity of the voting system, or voter ignorance of the voting system rules. Sometimes, what appears as a donkey vote may in fact be a genuine representation of a voter's preferences.

== Manifestation in compulsory preferential voting systems ==
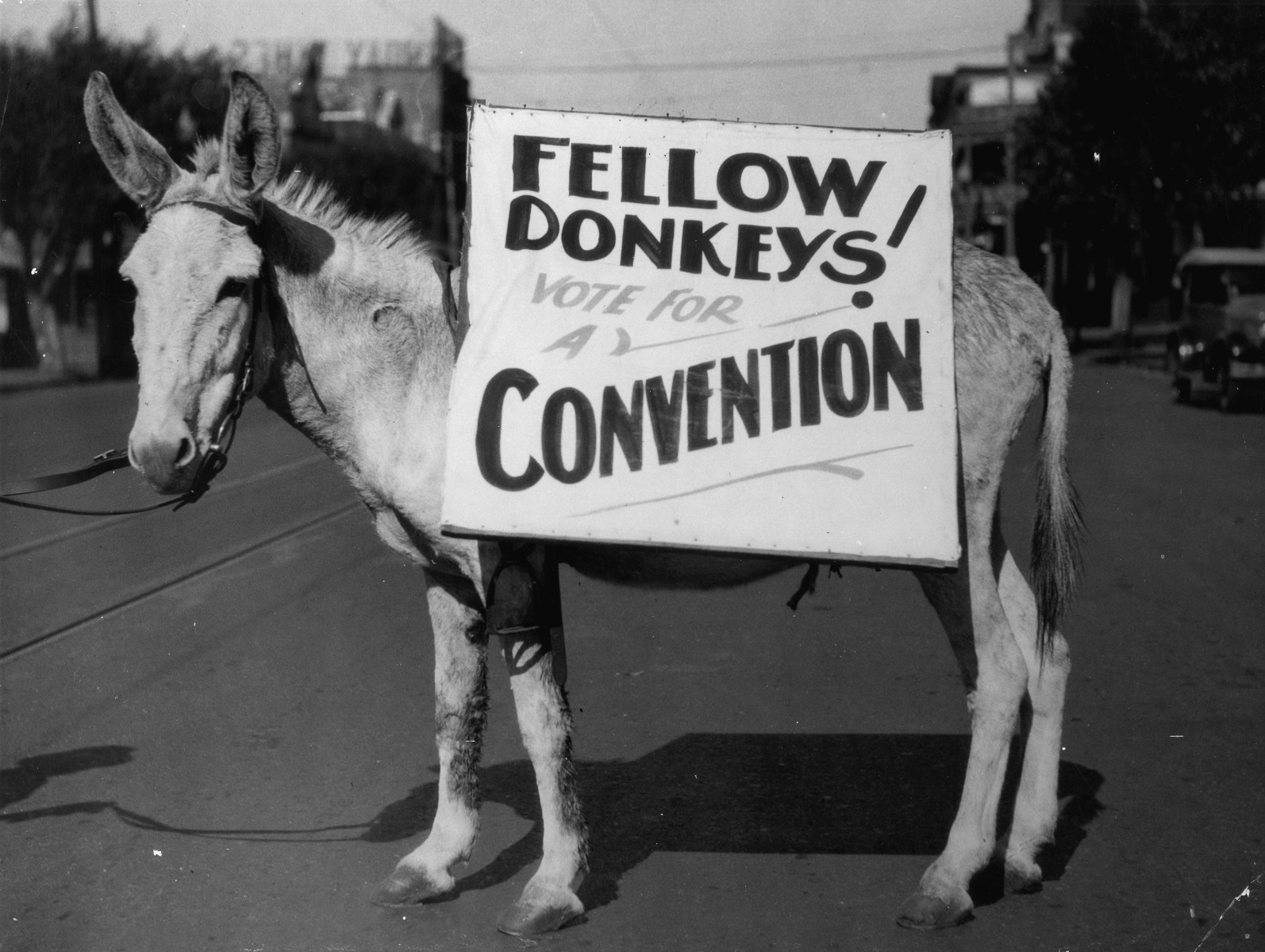
Stunt spoofing the phrase "donkey vote" at the 1933 Western Australian secession referendum

=== Australian House of Representatives ===
Preferential voting for a single seat is used in elections for the Federal House of Representatives (since 1918), for all mainland State lower houses, and for the Northern Territory Legislative Assembly. It was also used for the Western Australian Legislative Council until 1986, and the Victorian Legislative Council until 2006; it is still used for the Tasmanian Legislative Council. A variant was used for the South Australian Legislative Council before 1973, with two seats per "province" (electoral district) being filled at each election, but by majority-preferential voting, not by proportional representation.

The donkey vote has been estimated at between 1 and 2% of the vote, which could be critical in a marginal seat. In a 2010 review, the Victorian Election Commission noted that:

Candidates are pleased if they get the top spot on the ballot paper when the draw for position takes place, because they will have the advantage of the donkey vote.

==== Attempt to reduce the impact of donkey votes ====
In 1983, reforms were made to Federal electoral legislation to reduce the impact of donkey voting including:

- listing of party names besides each candidate (as for the examples below for the Divisions of Gwydir and Grayndler);
- the order of candidates on the ballot paper being decided randomly by the Australian Electoral Commission returning officer after the close of nominations and the commencement of pre-poll voting – candidates were previously listed by alphabetical order.

==== 2005 Werriwa by-election ====
The by-election for the Federal electorate of Werriwa, held on 19 March 2005, following the resignation of Federal Labor leader Mark Latham, provides a good example for understanding the nature of donkey voting.

At this by-election, 16 candidates were nominated. This large number of candidates led to an increased incentive to cast a donkey vote. Every candidate that issued how-to-vote cards used some variation of the donkey vote when instructing their voters how to mark preferences, presumably to simplify the task of voting, made onerous by needing to vote for 16 candidates, many with no public profile. Candidates generally allocated their first few preferences and last few preferences to candidates according to their wishes, then numbered the rest of the boxes from top to bottom or bottom to top. For example, The Greens advocated the following preferences:

15	Woodger, Janey (Australians Against Further Immigration)
1	Raue, Ben (The Greens)
14	Young, James (Independent)
13	Lees, Mal (Independent)
3	Hayes, Chris (Australian Labor Party)
12	Vogler, Robert (Independent)
11	Tan, Greg (Christian Democratic Party)
10	Bryant, Joe (Independent)
16	Doggett, Charles (One Nation)
9	Head, Mike
8	Sykes, Mick (Family First)
7	Bargshoon, Sam (Independent)
2	McGookin, Pat (Progressive Labour Party)
6	Locke, Deborah
5	Aussie-Stone, Marc (Independent)
4	Mannoun, Ned

In this case, the how-to-vote card advocated a first preference for the Greens, a second preference for the Progressive Labour Party, a third preference for Labor and a last preference for One Nation. Apart from these preferences, the card advocates a reverse donkey vote.

The donkey vote was also reflected in the high vote (4.83%) for Australians Against Further Immigration, who probably would normally gain far fewer votes, but were placed first on the ballot.

==== 2020 Eden-Monaro by-election ====
The 2020 Eden-Monaro by-election also had a 14 candidate field that was also impacted by the "long form" donkey vote according to analysis from Antony Green. Labor candidate Kristy McBain drew position 8 while Liberal candidate Fiona Kotvojs drew the 14th and final position. Unlike most general election seats where only one of the two Coalition partners will stand, in this by-election The Nationals also stood and drew 5. The right wing agrarian Shooters, Fishers and Farmers Party were drawn in the first position and won a larger share of primary votes than they would have further down the ballot. This resulted in the Labor Party gaining an electorally significant amount of 2 party preferred preferences over the Liberal Party. This happened with normal preference flows where small numbers of right wing Nationals and SFF voters preference the centre-left Labor rather than the Liberal Party, and then through donkey votes both as straight 1 to 14 ballots, and "long form" donkey votes where minor candidate primary voters completed a down-ballot donkey vote, both types giving their final preference to Labor.

Labor won by 735 votes. Antony Green's analysis of the preference flows believed that had the Liberal and Labor positions been swapped, there would have been 368 two party preferred votes that would have swapped. This would have caused the final count to be 47,468 to the Liberal Party and 47,467 to Labor, a one vote win for the Liberals and a historical victory by taking a seat off an opposition party during a by-election, an event that had not happened since 1920.

During Antony Green's election night summary for the 2025 Australian federal election, Green referenced this election as an example how luck and the donkey vote can impact politics. The Labor leader at the time of the by-election was Anthony Albanese, who had been in charge for a year and losing the seat would have destabilised his leadership and perhaps caused a subsequent Leadership spill. Holding the seat instead enabled him to avoid any leadership change discussion, maintain the momentum of the Labor party in opposition and he continued into the 2022 Australian federal election, winning and becoming Prime Minister of Australia, which he followed 3 years later with a thumping landslide victory in the 2025 Australian federal election.

=== Australian Senate ===
The Australian Senate had a preferential system between 1919 and 1949. From 1934, to elect a State's three senators at a periodic Senate poll, voters had to mark their preference order among the candidates listed on the ballot paper against the names of each of the candidates (with consecutive integers beginning from 1). Candidates could be listed in groups, but voters could choose any order of candidates regardless of their grouping, because Section 7 of the Constitution provides that senators must be directly chosen by the people. Within each group, the candidates were listed in alphabetical order, and the groups were listed in what was called "ranked alphabetical order", which ensured that a group in which all surnames started with "A" would be at the top of the ballot paper if there were no other group with that feature. The groups were not identified by a party name, but just shown as Group A, Group B, etc. Donkey voters, by definition, marked their earliest preferences against the candidates in Group A, so a group that appeared in that position had an inbuilt electoral advantage.

At the election of senators for New South Wales in 1937, Labor's group featured four candidates named Amour, Ashley, Armstrong and Arthur—all of the "Four A's" were duly elected. This prompted the Commonwealth Electoral Act 1940, which replaced that ballot paper layout with one closer to the present layout where the order of candidates' names within each group was determined by those candidates' mutual consent, which in practice means it is determined by the party organization.

The Chifley Government introduced proportional representation for the Australian Senate in 1948. Candidates were listed alphabetically in party order and the position of the parties candidates on the ballot paper was determined by lot after the close of nominations.

In large states such as New South Wales and Victoria, there were at times over 100 candidates on the ballot paper, with voters required to list each candidate in order of preference. Consequently, there was a high percentage of informal votes and donkey votes cast in Senate elections.

As a result, electoral reforms were introduced in 1983 allowing voters an alternative of voting 1 above the line for the party of their choice, with preferences being distributed according to a ticket lodged with the Australian Electoral Commission prior to the commencement of voting. This reform has greatly reduced the incidence of donkey voting and informal voting in Australian Senate elections.

However, this system has led to a great increase of horse trading by parties in the development of the distribution of preferences as it makes the difference in deciding who fills the final few positions in the Senate representing that State. For example, the election of Steve Fielding of the Family First Party in the Victorian Senate election in 2004 with a party vote of 1.88% resulted from horse-trading associated with this process. States that use proportional representation to elect their upper houses such as New South Wales use a similar system to the Senate.

=== Victorian Local Government General Elections ===
Every four years General Elections are typically held for every Local Government Councillor's position. Electors must provide a clear indication of preferences for all candidates, the alternative is an invalid ballot. The size of Candidate fields standing for election in wards has varied from 1 up to 41 Candidates. There is no optional preferencing, typically no grouping of Candidates with an above the line voting option, nor any attempt to minimize donkey vote impacts with a Robson Rotation.

The minimum information supplied to an elector by the Victorian Electoral Commission (VEC) is a Candidate Information Sheet with every postal vote packet. Each candidate has the option to provide a photograph and a 200 Word submission.

The Tasmanian Electoral Commission (TEC) investigated donkey vote variations cast in two Tasmanian local government elections. The results were published in the Robson Rotation Discussion Paper and included:

Local government elections

Ballot papers from the 2002 Latrobe and Meander Valley Council elections were examined. The survey of all formal ballot papers found:

- 1.4% of the ballot papers were full linear votes.
- 0.4% of the ballot papers were full linear votes going in the reverse direction (bottom to top).
- 2.4% of the ballot papers were full circular votes.
- 27.5% of the ballot papers showed only the minimum five preferences and 66.4% of ballot papers showed a preference for all 14 candidates. Only 6.1% voted for an in between number of candidates.
- 27.9% of the ballot papers contained partial linear voting. That is, voters casting their first few preferences with apparent care, and then filling in the remaining boxes in a straight sequence up or down the ballot paper.

The simplistic donkey vote definitions used by the Australian Electoral Commission (AEC) and the Victorian Electoral Commission (VEC) do not include partial linear voting (includes a donkey vote component). The VEC after every election reports to the Victorian Parliament but does not canvas the issues related to bias from donkey vote variations. There has never been any analysis that can be cited for VEC Local Government election results.

In a submission to the "Inquiry into the 2022 federal election" in August 2022, Page, G conducted a statistical analysis of Victorian Local Government Elections from 2008 to 2021. This analysis concluded that in a ballot with 5 or more candidates, 45% more candidates with the number 1 position would be elected than would be expected in a fair election. This effect becomes even more pronounced in ballots with larger fields of candidates. Page, G notes that while these effects are more pronounced in Local Government elections due to their propensity for large fields of candidates, commonly 2 to 18 up to a maximum of 41 candidates, donkey voting has the potential to influence votes in all Australian elections that do not implement mitigations.

=== Elections using the single transferable vote ===
Two Australian jurisdictions use the single transferable vote, also known as the Hare–Clark proportional representation system: the Tasmanian House of Assembly and the Australian Capital Territory Legislative Assembly (the latter being a unicameral system). Tasmania has used Hare–Clark since 1907, and the Australian Capital Territory since 1995.

In Tasmania, candidates used to be listed in alphabetical order within a party column, leading to a donkey vote effect. For their ballots to be valid, voters only need to number as many candidates as there are vacancies to be filled, although they are free to number all the candidates if they wish.

However, it was observed that often a candidate whose name appeared below the name of a popular candidate (such as a State party leader) would be elected on the leader's second preferences. As popular leaders such as Robin Gray, Kate Carnell or Jon Stanhope have achieved several quotas of first-preference votes in their own right at the height of their popularity, the impact of this position can lead to candidates being elected on the leaders' "coat-tails". A similar phenomenon has been observed in Ireland and Malta, which also use single transferable vote (with candidates ranked alphabetically).

In 1979, Neil Robson, a Liberal member for Bass in the Tasmanian parliament, introduced the system known as Robson Rotation. Under this system, each ballot paper contains a different permutation of candidates so each candidate has a certain percentage of instances at every position in their party's column, therefore equally dispersing the donkey votes and nullifying their impact on the result as to which of a party's candidates is favoured, but allowing the party as a whole to be properly benefited.

== Manifestation in other electoral systems ==
Donkey votes have been observed in democracies other than Australia, even those without compulsory preferential voting, although the presence of these two factors in Australia makes the phenomenon more visible.

In systems where voting is not compulsory, it seems counter-intuitive that many who attend the polls would be apathetic. However, there may be countervailing factors that produce a "donkey vote" even with voluntary turnout. In many US elections, a voter may well be intensely interested in (e.g.) the Presidential contest but not in other, less prominent races on the same "long ballot".

Since most non-preferential elections require the voter to mark only one single candidate, or one single party list, it becomes impossible to speculate how many votes for the first candidate or party on the ballot are genuine supporters and how many are donkey votes.

In some elections (e.g. Germany and some US states), the order of parties on the ballot is in descending order of their support at the previous election (with new parties being placed lowest in random order). Such a system makes high ballot position both a cause and an effect of high electoral support.

=== United States ===
Donkey voting shows up in US state elections that use the "long ballot" for numerous offices, or in multi-seat elections where there are several candidates from the same party. In his book The Rise of Guardian Democracy: The Supreme Court's Role in Voting Rights, 1845–1969 (Massachusetts: Harvard UP, 1974), Ward E.Y. Elliott notes:

"One long-time Democrat precinct captain in Denver noted that, besides having party or lobby support, a candidate had to rank high in the ballot list. Since ballot ranking was alphabetical, most of the eight Denver [district State] Senators had names beginning with A, B or C." (p 362, citing appellants' brief in Lucas v Colorado).

In 1990, when former Republican senator Lowell Weicker ran for governor of Connecticut outside of the two main American political parties (Republican and Democratic), he intentionally named his party "A Connecticut Party" so as to fall alphabetically first on the ballot. He won the election.

In the 2018 North Carolina Supreme Court election, a rule change resulted in the order of the names on the ballot differing from previous years. The Charlotte Observer claimed that "Studies have shown ballot order favors the candidate listed first, and could make a difference in a close race", even though the State has first-past-the-post voting with voluntary turnout.

=== Ireland ===
In Ireland, where voting is preferential but not compulsory, the donkey vote has its greatest effect not between parties but within them. With an alphabetical list of candidates, and several candidates from each major party for the three to five seats per district, the proportion of Dáil Éireann deputies with surnames A to M is typically much higher than 50%, whereas it is only about half the population (according to the Irish telephone directory). In O'Reilly v Minister for Environment, the Irish High Court upheld the constitutional validity of alphabetical listing against an equality-rights challenge, noting that despite its faults, A to Z does have the advantage of making it easy to find candidates on the ballot-paper.
