= Stan Amour =

Australian politician (1900–1979)

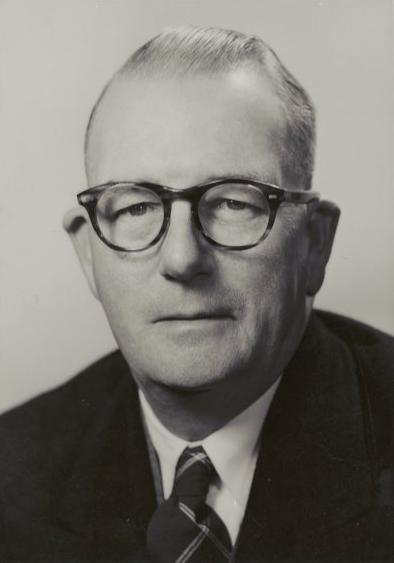

Senator for New South Wales
- In office 1 July 1938 – 30 June 1965

Personal details
- Born: 2 April 1900 Hamilton, New South Wales
- Died: 20 November 1979 (aged 79) Concord, New South Wales, Australia
- Party: Labor
- Other political affiliations: Non-Communist Labor (1940–41)
- Spouse: Jessie Jones (m. 1918)
- Occupation: Soldier; Insurance agent

Stanley Kerin Amour (2 April 1900 – 29 November 1979) was an Australian politician. Born in Hamilton, New South Wales, he was educated at Catholic schools before becoming an insurance agent. He served in the military from 1915 to 1917. In 1937, he was elected to the Australian Senate as a Labor Senator for New South Wales. He was selected largely because his surname began with A, as did the other three candidates, Bill Ashley, John Armstrong and Tom Arthur. After leaving the ALP briefly for the Langite Australian Labor Party (Non-Communist), Amour served in the Senate for over 20 years, retiring in 1965. He died in 1979.

== Early life ==
Amour was born on 2 April 1900 in Newcastle, New South Wales. He was the son of Elizabeth (née Thompson) and Richard John Amour. His father was a signalman with New South Wales Government Railways.

Amour spent part of his childhood in Murrurundi and attended the Sacred Heart School in Hamilton. He enlisted in the Australian Imperial Force (AIF) in August 1915, aged 15, lying about his age to do so. He saw active service with the 18th Battalion on the Western Front and was badly wounded in June 1916, after which he was evacuated to England. Amour was invalided back to Australia in May 1917 and discharged as medically unfit in August 1917. His injuries rendered him unable to speak for a period and he retained shrapnel in his back for several years.

After returning to Australia, Amour worked for periods as a cleaner and insurance agent. He was involved in the labour movement from the late 1920s and was involved in the 1929 timber workers' strike alongside his future parliamentary colleague Sol Rosevear. He was eventually granted a full ex-serviceman's disability pension in respect of his injuries.

== Politics ==
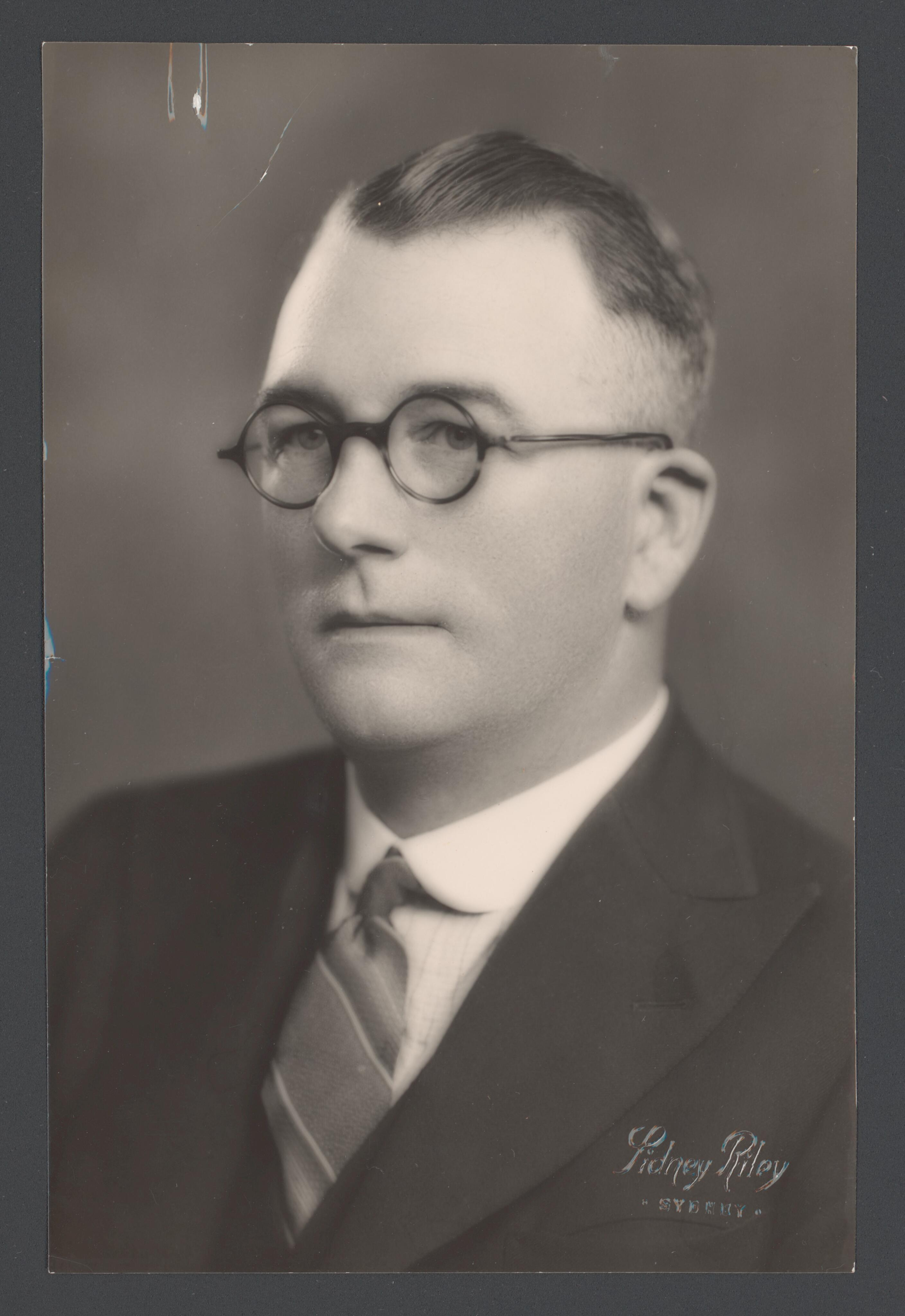
Amour in 1938

=== Early involvement ===
Amour joined the ALP's Leichhardt branch in 1927. He was later secretary and president of the South Bankstown branch and a state conference delegate. He served as an alderman on the Bankstown Municipal Council from 1932 to 1944.

=== Senate ===
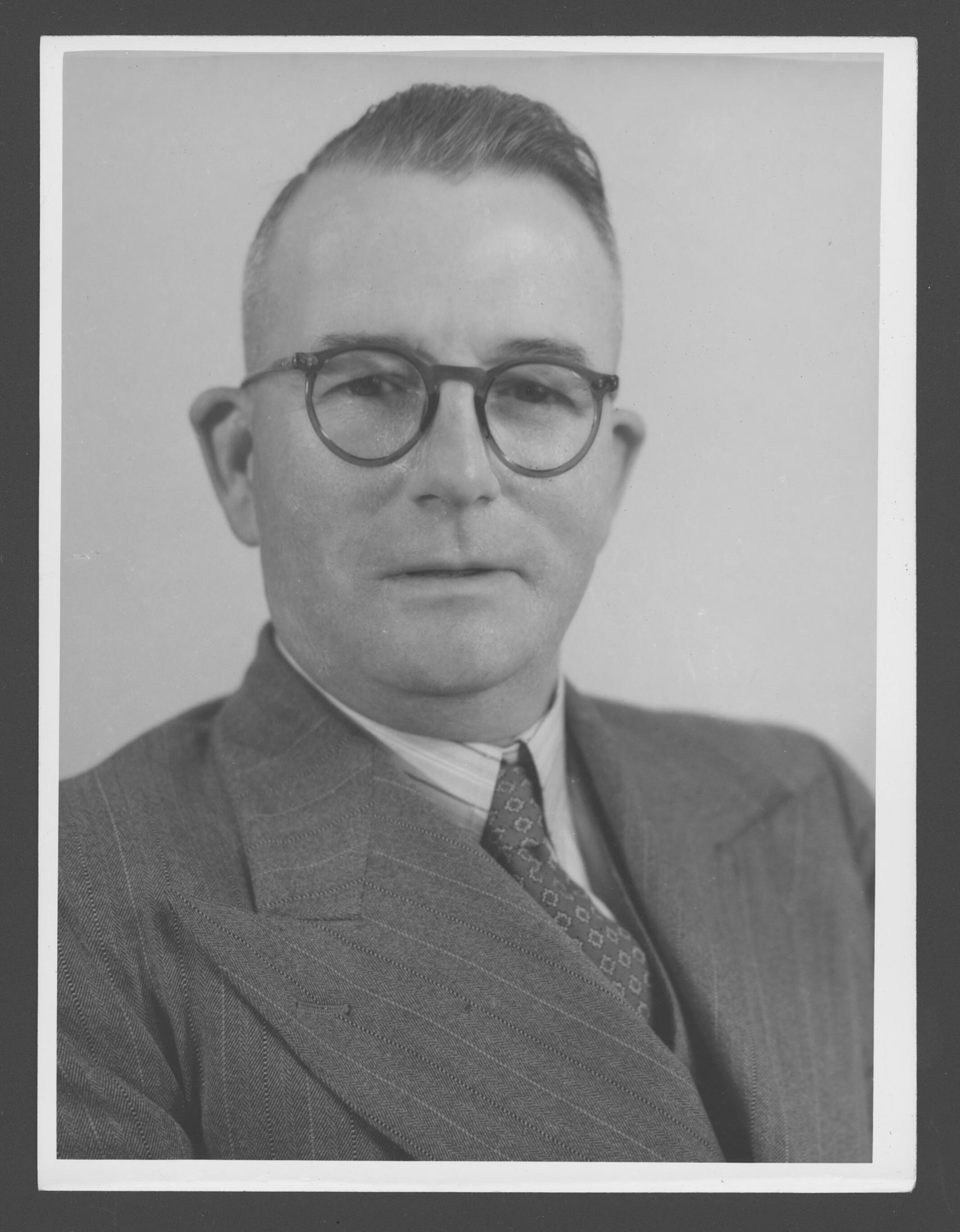
Amour c. 1945

At the 1937 federal election, Amour was elected to a six-year Senate term commencing on 1 July 1938. He was one of the "four A's" on the ALP's Senate ticket in New South Wales, along with John Armstrong, Tom Arthur, and Bill Ashley. The party took advantage of electoral legislation which required candidates to be listed alphabetical on the ballot paper, hoping to secure the donkey vote.

In 1940, Amour and Armstrong were the only Labor senators to defect to Jack Lang's breakaway Australian Labor Party (Non-Communist). They re-joined the ALP caucus in March 1941 after lobbying from John Curtin.

Amour replaced Arthur Calwell as chairman of the Joint Standing Committee on Broadcasting in 1943. The committee recommended that parliamentary proceedings should be broadcast live on radio, a recommendation adopted with effect from 1946. The committee was also responsible for supervising the Australian Broadcasting Commission (ABC), where it "acquired a reputation for heavy-handed interference in programming" and came into conflict with ABC managing director Charles Moses.

In May 1947, Amour and Eddie Ward were chosen by the Chifley government to lead the Australian delegation to the International Labour Conference in Switzerland. In September 1947, following their return, Country Party MP Joe Abbott alleged under parliamentary privilege that Amour had been removed by American police from a plane in San Francisco after drunkenly kicking a fellow passenger and attempting to punch the pilot. Amour denied the allegations and stated that Abbott had misused parliamentary privilege, also criticising what he described as "journalistic sadists" who had spread the story. Abbott subsequently submitted testimony from the flight's passengers to the House of Representatives and challenged Prime Minister Ben Chifley to hold an inquiry into the allegations.

Amour made his last parliamentary speech in 1959 and suffered from ill health during his final years in the Senate, although he rarely missed votes. In 1960, Don Whitington wrote in The Canberra Times that he had been a "political nonentity for a decade". He ultimately announced his retirement due to ill health in 1964, with his term expiring on 30 June 1965.

== Personal life ==
Amour married Jessie Eileen Jones in 1918, with whom he had five children. He was 18 years old at the time of their wedding and lied about his age on the marriage certificate. They married in Armidale but later returned to Sydney, living in Leichhardt for a period before settling in a war service home in Padstow in 1929.

Amour died on 29 November 1979 at the Concord Repatriation General Hospital.
