= Grant Bartholomaeus =

Australian rules footballer

Personal information
- Full name: Grant Bartholomaeus
- Born: 17 May 1968 (age 58)
- Original teams: Forbes & Langhorne Creek
- Height: 178 cm (5 ft 10 in)
- Weight: 84 kg (185 lb)

Playing career^{1}
Years	Club	Games (Goals)
1986 – 87	Sydney	4 (0)
- ^{1} Playing statistics correct to the end of 1987.

Grant Bartholomaeus (born 17 May 1968) is a former Australian rules footballer who represented the Sydney Swans in the Victorian Football League (VFL) during the 1986 and 1987 seasons.

Bartholomaeus played just four games for the club before being delisted at the end of the 87 season.
