= Forbes, New South Wales =

Forbes
- Town
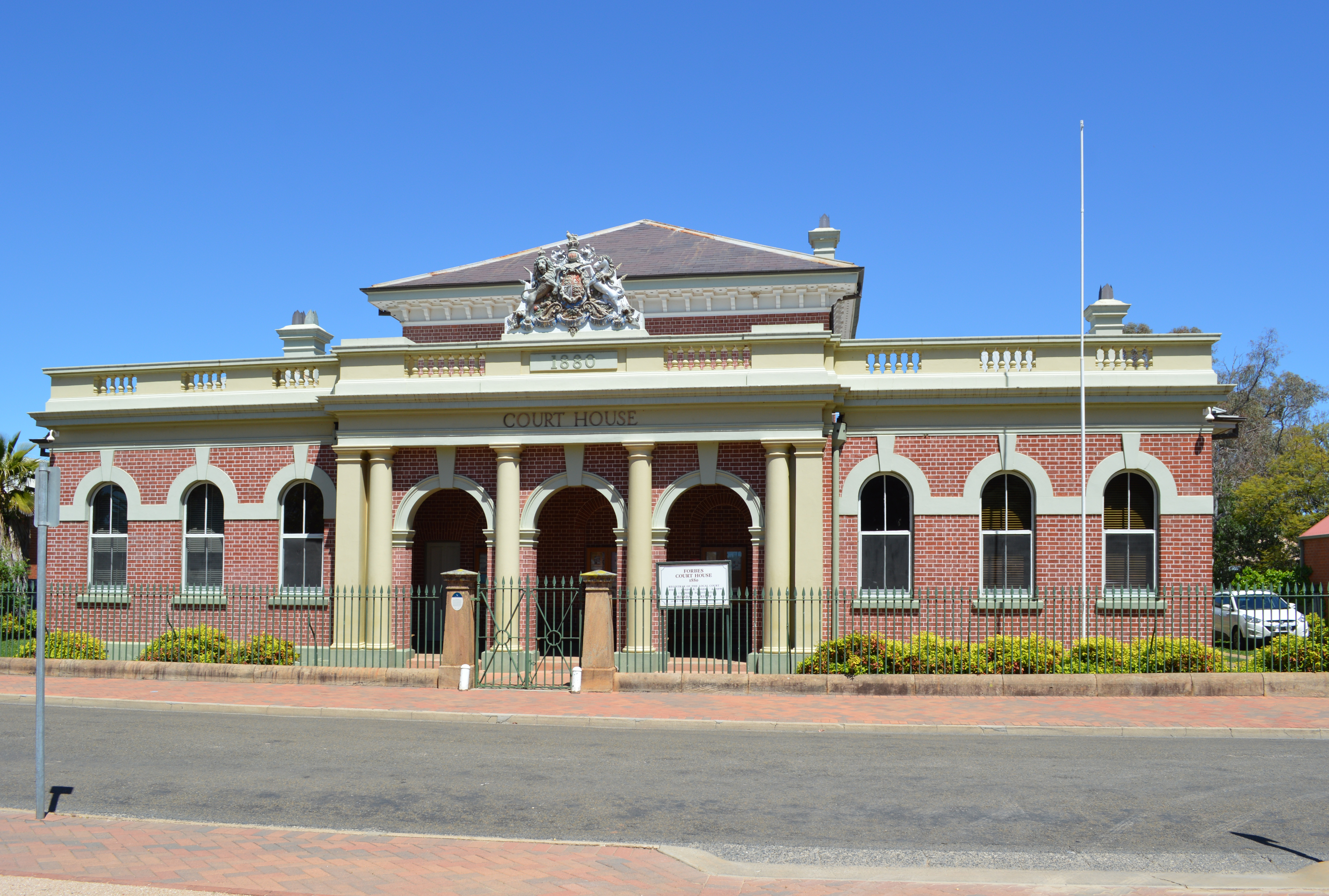
- Court house built in 1880

- Coordinates: 33°23′0″S 148°01′0″E
- Country: Australia
- State: New South Wales
- LGA: Forbes Shire Council
- Location: 374 km (232 mi) W of Sydney; 33 km (21 mi) SSW of Parkes; 118 km (73 mi) W of Orange; 104 km (65 mi) NE of West Wyalong
- Established: 1861

Government
  - State electorate: Orange
  - Federal division: Parkes
- Elevation: 245 m (804 ft)

Population
  - Total: 6,319 (2021 census)
- Postcode: 2871
- County: Ashburnham
- Mean max temp: 23.8 °C (74.8 °F)
- Mean min temp: 10.0 °C (50.0 °F)
- Annual rainfall: 526.3 mm (20.72 in)

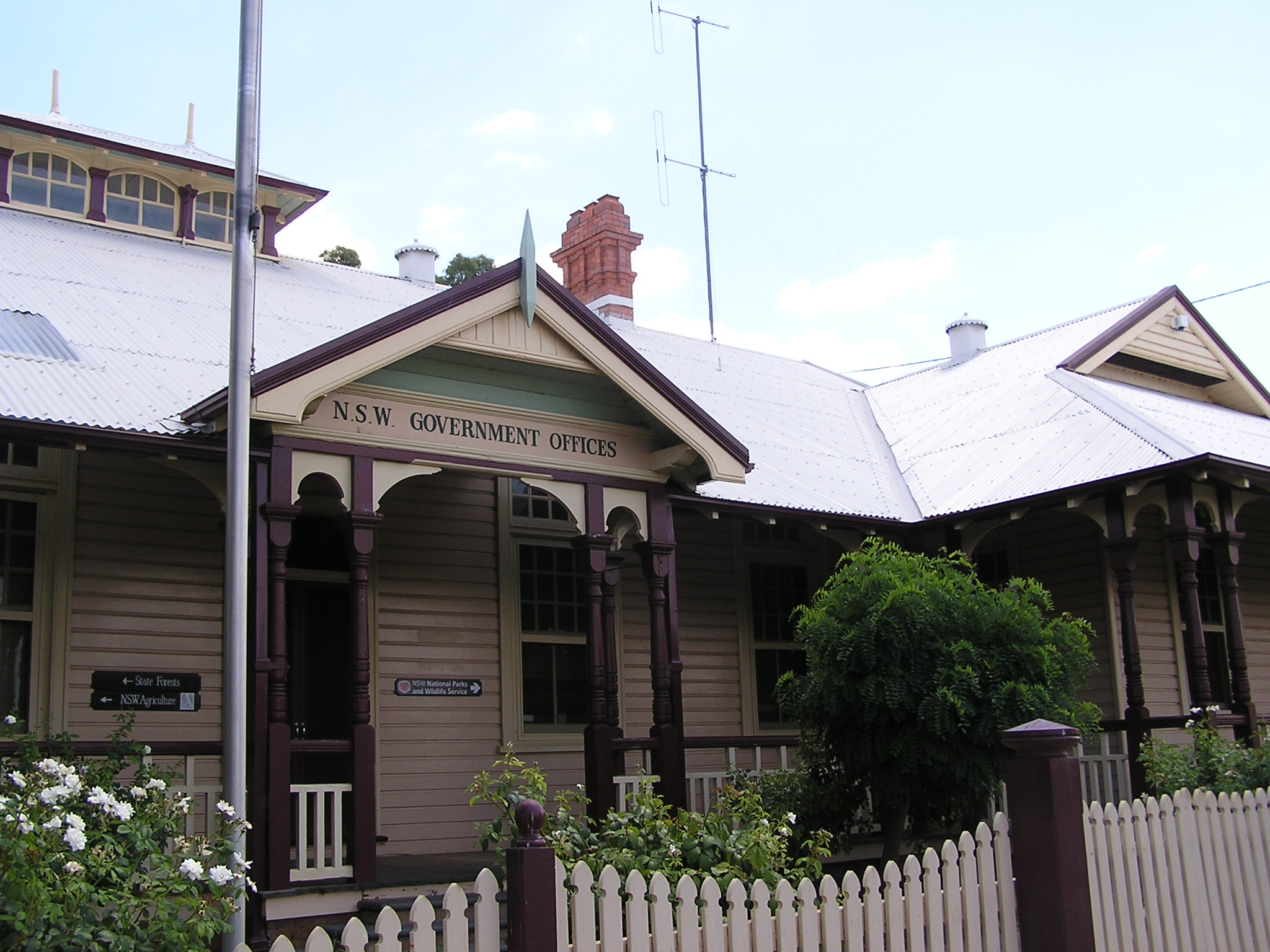
Lands Office at Forbes built 1898; an all timber building in the Federation style

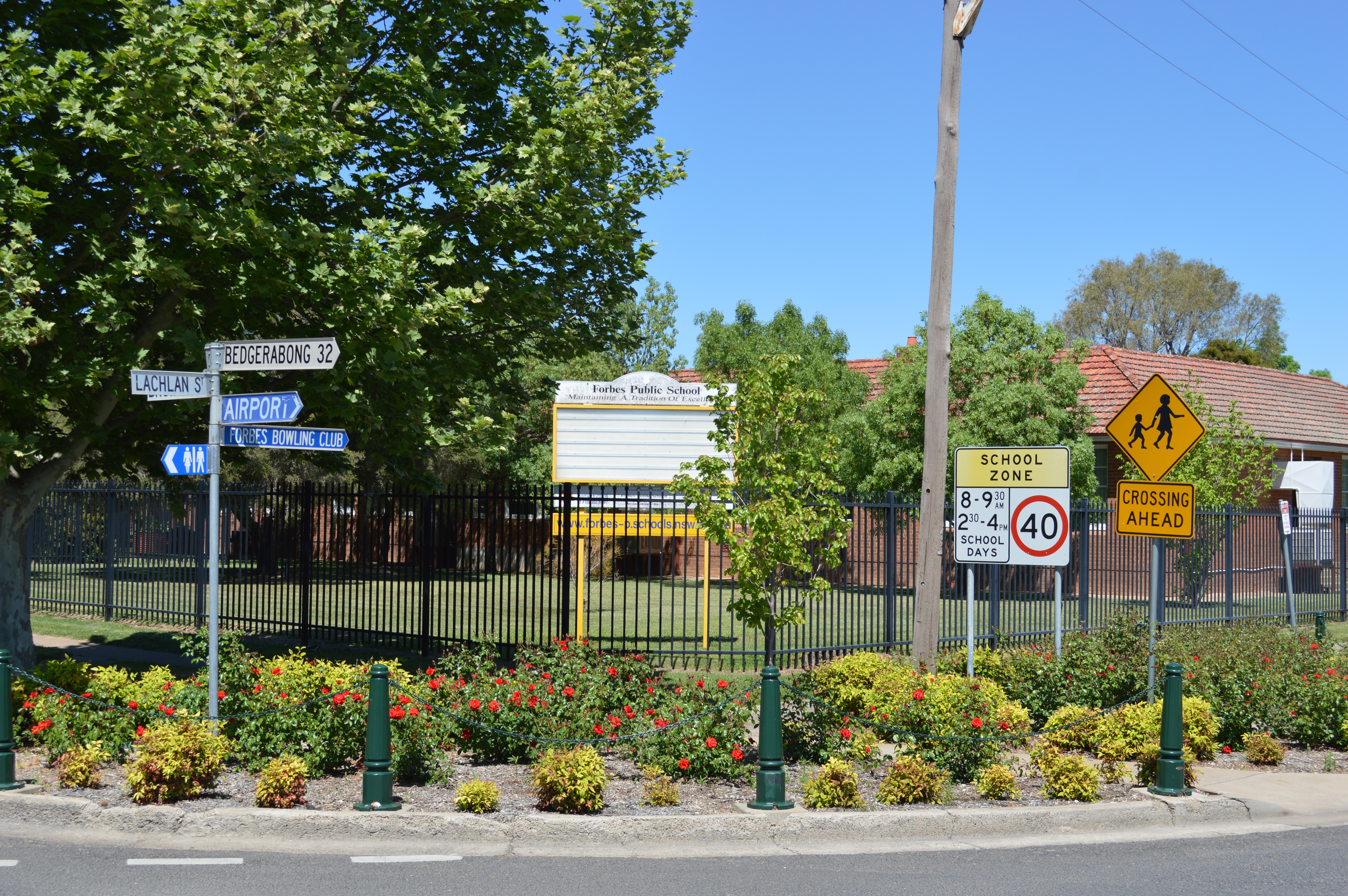
Forbes Public School

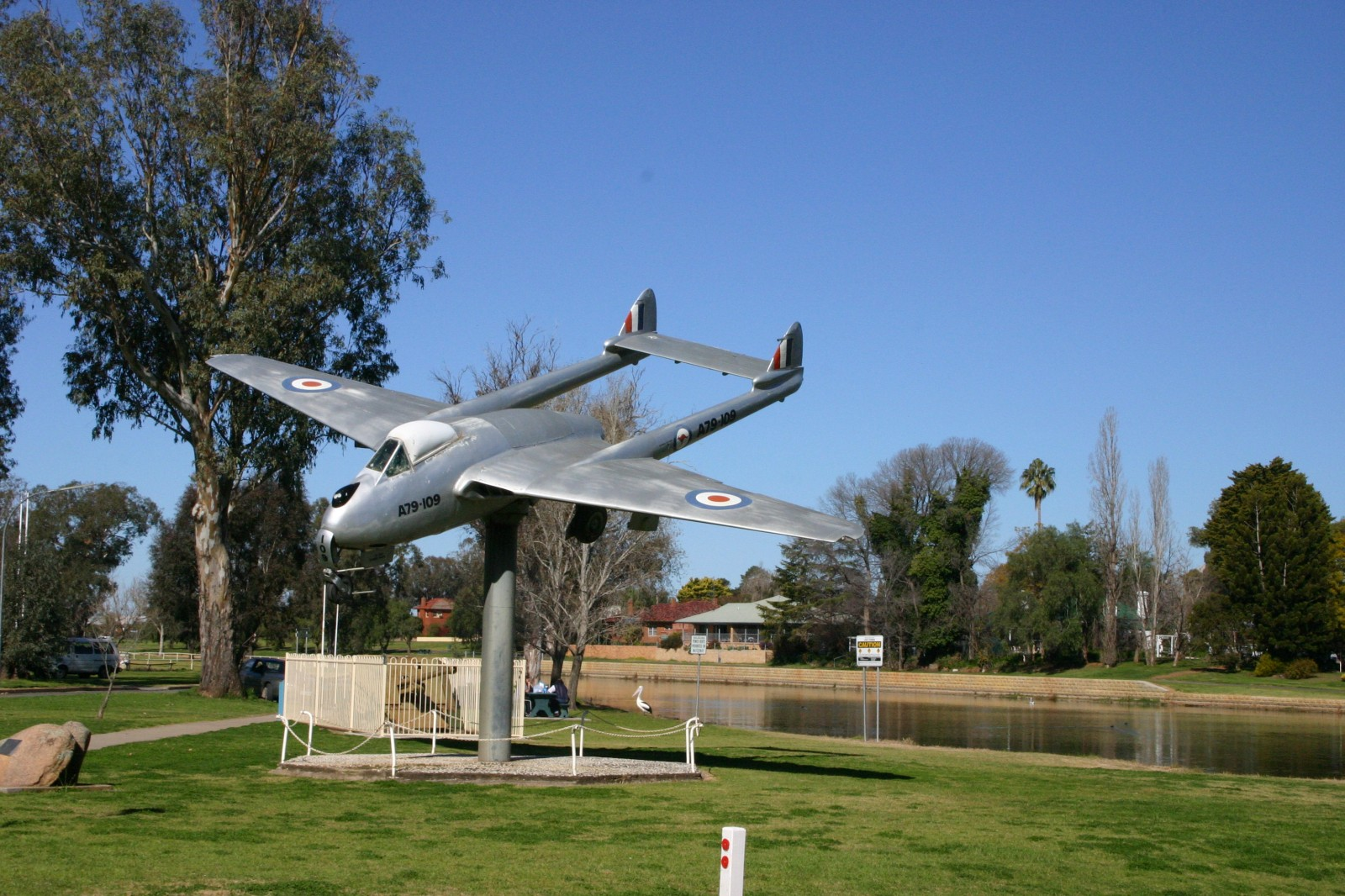
de Havilland Vampire monument next to Lake Forbes

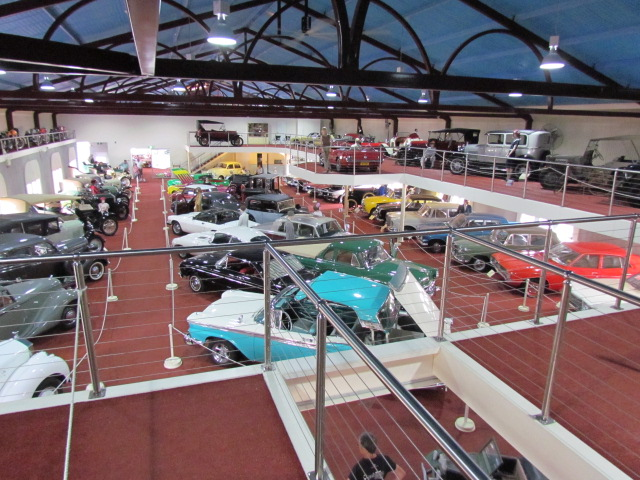
McFeeter's Car Museum

Forbes is a town in the Central West region of New South Wales, Australia, located on the Newell Highway between Parkes and West Wyalong. According to the 2021 census, Forbes has a population of 6,319. Forbes is probably named after Sir Francis Forbes, first Chief Justice of NSW.

Located on the banks of the Lachlan River, Forbes is 245 metres (804 ft) above sea-level and about 380 kilometres (240 mi) west of Sydney. The district is a cropping area where wheat and similar crops are grown. Nearby towns and villages include Calarie, Parkes, Bedgerebong, Bundabarrah, Corradgery, Daroobalgie, Eugowra, Ooma North and Paytens Bridge. Forbes is subject to a pattern of flooding, generally occurring to a significant level once every seven years, including 2016 and 2022.

== History ==
The area was home to the Wiradjuri people before non-indigenous settlement. John Oxley passed through in 1817 during one of the first inland expeditions. Oxley named the site Camp Hill. He was unimpressed with the clay soil, poor timber and swamps and he concluded, it is impossible to imagine a worse country. The first settlers moved into the district in 1834.

Gold was discovered by Harry Stephan, also known as "German Harry", in June 1861. Initially about 30,000 people moved to the goldfields, but by 1863 this had declined to about 3,500 because of the difficult mining conditions. The Post Office was opened on 1 December 1861 and given the name Black Ridge in response to the demand for postal services by those involved with the gold rush along the Lachlan River. That name was changed before opening. The Forbes Telegraph Office opened on 27 October 1862 after a telegraph line had been constructed from Orange. The two offices merged on 1 January 1870. On opening day of the Telegraph Office in 1862, the results of three days of races at the Lachlan Gold Fields were telegraphed to Bathurst.

The goldfields were originally named "Black Ridge", and the name "Forbes" celebrating Sir Francis Forbes was declared from Sydney as the result of a possible government administrative error. It is said that the name was meant for the town now known as "Hill End" between Orange and Mudgee, where gold was discovered around a similar time. Gold was initially found in the area known as Halpin's Flat. The Albion Hotel, once a Cobb and Co. stage coach stop, had tunnels situated underneath which were used during the gold rush to convey gold and money to and from the banks to minimise the chance of theft. The Albion Hotel burnt down on 10 February 2009, losing years worth of history and memorabilia.

One of Australia's most renowned bushrangers, Ben Hall, was shot dead in an early morning police ambush about 20 kilometres (12 mi) to the north-west of Forbes on 5 May 1865. Hall and his gang were famous for stealing 77 kilograms (170 lb) of gold and £3,700 from the nearby town of Eugowra in 1862. He is buried in Forbes Cemetery.

Kate Kelly, the sister of bushranger Ned Kelly, lived in the town. She drowned in Lake Forbes while saving an Aboriginal child during a flood in 1898 and was found in a lagoon of the Lachlan River, just outside Forbes. She is buried in Forbes Cemetery.

== Heritage listings ==
Forbes has a number of heritage-listed sites, including:

- Billabong Creek, Ben Halls Road: Ben Hall's Death Site
- Forbes Cemetery, Bogan Gate Road: Grave of Ben Hall
- 118 Lachlan Street: Forbes Post Office
- Parkes-Stockinbingal railway: Forbes railway station

== Demographics ==
According to the 2021 census of Population, there are 9,319 people in Forbes.

- Aboriginal and Torres Strait Islander people made up 13.3% of the population, with 7.9% not stating if they are Indigenous or not
- 86.6% of people were born in Australia and 89.7% of people spoke only English at home.
- The most common responses for religion were Catholic 31.9%, No Religion 25.4 and Anglican at 20.8%
- For those aged 15+ the Participation in the labour force is as follows, In the Labour force 57.7%, Not in the Labour force 33.6% and Not stated 8.7%

== Transport ==
The Stockinbingal–Parkes railway line passes through Forbes. Passenger trains operated to Forbes until 1983. Forbes lies at or near the confluence of the Newell Highway, the Lachlan Valley Way and Henry Lawson Way.

== Education ==
Forbes Shire has four public primary schools: Forbes Primary School, Forbes North Primary School, Corinella Public School and Bedgerebong Public School. There is one Catholic primary school which is St Laurence's Parish School.

Forbes High School, a public school, is located to the north of town.

Red Bend Catholic College at Forbes is a co-educational secondary school, with the school located at the site of the former Marist Brothers' College, on the banks of the Lachlan River.

Local tertiary institutions are the Forbes College of Technical and Further Education (TAFE) and the Forbes Conservatorium.

== Sport ==
The Forbes Camel Races have been held annually since 2001 on Good Friday at the Forbes Racecourse.

== Climate ==
Forbes lies in the transitional zones of the cold semi-arid climate (BSk) and humid subtropical climates (Cfa), with a large temperature variation between seasons, and moderate rainfall spread evenly throughout the year. Extreme temperatures have ranged from 47.8 °C (118.0 °F) on 11 January 1882, to −5.6 °C (21.9 °F) on both 11 July 1958 and 15 June 1959; the warmest minimum was 32.2 °C (90.0 °F) on 24 January 1896; and the coolest maximum, 3.3 °C (37.9 °F) on 27 June 1904.

Notwithstanding its northerly latitude and low elevation of just 240 metres (790 ft), snow has been known to fall on a few occasions—one of which saw a daily snowfall total of 9 inches (23 cm) on 5 July 1900. It is considerably sunny with 133.2 clear days annually.

Climate data for Forbes (Camp Street, 1873–1998); 240 m AMSL; 33.39° S, 148.01° E
Month	Jan	Feb	Mar	Apr	May	Jun	Jul	Aug	Sep	Oct	Nov	Dec	Year
Record high °C (°F)	47.8 (118.0)	44.7 (112.5)	42.2 (108.0)	36.7 (98.1)	30.8 (87.4)	24.5 (76.1)	25.0 (77.0)	29.4 (84.9)	34.6 (94.3)	39.4 (102.9)	42.9 (109.2)	45.6 (114.1)	47.8 (118.0)
Mean daily maximum °C (°F)	32.7 (90.9)	32.1 (89.8)	29.1 (84.4)	24.0 (75.2)	19.0 (66.2)	15.1 (59.2)	14.2 (57.6)	16.3 (61.3)	19.8 (67.6)	24.2 (75.6)	28.2 (82.8)	31.2 (88.2)	23.8 (74.8)
Mean daily minimum °C (°F)	17.4 (63.3)	17.1 (62.8)	14.2 (57.6)	9.8 (49.6)	6.1 (43.0)	4.1 (39.4)	2.7 (36.9)	3.9 (39.0)	6.2 (43.2)	9.5 (49.1)	12.8 (55.0)	15.6 (60.1)	10.0 (50.0)
Record low °C (°F)	5.0 (41.0)	6.1 (43.0)	2.8 (37.0)	−2.0 (28.4)	−3.3 (26.1)	−5.6 (21.9)	−5.6 (21.9)	−4.5 (23.9)	−4.4 (24.1)	−1.1 (30.0)	1.1 (34.0)	2.8 (37.0)	−5.6 (21.9)
Average precipitation mm (inches)	49.9 (1.96)	43.8 (1.72)	42.7 (1.68)	40.3 (1.59)	44.5 (1.75)	43.4 (1.71)	42.4 (1.67)	42.6 (1.68)	42.3 (1.67)	48.9 (1.93)	40.3 (1.59)	45.2 (1.78)	526.3 (20.73)
Average precipitation days (≥ 0.2 mm)	5.3	4.7	4.8	5.3	6.8	8.5	8.9	8.5	7.4	7.2	5.6	5.5	78.5
Average afternoon relative humidity (%)	35	38	41	46	55	64	63	57	48	43	36	35	47
Source: Bureau of Meteorology

== Floods ==
Since 1887 Forbes has experienced a major flood on average every seven years, with major flooding occurring in June 1952 with a peak of 10.8 metres (35 ft); September 2016 with a peak of 10.67 metres (35.0 ft); August 1990 with a peak of 10.65 metres (34.9 ft); October 1955 with a peak height of 10.62 metres (34.8 ft); March 2012 with a peak height of 10.55 metres (34.6 ft); and in August 1998 with a peak height of 10.35 metres (34.0 ft).

Forbes' most recent major flood was in late September 2016 after heavy rain fell on much of inland NSW; as the Bureau of Meteorology declared 2016 as the third-wettest winter on record. Unseasonal heavy rainfall in most of the state, centred on the catchment area of the upper Lachlan during autumn and winter 2016, resulted in Wyangala Dam water storage levels increasing from 38 per cent to 90 per cent. By early August, the Bureau of Meteorology had issued flood warnings for the Orara, Macquarie, Bogan and Lachlan rivers. In late August, Water NSW began releasing up to 10,000 megalitres (350×10^{6} cu ft) per day from Wyangala Dam ahead of expected daily rainfall in the range of 20 to 40 millimetres (0.79 to 1.57 in) in the dam's catchment area. Moderate to major flooding first hit Forbes and Condobolin in early September, and by mid-September predictions were for widespread flooding across most of inland New South Wales. By late September, flooding had peaked in Forbes at 10.67 metres (35.0 ft), with 1,000 people evacuated, as the Newell Highway was cut north and south of Forbes' central business district. Forbes was declared a natural disaster zone after flash flooding occurred, resulting in some residents being without homes. Back up support was provided by the State Emergency Service and the Australian Defence Force. As the Lachlan flowed into the Murrumbidgee River, major flooding occurred downriver during late October and early November at Hay, Darlington Point, Carrathool and Hillston.

== Newspapers ==
There are two local newspapers servicing Forbes.

- The Forbes Advocate is owned by Fairfax Media.
- The Forbes Phoenix is a free weekly paper that is published on Fridays. It is part of the independently owned Phoenix Group of papers.

Historical population
Year	Pop.	±%
1921	4,376	—
1933	5,355	+22.4%
1947	5,949	+11.1%
1954	6,514	+9.5%
1961	6,826	+4.8%
1966	7,370	+8.0%
1971	7,471	+1.4%
1976	7,754	+3.8%
1981	8,029	+3.5%
1986	7,915	−1.4%
1991	7,552	−4.6%
1996	7,467	−1.1%
2001	9,691	+29.8%
2006	9,361	−3.4%
2011	7,560	−19.2%
2016	8,432	+11.5%
2021	9,319	+10.5%
Source: Australian Bureau of Statistics data. (Census data on the ABS website ends in 2001)

== Notable residents ==
- Phil Adams, former Olympian and Commonwealth Games (record) medal holder in sport shooting
- Chris Anderson, who played for and coached the Australian rugby league team, attended Red Bend Catholic College in Forbes
- Grant Bartholomaeus, former Sydney Swans Australian rules footballer
- Nedd Brockmann, ultramarathon runner
- Janet Dawson, Australian artist, spent childhood years in Forbes
- Sir Hugh Robert Denison, tobacco manufacturer, newspaper proprietor and philanthropist, was born in Forbes in 1865
- Richard Dixon, former national president of the Communist Party of Australia, was born in Forbes in 1905
- Malcolm Johnston, Australian Racing Hall of Fame jockey
- Eve Langley, New Zealand-famed novelist, was born in Forbes in 1904
- Celia Pavey, known professionally as Vera Blue, is an Australian singer-songwriter who was born in Forbes January 1994
- Cec Pepper (1916–1993), first-class cricketer, was born in Forbes
- Charlie Staines, rugby league player for the Wests Tigers, born in Forbes.
- Carolyn Simpson, a judge of the Supreme Court of New South Wales; Member of the first all-female bench to sit in an Australian court
- Carmel Tebbutt, former Deputy Premier of New South Wales
- Damian Kennedy, former western suburbs magpies and Canberra Raiders player
- Adrian Toole, former north Sydney bears player
