= Electoral results for the district of Balranald =

Election results for Balranald, New South Wales, Australia

Balranald, an electoral district of the Legislative Assembly in the Australian state of New South Wales was created in 1859 and abolished in 1894.

Single-member (1859–1880)				
Election	Member	Party		
1859	Augustus Morris	None		
1860	Augustus Morris	None		
1864-65	Joseph Phelps	None		
1869-70	Joseph Phelps	None		
1872	Joseph Phelps	None		
1874-75	Joseph Phelps	None		
1877	Colin Simson	None		
Two members (1880–1894)
Election	Member	Party	Member	Party
1880	Robert Wilkinson	None	John Cramsie	None
1882	Robert Wilkinson	None	John Cramsie	None
1885	Robert Wilkinson	None	John Cramsie	None
1887	Robert Wilkinson	Ind. Free Trade	Allen Lakeman	Ind. Protectionist
1889	Robert Wilkinson	Free Trade	Allen Lakeman	Protectionist
1891	Robert Wilkinson	Free Trade	James Newton	Labour

== Election results ==
=== Elections in the 1890s ===
==== 1891 ====
1891 New South Wales colonial election: Balranald Monday 29 June
Party	Candidate	Votes	%	±%
Labour	James Newton (elected 1)	828	30.5	
Free Trade	Robert Wilkinson (elected 2)	705	26.0	
Protectionist	Allen Lakeman	650	23.9	
Protectionist	A L P Cameron	532	19.6	
Total formal votes		2,715	99.2	
Informal votes		22	0.8	
Turnout		1,639	43.2	
Labour gain 1 from Protectionist				
Free Trade hold 1				

=== Elections in the 1880s ===
==== 1889 ====
1889 New South Wales colonial election: Balranald Monday 28 January
Party	Candidate	Votes	%	±%
Protectionist	Allen Lakeman (elected)	unopposed		
Free Trade	Robert Wilkinson (elected)	unopposed		
Member changed to Protectionist from Ind. Protectionist				
Member changed to Free Trade from Ind. Free Trade				

==== 1887 ====
1887 New South Wales colonial election: Balranald Thursday 24 February
Party	Candidate	Votes	%	±%
Ind. Protectionist	Allen Lakeman (elected 1)	946	40.4	
Ind. Free Trade	Robert Wilkinson (re-elected 2)	777	33.2	
Independent	Alexander Cameron	621	26.5	
Total formal votes		2,344	98.2	
Informal votes		43	1.8	
Turnout		1,589	39.4	

==== 1885 ====
1885 New South Wales colonial election: Balranald Wednesday 28 October
Candidate	Votes	%
Robert Wilkinson (re-elected 1)	1,025	37.2
John Cramsie (re-elected 2)	941	34.1
Allen Lakeman	790	28.7
Total formal votes	2,756	100.0
Informal votes	0	0.0
Turnout	2,756	36.5

==== 1882 ====
1882 New South Wales colonial election: Balranald Wednesday 20 December
Candidate	Votes	%
Robert Wilkinson (re-elected)	unopposed	
John Cramsie (re-elected)	unopposed	

==== 1880 ====
1880 New South Wales colonial election: Balranald Thursday 2 December
Candidate	Votes	%
John Cramsie (elected 1)	1,039	35.8
Robert Wilkinson (elected 2)	1,002	34.5
James Warby	482	16.6
Total formal votes	378	100.0
Informal votes	2,901	0.0
Turnout	2,921	49.9
	(1 new seat)	

The sitting member Colin Simson did not contest the election.

=== Elections in the 1870s ===
==== 1877 ====
1877 New South Wales colonial election: Balranald Monday 12 November
Candidate	Votes	%
Colin Simson (elected)	623	79.8
John Smart	158	20.2
Total formal votes	781	100.0
Informal votes	0	0.0
Turnout	797	23.2

==== 1874-75 ====
1874–75 New South Wales colonial election: Balranald Monday 11 January 1875
Candidate	Votes	%
Joseph Phelps (re-elected)	unopposed	

==== 1872 ====
1872 New South Wales colonial election: Balranald Thursday 28 March
Candidate	Votes	%
Joseph Phelps (re-elected)	unopposed	

=== Elections in the 1860s ===
==== 1869-70 ====
1869–70 New South Wales colonial election: Balranald Wednesday 5 January 1870
Candidate	Votes	%
Joseph Phelps (re-elected)	unopposed	

==== 1864-65 ====
1864–65 New South Wales colonial election: Balranald Wednesday 18 January 1865
Candidate	Votes	%
Joseph Phelps (elected)	unopposed	

==== 1860 ====
1860 New South Wales colonial election: Balranald Wednesday 19 December
Candidate	Votes	%
Augustus Morris (re-elected)	unopposed	

=== Elections in the 1850s ===
==== 1859 ====
1859 New South Wales colonial election: Balranald Tuesday 5 July
Candidate	Votes	%
Augustus Morris (elected)	119	81.5
William Brodribb	27	18.5
Total formal votes	146	100.0
Informal votes	0	0.0
Turnout	146	37.4
