= Hay and Hell and Booligal =

1896 poem by Banjo Paterson

- by Banjo Paterson
- Written: 1896
- First published in: The Bulletin
- Country: Australia
- Language: English
- Publication date: 25 April 1896

Full text
- Hay and Hell and Booligal at Wikisource

Hay and Hell and Booligal is an 1896 poem by the Australian bush poet A. B. 'Banjo' Paterson who wrote the poem while working as a solicitor with the firm of Street & Paterson in Sydney. It was first published in The Bulletin on 25 April 1896. The poem was later included in Paterson's collection Rio Grande's Last Race and Other Verses, first published in 1902.

The phrase "Hay and Hell and Booligal" and its more common variant "Hay, Hell and Booligal" is used figuratively in the Australian vernacular "to designate a place of the greatest imaginable discomfort". The phrase was popularised by Paterson's poem, but the expression pre-dates his work.

Hay is a town in south-western New South Wales on the Murrumbidgee River. Booligal is a town on the Lachlan River, 76 kilometres (47 miles) north of Hay by road. The road connecting the two townships (today a section of the Cobb Highway) crosses a flat expanse of country known as the One Tree Plain. In the earlier expression "Hay, Hell and Booligal", and also Paterson's adaptation of the phrase, "Hell" corresponds to the One Tree Plain, on the stock route between Hay and Booligal.

== Early newspaper references ==
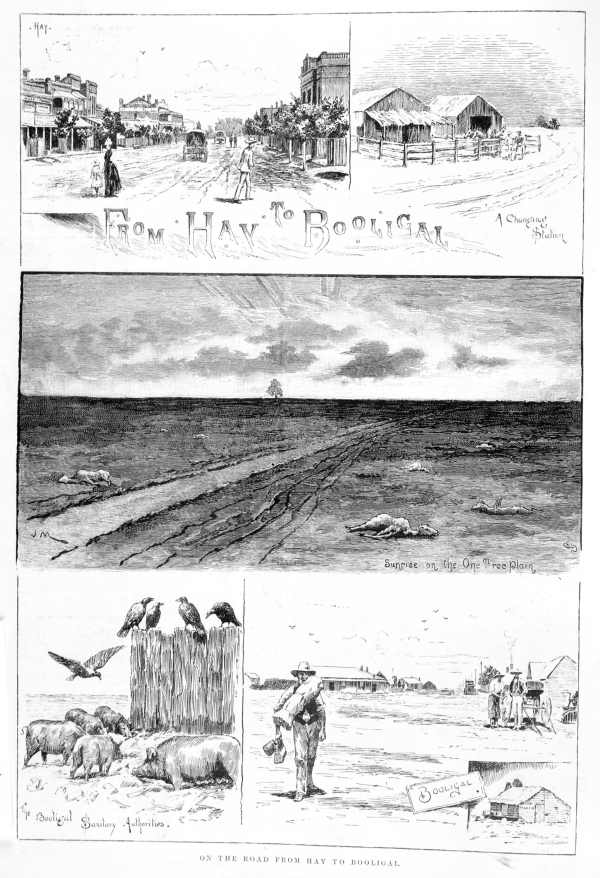
Woodblock engravings published in the Illustrated Australian News in January 1889 showing the effects of drought in the region between Hay and Booligal and scenes from each township.

In 1888 much of New South Wales was experiencing a devastating drought, after a succession of dry years across south-eastern Australia. In early December 1888 a first-hand account of the effect of the drought on the western Riverina districts entitled 'The Riverina Drought: The Murrumbidgee to the Lachlan' was published in The Age newspaper in Melbourne. In the long article the "special reporter" describes the road between Hay and Booligal as being "sprinkled with carcases [of sheep] more or less close together all the way" and includes the following: "The drovers and teamsters who do this route reckon that it covers the hottest place known to fact and imagination, for they say the line of track is Hay, Hell and Booligal…". The article was re-published in at least four Victorian and South Australian newspapers during the following week.

The phrase “Hay, Hell and Booligal” in the above passage describes the “line of track” from Hay to Booligal via the One Tree Plain. By conflating the One Tree Plain with Hell, and singling it out as “the hottest place known to fact and imagination”, the writer (in reporting a saying of “drovers and teamsters”) is apparently contrasting the rigours of crossing the One Tree Plain (especially during the summer months) with the comparative river-side comforts and amenities to be found at the two named townships (Hay and Booligal).

Soon after the December 1888 article was published an artist from the Melbourne newspaper, Illustrated Australian News, made “a special journey to the Riverina district” and recorded his journey in an article and illustrations published in that newspaper in mid-January 1889. The use of the phrase “Hay, Hell and Booligal” in this article presents a distinct shift in meaning from that of the December 1888 article in The Age. In describing Booligal the passage reads: “Added to this, both flies and mosquitos are more plentiful than anything else, so that, when the climate is taken into consideration, Booligal seems to fully earn its place in the comparison instituted by residents and visitors, who place it thus — Hay, Hell and Booligal”. The writer uses the phrase “Hay, Hell and Booligal” to describe an ascending scale of discomfort and misery culminating with Booligal (in comparison to the earlier article which used the phrase to describe the stages of the journey and conflating the One Tree Plain with Hell). The artist/writer, as his article attests, crossed the One Tree Plain at night by coach “to avoid the heat of the day” (to be compared with a much slower journey by a drover or teamster, much or all of it of necessity during the day).

In a report published in the Riverine Grazier (Hay) in early February 1889 a correspondent from Booligal expressed disappointment and annoyance at the coverage of his township in the article and illustrations in the Australian Illustrated News. "The bye-word 'Hay, Hell, and Booligal,' suggests Milton's 'lower depth' and miseries unspeakable" the correspondent wrote; "surely the disadvantages of our position are sufficiently numerous and irksome, without the exasperating addition of seeing them published far and wide with scarcely a word on the other side in favor of our much abused village".

== Paterson's poem ==
There seems little doubt that A. B. Paterson was influenced by the article and illustrations regarding the drought-ravaged Hay and Booligal districts published in January 1889 in the widely-read Australian Illustrated News.

Hay and Hell and Booligal by 'The Banjo' was first published in The Bulletin on 25 April 1896. Paterson's poem compares Booligal unfavourably with the nearby town of Hay, and even Hell itself, recounting a litany of problems with the township — heat, sand, dust, flies, rabbits, mosquitos, snakes and drought — with humorous intent.

The poem concludes with the lines:

"We'd have to stop!" With bated breath
We prayed that both in life and death
Our fate in other lines might fall:
"Oh, send us to our just reward
In Hay or Hell, but, gracious Lord,
Deliver us from Booligal!"

— A. B. "Banjo" Paterson, Hay and Hell and Booligal

It is doubtful that A. B. Paterson ever visited Booligal or Hay. In 1943 the Hay newspaper, the Riverine Grazier, included the following: "we think we are right in saying that Banjo only paid Booligal one visit, and that was years after he wrote his familiar lines". However a search of the local newspaper files finds no reference to a visit by Paterson during his lifetime (an event that, had it occurred after 1902, would most certainly have received a mention).

== Local reactions to the poem ==
The local newspaper at Hay, the Riverine Grazier, re-published the verse Hay and Hell and Booligal by "The Banjo in The Bulletin" on 1 May 1896, within a week of it first being published in The Bulletin. In the same newspaper in early June 1896 a correspondent writing from Mossgiel reported that residents of Booligal considered they had been “subjected to indignity” and that “Booligal regards ‘The Banjo’ as a very indifferent poet”. A "leading resident" was reported as saying "poet's license be hanged, he's got no license to tell lies". The report concluded: "I am afraid you have done your circulation a serious injury by reprinting that poem, which was an excellent one in many respects, but calculated to get Booligal's hair off".

Perceptions of Hay township were also influenced by Paterson’s poem. A writer for the Sydney Stock and Station Journal visited Hay in July 1896 and prefaced the report with these comments:

"Banjo" has written a poem in the "Bulletin"' entitled "Hay, Hell and Booligal," and you'd wonder what an influence a thing like that has on men's minds. I like "Banjo's" writings, and when you like a man his sayings influence you a good deal. I went out to Hay, for the first time, with a bit of a misgiving in regard to it, but I've been converted. Hallelujah! Hay is a good place, a pretty place, a jolly place… There are no flies on the Haytians!

In November 1912 an article appeared in Hay's Riverine Grazier extolling the resilience of the districts around Hay after a period of below average rainfall. The article began with these comments:

There is no district which has suffered more from being falsely decried than the Hay district. Banjo Patterson wrote "Hay, Hell, and Booligal !" and so potent is a catchy phrase, and so hard to shake off an unwarrantable nickname, that many people who have never been in the district think that the Australian poet must have had some warrant for coupling Hay and Booligal with the infernal regions. Those who know the district and its splendid capacities, know better…

In May 1936 the newly-built Booligal War Memorial Hall was opened with a fund-raising ball attended by local and district residents. 'Banjo' Paterson ("the man who put Booligal on the map") had been especially invited to attend the function. In an interview with Roger Sheaffe, the president of the hall committee, Paterson explained that he could not attend "as he was getting too far on in years to make the journey". The poet had remarked, "I suppose Booligal has grown into a fine big town now", to which Sheaffe wryly replied, "No, it never recovered from the blow you dealt to it in its youth". Paterson "autographed a number of copies of his works" for the occasion, which were sold at the hall opening to benefit the building fund.

When A. B. Paterson died in 1941 the following remarks were included in his obituary in the Riverine Grazier newspaper:

Paterson's "Hay, Hell and Booligal" did not add to the poet's popularity in the districts mentioned, but the line which is still quoted by people ignorant of the actual conditions, was probably only used by the poet as a catchy phrase.

== The phrase in Australian vernacular ==
The phrase "Hay and Hell and Booligal", or its more common variant "Hay, Hell and Booligal", has become part of Australian folklore and has found a place in the Australian vernacular, largely due to the popularity of 'Banjo' Paterson's poetry. In February 1897 a correspondent to The Bulletin, in canvassing possible sites for a Federal capital, discussed the “mean summer temperature” of Bourke and included the aside: “(How much cooler than Hay, Hell, and Booligal is not stated)”. In May 1897, a year after the publication of the poem and with the Riverina once again experiencing drought conditions, a report in The Age in Melbourne included the following sentence:

On previous occasions the country between the Murrumbidgee and the Lachlan has been referred to... as Hay, Hell and Booligal, and though the comparison as indicated by the position of the words may not be exact, there is, this year at all events, a modicum of truth in the laconic expression.

The phrase is generally used as a signifier for a place of extreme heat and discomfort. The following is an example from 2013:

We have all heard the old saying – there are few places hotter than Hay, Hell or Booligal. Well there was no place to evade the heat at Alma Merino stud, north-west of Booligal, last Wednesday.

The author and folklorist Bill Wannan titled his collection of Australian bush humour Hay, Hell and Booligal (first published in 1961).

== Recordings ==
A recording of Paterson's poem recited by Hay school-teacher, Sam Willis, was released in 1972. Willis' recitation was the B-side of 'Hay Centenary, 1972' by Jimmie Webster and The Starlites, a single released by EMI (Australia) Ltd. (PRS-2304). The record was released in celebration of the centenary of local government at Hay.

== See also ==
- 1896 in Australian literature
