= James Newton (New South Wales politician) =

Australian politician (1850–1913)

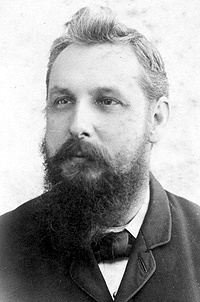

Member for Balranald (NSW Legislative Assembly)
- In office 29 June 1891 – 25 June 1894

Personal details
- Born: 1 January 1850 Ashton, county Lancashire, England
- Died: 14 September 1913 (aged 63) Hay, New South Wales
- Spouse(s): (1) Sarah Jane Carnochan (2) Catherine Agnes Barrow
- Parents: Jonathon Newton (father); Martha (née Batty) (mother)

James Newton (1850 – 14 September 1913) was an English-born Australian politician who was one of two parliamentary members for the New South Wales electorate of Balranald from July 1891 to July 1894. Newton operated a saddlery business at Hay and was prominent in local affairs, serving as an alderman and mayor.

== Biography ==
=== Early years ===
James Newton was born on 1 January 1850 at Ashton in county Lancashire, the son of Jonathon Newton and Martha (née Batty). His father was a bricklayer.

In 1857 the Newton family emigrated to Australia and settled in Geelong, and later at Castlemaine, where his father worked as a contractor. Young James was apprenticed to a saddle- and harness-making establishment in Castlemaine and learned the trade of a harness-maker.

After completing his apprenticeship Newton worked as a harness-maker and saddler in various Victorian towns. By 1870 he was working in New South Wales and by about the early to mid-1870s he had settled at Hay in the Riverina district on the Murrumbidgee River.

=== Hay ===
On 10 June 1875 Newton married Sarah Carnochan at Castlemaine, Victoria. The couple had five children born at Hay from July 1876 to February 1884.^{[A]}

In July 1875 the partnership of Newton and Tate established a new saddlery in Lachlan Street at Hay. At first the business was carried out by waggon, travelling to district pastoral stations and settlements. Afterwards a saddlery shop was established in Lachlan Street at Hay. Both Newton and Tate were described as "industrious, competent tradesmen". In December 1878 Newton and Tate purchased the saddlery business of J. Johnson at Booligal, and operated it as a branch of their establishment at Hay. In later years, after the partnership was dissolved, Tate took over the hawking waggons and Newton retained the business of the saddlery shop at Hay.

Sarah Newton died of bronchitis on 28 May 1884 at Hay, aged 32. James Newton and Catherine Barrow were married on 27 October 1885 in Melbourne. The couple had eight children born from 1887 to 1900.

Newton took an active interest in municipal affairs. In about 1883 he was elected as an alderman of the Hay Municipal Council, described as "an energetic and prominent member" of that body. After Hay township was brought under the operation of the Fire Brigades' Act, in 1885 Newton was appointed chairman of the local board.

James Newton was elected mayor in January 1887. In February 1888, at a special meeting of the Hay Municipal Council, Newton declined to be re-elected mayor for the ensuing year, saying that "he would not stand unless no other gentleman came forward". Alderman John Jacka was elected mayor in his place.

Newton chaired a meeting in September 1887 at which the Hay Carriers' Union was formed, an organisation of district drivers of waggons drawn by bullock or horse teams. He was appointed treasurer at the meeting. In 1888 the labour organisation changed its name to the Riverine Carriers' Union. In March 1889 Newton was appointed secretary of the Riverine Carriers' Union. During his association with the union Newton introduced a system of 'rotation loading', or "loading in turn", to give all carriers "an equal chance of work".

Newton joined the Independent Order of Oddfellows in the early 1880's and became a Grand Master of that body in 1889.

=== Member for Balranald ===
Newton decided to contest the New South Wales elections of 1891 for the Balranald electorate, which at that time returned two members. Four candidates were nominated: A. L. P. Cameron, Allen Lakeman (a sitting member) and Newton (each of them supporters of protectionism), as well as the other sitting member Robert Wilkinson, a Free Trader. Newton and Lakeman were both residents of Hay and there were early attempts to persuade both men to run together to take advantage of the strong support for protectionism in the electorate. However Lakeman decided to run on his own, fearing that Newton's "connection with the Carriers' Union would lead to the estrangement of landholders' votes in the Booligal, Mossgiel, New South Wales, and Hillston districts". At the election held in June and early July 1891 Newton was elected as one of the two members to represent the electoral district of Balranald, together with the free-trade candidate Robert B. Wilkinson who was re-elected. Newton topped the poll with 828 votes (or 30.5 percent).

Newton's successful 1891 campaign was strongly supported by the working classes in the electorate, bolstered by his association with the Carriers' Union. The newly-formed Labor Party had run candidates in the 1891 election but Newton always maintained that he had not been a recognised candidate of the Labor Electoral League of New South Wales (as it was then known). Labor Party candidates were required to sign a pledge to support all caucus decisions in parliament, which Newton had not done. He claimed that it was only after the election that the Labor authorities tried to associate their organisation with his successful campaign.

=== Later years ===
In 1893 the Parliamentary Electorates and Elections Act was passed which reduced future representation in the New South Wales Legislative Assembly to 125 single-member electorates. The two-member electorate of Balranald was divided into the single-member electorates of Hay, The Lachlan and Wentworth. Wilkinson decided to retire from politics and Newton became a candidate for the Hay electorate along with four others. Three of the candidates represented serious opposition to Newton, Lakeman a fellow protectionist and two free trade advocates, George Mair and James Ashton. Ashton was a newspaperman living at Narrandera, who had previously been part-owner of The Riverine Grazier at Hay. The election held in July 1894 was "very keenly contested" and was won by Ashton with 37.8 percent of the vote. Newton fell short by 92 votes, attracting 30.5 percent of the vote.

After the election Newton resumed his saddlery and harness-making business (which had been operated by his employees during his parliamentary term).

At the New South Wales election held in July 1895 Newton ran as the protectionist candidate against the sitting member of the Hay electorate, James Ashton. In a two-way contest, Ashton was re-elected with 61.3 percent of the vote.

Ashton did not stand for the Hay electorate at the election held in July 1898, having decided to contest the seat of Goulburn instead. The candidates for Hay were Newton and Allen Lakeman, standing as protectionists and federalists, and Francis Byrne standing as a free-trade candidate. Newton was selected as the candidate for the National Federal Party (the renamed Protectionist Party). At the election the free-trade candidate, Frank Byrne, was successful with 53 percent of the vote. The remaining votes were split between Newton and Lakeman, with Newton receiving 25.4 percent.

James Newton died on 14 September 1913 at his residence in Alma Street, Hay, aged 63 years. The cause of his death was cerebral sclerosis.

== Notes ==
A.Sarah Jane Carnochan was born in about 1852 at Birkenhead, county Cheshire, the daughter of a farmer, John Carnochan, and Sarah (née Earle). She emigrated to Australia in 1875.

New South Wales Legislative Assembly
Preceded by Allen Lakeman	Member for Balranald; 1891–1894; Served alongside: Robert Wilkinson	Abolished
