= Mossgiel =

Mossgiel can refer to:

- Mossgiel Farm, Ayrshire, Scotland - home of poet Robert Burns
- Mossgiel, New South Wales, named after Burns's farm

== See also ==
- Mosgiel, New Zealand - also named for Burns's farm
