= One Tree, New South Wales =

One Tree
- Town
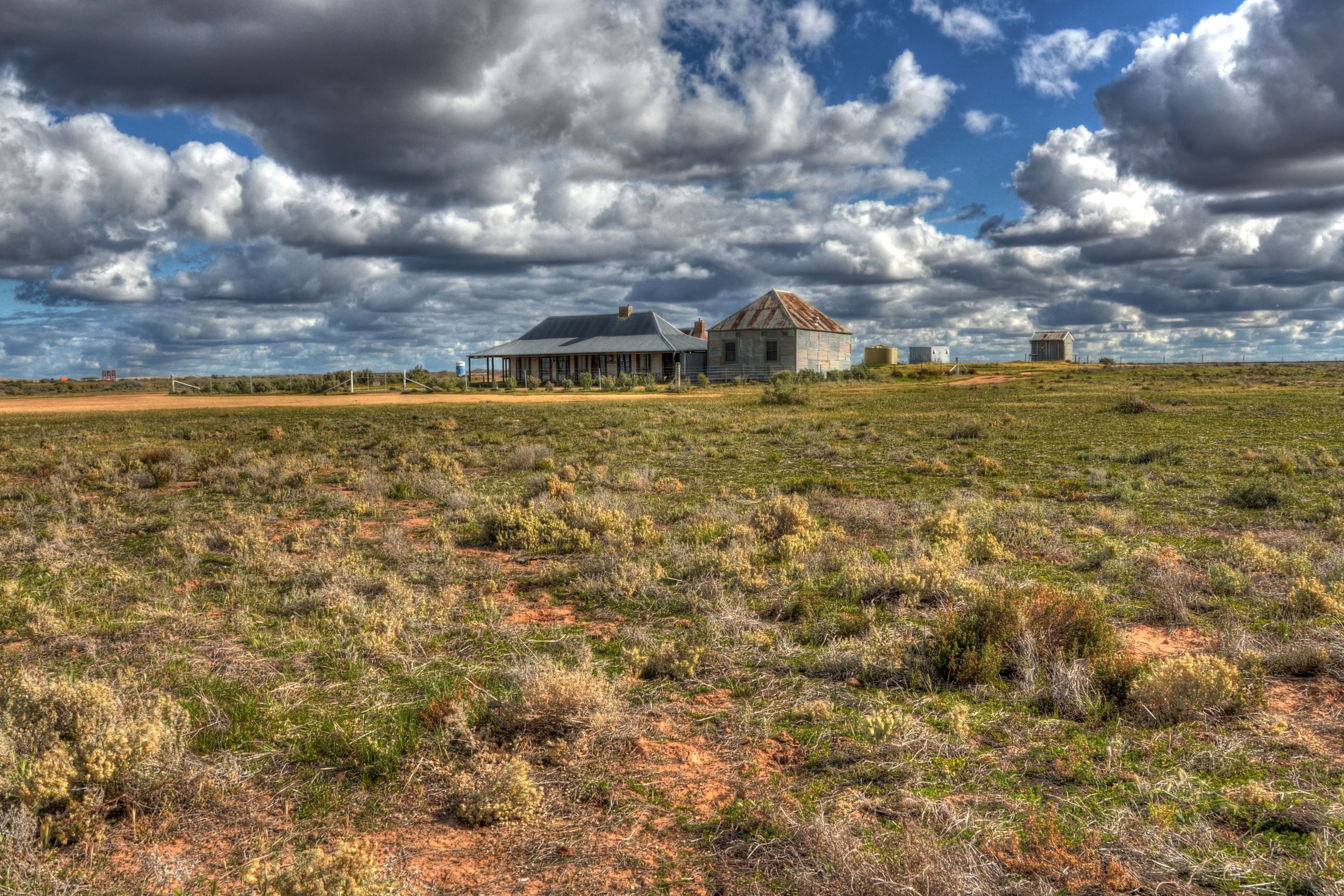
- One Tree Hotel shown against Old Man Plain, 2017

- Coordinates: 34°10′S 144°42′E
- Country: Australia
- State: New South Wales
- LGA: Hay Shire
- Location: 38 km (24 mi) from Hay; 39 km (24 mi) from Booligal
- Established: 1862

Government
  - State electorate: Murray
  - Federal division: Farrer

Population
  - Total: 22 (SAL 2021)
- Postcode: 2711
- County: Waradgery

One Tree is a location on the Cobb Highway on the flat plain between Hay and Booligal in the Riverina district of New South Wales, Australia. In 1862 a public house was built there, originally called Finch's Inn and the locality developed as a coach changing-stage and watering-place between the Murrumbidgee and Lachlan rivers. One Tree village was surveyed and proclaimed in 1882, though the location remained as just an amenity on the plain, centred on the hotel.

The existing One Tree Hotel is the second building of that name to occupy the site. The first hotel was destroyed by fire in 1903. The hotel was re-built in the same manner as the original structure (by the provisions of the insurance policy). The licence of the One Tree Hotel was relinquished in 1942 by its last publican, Frank McQuade. The One Tree Hotel is an important historical building, providing a tangible link to the heyday of pastoral settlement in the Riverina.

The name "One Tree" derives from the presence of a large gum tree on the otherwise treeless plain (called the One Tree Plain). The landmark tree was blown down in a storm on New Year's Eve, 31 January 1897.

== History ==
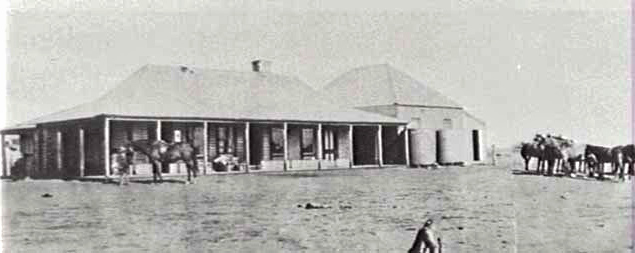
One Tree Hotel in about 1922

In September 1862 it was reported that Alexander Finch ("late of Deniliquin") was building "a new public house at the One Tree". The hotel was built by William Davies of adzed cypress-pine slabs. In June 1864 a reserve of four square miles was proclaimed around the "Single Tree" (excised from 'Ulonga' station). A publican's license was granted to Finch in August 1864 for his public house at One Tree (then known as Finch's Inn or Finch's Public House). In December 1865 Alexander Finch was successful in sinking a well at One Tree. A second well, sunk in the first half of 1866 close to the nearby solitary tree, "struck a beautiful freshwater spring which promises to prove inexhaustible".

In June 1866 Finch's "One-Tree Inn" was advertised for sale by public auction at Hay ("in consequence of his wife's illness"). The hotel was described as a "bar, two parlours, six bedrooms, and offices; kitchen, six-stalled stable, and outbuildings", standing on "five acres of purchased land". The One Tree Inn was sold to Simon Moss, a storekeeper from Hay. After the sale to Moss the Publicans' License was transferred to James R. Johnstone, who had previously worked as a superintendent on district pastoral runs. In July 1867 the One Tree Inn was sold to Mr. R. Mahaffey, a pastoralist on 'Walgiers' station on the Lachlan River, with Johnstone continuing to run the establishment as publican.

In December 1869 land was reserved from the "Ulonga" and "Overall Plains" pastoral runs "for the Village of One Tree".

== Structure of the hotel ==
The One Tree Hotel is constructed of split cypress-pine logs, with verandahs on three sides and a hipped corrugated-iron roof. Twelve-paned windows are located between the four panel doors which open along the verandahs. There is a detached kitchen and small weatherboard shed at the rear of the building. The building was an accurate 1903 replication of the original 1862 hotel which had been destroyed by fire. The insurance company, the Australian Mutual Fire Insurance Society, stipulated the hotel was to be replaced with one identical to the original.

The One Tree Hotel was placed on the Register of the National Estate in May 1991.

== Literary associations ==
An alternate name for One Tree was "Hell", and the locality was referenced in Banjo Paterson's poem Hay and Hell and Booligal.
