= Allen Lakeman =

Australian politician (c.1847–1910)

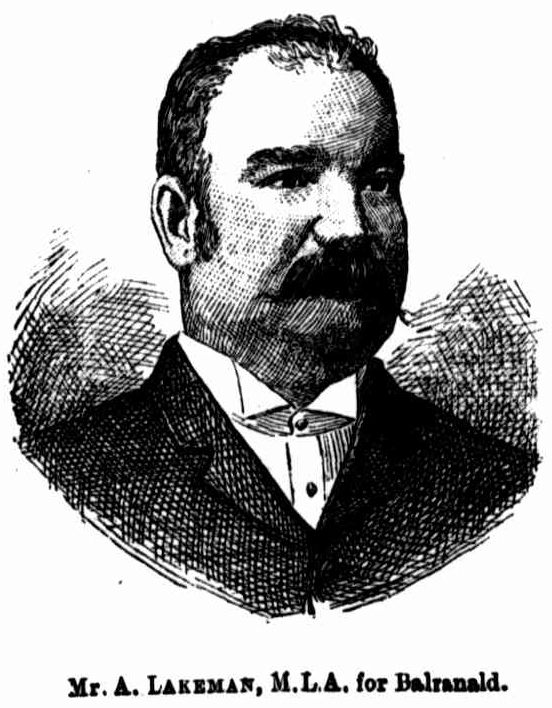

Member for Balranald (NSW Legislative Assembly)
- In office 24 February 1887 – 6 June 1891

Personal details
- Born: 1847–9 New Plymouth, Taranaki, New Zealand
- Died: 7 May 1910 (aged 61) Narrandera, New South Wales
- Spouse: Ellen Cochran
- Parents: William Lakeman (father); Martha (née Allen) (mother)

Allen Lakeman (1847–9 – 7 May 1910) was a New Zealand-born Australian politician who was one of two parliamentary members for the New South Wales electorate of Balranald from February 1887 to June 1891. Lakeman operated various businesses at Hay and was prominent in local affairs, serving as an alderman and mayor from 1880 to 1882.

== Biography ==
=== Early years ===
Allen Lakeman was born in about 1847–9 at New Plymouth, in the Taranaki region of New Zealand's North Island, the son of William Lakeman and Martha (née Allen). His father was a storekeeper.

The Lakeman family left New Zealand for the colony of New South Wales when Allen was an infant. The family lived at Albury and later at Wagga Wagga.

=== Hay ===
In February 1869 it was reported that James Pollard's store-keeping business at Hay, on the Murrumbidgee River, had been sold to James Warby, a store-owner at Wagga Wagga and Lakeman's brother-in-law.^{[A]}

In May 1870 Pollard sold his steamer, the J.H.P., to Warby. Lakeman began working as the supercargo aboard the J.H.P., delivering goods to settlements along the Murrumbidgee River. At about this time Lakeman began living at Hay. By 1872 Lakeman was working as the manager of Warby's store at Hay.

Allen Lakeman and Mary Ellen Cochran were married at Hay on 3 March 1873. The couple had twelve children.

In August 1872 Lakeman was elected as an auditor for the Hay Municipal Council. Lakeman became an alderman in 1875.

In March 1874 Warby retired from business and his store was taken over by the partnership of Pollard and Saunders. Lakeman joined with Thomas Blewett as a partner in the storekeeping business of Blewett and Co., becoming manager of the extensive store in Lachlan Street at Hay. In about 1879 Blewett left Hay for Melbourne, after which Lakeman took over the business on his own account.

From about 1879 Lakeman was a partner in a coaching business, Lakeman, Halbisch and Co., operating mail and passenger coaches between Wagga Wagga and Hay via Narrandera.

In February 1880, at a special meeting of Hay Municipal Council, Lakeman was elected mayor "for the ensuing municipal year". He was re-elected as mayor for 1881.

John Witcombe and Lakeman were both contenders for the Hay Municipal Council mayoral election held in February 1882. Lakeman was elected, but Witcombe "took an action to the Supreme Court to oust Lakeman from the office, on the ground of some technical informality". The Court declared the election "null and void". After the decision was handed down, the Hay Council, "with all due formality, elected Lakeman to the position from which he had been ousted".

In 1882 Lakeman established the Black Horse Brewery at South Hay.

In the late 1880s Lakeman was in partnership with James Bowes in a business as commission and land agents. The partnership continued until Bowes' death in March 1889.

=== Member for Balranald ===
Lakeman decided to contest the New South Wales elections of 1887 for the Balranald electorate, which at that time returned two members. Three candidates were nominated including one of the sitting members, Robert Wilkinson, who was a free trade supporter. Lakeman campaigned as a supporter of protectionism. At the election held in February 1887 Lakeman was elected as one of the two members to represent the Balranald electorate in the New South Wales Legislative Assembly, together with Wilkinson who was re-elected. Lakeman topped the poll with 946 votes (or 40.4 percent). Both Lakeman and Wilkinson were re-elected unopposed at the New South Wales election of February 1889.

By the late 1890s Lakeman and his family were living at Manly, but Lakeman continued to visit and maintain business interests in the western Riverina.

Four candidates were nominated for the Balranald electorate at the election of 1891: Lakeman and another Hay resident James Newton (both of them supporters of protectionism), as well as the other sitting member Robert Wilkinson. The fourth candidate, A.L.P. Cameron, was also a protectionist. There were early attempts to persuade both Lakeman and Newton to run together to take advantage of the strong support for protectionism in the electorate. However Lakeman decided to run on his own, fearing that Newton's "connection with the Carriers' Union would lead to the estrangement of landholders' votes in the Booligal, Mossgiel, New South Wales, and Hillston districts". At the election held in June and early July 1891 Lakeman lost his seat. Newton was elected as one of the two members to represent the electoral district of Balranald, together with the free-trade candidate Wilkinson, who was re-elected. With the protectionist vote being split three ways, Lakeman received 650 votes (or 23.9 percent), whereas Newton topped the poll with 828 votes (or 30.5 percent).

=== Later years ===
After his defeat at the 1891 election Lakeman continued in the profession of a commission and land agent for the rest of his life.

Allen Lakeman died of a brain haemorrhage on 7 May 1910 at Narrandera.

== Notes ==
A. Allen Lakeman's sister Sarah, born at New Plymouth in September 1848, married James Warby on 26 December 1865 at Wagga Wagga.

New South Wales Legislative Assembly
| Preceded by John Cramsie | Member for Balranald; 1887–1891; Served alongside: Robert Wilkinson | Succeeded by James Newton |
