= The Wool Track =

Road in New South Wales, Australia

Route information
- Length: 460 km (290 mi)

Location
- Country: Australia
- State: New South Wales

Highway system
- Highways in Australia; National Highway; Freeways in Australia; Highways in New South Wales

The Wool Track is a name given to the road route between Balranald and Cobar, via Ivanoe, in New South Wales, Australia. It connects the Sturt Highway at Balranald to the Barrier Highway around 10 km west of Cobar. At Ivanhoe, it has an offset T-intersection with the Cobb Highway. It is 460 km long, 82 km shorter in length than the route via Hay and Hillston (Sturt Highway and Kidman Way).

Between Balranald and Ivanhoe, it is also known, at different localities, by several other names, including Ivanhoe Road and Balranald Road. Beyond Ivanhoe, it is also known as Cobar-Ivanhoe Road. The road is partially-sealed, and another 40 km was sealed in 2023. Funding is being sought, with the objective of sealing the remainder of it, to make it suitable as an alternative route for heavy transport vehicles.

The name of the road is associated with two non-fiction books about the Far West region of New South Wales, On the Wool Track, by historian, C.E.W. Bean—illustrated with photographs by George Bell (1862—1925)— and Back on the Wool Track, by journalist and academic, Michelle Grattan.
