= Colin Simson =

Scottish-born Australian politician

Colin William Simson (1828 – 23 February 1905) was a Scottish-born Australian politician who was a member for the New South Wales electorate of electorate of Balranald from November 1877 to November 1880. Simson was a pastoralist who owned stations in Victoria and later in New South Wales. He purchased 'Mungadal' station near Hay in 1865 and 'Trinkey' station near Gunnedah in 1889 (in partnership with his son).

== Biography ==
=== Early years ===
Colin Simson was born in about December 1828 at Pittenween in Fifeshire, Scotland, the son of Robert Simson and Elizabeth (née Carstairs). His father was a farmer.^{[A]}

Simson's older brother Robert (born in 1819) had emigrated to Australia in 1842 and, in partnership with his cousin Philip Russell, purchased 'Carngham' station in the Western District of Victoria in April 1843. After a visit to England, he returned in 1850 accompanied by his brother John (born in 1822) and another cousin, Thomas Russell.

=== Australia ===
Colin Simson migrated to Victoria in 1851 in the influx of migrants during the gold-rushes in that colony.

The partnership between Robert Simson and Philip Russell was dissolved in April 1853 and in the following July Robert purchased 'Langi Kal Kal' station, at Raglan (near Beaufort), in partnership with his younger brother Colin Simson. In June 1855 at Ballarat the three brothers, Robert, John and Colin Simson, were involved in the formation of the Squatters' Association.

In January 1858 the partnership between Robert and Colin Simson, "land and stock holders", was "dissolved by mutual consent". Colin Simson purchased a pastoral property at York Plains in the Wimmera region. By March 1861 Simson held land at Lexton, in central western Victoria.

Colin Simson and Marguerite Madeliene Smith were married on 3 December 1862 at St. Peter's Church in Melbourne. The couple had nine children.

=== Hay ===
In 1865 Simson purchased 'Mungadal' station, in New South Wales near the township of Hay on the Murrumbidgee River, from the brothers Dr. Thomas Lang and Gideon Lang. His purchase also included the 'Midgecleugh' run, an adjoining back-station. Simson made improvements to his new acquisitions by erecting eighty-four miles of sheep-proof wire fencing, to divide the pastoral property into six large paddocks, enabling the running of sheep without requiring the employment of shepherds.

Simson was appointed as a magistrate in New South Wales in about August 1866.

By the early 1870s Simson had purchased a residence in Williams Road in Toorak (a suburb of Melbourne).

=== Member for Balranald ===
At a meeting held at Hay in late September 1877 Simson was proposed as a candidate for the Balranald electorate, a large electorate which extended west to the South Australian border and north to Bourke on the Darling River. The sitting member, Joseph J. Phelps, was in Europe when the New South Wales parliament was dissolved in October 1877 and did not nominate to re-contest the seat. The only other person to nominate for the Balranald electorate was Captain John Smart, described as "a stranger in the district". In his addresses to the electors Simson described himself as a freetrader. At the election held in late October and early November 1877 Simson was elected as the member for Balranald in the New South Wales Legislative Assembly. He topped the poll with 623 votes (or 79.8 percent).

During his parliamentary career Simson was instrumental in getting the plans for the extension of the South-Western Railway, from Junee to Narrandera and Hay, approved and passed by Parliament.

In the lead-up to the November 1880 election Simson announced that he did not intend "to offer himself for re-election". A local newspaper commented: "A more pains-taking member, and one who looked after all the interests of the district he represented, could not be found".

=== Later years ===
For many years Simson resided in Melbourne, paying occasional visits to 'Mungadal'. In 1886 he purchased 'Carmyle' in Malvern Road, Toorak, where he resided for the rest of his life. 'Carmyle' was a brick mansion of twenty rooms on six and a half acres of land.

In late 1889 Simson purchased the 'Trinkey' pastoral station, near Gunnedah in the Liverpool Plains district. The station was run as a partnership between Simson and his eldest son William, with William living on the property.

The partnership for the running of 'Trinkey' station between Simson and his son William was dissolved in December 1903 "by mutual consent".

Simson died of pneumonia on 23 February 1905, aged 76, during a visit to his son-in-law Thomas Fairbairn, at his 'Burnside' property in Leigh Road, near Geelong.

== Notes ==
A. Colin William Simson was baptised on 18 December 1828 at Pittenweem, Fifeshire, Scotland.

New South Wales Legislative Assembly
Preceded by Joseph Phelps	Member for Balranald; 1877–1880	Succeeded by John Cramsie; Robert Wilkinson
