= Robert Wilkinson (Australian politician) =

Australian politician (1837–1928)

Robert Bliss Wilkinson
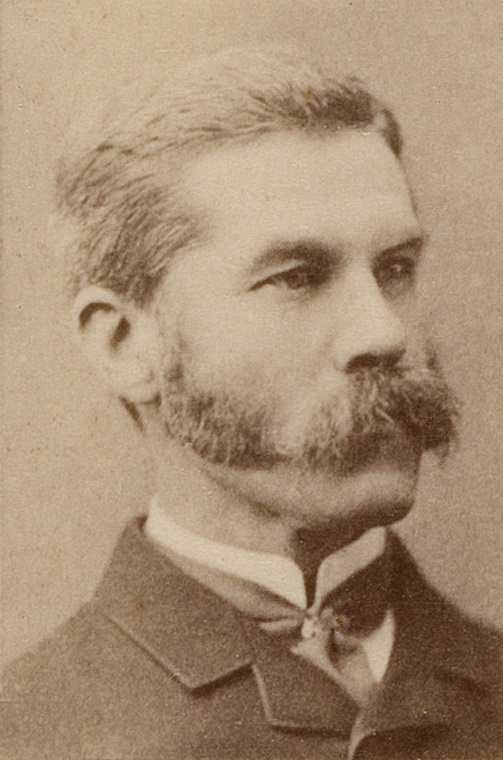

Member for Balranald (NSW Legislative Assembly)
- In office 2 December 1880 – 25 June 1894

Personal details
- Born: 22 July 1837 Northampton, England
- Died: 26 April 1928 (aged 90) Strathfield, New South Wales
- Spouse(s): (1) Alice Georgiana Foss Jarrett (2) Annie Louise Leitch (née Lavender)
- Parents: David Wilkinson (father); Elizabeth (née Bliss) (mother)

Robert Bliss Wilkinson (22 July 1837 – 26 April 1928) was an English-born Australian politician and successful businessman who was one of two parliamentary members for the New South Wales electorate of Balranald from December 1880 to June 1894. Wilkinson had experience in banking and as a pastoralist and from 1869 he and his brother-in-law and partner James S. Lavender engaged in business at Wagga Wagga as stock and station agents and auctioneers. The profitable business established branch offices at Hay, Sydney and Bourke. Wilkinson was the senior partner and the managing director after the business was formed into a limited liability company.

== Biography ==
=== Early years ===
Robert Bliss Wilkinson was born on 22 July 1837 at Northampton, England, the second son of David Wilkinson and Elizabeth (née Bliss). Robert's father was a civil engineer by profession.

Young Robert was educated at Hanwell College in west London, under the care of Rev. Dr. Emerton, a school specialising in educating boys who intended to enter military careers.

As a 15 year-old Wilkinson arrived in Victoria in November 1852 with his family, at "the height of gold fever". He "experienced a share of the many hardships and privations attendant on the then unsettled state of colonial life". In 1853 Wilkinson entered into service with the Bank of Victoria and was employed "for some years" in branch offices on the Castlemaine and Maryborough diggings. He was later employed in the Union Bank in Melbourne.

=== Stock and station business ===
In February 1863 Wilkinson's younger sister, Mary Jane, married James Smith Lavender at All Saints church in the Melbourne suburb of Prahran.^{[A]}

Wilkinson and Lavender became business partners and in 1863 they set out for the Wagga Wagga district on the Murrumbidgee River in the eastern Riverina region of New South Wales, where they purchased 'Temora' and 'The Rock' stations. In 1864 they purchased the 'Marrar' pastoral run. Later they added 'Yarangobilly' station to their landholdings.

In 1867 Lavender and Wilkinson's pastoral run, 'Yarangobilly North', was sold to A. H. Richardson. The partners made improvements to their runs "and learned much that later proved of great value to them", but by 1868 the country was in severe drought resulting in a decision to sell their properties. In September 1868 'Temora' and 'The Rock' pastoral properties were sold to J. McPherson.

After selling their pastoral runs, Wilkinson and Lavender decided to become stock and station agents. Wilkinson initially engaged in a business partnership with George Forsyth, an established storekeeper and auctioneering and stock and station agent in Wagga Wagga. In April 1869 Lavender purchased a share in the business partnership of George Forsyth and Wilkinson, which continued to trade as George Forsyth and Co. The partnership between Wilkinson and George Forsyth was formally and mutually dissolved in June 1871.

In July 1871 Wilkinson and local businessman Phineas Hann became partners, trading as Wilkinson, Hann, and Co., stock and station agents and auctioneers with an office in Fitzmaurice Street in Wagga.^{[B]}

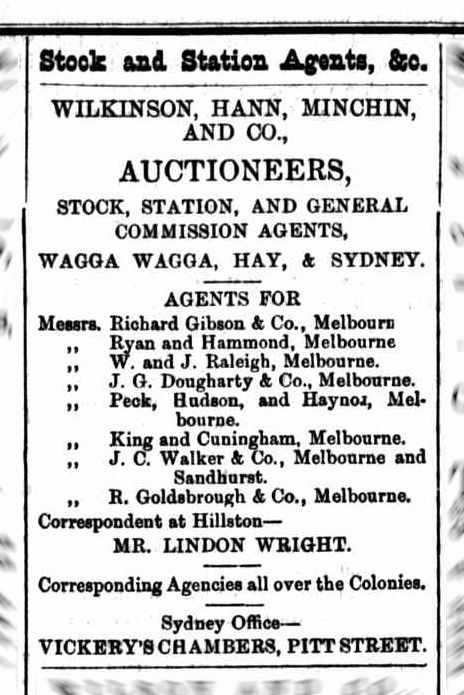
Advertisement for Wilkinson, Hann, Minchin, and Co., publishing in Wagga Wagga Advertiser, 24 August 1878.

The business established by Wilkinson and Lavender underwent personnel changes throughout the 1870s and 1880s, with new partners being admitted and retiring at various times (but with Wilkinson as the senior partner from 1871). In August 1873 the two stock and station agency firms of Wilkinson, Hann, and Co. and Mr. Stapleton Minchin amalgamated their businesses and afterwards traded as Wilkinson, Hann, Minchin, and Co.

Wilkinson arrived at Hay in June 1874 to establish a branch of Wilkinson, Hann, Minchin, and Co. there. Wilkinson used the Hay office as the headquarters of the business. Wilkinson and Lavender also established an office in Sydney, and later at Bourke on the Darling River.

In November 1875 Wilkinson's partner, James S. Lavender, married Sarah Jane ('Jennie') Hann at Emerald Hill in Melbourne (his second marriage). In 1878 J. S. Lavender took charge of the Hay office, but Wilkinson was "a frequent visitor, and always kept in personal touch with the Hay district graziers".

In September 1878 Phineas Hann retired from the partnership and the business was afterwards carried on by Wilkinson, Minchin and Lavender (under that name), stock and station agents at Sydney, Wagga Wagga and Hay. In October 1879 Warden Harry Graves was admitted as a partner to the business, which then became known as Wilkinson, Graves, Minchin, and Lavender.

=== Political career ===
In 1880 Wilkinson decided to contest the New South Wales elections for the Balranald electorate. Under the Electoral Act of 1880 the Balranald electorate was changed from a single member to a two-member electorate. In the lead-up to the election the sitting member Colin Simson announced that he did not intend "to offer himself for re-election".

Four candidates were nominated for the electorate. Wilkinson and John Cramsie, a Balranald storekeeper and shipping agent, campaigned together "as graziers' candidates for the two seats". At meetings in the electorate Wilkinson declared himself as a free trade supporter. At the election held in November 1880 Wilkinson was elected as one of the two members to represent the Balranald electorate in the New South Wales Legislative Assembly, together with John Cramsie. Wilkinson polled slightly behind Cramsie with 1,002 votes (or 34.5 percent).

In February 1881 Stapleton Minchin left the partnership, the firm then becoming known as Wilkinson, Graves and Lavender, carrying on business in co-partnership as stock and station agents and sheep and cattle salesmen.

Robert Wilkinson and Alice Georgiana Foss Jarrett were married on 15 November 1882 in the Christ Church in South Yarra, Victoria.

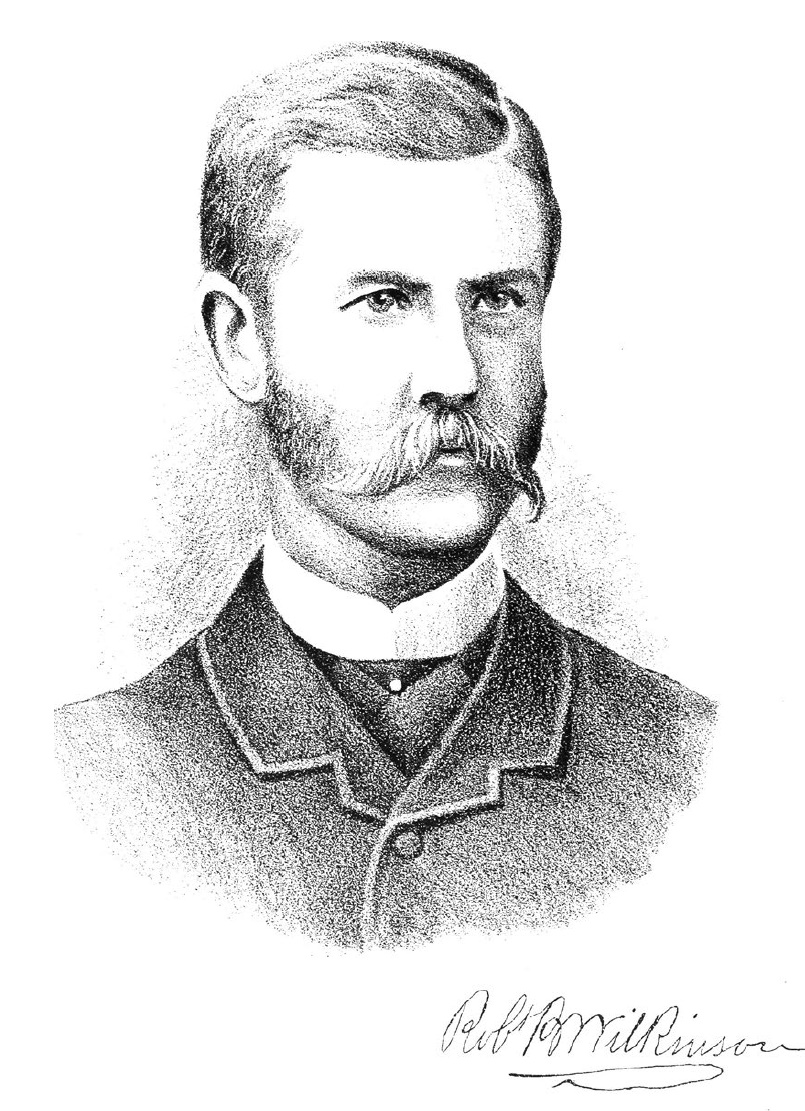
Portrait of Robert B. Wilkinson, published in Australian Men of Mark (1889).

At the general election held in December 1882 both Wilkinson and Cramsie were re-elected unopposed to represent the Balranald electorate in the New South Wales Legislative Assembly.

Wilkinson's wife Alice died of typhoid, aged 23, on 9 April 1884 in New South Wales.

Wilkinson was a prominent voice in parliament in connection with the Land Act of 1884. Prior to those reforms a landholder had wide choice as to which part of his run could be selected, a situation leading to corrupt practices such as 'dummying' and causing "endless friction with the selectors". The 1884 Act divided the pastoral runs into leasehold and resumed areas and confined selection to the resumed sections of a holding. Although it did not entirely eliminate 'dummying', the Land Act "was a great boon to the pastoral industry... [and] put the smaller man on a better footing and led to more cordial relations between the two classes of holders".

Wilkinson's "trenchant criticism" of the Federation Enabling Bill of 1885 is recognised as being a critical factor in the defeat of the legislation in New South Wales. The British legislation sought to enable the creation of the Federal Council of Australasia, a precursor to Australian Federation. Although he was in favour of the federation of the Australian colonies, Wilkinson "opposed the measure then introduced because of its anomalies and ill-digested form".

At the general election held in October 1885 there were three nominations, but both Wilkinson and Cramsie were re-elected to represent the Balranald electorate in the New South Wales Legislative Assembly. Wilkinson topped the poll with 1,025 votes (or 37.2 percent).

In November 1886 Warden Harry Graves retired from the partnership by mutual consent. The business was then carried on by Wilkinson and Lavender (under that name). In September 1889 Wilkinson and Lavender admitted Thomas William Chapman as a partner in the business, which then became known as Wilkinson, Lavender and Chapman.

At the 1887 general election three candidates nominated for the Balranald electorate, Wilkinson (the sitting member and a free trade supporter) and two supporters of protectionism, Allen Lakeman and A. L. P. Cameron. At the election held in February 1887 Wilkinson was re-elected along with Lakeman. Wilkinson polled behind Lakeman with 777 votes (or 33.2 percent). Both Wilkinson and Lakeman were re-elected unopposed at the New South Wales election of February 1889.

Robert Wilkinson and Annie Louisa Leitch were married on 26 February 1890 in the Sydney suburb of Burwood (his second marriage). The couple had three children, two daughters and a son.

There were four nominations for the 1891 general election, Wilkinson and Lakeman (the sitting members), the protectionist A. L. P. Cameron and James Newton, a candidate with working-class and union support. At the election held in June and early July 1891 Wilkinson and Newton were elected to represent the electoral district of Balranald. Wilkinson polled behind Newton with 705 votes (or 26 percent).

Wilkinson decided to retire from politics at the end of his term in June 1894. He was given a public dinner at Hay and received "a substantial presentation". At the dinner it was revealed that Wilkinson was "taking his political farewell" because of an affliction of the eyes and a desire to focus more on his business interests.

=== Company structure ===
Wilkinson's partner and brother-in-law, James S. Lavender, died in Sydney on 17 November 1899. After Lavender's death Wilkinson assumed sole control of the business.

In May 1903 the stock and station agency firm of Wilkinson and Lavender was formed into a limited liability company named Wilkinson and Lavender Ltd. No shares were issued to the public; the change was reported to have been made "in order to give the staff of the firm a share in the business which they have assisted to build up". Robert B. Wilkinson continued in his principal supervisory role, becoming managing director of the company. His nephew Frank Lavender continued as manager of the Hay office.

Wilkinson was a trustee of the Pastoralists' Union of New South Wales from its inception in 1891 until 1921.

=== Last years ===
In about mid-1927 Wilkinson retired as managing director of the business and was replaced by his nephew Frank Lavender. However in November 1927 Lavender died suddenly in Melbourne, aged 51, after which Wilkinson again took on the role as managing director, a position he still held at the time of his death in 1928.

Robert Bliss Wilkinson died on 26 April 1928 at his home, 'Wilga', The Boulevarde, Strathfield, aged 90. He was buried in the churchyard of St. Thomas' Anglican church in Enfield.

== Notes ==
A. James Smith Lavender was born in 1828 in Bedfordshire, England, the son of a farmer. He emigrated to Victoria in 1852, attracted by reports about the Australian goldfields. Lavender took up a pastoral run at 'Oakwood Park' near Dandenong, "where for some years" he raised cattle and horses. Lavender's first wife, Mary Jane (née Wilkinson), died on 12 September 1870, at No. 2 Barkly Terrace, Grey Street, East Melbourne, aged 28.

B. Phineas Hann (1839-1919) was born at Tintinhull in county Somerset, England. He began in business at Wagga Wagga as a storekeeper, trading as Forsyth and Hann.

New South Wales Legislative Assembly
Preceded by Colin Simson	Member for Balranald; 1880–1894; Served alongside: Cramsie/Lakeman/Newton	Abolished
