= Joseph Phelps (Australian politician) =

Australian politician

Joseph James Phelps (died 13 April 1890) was an Australian politician.

He was a Quaker pastoralist at Albermarle Station, Menindee, New South Wales. In 1864 he was elected to the New South Wales Legislative Assembly for Balranald. He served until his retirement in 1877. Phelps died at Limerick in Ireland in 1890.

New South Wales Legislative Assembly
Preceded by Augustus Morris	Member for Balranald; 1864–1877	Succeeded by Colin Simson
