= John Cramsie =

Australian politician (1831–1910)

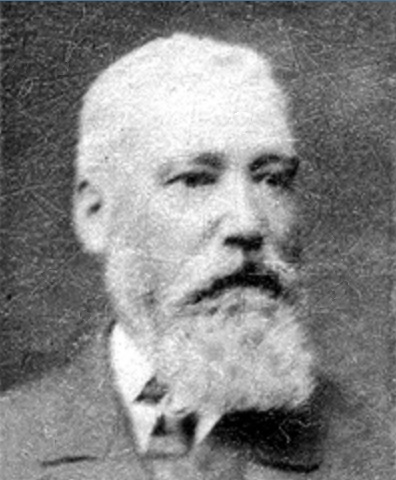

Member for Balranald (NSW Legislative Assembly)
- In office 2 December 1880 – 7 October 1885

Personal details
- Born: 23 December 1831 Ballymoney, county Antrim, Ireland
- Died: 18 February 1910 (aged 78) Randwick, New South Wales
- Spouse: Lillias Rankin
- Parents: William Cramsie (father); Ann (née Boyd) (mother)

John Cramsie (23 December 1831 – 18 February 1910) was an Irish-born Australian politician and successful businessman who was one of two parliamentary members for the New South Wales electorate of Balranald from December 1880 to October 1885. Cramsie had previously established a business as a storekeeper at Balranald in the Riverina district of New South Wales. He formed a successful partnership with John C. Bowden in 1873, which traded as Cramsie, Bowden and Co., opening branch stores, distributing station supplies and carrying wool on steamers and barges on the network of inland rivers.

== Biography ==
=== Early years ===
John Cramsie was born on 23 December 1831 at Ballymoney in County Antrim, Ireland, the son of William Cramsie and Ann (née Boyd).

Cramsie emigrated to Victoria in about 1855-57. He lived "for some time" at Swan Hill, on the Victorian side of the Murray River.

=== Balranald ===
By early 1859 Cramsie was working as a storekeeper and postmaster at Balranald on the lower Murrumbidgee River in the Riverina district of New South Wales. The general store at Balranald, known as the Post-office Store, operated under the name of Sparkes, Cramsie and Co., a partnership of general storekeepers between George Bagley Perkins, Thomas Harrison Sparkes and John Cramsie. In April 1860 the partnership between Perkins, Sparkes and Cramsie was dissolved by mutual consent. Cramsie and Sparkes carried on the business in co-partnership under the existing name of Sparkes, Cramsie and Co. In August 1860 Sparkes, Cramsie and Co. was granted a wholesale spirit license, the first to be procured in Balranald.

John Cramsie and Lillias Rankin were married on 26 November 1863 at St. Kilian's church at Bendigo, Victoria. The couple had had ten children, born from 1864 to 1882.^{[A]}

Cramsie's partner, Thomas H. Sparkes, died in March 1868 at Balranald. In July 1868 Cramsie purchased his late partner's share in the storekeeping business at Balranald.

=== Riverina businesses ===
In March 1870 Cramsie and two other local storekeepers entered into a partnership "for the purpose of amalgamating their business". Cramsie's Post-office Store at Balranald and stores at Euston and Balranald hitherto carried on by Maurice Aron and Louis Gerstman were consolidated and conducted under the name of John Cramsie and Co. Their goods for sale, purchased wholesale from Victoria, amounted to sixty thousand pounds per annum and the firm exported approximately five thousand bales of wool each year, on their own account and for those they represented. In Balranald John Cramsie and Co. owned a "very fine" brick store, a wool store, a large galvanised iron building and several smaller buildings. In September 1871 the partnership between Cramsie, Aron and Gerstman (trading as John Cramsie and Co.) was dissolved by mutual consent. The business was carried on by Cramsie and Aron under the existing name.

In August 1873 the partnership between John Cramsie and Maurice Aron, general storekeepers at Balranald and Euston, trading as John Cramsie and Co., was dissolved. The business at Balranald was continued by Cramsie and the Euston business carried on by Aron. A Geelong storekeeper, John Clark Bowden, purchased Aron's share of the Balranald storekeeping business, with Cramsie and Bowden then becoming partners. From July 1875 the partnership between Cramsie and Bowden was carried on under the name Cramsie, Bowden and Co. The Balranald store was located in Court Street, from where an extensive wholesale and retail business was carried out.^{[B]}

In about April 1877 Cramsie, Bowden and Co. purchased the river steamer Kelpie. The partnership also began operating the Rodney paddle-steamer in 1877. Cramsie, Bowden and Co. specialised in station supplies and operated steamers and barges on the inland rivers. The business traded largely on the Murrumbidgee and Darling rivers, both in store supplies and the carriage of wool to and from Echuca on the Murray River. The partnership opened branches at Hay, Wentworth and Wilcannia.

From May 1879 Cramsie, Bowden and Co. advertised their services as shipping agents, with offices at Balranald, Wilcannia and Echuca. At their peak the business had a fleet of thirteen steamers and barges trading on the Murray, Murrumbidgee, Darling and Edward rivers, including the Kelpie, Rodney, Pearl and Goldbrough steamers. During the wool season the business employed close to one thousand workers, with "the firm's name being a household word in the Riverina and on the Darling River".

=== Political career ===
In 1880 Cramsie decided to contest the New South Wales elections for the Balranald electorate. In the lead-up to the election the sitting member Colin Simson announced that he did not intend "to offer himself for re-election". Four candidates were nominated for the electorate, which would return two members. At the election held in November 1880 Cramsie was elected as one of the two members to represent the Balranald electorate in the New South Wales Legislative Assembly, together with Robert Wilkinson. Cramsie topped the poll with 1,039 votes (or 35.8 percent).

In 1881 Cramsie, Bowden and Co. were sending stores from Wilcannia to the Mount Browne goldfields. By August 1881 the partnership had established a store at the diggings.

In May 1882 the partnership between John Cramsie, John Clark Bowden and Arthur Woodfall, operating as general merchants and storekeepers at Wilcannia, Milparinka and Tibooburra, was dissolved by mutual agreement. The stores at those places was carried on by Woodfall, in partnership with Peter Swanson and Thomas Wakefield Chambers.

At the general election held in December 1882 both Cramsie and Wilkinson were re-elected unopposed to represent the Balranald electorate in the New South Wales Legislative Assembly.

At the general election held in October 1885 there were three nominations, but both Cramsie and Wilkinson were re-elected to represent the Balranald electorate in the New South Wales Legislative Assembly. Cramsie polled behind Wilkinson with 941 votes (or 34.1 percent).

Cramsie did not contest a seat at the New South Wales election in February 1887. In April 1887 the partnership between John Cramsie and John C. Bowden, trading as Cramsie, Bowden and Co., was dissolved by mutual consent. Bowden continued in "the several businesses on his own account", under the name of J. C. Bowden and Co.

Cramsie's wife Lillias died on 12 June 1888, aged 43, at her residence 'Balranald' in Bruce Street in the Sydney suburb of Ashfield.

Cramsie owned or had financial interests in a number of pastoral stations, including 'Tibbereenah' (near Narrabri), 'Kilfera' (near Ivanhoe, north of the Lachlan River), 'Glendon' (near Warwick in Queensland) and 'Strathdarr' in the Longreach district of Queensland.

=== Later years ===
John Cramsie died on 18 February 1910, aged 78, at 'The Pines' private hospital in Randwick, "after a lengthy illness".

== Notes ==
A. The children of John and Lillias Cramsie: (1) William Augustine Cramsie, born in 1864; (2) Jessie A. Cramsie, born in 1866; (3) James Rankin Cramsie, born in August 1869 at Glen Innes; (4) John Boyd Cramsie, born in March 1871 at Balranald; (5) Angus Duncan Cramsie, born in about 1873; (6) Lillias May Cramsie, born in 1874; (7) Alexander Stuart Cramsie, born in 1875; (8) Charles Henry Wrexford Cramsie, born in October 1876 at St. Kilda (in Melbourne); (9) Ronald Herbert Cramsie, born in 1880; (10) Reginald Cecil Cramsie, born in 1882.

B. John Clark Bowden was born in Geelong in 1844. He began business there as a grocer and later came to the Riverina district of New South Wales.

New South Wales Legislative Assembly
Preceded by Colin Simson	Member for Balranald; 1880–1887; Served alongside: Robert Wilkinson	Succeeded by Allen Lakeman
