= Electoral district of Balranald =

Former state electoral district of New South Wales, Australia

Balranald was an electoral district of the Legislative Assembly in the Australian state of New South Wales established from part of Lachlan and Lower Darling in 1859 and named after and including Balranald. From 1880 to 1894, it elected two members. In 1894, it was abolished and partly replaced by Deniliquin and Hay.

== Members for Balranald ==
Single-member (1859–1880)					
Member	Party	Term			
Augustus Morris	None	1859–1864			
Joseph Phelps	None	1864–1877			
Colin Simson	None	1877–1880			
Two members (1880–1894)
Member	Party	Term	Member	Party	Term
Robert Wilkinson	None	1880–1887	John Cramsie	None	1880–1887
Robert Wilkinson	Ind. Free Trade	1887–1889	Allen Lakeman	Ind. Protectionist	1887–1889
Robert Wilkinson	Free Trade	1889–1894	Allen Lakeman	Protectionist	1889–1891
Robert Wilkinson	Free Trade	1889–1894	James Newton	Labour	1891–1894

== Election results ==
1891 New South Wales colonial election: Balranald Monday 29 June
Party	Candidate	Votes	%	±%
Labour	James Newton (elected 1)	828	30.5	
Free Trade	Robert Wilkinson (elected 2)	705	26.0	
Protectionist	Allen Lakeman	650	23.9	
Protectionist	A L P Cameron	532	19.6	
Total formal votes		2,715	99.2	
Informal votes		22	0.8	
Turnout		1,639	43.2	
Labour gain 1 from Protectionist				
Free Trade hold 1				
