= Cobb Highway =

Highway in New South Wales, Australia

Cobb Highway New South Wales–Victoria
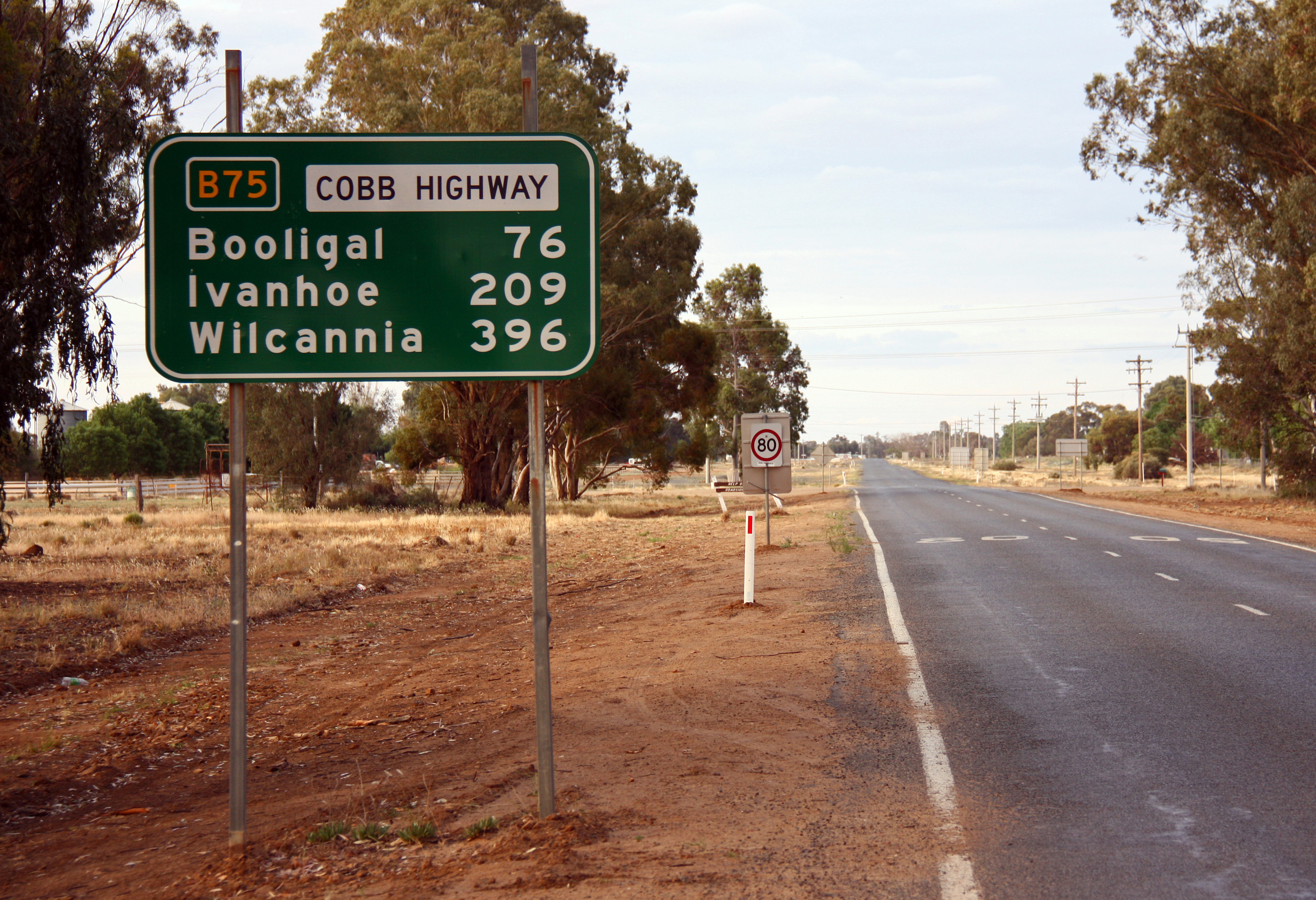
- Cobb Highway just outside Hay towards Ivanhoe

General information
- Type: Highway
- Length: 571 km (355 mi)
- Gazetted: August 1928 (as Main Road 60); March 1938 (as State Highway 21)
- Route number(s): B75 (2013–present)
- Former route number: National Route 75 (1955–2013)

Major junctions
- North end: Barrier Highway; Wilcannia, New South Wales
- Mid-Western Highway; Sturt Highway; Riverina Highway
- South end: Northern Highway; NSW/VIC border

Location(s)
- Major settlements: Ivanhoe, Booligal, Hay, Deniliquin

Highway system
- Highways in Australia; National Highway • Freeways in Australia; Highways in New South Wales; Highways in Victoria

Cobb Highway is a state highway in the western Riverina and the far western regions of New South Wales, with a short section in Victoria, Australia, designated part of route B75.

Initially an amalgam of stock routes, the 571-kilometre (355 mi) highway extends from the Victorian border north across central New South Wales to Wilcannia, and was named in honour of the Cobb & Co stagecoach company. The highway follows an old coach route through the Riverina, connecting the Murray, Murrumbidgee and Lachlan rivers, and across the intervening plains to the Darling River at Wilcannia. Cobb Highway also connects the Barrier, Mid-Western, Sturt, and Riverina highways.

== Route ==
From north to south, Cobb Highway begins at its junction with Barrier Highway near Wilcannia, and runs south through the townships of Ivanhoe, Booligal, Hay and Deniliquin. Its southern terminus is in Echuca, Victoria, at a roundabout located approximately 2 kilometres (1.2 mi) southwest of Moama where the highway crosses the New South Wales–Victoria border at the Murray River and continues south as Northern Highway, also designated route B75.

The highway travels through diverse changes in scenery, from the Murray River, enclosed farming land in the Riverina, to open grazing land and semi-desert towards the middle and northern sections.

The speed limit is posted at 100 km/h (62 mph), except for three sections where the limit is 110 km/h (68 mph): 40 kilometres (25 mi) north of Deniliquin until Hay, Hay until a few kilometres north of Booligal, and from just south of Mossgiel to Ivanhoe. It is a sealed single carriageway for its entire length.

== History ==
The passing of the Main Roads Act of 1924 through the Parliament of New South Wales provided for the declaration of Main Roads, roads partially funded by the State government through the Main Roads Board (MRB). Main Road No. 60 was declared along this road on 8 August 1928, from the bridge over the Murray River at Moama, via Deniliquin and Hay to the intersection with Mid-Western Highway at Booligal; with the passing of the Main Roads (Amendment) Act of 1929 to provide for additional declarations of State Highways and Trunk Roads, this was amended to Trunk Road 60 on 8 April 1929. When Mid-Western Highway was re-routed to run via Hay instead of Booligal on 24 September 1929, the declaration remained unchanged.

The Department of Main Roads, which had succeeded the MRB in 1932, declared State Highway 21 on 16 March 1938, from the state border with Victoria on the Murray River at Moama via Deniliquin to the intersection with Sturt Highway near Hay, then from the intersection with Mid-Western Highway in Hay, via Booligal to the intersection with Barrier Highway south of Wilcannia, then from Wilcannia via White Cliffs, Cobham Lake, Milparkinka and Tibooburra to the state border with Queensland at Olive Downs, subsuming Trunk Road 60. This was altered to run continuously through Hay, subsuming the small portion of Mid-Western Highway previously terminating at the intersection with Sturt Highway, on 12 January 1944; Mid-Western Highway was re-declared to terminate at the intersection with State Highway 21 in Hay as a result. With the declaration of State Highway 22 (later Silver City Highway) subsuming the alignment between Cobham Lake and the state border with Queensland on 24 January 1945, its northern end was truncated to end at the intersection with Barrier Highway south of Wilcannia; the former alignment between Wilcannia via White Cliffs to Kayrunnera was declared as Main Road 435.

State Highway 21 was named Cobb Highway on 23 April 1947, in honour of Cobb and Co, a company which ran a network of stagecoaches in inland Australia in the latter half of the 19th century and early in the 20th century.

The passing of the Roads Act of 1993 through the Parliament of New South Wales updated road classifications and the way they could be declared within New South Wales. Under this act, Cobb Highway today retains its declaration as Highway 21, from the state border with Victoria at Moama via Deniliquin, Hay, Booligal and Ivanhoe to the intersection with Barrier Highway south of Wilcannia.

Cobb Highway was signed National Route 75 across its entire length in 1955. With the conversion to the newer alphanumeric system in 2013, this was replaced with route B75.

Cobb Highway is part of a significant travelling stock routes network in New South Wales. The highway is the focus of a major tourism initiative entitled The Long Paddock, developed by the shires along the route (Murray, Deniliquin, Conargo, Hay and Central Darling). The Long Paddock project aims to develop sustainable communities along the Cobb Highway through the development of a dynamic cultural heritage touring route. The project uses the consistent theme of transportation, involving elements of history, creative interpretation and local environment, to link the communities along the highway.

=== Upgrades ===
==== Bridges ====
In May 1969 a bridge over the Edward River at Deniliquin was constructed (replacing a timber bridge built in 1895). In June 1973 a bridge over Murrumbidgee River at Hay was built (replacing the 1874 opening bridge).

A project to build an extra bridge over the Murray River linking Echuca and Moama commenced in late 2017 and concluded with its opening on 11 April 2022. The project had a total cost of $323.7 million, and was jointly funded by the Australian, Victorian and NSW governments.

==== Sealing ====
In 2011, work began to seal the 132 km (82 mi) of the highway that remained unsealed. Alongside concurrent works on the Silver City Highway, this was done as part of a $195 million project by the NSW Government to complete the sealing of the state's highway network. An official opening ceremony was held in November 2023 at the final section of highway to be sealed, near Halfway Tree between Wilcannia and Ivanhoe.

== Major intersections ==
| State | LGA | Location | km | mi | Destinations | Notes |
|---|---|---|---|---|---|---|
| New South Wales | Central Darling | Wilcannia | 0 | 0.0 | Barrier Highway (A32) – Cobar, Dubbo, Wilcannia, Broken Hill | Northern terminus of highway and route B75 |
| New South Wales | Central Darling | Ivanhoe | 157 | 98 | Ivanhoe–Menindee Road – Menindee | |
| New South Wales | Central Darling | Ivanhoe | 162 | 101 | Balranald Road – Balranald, Swan Hill | |
| New South Wales | Central Darling | Ivanhoe | 163 | 101 | Behring Street, to Cobar–Ivanhoe Road (The Wool Track) – Cobar | |
| New South Wales | Carrathool | Mossgiel | 212 | 132 | Mossgiel Trunk Road – Hillston, Griffith | |
| New South Wales | Hay | Hay | 370 | 230 | Mid-Western Highway (B64) – Goolgowi, West Wyalong, Bathurst, Sydney | |
| New South Wales | Hay | Hay | 371 | 231 | Cadell Street, to Maude Road – Maude | |
| New South Wales | Murrumbidgee River | | 372 | 231 | Bridge over the river (no known name) | |
| New South Wales | Hay | Hay South | 373 | 232 | Sturt Highway (A20) – Adelaide, Mildura, Balranald, Sydney | Roundabout |
| New South Wales | Hay | Hay South | 381 | 237 | Jerilderie Road – Jerilderie | |
| New South Wales | Conargo | Pretty Pine | 477 | 296 | Moulamein Road – Moulamein | |
| New South Wales | Deniliquin | Deniliquin | 493 | 306 | Riverina Highway (B58) – Finley, Berrigan, Albury | Roundabout |
| New South Wales | Edward River | | 494 | 307 | National Bridge | |
| New South Wales | Deniliquin | Deniliquin | 496 | 308 | Deniliquin–Barham Road (southwest) – Barham, Kerang; Ochtertyre Street (northwest), to Wakool Road – Wakool, Moulamein | Roundabout |
| New South Wales | Murray | Moama | 554 | 344 | Barmah Road – Barmah, Nathalia | |
| New South Wales | Murray | Moama | 567 | 352 | Perricoota Road – Womboota | |
| New South Wales | Murray | Moama | 568 | 353 | Meninya Street – Moama | |
| New South Wales | Murray River | | 569 | 354 | Dhungala Bridge | |
| State border | | | 569 | 354 | New South Wales – Victoria border | |
| Victoria | Campaspe River | | 570.5 | 354.5 | Yakoa Bridge | |
| Victoria | Campaspe | Echuca | 571 | 355 | Warren Street (B75 west, C349 east) – Bendigo, Melbourne | Southern highway terminus at roundabout; route B75 continues west along Northern Highway |
Route transition

== See also ==
- Highways in Australia
- List of highways in New South Wales
