= Mossgiel, New South Wales =

Former town in New South Wales, Australia

Mossgiel
- Town
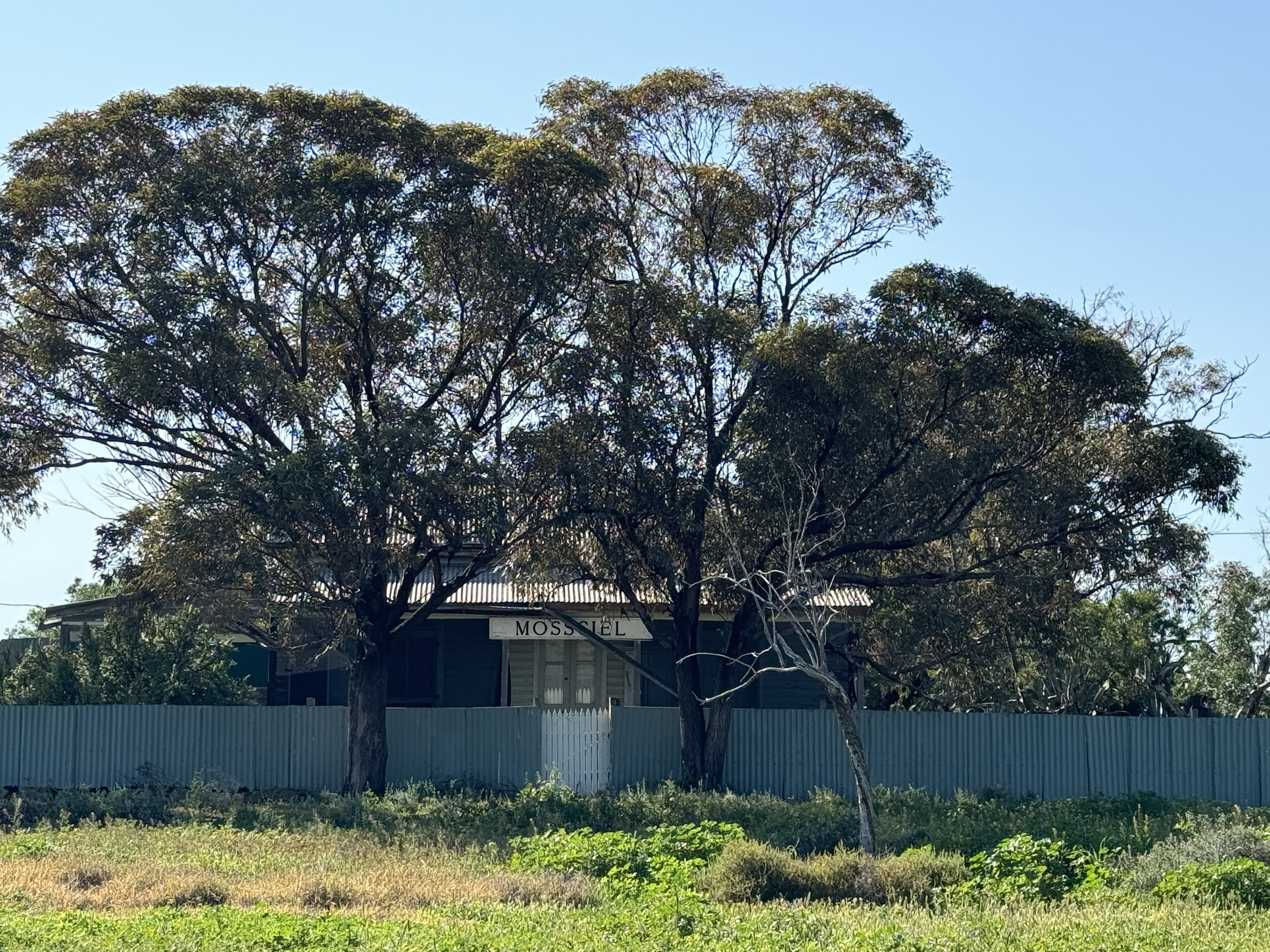
- Former post office at Mossgiel, the only building remaining from the original town

- Coordinates: 33°15′S 144°34′E
- Country: Australia
- State: New South Wales
- LGA: Carrathool Shire
- Location: 776 km (482 mi) W of Sydney; 583 km (362 mi) N of Melbourne; 208 km (129 mi) NW of Griffith; 99 km (62 mi) W of Hillston

Government
  - State electorate: Murray
  - Federal division: Farrer

Population
  - Total: 26 (2021 census)
- Postcode: 2878

Mossgiel is a location in New South Wales, Australia, in Carrathool Shire. It was a township on the coach route between the Lachlan and Darling Rivers (now the Cobb Highway), 50 km southeast of Ivanhoe near the junction with the road to Hillston. The settlement experienced a steady decline during the 20th century. Nowadays Mossgiel township consists of one house (which was once the post office) and a community hall.

Mossgiel was named after Mossgiel farm near Lochlea, in Ayrshire, Scotland, the farm of the poet Robert Burns and his brother Gilbert.

== History ==
In about 1864 the Desailly brothers (Francis and George) established 'Mossgiel' and 'Booligal' stations. 'Mossgiel' run was a back block station so a great effort was required to provide water for stock. The Desaillys employed a large cohort of men to fence, dig tanks and sink wells, "and imported the first centrifugal pump and steam engine in the Riverina". Water raised by whims and by the steam-driven pump was fed into iron troughs at each well.

In about October 1868 Thomas Grace and John Kilbride began a coach service between Booligal and towns on the Darling River, extending as far as Mount Murchison township (Wilcannia). In late 1868 Robert Riordan built a hotel at Mossgiel (on the coach route to the Darling). He was granted a publican's license for the Mossgiel Hotel in February 1869. At about the same time it was reported that George Williamson, the proprietor of the Post-office Store at Booligal, was "about to put up a large general store at Mossgiel". In December 1869 William Carter was granted a hotel license for the Wool-pack Hotel at Mossgiel.

In January 1870 a post-office was established at Mossgiel with J. Herbert Taylor as postmaster. By December 1872 a blacksmith, William Barns, and a saddler, J. J. Allen, had started businesses in the township. In April 1873 the Hay Police Court refused an application by Henry Jonsen for a publican's license at Mossgiel on the grounds that "there are two [hotels] already there and no town whatever, only the Mossgiel station". It was added: "The drinking there is said to be fearful".

In 1878 Isadore Galland opened a "large and commodious store" at Mossgiel selling "Grocery, Drapery, Boots, &c., &c.". Galland also had "two hawker's waggons constantly on the road with a large and varied supply of goods".

A public school began at Mossgiel in 1886 (initially given provisional status). It was upgraded to full public school status in 1890.

The Federation Drought of 1901 to 1903 had a devastating impact on Mossgiel and district. After the long drought there was few if any stock left in the district and stations had closed down, with only caretaker staff in charge. The normal supply routes by teamsters were disrupted so flour, fodder and other essentials had to be brought by camel teams from Wilcannia to Ivanhoe and then on to Mossgiel by coach. By early 1903 the Government tank supplying domestic water to Mossgiel was dry and water had to be carted eleven miles from 'Lignum Park' station.

In February 1904, not long after the drought had broken, Mossgiel was subject to a sand storm from the south-west that "raged at hurricane speed for sixty hours without intermission". The storm was "the worst witnessed by the oldest residents". In the aftermath many of the buildings in the town had "sand-hills on all sides". Galland's store could only be accessed from one end of the verandah, with "a perfect mountain of sand" being kept back "by placing sheets of galvanised iron along the verandah posts".

In November 1915 it was stated that the population of Mossgiel "including school children and babies, was about 30 or 40".

In 1936 it was reported that "in consequence of the railway passing through Ivanhoe, 35 miles distant, Mossgiel township has dwindled so greatly in importance, that the cottage hospital and the only hotel have been closed".

== Natural environment ==
=== Mossgiel daisy ===
The threatened Mossgiel daisy (Brachyscome papillosa) is named after the Mossgiel region, one of the locations where it is known to occur . It is a multi-stemmed, perennial herb, having mauve flowers with a yellow centre. The Mossgiel daisy occurs in scattered sites across the Riverina Bioregion, primarily in clay soils in association with bladder saltbush (Atriplex vesicaria) and leafless bluebush (Maireana aphylla).
