= Booligal =

- Town
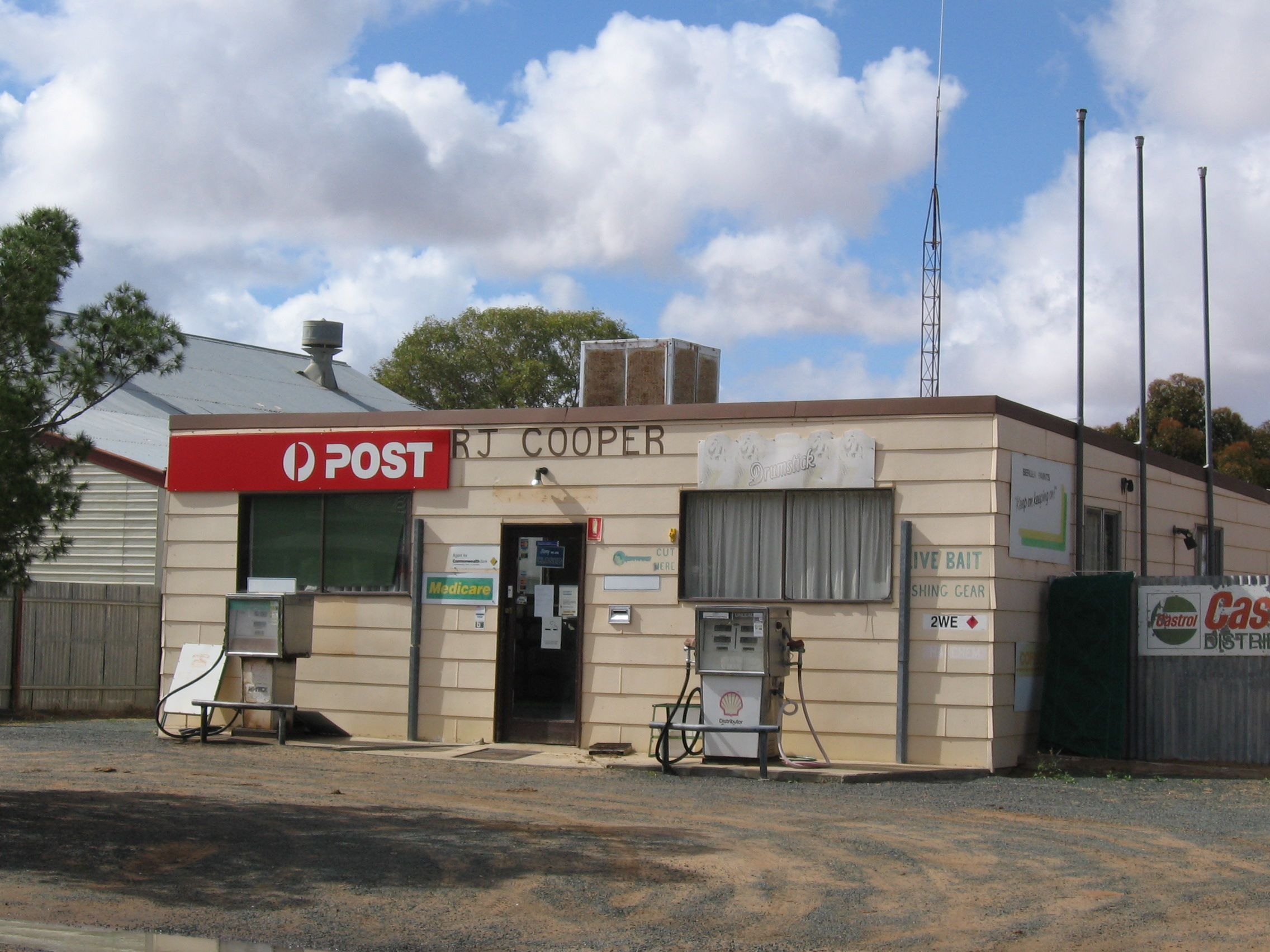
- General store

- Coordinates: 33°52′0″S 144°53′0″E
- Country: Australia
- State: New South Wales
- LGA: Hay Shire
- Location: 757 km (470 mi) from Sydney; 215 km (134 mi) from Griffith; 102 km (63 mi) from Ivanhoe; 41 km (25 mi) from One Tree

Government
  - State electorate: Murray
  - Federal division: Farrer
- Elevation: 83 m (272 ft)

Population
  - Total: 95 (2016 census)
- Postcode: 2711
- County: Waljeers

Booligal /ˈbuːlɪɡəl/ is a village in the Riverina area of western New South Wales (NSW), Australia. It is located on the Cobb Highway, on the Lachlan River north of Hay. Booligal is a part of Hay Shire local government area.

The name of the village is an anglicisation of an Aboriginal word meaning either (1) 'windy place', or (2) 'large swamp', 'place of flooded box trees'.

== History ==
Booligal is situated on the traditional boundary of the Muthi Muthi and Nari Nari Aboriginal tribes.

=== Township beginnings ===
The site where Booligal township developed was originally a crossing-place on the Lachlan River on the "Boolegal" pastoral run (which had been taken up by the Tom brothers). The township developed on the opposite side of the river to "Boolegal" station (later known as "Bank" station). The builder Edward Roset and his family were living at the locality by about 1856. Edward Roset's wife Bridget died on 27 February 1857, just one week after her 22-month-old daughter had died of dysentery; Bridget Roset and her daughter were the first interments in the Booligal cemetery. Edward Roset constructed a hotel at Booligal (possibly in collaboration with Neil McColl), which probably operated initially as a sly-grog shop. In 1859 Robert Whiteus was operating a punt at the locality.

The township of Booligal was laid out by Surveyor Edward Twynam and gazetted as a township in July 1860. In December 1860 it was reported that a store and two public-houses were being erected in the new township. Licences for the two hotels were initially refused by the Bench of Magistrates at Hay "on account of there being no police belonging to the locality". On appeal however the applications for licences at Booligal were granted. Neil McColl became the licensee of the Drovers' Arms Hotel (possibly the renovated Roset's hotel) and John Ledwidge was granted a licence for the Booligal Hotel. On 31 January 1861 – "the first red letter day at this new township on the Lower Lachlan" – both hotels were opened to the public.

In March 1861 the Adelaide firm of Randell and Scott opened a store at Booligal. The manager, Thomas Hitchcox, was briefly postmaster. Booligal Post Office opened on 7 March 1861 (it was closed between 1866 and 1881). In August 1862 it was reported that both hotels at Booligal were closed and the two publicans were insolvent. Hitchcock resigned as storekeeper to take over the licence of the Booligal Hotel. Another Adelaide firm, Morgan and Pollard, opened a second store at Booligal by 1863, managed by Henry N. Smith, who became postmaster until his death in June 1868.

=== 1870 to 1900 ===
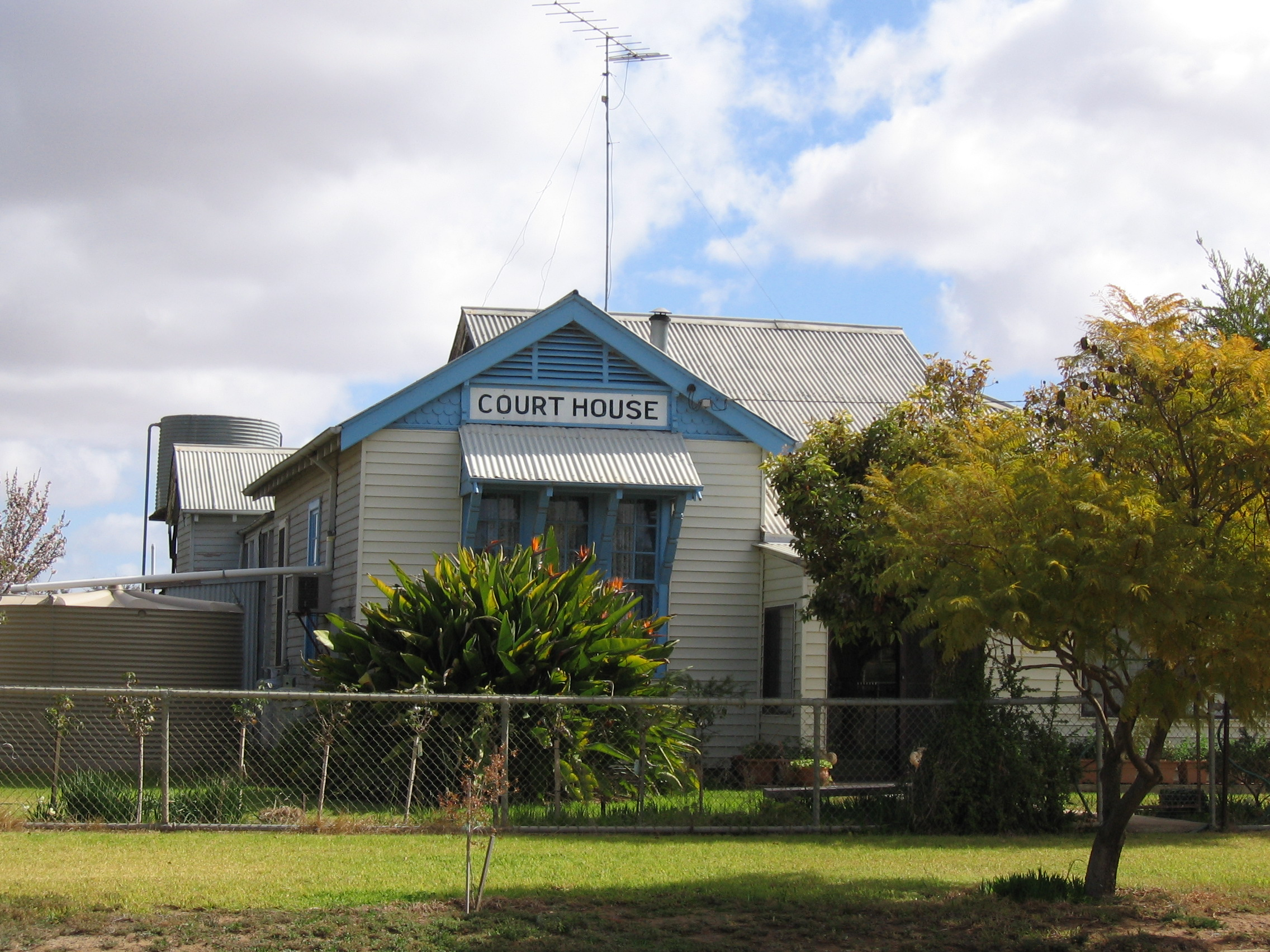
Historic court house

During 1871–2 Edward Roset had a bridge built over the Lachlan River at Booligal: "Mr. Roset is showing himself a man of extraordinary public spirit, he is bridging the Lachlan with an immensely strong bridge, the piles are three feet diameter at the butt, and driven twelve feet into the bed of the river; the approaches are excellent, and work to the present time has cost over £2,000, and it is half done". Roset's new bridge (for which he charged a toll for its use) was opened for sheep traffic on 3 September 1872 (and for general traffic later in the year). The bridge, which still remains at the lower end of Lachlan Street, was built above flood level and flanked by extensive banked-up approaches.

In April 1877 it was reported that Booligal consisted of nineteen buildings, including a court-house, two hotels, two stores, a blacksmith's shop and two butchers' shops, as well as a school-house and a parsonage. The school-house and parsonage were new buildings, still incomplete. At that stage the population of Booligal was over 100 persons.

In 1878 the telegraph line was extended to Booligal.

Booligal's position on the direct transport route linking the Murrumbidgee and Darling rivers ensured its importance in the district during the latter half of the 19th century. Drays hauling wool from stations north of the Lachlan passed through the township in large numbers, and station supplies were transported in the opposite direction. Booligal was a major stopping-place for the mail and passenger coach travelling between Hay and Wilcannia on the Darling River.

In 1890 Booligal had a population of about 500 people.

=== 1901 to the present ===
A new public bridge was built at Booligal in 1912 (replaced in 1984 by the current concrete structure). A telephone exchange was opened there on 3 June 1913.

In 1914 the transport link between Hay and Wilcannia ceased to operate. Booligal had been experiencing a steady decline, especially since the protracted drought at the turn of the century. Many residents of the town and district moved to the new township of Griffith after the First World War.

In 1967 a memorial to explorer and surveyor John Oxley was erected at Booligal; the monument is in the form of a giant theodolite set in stone.

== Facilities ==
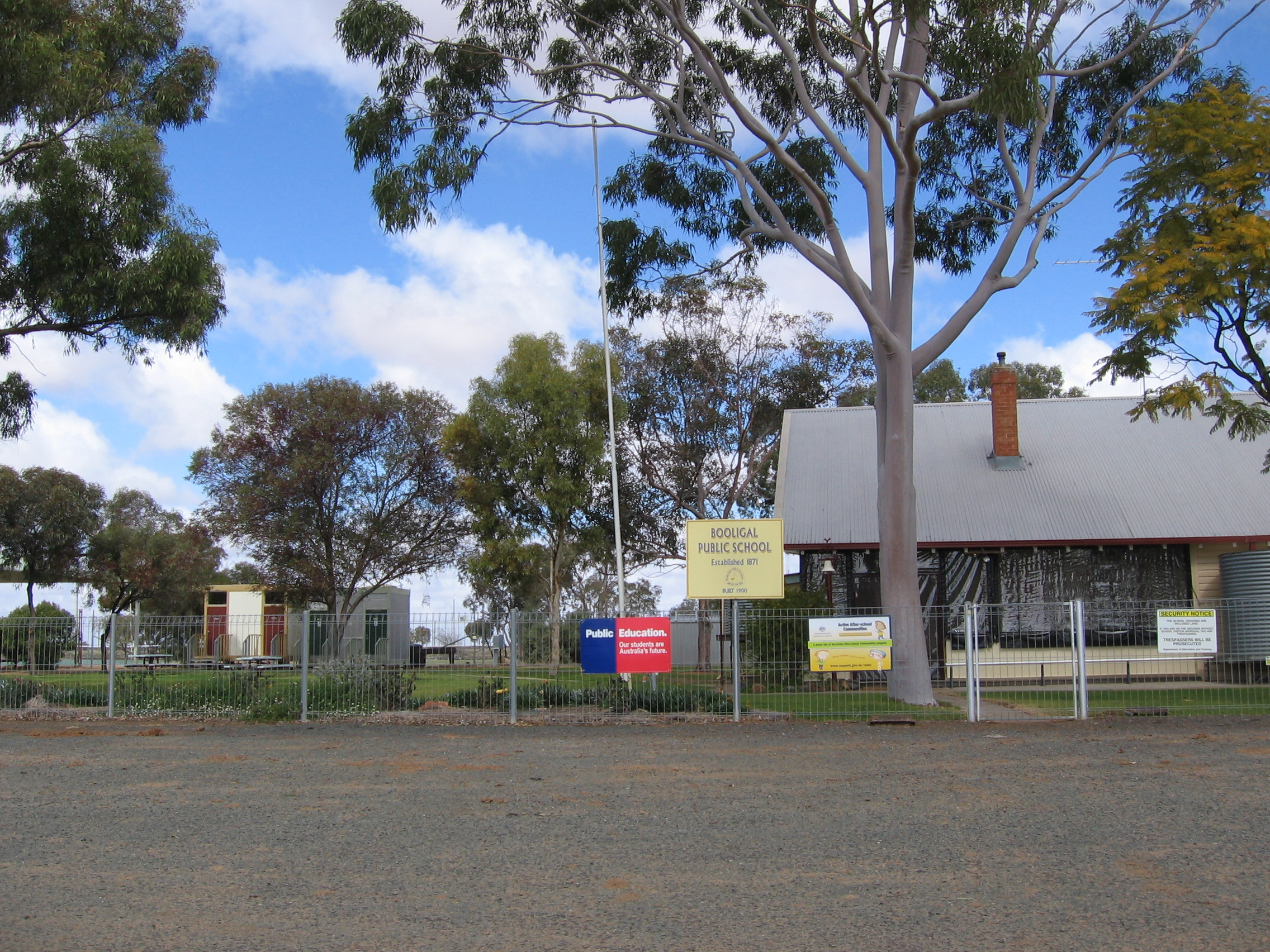
Public school

The village of Booligal has a general store and post office. There is a cricket oval for the occasional social game, shaded eating areas, playground and toilet facilities. The Booligal Hotel offers cold beverages, food and accommodation. A one-teacher primary school was recently re-opened in the village.

There are no sporting teams in Booligal itself, however, nearby Hay and Ivanhoe field rugby league teams in the Group 17 and Group 20 competitions respectively.

== Poetry and literature ==
A. B. "Banjo" Paterson (1864–1941) wrote a poem called Hay and Hell and Booligal about the district:

"Just now there is a howling drought
That pretty near has starved us out—
It never seems to rain at all;
But, if there should come any rain,
You couldn’t cross the black-soil plain—
You’d have to stop in Booligal."
...
"We’d have to stop!" With bated breath
We prayed that both in life and death
Our fate in other lines might fall:
"Oh, send us to our just reward
In Hay or Hell, but, gracious Lord,
Deliver us from Booligal!"

— A. B. "Banjo" Paterson, Hay and Hell and Booligal (concluding lines)
